= Emir Kir =

Belgian politician (born 1968)

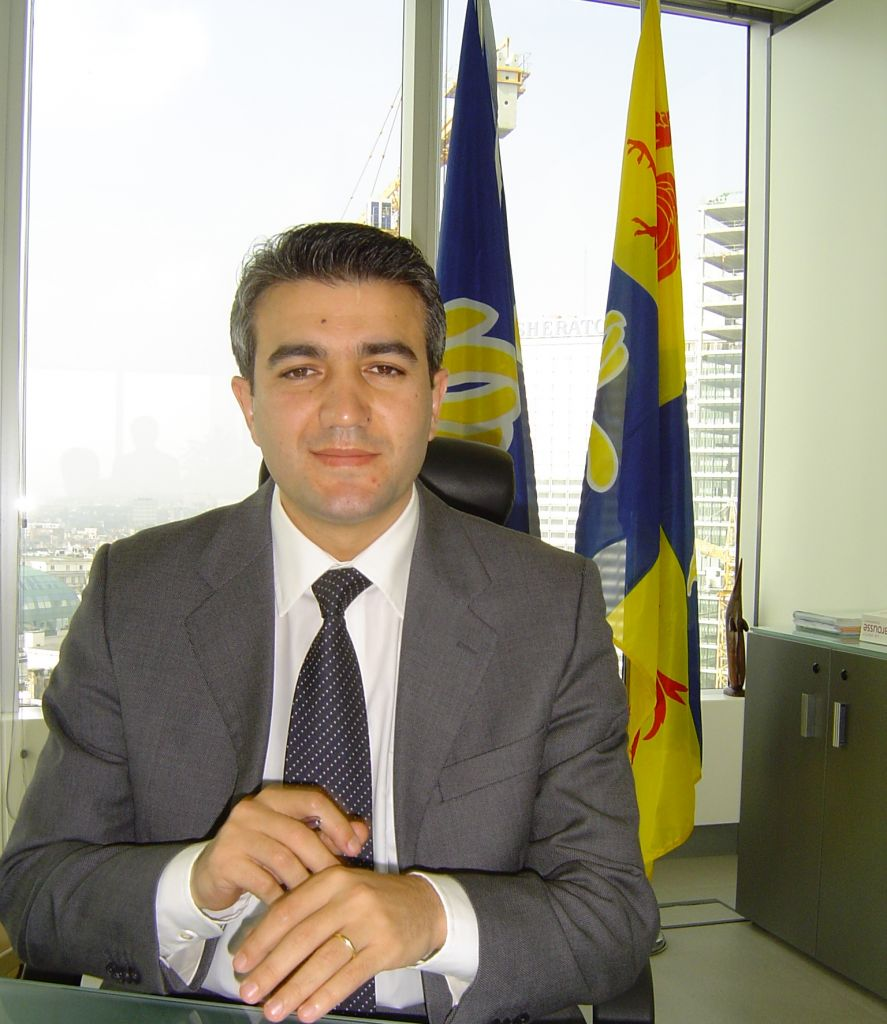
- Emir Kir in 2008

Mayor of Saint-Josse-ten-Noode
- Incumbent
- Assumed office 2012
- Preceded by: Jean Demannez

Personal details
- Born: 17 October 1968 (age 57) Charleroi, Belgium
- Party: Independent (since 2020)
- Other political affiliations: Socialist Party (1995–2020)
- Education: Université libre de Bruxelles

Emir Kir (born 17 October 1968) is a Belgian politician who has been mayor of Saint-Josse-ten-Noode since 2012, having been re-elected in 2018 and 2024. He was a member of the French-speaking Socialist Party (PS) until he was expelled from the party in January 2020 after contacts with the Turkish far-right.

== Early life ==
Kir was born on 17 October 1968 in Charleroi, Wallonia, the son of Muslim Turkish immigrants who came to work in the Belgian mines as guest workers in the 1960s. The family settled in Saint-Josse-ten-Noode in 1977, following a mining accident which condemned his father to disability.

Between 1987 and 1989, he studied political science at the Université libre de Bruxelles (ULB). He falsely claimed to be a "political science graduate" before a journalist revealed that he had lied since he had not submitted his final dissertation. He was only a candidate.

With a working-class background and admiration for Guy Cudell (mayor of Saint-Josse-ten-Noode for over forty years), he joined the French-speaking Socialist Party (PS) in 1995. Between 1995 and 2000, he worked as a social worker.

== Political ascent ==
In 2000, Kir presented himself as a candidate in the local elections in Saint-Josse-ten-Noode. Obtaining the second highest score in the municipality, he became alderman for Social Affairs and Public Education.

In 2004, following the regional elections, in which he achieved an unexpected score: 7,000 preferential votes (second PS score behind Charles Picqué), he left his post as alderman to become Secretary of State for Monuments and Sites and Public Cleanliness in the Brussels government, as well as Minister of Social Action, Family and Sport in the French Community Commission (COCOF).

In November 2005, Kir failed in a lawsuit against journalists for calling him "a denier, a liar and a delinquent". The court found it proven that Kir had taken part in a demonstration which had as its aim Armenian genocide denial.

In 2006, he took part in the local elections, winning more votes than the then-mayor Jean Demannez, but did not (yet) claim the maïorate, as he was still Secretary of State in the Brussels government, becoming instead first alderman. He also participated in the 2007 federal elections, was elected, but did not take office for the same reason. In 2009, he remained Secretary of State following the regional elections, but stepped down in the middle of the legislature. He also retained his seat as minister in the COCOF.

== Mayoralty ==
=== Election and first term (2012–2018) ===
In 2012, he ran in the local elections, again winning the greatest number of votes, higher than that of the head of the list Jean Demannez. He was elected and became mayor of Saint-Josse-ten-Noode at the end of 2012, after stormy negotiations. This made Kir the first mayor of Turkish origin in the French-speaking part of Belgium, as well as the first mayor of foreign origin in the Brussels region. His positions in the Brussels government were transferred to fellow party member Rachid Madrane.

In 2014, he was appointed by the Brussels government as chairman of the Brussels Regional Investment Company (GIMB).

In 2015, Kir was absent from a one-minute silence in the Chamber of Representatives for the centenary of the Armenian genocide. He was called upon by Socialist Party (PS) leader Elio Di Rupo and told to follow the party line and vote in favour of recognition of the genocide.

=== Second term (2018–2024) ===
He was elected to the Federal Parliament for the first time following the 2014 elections. He was re-elected as mayor of Saint-Josse-ten-Noode following the 2018 elections, with 3,904 preferential votes and, again, an absolute majority.

In April 2019, when interviewed by Al Arabiya of Saudi Arabia, Kir compared Belgium to Nazi Germany for the Plan Canal, a large revitalization program which also included an initiative against Islamic extremism in Brussels. The following month, he distributed campaign leaflets saying that the plan was an attack on Muslims, for which he was accused by other parties of sectarianism and clientelism.

Kir was expelled from the party in 2020 following a controversial meeting with a delegation of Turkish mayors which also included representatives from the far-right MHP party.

In April 2024, Kir issued a ban on the right-wing National Conservatism Conference to be held in Saint-Josse-ten-Noode, citing "ensuring of public security" and saying that the "extreme-right is not welcome" in Brussels. Kir's decision was criticized by the Prime Minister of the United Kingdom, Rishi Sunak, and the Prime Minister of Belgium, Alexander De Croo. The ban was legally challenged by the organizers and the Council of State subsequently allowed the conference to continue, in compliance with freedom of speech guaranteed in Article 26 of the Belgian Constitution.

=== Third term (2025–) ===
In 2025, he was sworn in again as mayor following a successful 2024 re-election.

== Honours ==
- Commander of the Order of Leopold II
