= History of Brussels =

From pre-history to 1714

The history of Brussels, the capital city of Belgium and the European Union, stretches back over a millennium. In that time, it has developed into one of Europe's most important political and cultural centres. The city has endured foreign occupation, religious conflict, bombardment, revolution, and waves of urban transformation.

== Early history ==
=== Prehistory ===
The first known inhabitants lived on the edges of what is now the Brussels-Capital Region, avoiding the marshy valley of the Senne. Polished silex from the Mesolithic have been found in the Nekkersgat. During the late Neolithic, settlements from the Michelsberg culture were established in the Sonian Forest. Farmers settled on cleared land during the Bronze and Iron Ages, and from the 5th to the 1st century BCE, the La Tène culture maintained a settlement on the Champ Saint-Anne/Sint-Annaveld in Anderlecht. Around 1000–800 BCE, Celtic tribes settled in the region.

In the Roman period, villas were established on both banks of the Senne in the 1st and 2nd centuries CE, including sites in Stalle, Laeken, Jette, and Anderlecht, the latter built on the site of the former Neolithic settlement on the Champ Saint-Anne. Burial mounds from this era or earlier have also been identified.

=== Middle Ages ===
By the 4th–6th centuries CE, Frankish tribes occupied the territories between the Meuse and Scheldt rivers. Evidence of their presence in the Brussels area includes a Frankish tomb on the Zeecrabbeweg and a Merovingian cemetery with over three hundred graves on the Champ Saint-Anne, dating to 500–700 CE. By this period, small agricultural hamlets had arisen on the hills near the Senne.

The earliest history of Brussels remains somewhat unclear. In 580, Saint Gaugericus built a chapel on an island in the Senne, laying the origin of the settlement which is to become Brussels. By 843, the region became part of Lotharingia following the signing of the Treaty of Verdun. In 870, the first mention of the County of Brussels was made in the Treaty of Meerssen. By 959, the city became part of Lower Lotharingia. Between 977 and 979, a castrum was constructed on Saint Gaugericus Island, and in 979, Charles, Duke of Lower Lorraine, transferred the relics of Saint Gudula to the chapel built by Saint Gaugericus, marking the city's official founding.

Current research suggests that Brussels developed gradually from an agricultural community that expanded rapidly from the 8th century. The traditional narrative that the city arose around a castrum established by Charles, Duke of Lower Lorraine, remains based on later and less reliable sources.

The first reliable mention of Brussels dates from around 1015–1020, describing the settlement as a portus, a loading and unloading site on the Senne, likely associated with nearby dwellings whose locations remain uncertain. Soon after, a princely authority, the Counts of Leuven, appears to have established a presence, drawn by the vitality of the port and surrounding countryside. Medieval documents indicate that local farmers were required to transport grain to Brussels for shipment, reflecting its early role in regional trade. A north–south route connected Brussels to the fertile grain-producing regions of southern Brabant and Hainaut, integrating the settlement into broader east–west trade flows between Flanders and the Rhineland. Within the city, this route later became known as the Steenweg, including streets such as the Rue de Namur/Naamsestraat, Rue du Marché aux Herbes/Grasmarkt, and Rue du Marché aux Poulets/Kiekenmarkt, while routes outside the city included the Chaussée d'Ixelles/Elsensesteenweg and Chaussée de Gand/Gentsesteenweg.

By the 11th–12th centuries, Brussels consisted of a loose network of residential centres, a pattern described as the ‘polynuclear’ character of medieval towns. Key early cores included the portus, possibly linked to St. Gaugericus Church, the Coudenberg lordship, and the area around Saint Michael’s Church, where a chapter of secular canons was founded in the mid-11th century. Archaeological evidence also points to other small settlements, such as near the present Place de la Vieille Halle aux Blés/Oud Korenhuis, and planned districts like the early 12th-century textile neighbourhood around the Chapel Church, today’s Marollen district. Additional development occurred near St. Nicholas Church and St. Catherine Chapel along the Steenweg. From the outset, the city displayed a dichotomy still visible today: trade and municipal authority in the valley, and princely residences on the surrounding hills. The growth of Brussels resulted from the interaction and competition among these various settlements, transforming a group of villages into a coherent urban agglomeration.

Between 1209 and 1406, Brussels evolved into a major political, economic, and cultural centre. The early 13th century saw the establishment of key religious and civic institutions: the Grand Royal and Noble Oath of the Crossbowmen of Our Lady of Sablon, and the planting of the Meyboom. The city gained financial independence through a revenue account and received a charter of rights the same year. Religious life flourished with the Recollects convent, the Great Beguinage, the Beguinage of Anderlecht, La Cambre Abbey, the Convent of Boetendael, and the Priory of Val Duchesse.

Under Duke John the Victorious, Brussels became the capital of the Duchy of Brabant, and civic administration expanded with the Drapery Court, Wise Council, and recognition of the cloth guild. Restrictions on artisans and taxation, including duties on cranes and beer, were established, and Molenbeek joined the Coop of Brussels. The 14th century was marked by growth, conflict, and social change: Schaerbeek, Etterbeek, Laeken, Anderlecht, Obbrussel, and Forest joined the Coop, while the Brussels Revolt and subsequent suppression of craftsmen shaped governance. The Seven Noble Houses were attested, and guilds such as Saint Luke, Four Crowned, and Brewers' Guild gained recognition.

Religious and civic life continued with the Church of Our Lady of Victories of the Sablon, Rouge Cloître Abbey, the Ommegang, and John of Ruusbroec becoming parish priest at St. Michael and St. Gudula. The city endured crises including the Great Famine, and Black Death. Revolts and conflicts included the crafts uprising, the Battle of Scheut, and the Sacrament of Miracle. Everard t’Serclaes liberated the city in 1356, later suffering mutilation and death in 1388, prompting a military expedition to Gaasbeek Castle. Civic governance advanced as Geert Pipenpoy became the city’s first mayor in 1380, the Halle Gate was built, the Town Hall construction began, and the Court of Auditors was established. Population reached around 20,000 by 1400, despite destructive fires in 1405–1406.

== Modern history ==
=== Burgundian Brussels (1406–1482) ===
During the 15th century, Brussels became a significant centre under Burgundian rule, marked by political change, civic development, and cultural flourishing. In 1406, Anthony the Great Bastard made his Joyous Entry into the city, and by 1407 a fire brigade was organised, though water supply remained limited. The early 15th century saw social and religious movements such as the prosecution of the Homines Intelligentiae and the settlement of the Brethren of the Common Life. Political tensions between Duke John IV and the States of Brabant led to the guilds’ participation in city governance alongside the Seven Noble Houses in 1421, as part of early democratic reforms.

Brussels became part of the Burgundian State in 1430 under Duke Philip the Good. Cultural and architectural developments included Rogier van der Weyden’s appointment as city artist, the construction and completion of the Town Hall, the Chapel of the Blessed Sacrament of the Miracle, the Charterhouse of Scheut, and the foundation of Chapel of Boondael. Civic life continued to evolve with the establishment of printing presses, chambers of rhetoric such as De Corenbloem, and the Royal Oath of St. Michael and St. Gudula or the Fencers of Brussels. Political turbulence continued under Charles the Bold and the Habsburgs, including Joyous Entries, relocation of the Chamber of Accounts to Mechelen, and the granting of the Great Privilege by Duchess Mary of Burgundy, restoring key liberties to the city and the States General.

=== Habsburg Brussels (1482–1556) ===
From the late 15th to the mid-16th century, Brussels continued to develop politically, culturally, and economically under Habsburg influence. Key civic and cultural institutions flourished: the De Lelie and De Violette chambers of rhetoric, and the Brotherhood of Our Lady of the Seven Sorrows. The city was embroiled in the Flemish Revolt, including the Peace of Bruges, the siege of Beersel Castle, and the Peace of Danebroek, reflecting the city’s turbulent political climate.

Under Emperor Charles V, Brussels became the official capital of the Netherlands, hosting the permanent court and major events such as the Joyous Entry of Charles V and Philip the Prudent. The period saw significant cultural and religious developments: the establishment of postal services, the Miracle of 1511, the publication of De Moluccis Insulis, and the rise of Lutheran, Munsterite, and Mennonite communities. Civic improvements included the construction of the King's House, the Granvelle Palace, and the Willebroek Canal, alongside municipal codification of liberties and social welfare reforms such as the Supreme Charity. Notable figures included Erasmus, Andreas Vesalius, and Margaretha von Waldeck, while events like executions for heresy underscored the era’s religious tensions.

=== Spanish Brussels (1556–1714) ===
Between 1556 and 1711, Brussels was a focal point of religious, political, and cultural change under Spanish rule. The city was deeply affected by the Dutch Revolt, including the Petition of the Nobles, iconoclastic attacks, and the arrival of the Duke of Alba, which led to the executions of prominent figures such as the Counts of Egmont and Horn. Periods of Calvinist governance, such as the Calvinist Republic of Brussels, alternated with Spanish military control, including the siege by the Army of Flanders. Civic improvements continued with the Willebroek Canal, the Amigo Prison, and the Simpelhuys, alongside notable religious and judicial events like witch trials and heresy executions, including Josyne van Beethoven.

Brussels also became a centre of social and cultural activity, with the establishment of colleges, convents, charitable institutions, and guilds. Iconic developments included the recasting of Manneken Pis in bronze, construction of theatres and fortifications, and the creation of brotherhoods and civic charities throughout the 17th century. The city faced plagues (1575, 1634), fires, and military attacks, most devastatingly the French bombardment of 1695, but it rebuilt its Grand-Place and continued to flourish, culminating in the opening of the Theatre of La Monnaie and the Royal Academy of Fine Arts.

=== 18th century ===
In the 18th century, Brussels experienced both cultural development and political turbulence. In April 1717, Peter the Great visited the city, and later that year the Theatre of La Monnaie was sold to Jean-Baptiste Meeûs. In September 1719, François Anneessens was executed on the Grand-Place, and in March 1724 the Senne flooded, leaving the lower town under water. The Palace of Coudenberg was destroyed by fire in February 1731, and in 1733 new burial regulations were introduced to limit the spread of disease. Prince Charles Alexander of Lorraine entered Brussels in 1744, the year before English troops stole the Manneken Pis statue, later returned by the residents of Geraardsbergen.

The city was besieged and captured by French forces in early 1746 during the War of the Austrian Succession, though it was returned to Austria under the Treaty of Aix-la-Chapelle in 1749. In the second half of the century, urban development accelerated: Brussels Park, the Rue Royale/Koningsstraat, the Place des Martyrs/Martelaarsplein, and the Place Royale/Koningsplein were laid out, while the Palace of the Council of Brabant (today’s Palace of the Nation), the Royal Palace, and the Palace of Laeken (then Schonenberg) were constructed. Several cultural institutions also emerged, including the Imperial and Royal Academy, the Theresian College, and the Royal Park Theatre.

Social and political unrest grew towards the century’s end. Emperor Joseph II’s reforms, including the dismantling of the city’s fortifications and the abolition of provincial privileges, provoked resistance. Street clashes with Austrian troops in 1787–88 helped trigger the Brabant Revolution, during which Brussels briefly became the capital of the United Belgian States. The Austrians soon regained control, but the city was again occupied by French troops in 1792, lost, and retaken in 1794 following the Battle of Fleurus. In 1795, Brussels was formally annexed by France and became the capital of the department of the Dyle. Under French administration, guilds and abbeys were suppressed, churches demolished, and street names secularised, while new institutions such as the civil registry and the École centrale du département de la Dyle were established. By 1800, Brussels counted over 66,000 inhabitants and had founded its first professional Fire Brigade.
