= Jean Demannez =

Belgian politician (1949–2021)

Mayor of Saint-Josse-ten-Noode
- In office 16 May 1999 – 3 December 2012
- Preceded by: Guy Cudell
- Succeeded by: Emir Kir

Personal details
- Born: 15 February 1949
- Died: 1 December 2021 (aged 72)
- Party: PS

Jean Demannez (15 February 1949 – 1 December 2021) was a Belgian politician. He served as mayor of Saint-Josse-ten-Noode in the Brussels-Capital Region from 1999 to 2012.

== Biography ==
A member of the Socialist Party (PS), Demannez was elected schepen of the communal council of Saint-Josse-ten-Noode in January 1977. Following the death of Guy Cudell, he became mayor. He also served in the Parliament of the Brussels-Capital Region from 1989 to 2001 and was President of the Compagnie intercommunale bruxelloise des eaux.

In 2012, Demannez was defeated in the local election by Emir Kir and lost his seat as mayor of Saint-Josse-ten-Noode.

== Jazz ==
Demannez was passionate about jazz. As mayor, he founded the Saint-Jazz-ten-Noode festival and led the initiative for the foundation of Jazz Station, located in the old Chaussée de Louvain railway station.
