= Midi Fair =

Fair in Brussels, Belgium

Midi Fair: Foire du Midi (French); Zuidfoor (Dutch)
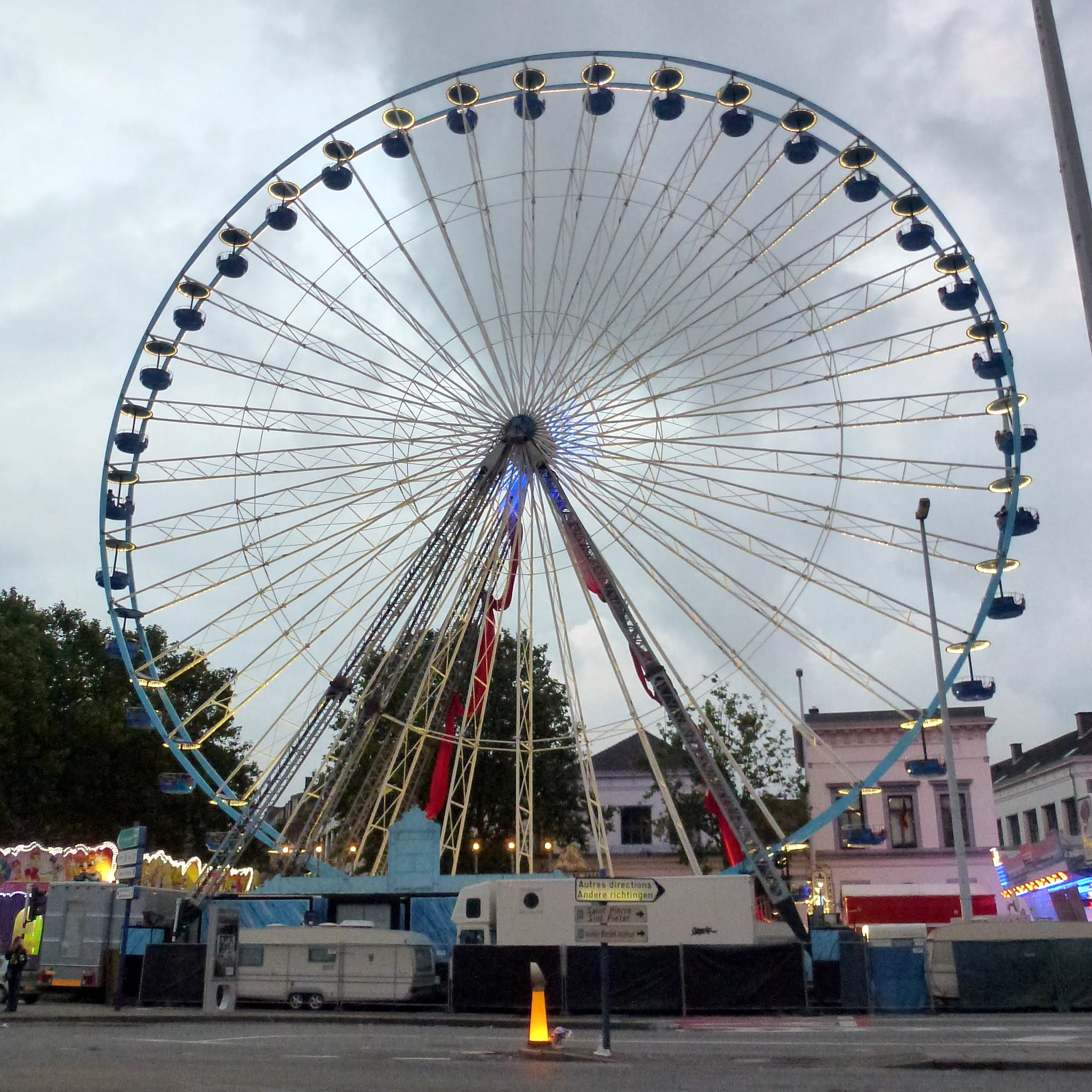
- Nickname: Kermesse of Brussels
- Status: Active
- Frequency: Annual
- Locations: City of Brussels, Brussels-Capital Region
- Country: Belgium
- Inaugurated: 1880
- Attendance: 1.5 million
- Website: www.foiredumidi.brussels

The Midi Fair, also known as the South Fair (French: Foire du Midi; Dutch: Zuidfoor) or the Kermesse of Brussels (French: Kermesse de Bruxelles; Dutch: Kermis van Brussel), is the most important fair or kermesse in Brussels, Belgium, held since 1880. It takes place every year and lasts more than a month, starting on the Saturday preceding 21 July (Belgian National Day) and ending on the Sunday of the sixth fair weekend, in the second half of August. The average of over 120 attractions draw more than 1.5 million visitors annually.

== History ==
The Midi Fair has been organised since 1880 on the Boulevard du Midi/Zuidlaan, part of the Small Ring (Brussels' inner ring road), between the Halle Gate and the Anderlecht Gate. That year, the Brussels City Council decided to bring together the fairs of the Grand-Place/Grote Markt (Brussels' main square), the Marché aux Grains/Graanmarkt and the Place des Martyrs/Martelaarsplein at this new location, on the occasion of the 50th anniversary of Belgian independence. Subsequently, a committee of traders and municipal councilors was set up in 1882 to organise the Brussels Fair. After some hesitation, the fair was renewed every year from 1885.

Since its 19th-century origins, the Midi Fair—now the largest fair in Brussels, extending over 1 km (0.62 mi) along the Small Ring—has evolved a lot and adapted to technological developments. Wrestlers' booths, fortune-tellers, steam-powered carousels and barrel organs have given way to purely technical attractions such as bumper cars, roller coasters, Ferris wheels, etc. Snacks sold at food stalls include caricoles (periwinkles), crabs, French fries and smoutebollen (beignets).

The event was cancelled in 2020 due to the COVID-19 pandemic in Belgium. In 2021, the event's location was moved slightly up from its regular spot due to work being carried out on the future metro line 3 on the Avenue de Stalingrad/Stalingradlaan, leading to noise complaints by nearby residents. That same year, the fair was included in the inventory of intangible cultural heritage of the Brussels-Capital Region under the listing: 'The living culture of the funfair'. By 2022, however, the number of visitors had not yet returned to pre-pandemic figures.

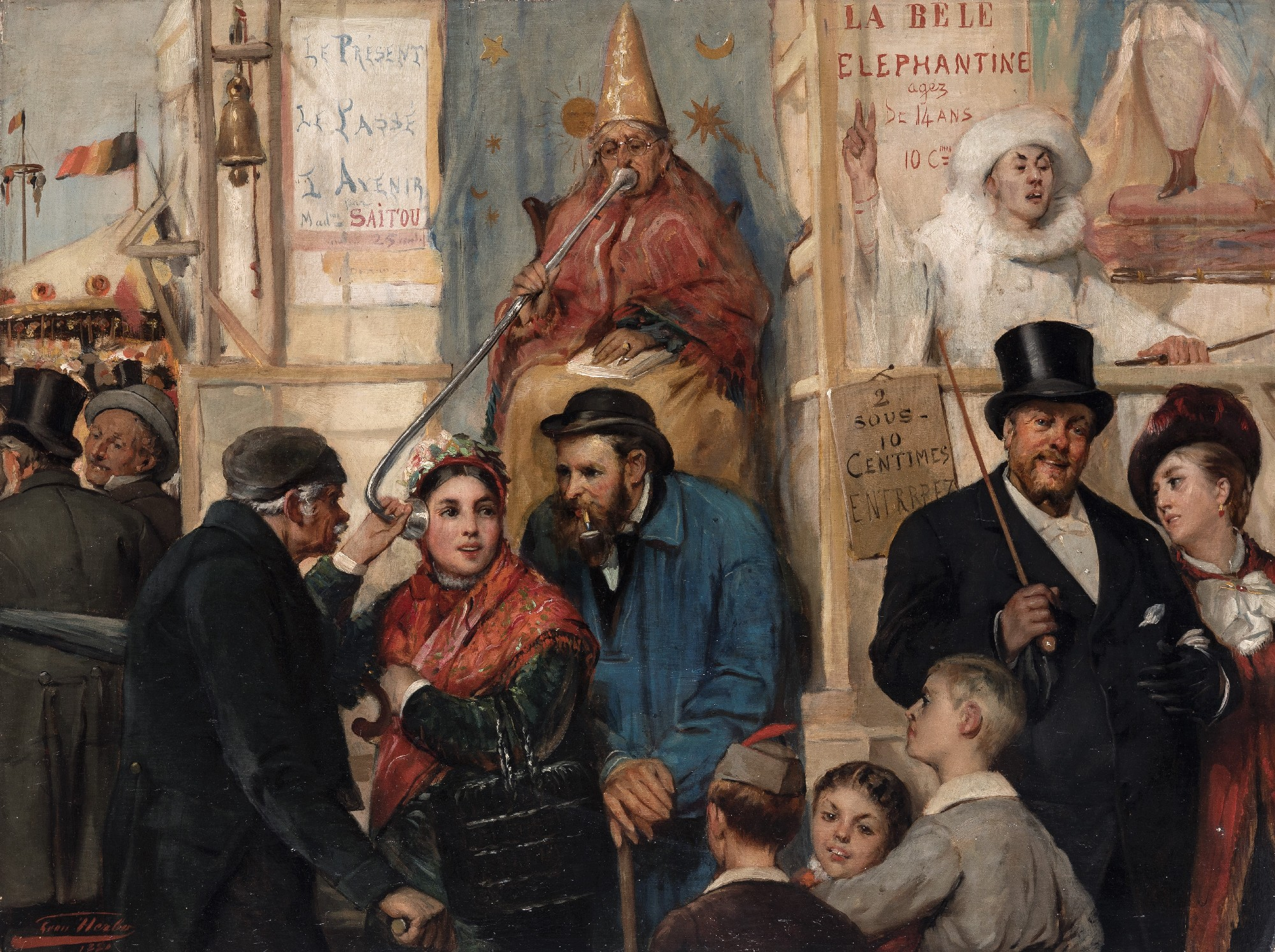
The kermesse of Brussels of 1880, Léon Herbo, 1880

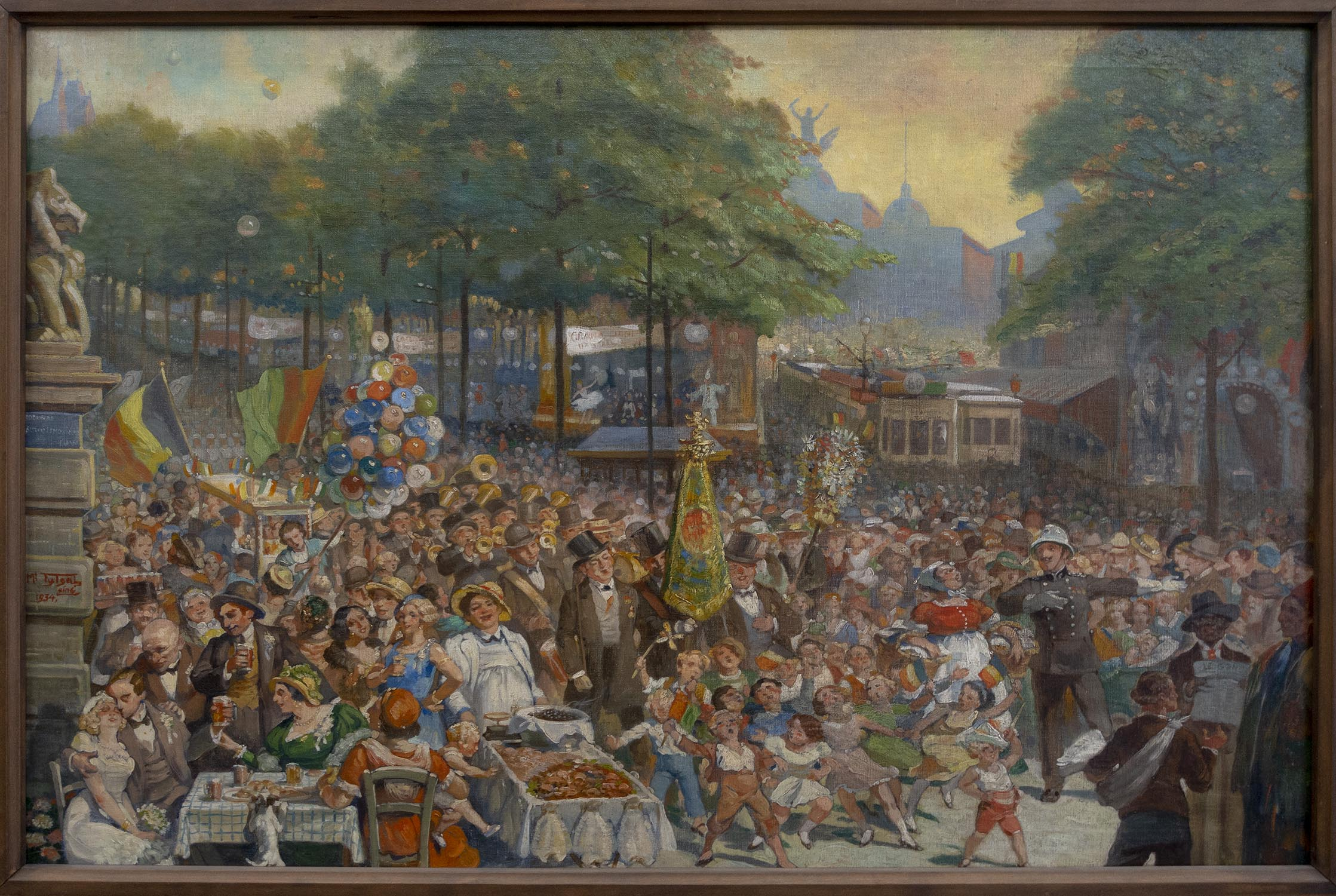
Midi Fair in Brussels, Médard Tytgat, 1934

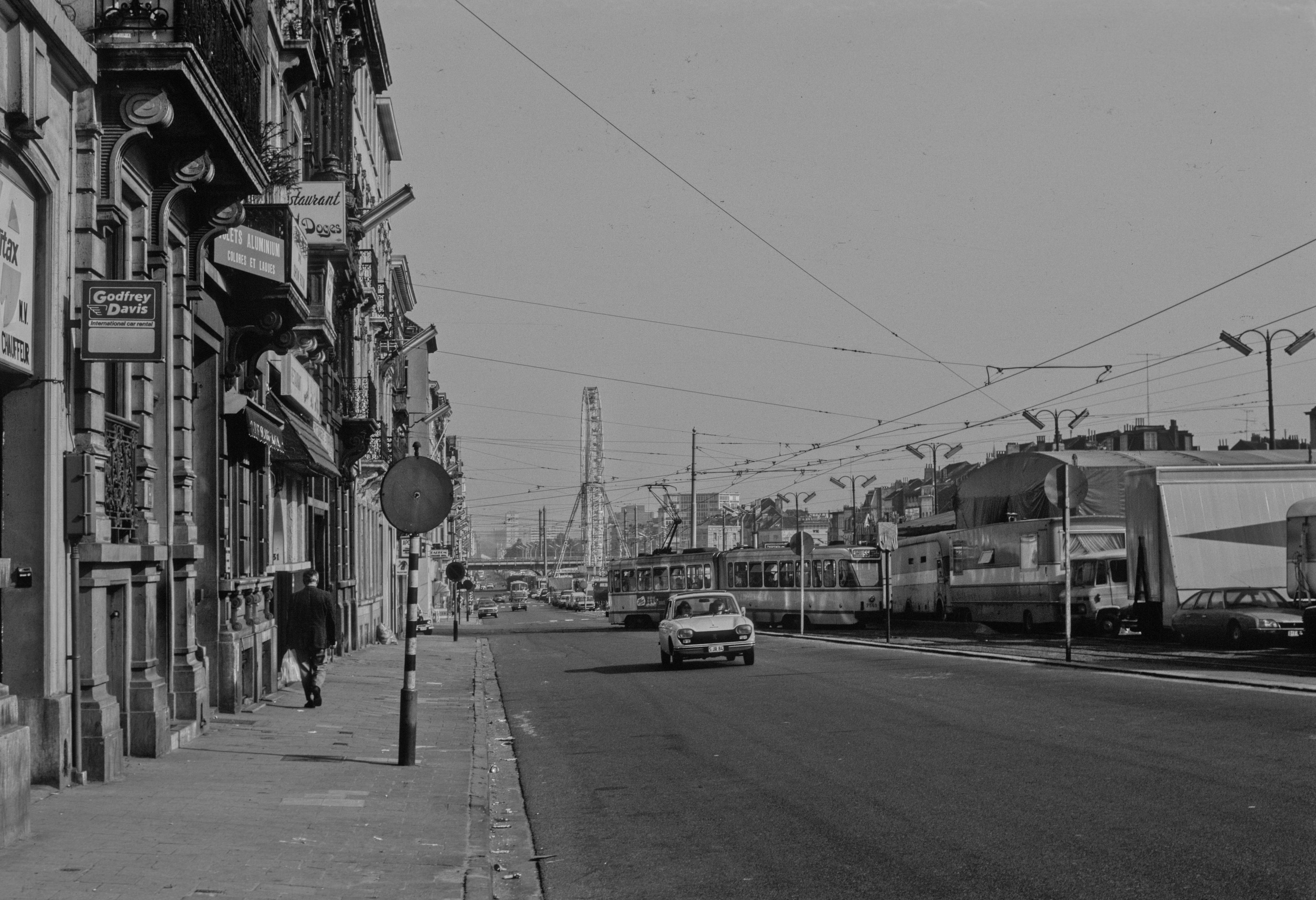
View of the fair from the Boulevard du Midi/Zuidlaan, 1980

== See also ==
- History of Brussels
- Culture of Belgium
- Belgium in the long nineteenth century
