= Culture of Brussels =

Brussels is a cultural hub in Belgium and Europe, and is home to a wide range of cultural institutions, including museums, theatres, music venues, and cultural centres.

== Visual arts and museums ==
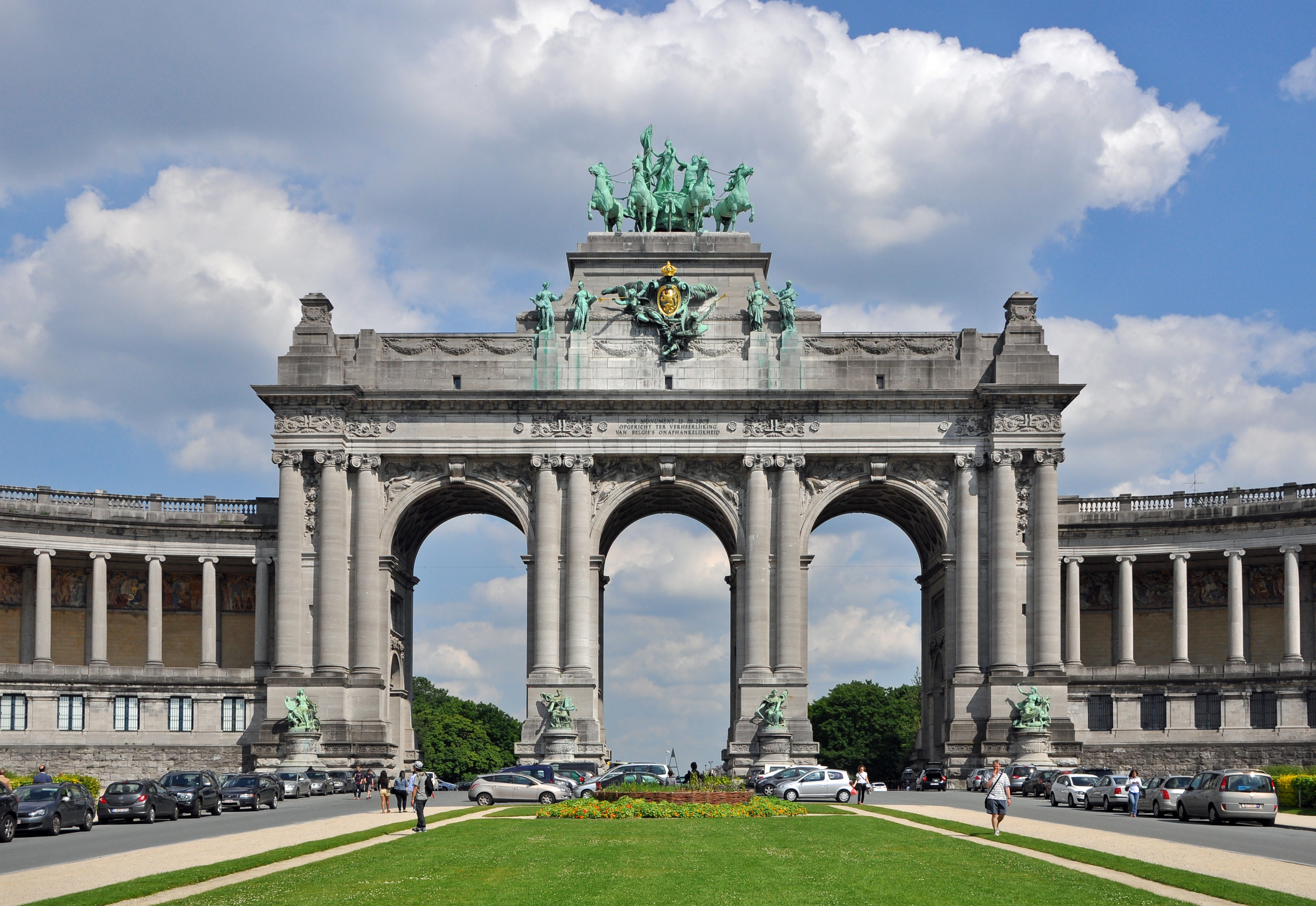
Cinquantenaire/Jubelpark memorial arcade and museums

Brussels contains over 80 museums. The Royal Museums of Fine Arts has an extensive collection of various painters, such as Flemish old masters like Bruegel, Rogier van der Weyden, Robert Campin, Anthony van Dyck, Jacob Jordaens, and Peter Paul Rubens. The Magritte Museum houses the world's largest collection of works by the surrealist artist René Magritte. Museums dedicated to the national history of Belgium include the BELvue Museum, the Royal Museums of Art and History, and the Royal Museum of the Armed Forces and Military History. The Musical Instruments Museum (MIM), housed in the Old England building, is part of the Royal Museums of Art and History, and is internationally renowned for its collection of over 8,000 instruments.

Brussels has had a distinguished art scene for many years. The Belgian surrealists René Magritte and Paul Delvaux, for instance, studied and lived there, as did the avant-garde dramatist Michel de Ghelderode. The city was also home of the impressionist painter Anna Boch from the artists' group Les XX, and includes other Belgian painters such as Léon Spilliaert. Brussels is also a capital of the comic strip; some treasured Belgian characters are Tintin, Lucky Luke, The Smurfs, Spirou, Gaston, Marsupilami, Blake and Mortimer, Boule et Bill and Cubitus (see Belgian comics). Throughout the city, walls are painted with large motifs of comic book characters; these murals taken together are known as Brussels' Comic Book Route. Also, the interiors of some Metro stations are designed by artists. The Belgian Comic Strip Center combines two artistic leitmotifs of Brussels, being a museum devoted to Belgian comic strips, housed in the former Magasins Waucquez textile department store, designed by Victor Horta in the Art Nouveau style. In addition, street art is changing the landscape of this multicultural city.

== Performing arts venues and festivals ==
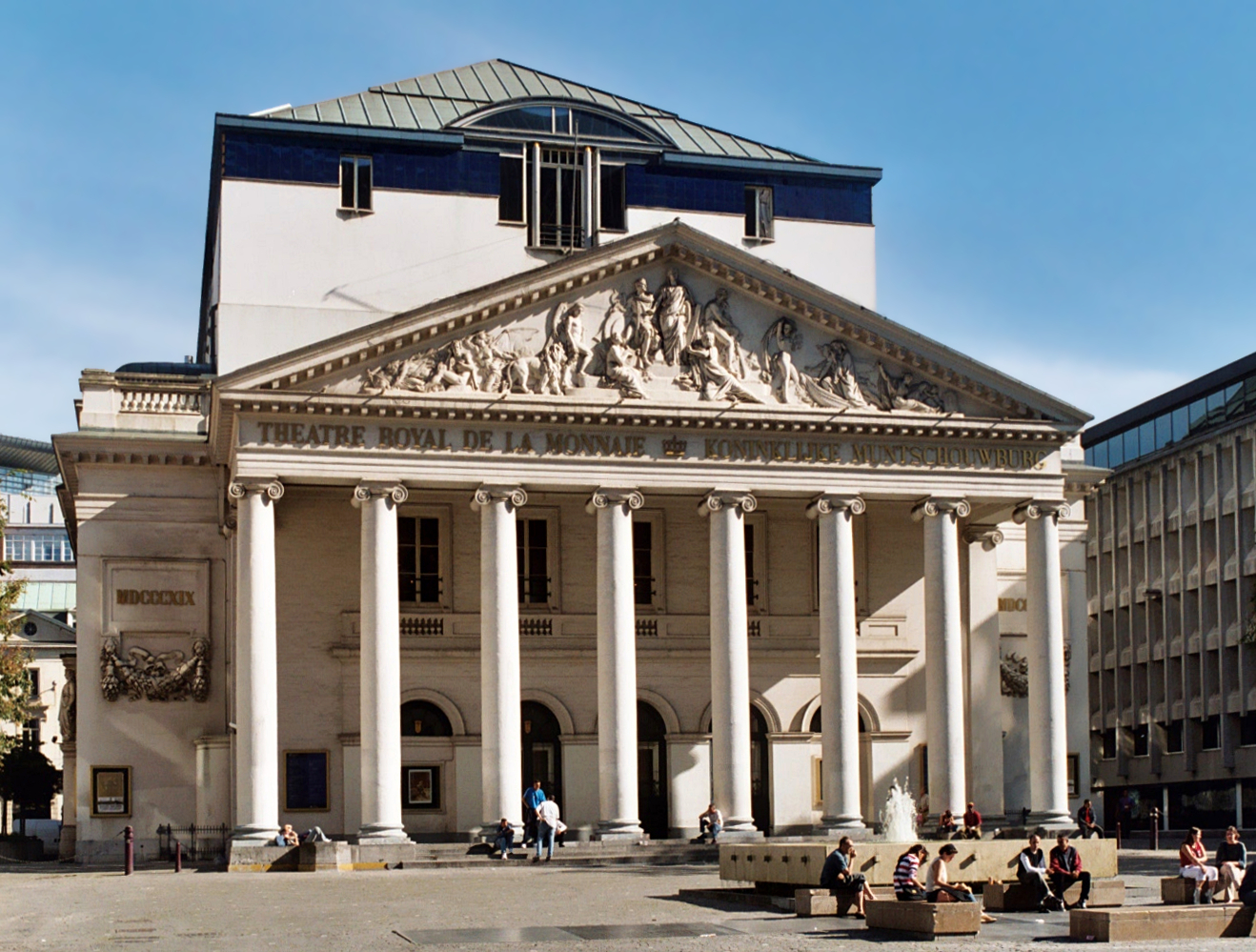
Royal Theatre of La Monnaie

Brussels is well known for its performing arts scene, with the Royal Theatre of La Monnaie, the Royal Park Theatre, the Théâtre Royal des Galeries, and the Kaaitheater among the most notable institutions.

The King Baudouin Stadium is a concert and competition facility with a 50,000 seat capacity, the largest in Belgium. The site was formerly occupied by the Heysel Stadium. The Centre for Fine Arts (often referred to as BOZAR in French or PSK in Dutch), a multi-purpose centre for theatre, cinema, music, literature, and art exhibitions, is home to the National Orchestra of Belgium and to the annual Queen Elisabeth Competition for classical singers and instrumentalists, one of the most challenging and prestigious competitions of the kind. Studio 4 in Le Flagey cultural centre hosts the Brussels Philharmonic.

Other concert venues include Forest National/Vorst Nationaal, the Ancienne Belgique, the Cirque Royal/Koninklijk Circus, the Botanique and Palais 12/Paleis 12. Furthermore, the Jazz Station in Saint-Josse-ten-Noode is a museum and archive on jazz, and a venue for jazz concerts.

The Kunstenfestivaldesarts, an international performing arts festival, is organised every year in May. Its main hub is the Kaaitheater, with performances and artworks also hosted in around 30 venues throughout the city.

== Other cultural events and festivals ==
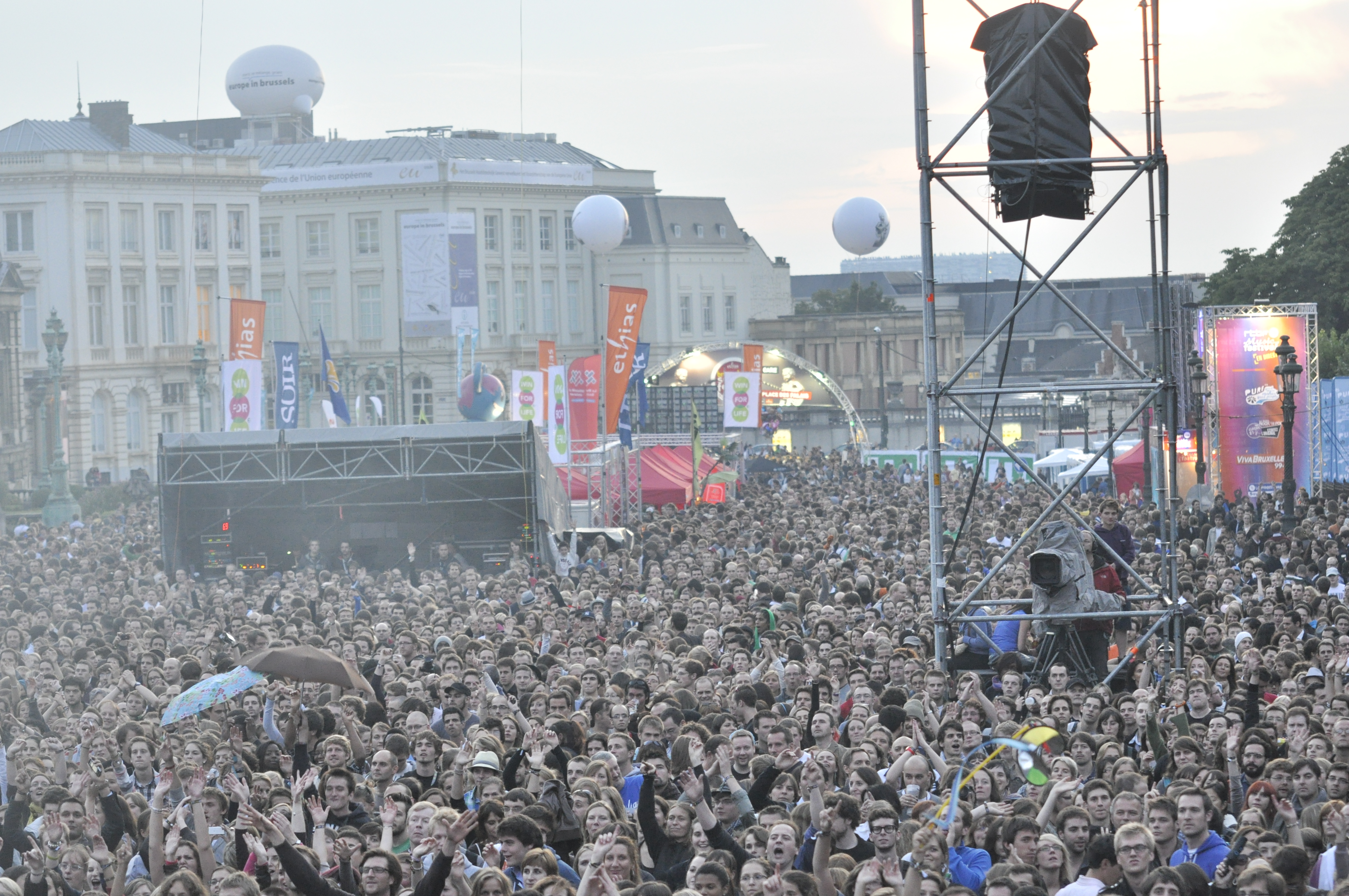
Brussels Summer Festival (BSF)

Many events are organised or hosted in Brussels throughout the year. In addition, many festivals animate the Brussels scene.

The Iris Festival is the official festival of the Brussels-Capital Region and is held annually in spring. The International Fantastic Film Festival of Brussels (BIFFF) is organised during the Easter holidays and the Magritte Awards in February. The Festival of Europe, an open day and activities in and around the European Union's institutions, is held on 9 May. On Belgian National Day, on 21 July, a military parade and celebrations take place on the Place des Palais/Paleizenplein and in Brussels Park, ending with a fireworks display in the evening.

Some summer festivities include Couleur Café Festival, a festival of world and urban music, around the end of June or early July, the Brussels Summer Festival (BSF), a music festival in August, the Midi Fair, the most important yearly fair in Brussels, lasting more than a month, in July and August, and Brussels Beach, when the banks of the canal are turned into a temporary urban beach. Other biennial events are the Zinneke Parade, a colourful, multicultural parade through the city, which has been held since 2000 in May, as well as the popular Flower Carpet at the Grand-Place in August. Heritage Days are organised on the third weekend of September (sometimes coinciding with the car-free day). The "Winter Wonders" animate the heart of Brussels in December; these winter activities were launched in 2001.

== Folklore ==
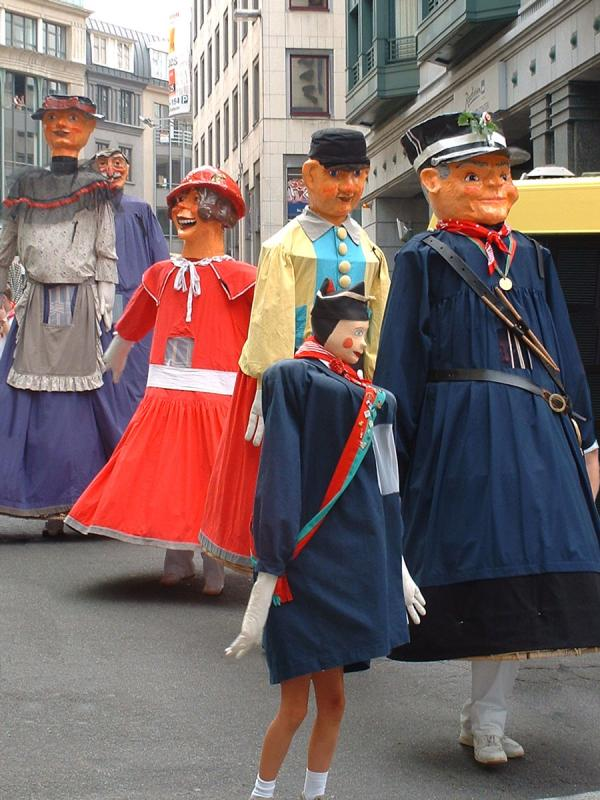
Meyboom giants in Brussels, a UNESCO Intangible Cultural Heritage

Brussels' identity owes much to its rich folklore and traditions, among the liveliest in the country.

The Ommegang, a medieval pageant and folkloric costumed procession, commemorating the Joyous Entry of Emperor Charles V and his son, Philip II, in the city in 1549, takes place every year in July. The colourful parade includes floats, traditional processional giants, such as Saint Michael and Saint Gudula, and scores of folkloric groups, either on foot or on horseback, dressed in medieval garb. The parade concludes with a large spectacle at the Grand-Place. Since 2019, it has been recognised as a Masterpiece of the Oral and Intangible Heritage of Humanity by UNESCO.

The Meyboom, an even-older folk tradition of Brussels (1308), celebrating the "May tree"—in fact, a corruption of the Dutch word, meaning tree of joy—takes place paradoxically on 9 August. After parading a young beech in the city, it is planted in a joyful spirit with lots of music, Brusseleir songs, and processional giants. It has also been recognised as an expression of intangible cultural heritage by UNESCO, as part of the bi-national inscription "Processional giants and dragons in Belgium and France". The celebration is reminiscent of the town's long-standing (folkloric) feud with Leuven, which dates back to the Middle Ages.

Saint Verhaegen (often shortened to St V), a folkloric student procession, celebrating the anniversary of the founding of the Université libre de Bruxelles (ULB) and the Vrije Universiteit Brussel (VUB), is held on 20 November. Since 2019, it has also been listed as intangible cultural heritage of the Brussels-Capital Region.

Another introduction to the Brusseleir local dialect and way of life can be obtained at the Royal Theatre Toone, a folkloric theatre of marionettes, located a stone's throw away from the Grand-Place. Finally, two famous folkloric plays, Le Mariage de Mademoiselle Beulemans by Frantz Fonson and Fernand Wicheler, and Bossemans et Coppenolle by Joris d'Hanswyck and Paul Van Stalle, are still the subject of regular revivals.

== Food ==
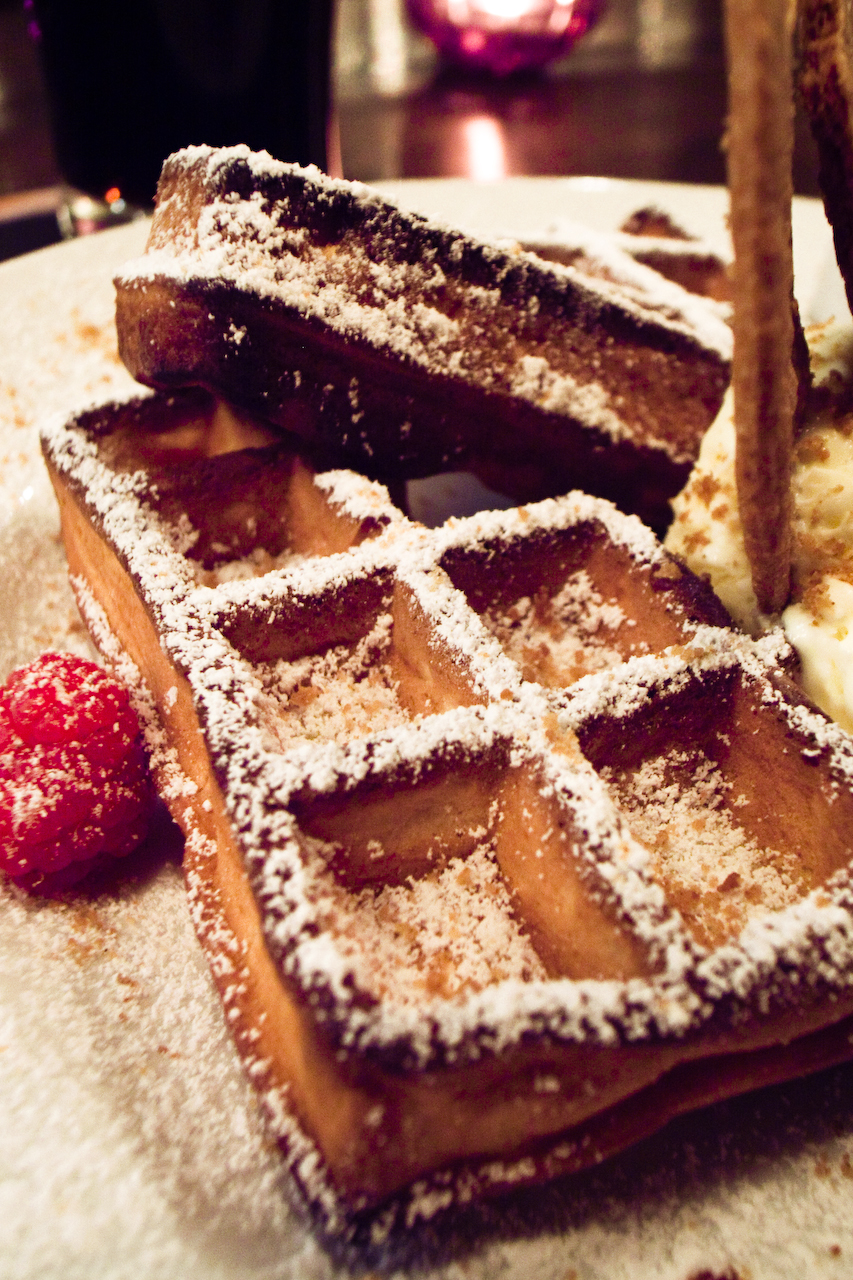
Brussels is known for its local waffles.

Brussels is well known for its local waffle, its chocolate, French fries and numerous types of beers. The Brussels sprout, which has long been popular in Brussels, and may have originated there, is also named after the city.

Owing to Brussels' cosmopolitan population, almost every national cuisine in the world can be found there. The gastronomic offer includes approximately 1,800 restaurants (including three 2-starred and ten 1-starred Michelin restaurants), and a number of bars. Alongside the traditional restaurants, there are many cafés, bistros and the usual range of international fast food chains. The cafés are similar to bars, and offer beer and light dishes; coffee houses are called salons de thé (literally "tea salons"). Also widespread are brasseries, which usually offer a variety of beers and typical national dishes.

Belgian cuisine is known among connoisseurs as one of the best in Europe. It is characterised by the combination of French cuisine with the more hearty Flemish fare. Notable specialities include Brussels waffles (gaufres) and mussels (usually as moules-frites, served with fries). The city is a stronghold of chocolate and praline manufacturers with renowned companies like Côte d'Or, Neuhaus, Leonidas and Godiva. Pralines were first introduced in 1912 by Jean Neuhaus II, a Belgian chocolatier of Swiss origin, in the Royal Saint-Hubert Galleries. Numerous friteries are spread throughout the city, and in tourist areas, fresh hot waffles are also sold on the street.

As well as other Belgian beers, the spontaneously fermented lambic style, brewed in and around Brussels, is widely available there and in the nearby Senne valley where the wild yeasts that ferment it have their origin. Kriek, a cherry lambic, is available in almost every bar or restaurant in Brussels.

Brussels is known as the birthplace of the Belgian endive. The technique for growing blanched endives was accidentally discovered in the 1850s at the Botanical Garden of Brussels in Saint-Josse-ten-Noode.

== Sources ==
- State, Paul F. (2004). "Brusselization". Historical dictionary of Brussels. Historical dictionaries of cities of the world. Vol. 14. Lanham, MD: Scarecrow Press. ISBN 978-0-8108-5075-0.
