= Culture of Belgium =

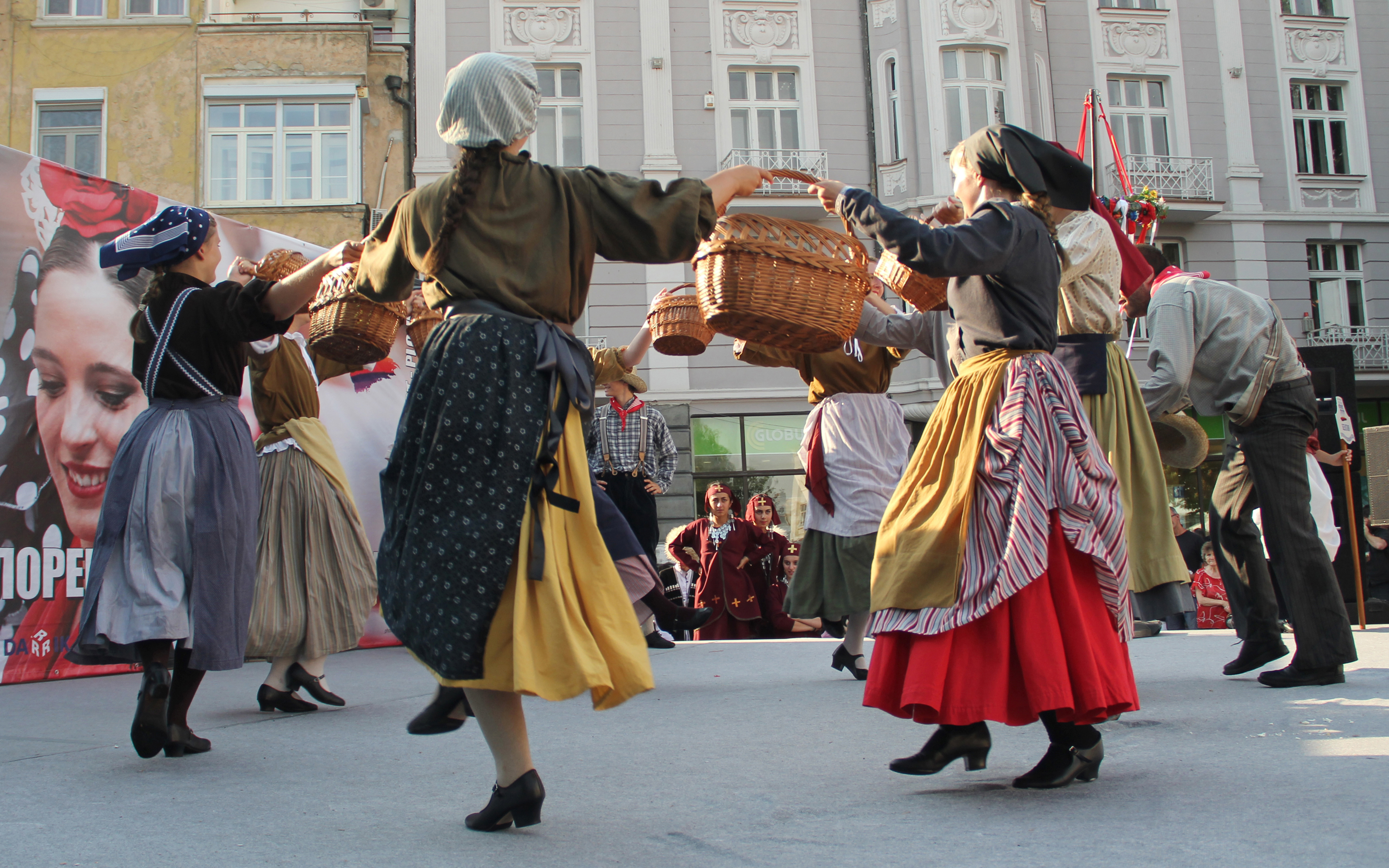
Belgian folk dance group at the International Folklore Festival in Plovdiv, Bulgaria

Stations of the Cross within the Cathedral of Our Lady in Antwerp

The culture of Belgium involves both the aspects shared by all Belgians regardless of the language they speak and the differences between the main cultural communities: the Dutch-speaking Belgians (mostly Flemish) and the French-speaking Belgians (mostly Walloons and Brusselians). Most Belgians view their culture as an integral part of European culture.

The territory corresponding to present-day Belgium having always been located at the meeting point of Germanic and Latin Europe, it benefited from a rich cross-fertilization of cultures for centuries. Due to its strategic position in the heart of Europe, Belgium has been at the origin of many European artistic and cultural movements.

Famous elements of Belgian culture include gastronomy (Belgian beers, fries, chocolate, waffles, etc.), the comic strip tradition (Tintin, The Smurfs, Spirou & Fantasio, Marsupilami, Lucky Luke, Suske en Wiske, etc.), painting and architecture (Mosan, Early Netherlandish, Flemish Renaissance and Baroque art, as well as major examples of Romanesque, Gothic, Renaissance, Baroque and Art Nouveau architecture), folklore, and surrealism.

Since modern culture is more than ever related to languages (theatre, media, literature, etc), modern Belgian cultural life has tended to develop in each linguistic community (with common elements however). Members of each of the two main linguistic groups generally make their cultural choices from within their own language community, and then, when going beyond, the Flemish draw intensively from both English-speaking culture (which dominates sciences, professional life and most news media) and the Netherlands, whereas French-speakers tend to focus more on cultural life in France and elsewhere in the French-speaking world.

Minorities, such as the Jews who have formed a component of Belgian culture — in particular that of Antwerp — for over five hundred years, have some specific cultural aspects.

== Art ==
=== Painting ===
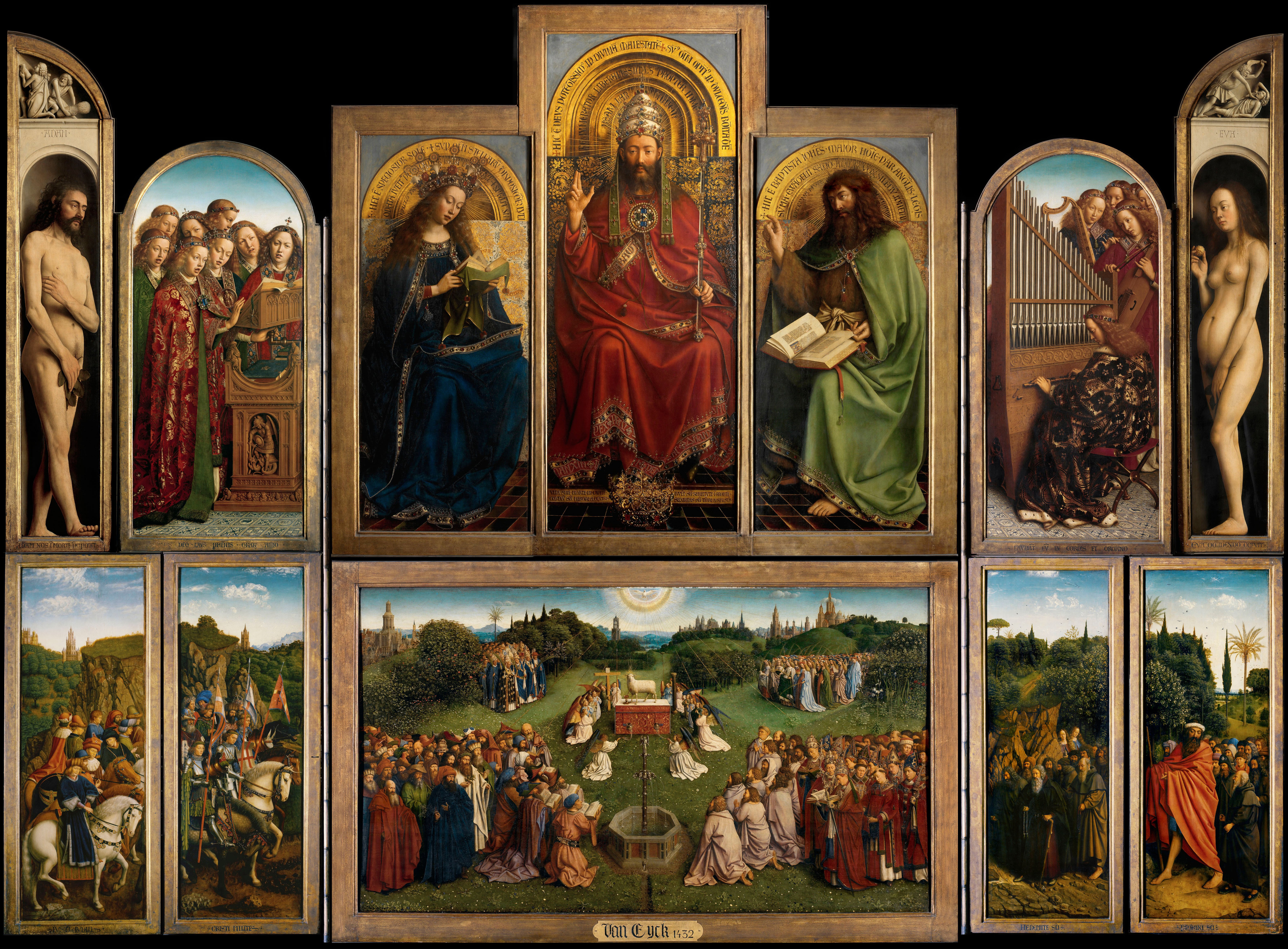
The Ghent Altarpiece: The Adoration of the Mystic Lamb (interior view), painted 1432 by van Eyck

Belgium's contributions to painting have been especially rich. Mosan art, Early Netherlandish painting, the Flemish Renaissance, and Baroque painting are milestones in the history of art. While 15th-century art in the Low Countries is dominated by the religious paintings of Jan van Eyck and Rogier van der Weyden, the 16th century is characterised by a broader panel of styles such as Peter Brueghel's landscape paintings and Lambert Lombard's representation of the antique. Though the Baroque style of Peter Paul Rubens and Anthony van Dyck flourished in the early 17th century in the Southern Netherlands, it gradually declined thereafter.

During the 19th and 20th centuries, many original romantic, expressionist and surrealist Belgian painters emerged, including James Ensor and other artists belonging to the Les XX group, Constant Permeke, Paul Delvaux and René Magritte. The avant-garde CoBrA movement appeared in the 1950s, while the sculptor Panamarenko remains a remarkable figure in contemporary art. Multidisciplinary artists Jan Fabre, Wim Delvoye and the painter Luc Tuymans are other internationally renowned figures on the contemporary art scene.

=== Comics ===
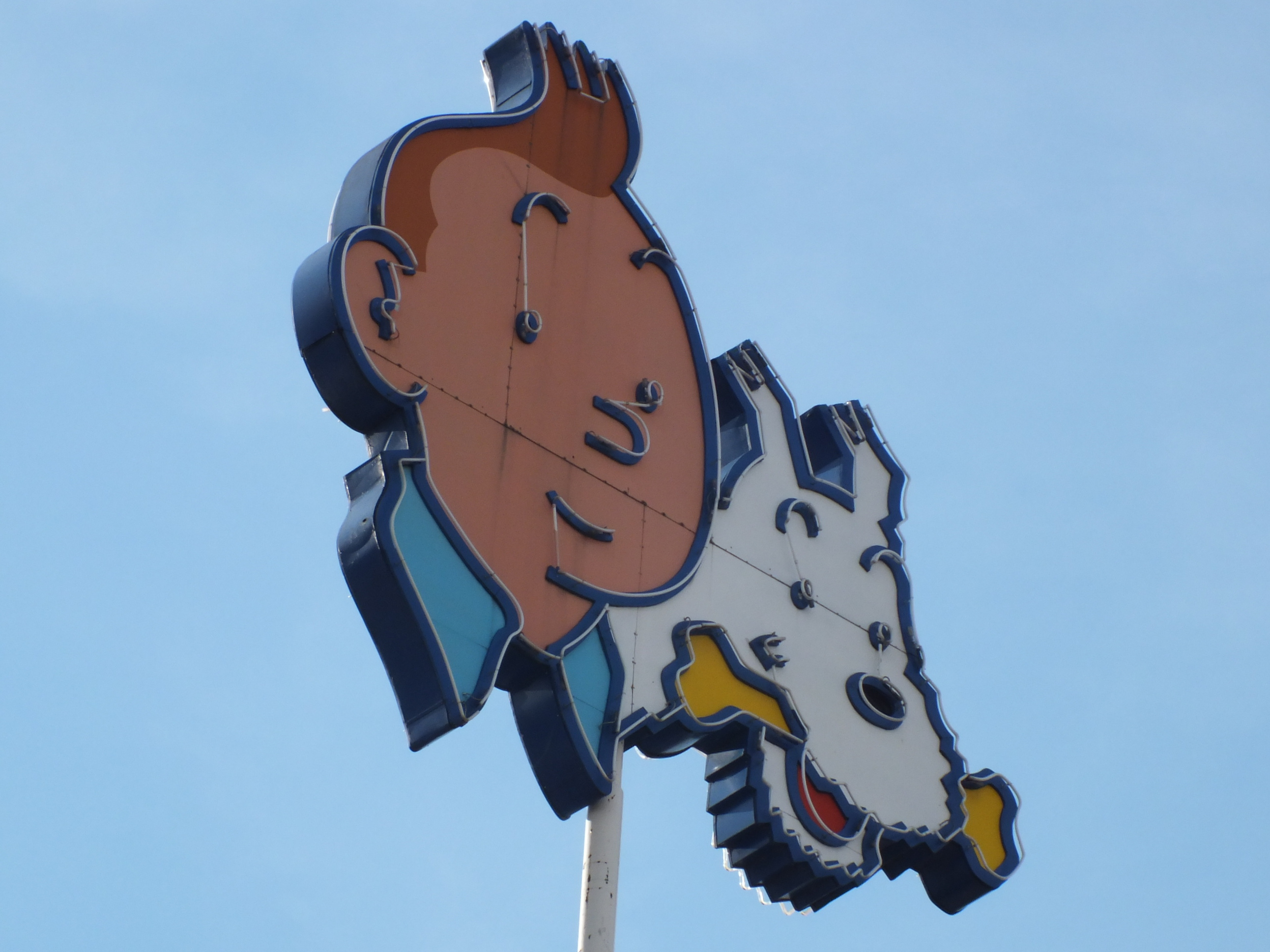
Tintin and Snowy (Hergé), on the roof of the former headquarters of Le Lombard near Brussels-South railway station

Belgium has numerous well-known cartoonists, such as Hergé (Tintin, Quick and Flupke, Jo, Zette and Jocko), Peyo (The Smurfs, Johan and Peewit), Franquin (Spirou and Fantasio, Marsupilami, Gaston), Willy Vandersteen (Suske en Wiske, De Rode Ridder, Bessy), Morris (Lucky Luke), Edgar P. Jacobs (Blake and Mortimer), Jef Nys (Jommeke), Marc Sleen (Nero, Piet Fluwijn en Bolleke, De Lustige Kapoentjes), Jean Roba (Boule et Bill), and Dupa (Cubitus). More recently, Jean Van Hamme (XIII, Largo Winch, Thorgal), Raoul Cauvin (Les Tuniques Bleues, Agent 212), François Schuiten and Benoît Peeters (Les Cités Obscures) are among the most read cartoonists.

Belgium is home to some of the most important European comics magazines and publishers, with Dupuis (Spirou magazine), Le Lombard (Tintin magazine) and Casterman.

=== Museums ===
Some of the main museums in Belgium are the Royal Museums of Fine Arts of Belgium in Brussels, which has artworks of many periods, including a large René Magritte collection; the Royal Museum for Fine Arts in Antwerp, which has an admirable collection of works by Peter Paul Rubens; the Groeningemuseum in Bruges, with the Flemish Primitives; and the Museum aan de Stroom (MAS) in Antwerp, which is located on 't eilandje and is the biggest museum in Belgium.

Furthermore, the Plantin-Moretus Museum in Antwerp, a UNESCO World Heritage Site, is the complete factory of the largest 17th-century publishing house.

== Architecture ==
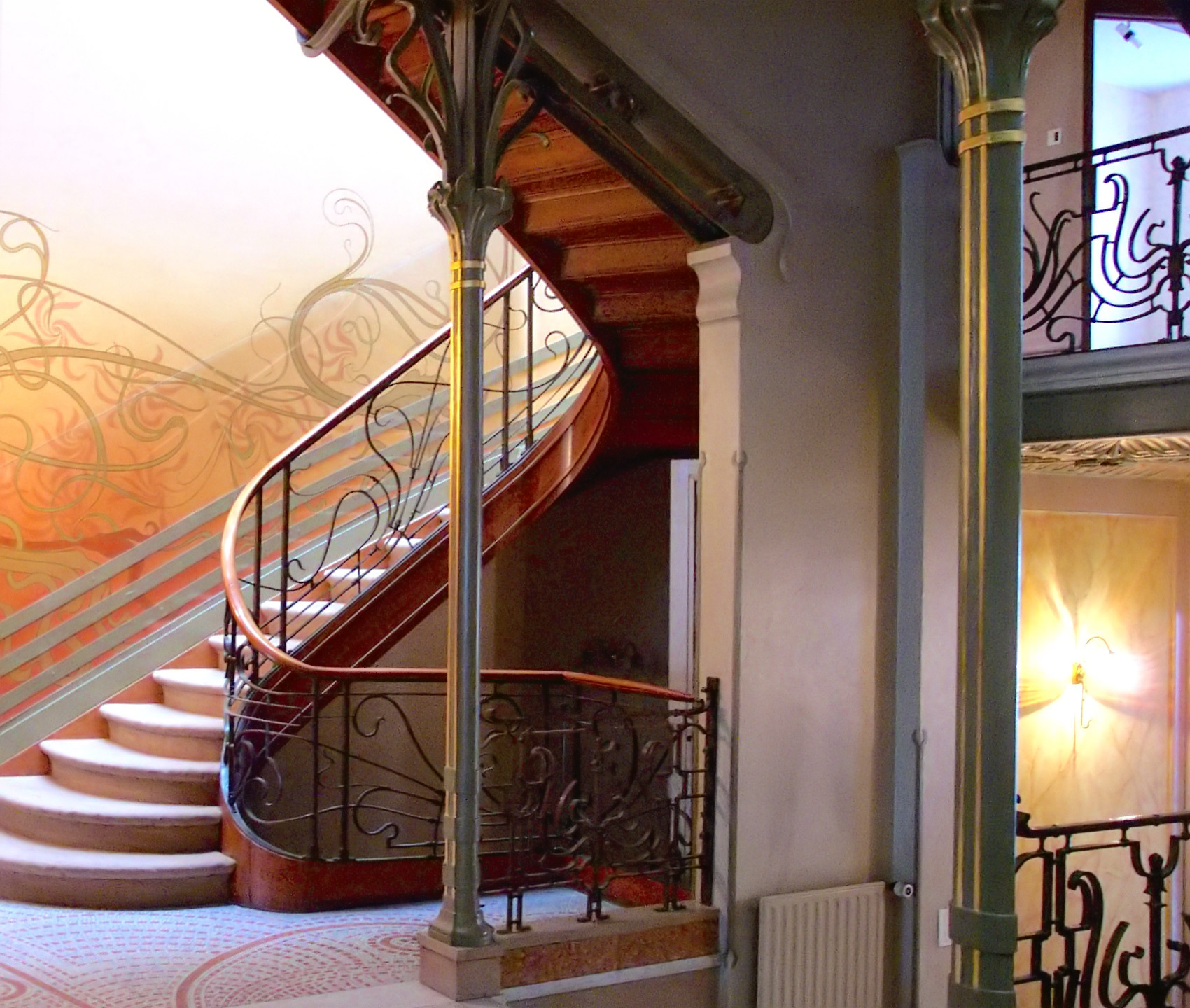
Interior of the Hôtel Tassel in Brussels, by Victor Horta (1892–93)

Examples of Belgian architecture include the Romanesque Collegiate Church of St. Gertrude in Nivelles (1046) and the Cathedral of Our Lady in Tournai, the Gothic 15th-century Cathedral of Our Lady in Antwerp and the Baroque Grand-Place/Grote Markt (main square) in Brussels. Mosan style is typical of the architecture within the Prince-Bishopric of Liège.

Belgian contributions to architecture also continued into the 19th and 20th centuries, including the work of Victor Horta, Paul Hankar and Henry van de Velde, who were major initiators of the Art Nouveau style in Belgium and abroad.

== Literature ==
Belgium has produced several well-known authors, including the poets Emile Verhaeren, Guido Gezelle, Robert Goffin, Paul van Ostaijen, and Henri Michaux, as well as the novelists Cyriel Buysse, Hendrik Conscience, Stijn Streuvels, Charles de Coster, Willem Elsschot, Michel de Ghelderode, Georges Simenon, Louis Paul Boon, Suzanne Lilar, Hugo Claus, Pierre Mertens, Ernest Claes, and Amélie Nothomb. The poet and playwright Maurice Maeterlinck won the Nobel Prize in Literature in 1911.

Belgian literature was more cohesive in the past but is now divided based on linguistic lines. Until the mid-20th century, Belgian writers more often wrote in French even if they were Flemish, due both to the then-dominant position of that language in worldwide culture as well as within Belgium itself (e.g. Suzanne Lilar, Emile Verhaeren, and Maurice Maeterlinck). As the Flemish movement grew in importance, Dutch-penned authors became increasingly prominent in Flanders and even played an important role in the said movement (e.g. Hendrik Conscience). Important contemporary Flemish authors are Tom Lanoye or Dimitri Verhulst.

Belgian francophone literature is sometimes difficult to distinguish from French literature as a whole, because several great French authors went to Belgium for refuge (e.g. Apollinaire, Baudelaire, Rimbaud, Verlaine, and more recently Eric-Emmanuel Schmitt) and conversely, top French-speaking writers sometimes settle in Paris (e.g. Simenon and Amélie Nothomb). Belgian francophone literature is characterised by authors who achieved a nationwide success in Belgium while being little known in France, and shares traits that are perceived as typically Belgian: use of black humour, self-derision, surrealism and absurdism (in a similar vein as Belgian painters such as René Magritte), as well as references to Belgian history and society (such as Belgian royalty, language conflicts, former colony of the Congo, Belgian beers and gastronomy, and whatever is typically Belgian) and they are often active in Belgian medias as columnists or entertainers. Such authors include Thomas Gunzig, Juan d'Oultremont, and Jacques Mercier.

There have also been writers in the Walloon language, such as Nicolas Defrecheux and Edouard Remouchamps.

== Cinema ==
Belgian cinema has brought a number of mainly Flemish novels to life on-screen. Notable examples include De Witte (1934, remake as De Witte van Sichem, 1980); De man die zijn haar kort liet knippen (1965); Mira (1971); Malpertuis (1971); De loteling (1974); Dood van een non (1975); Pallieter (1976); De komst van Joachim Stiller (1976); De Leeuw van Vlaanderen (1985); and Daens (1992).

Belgian films have been awarded several times at the Cannes Film Festival and in other less-known festivals. They are generally made with a small budget, and are mostly funded by the regional governments (the Vlaams Audiovisueel Fonds, and Wallimage, among others) and private corporations by means of sponsorship and product placement.

Famous Belgian directors include André Delvaux, Stijn Coninx, Chantal Akerman, Luc and Jean-Pierre Dardenne; well-known actors include Jean-Claude Van Damme, Jan Decleir and Marie Gillain; and successful films include Bullhead, Man Bites Dog and The Alzheimer Affair.

== Music ==
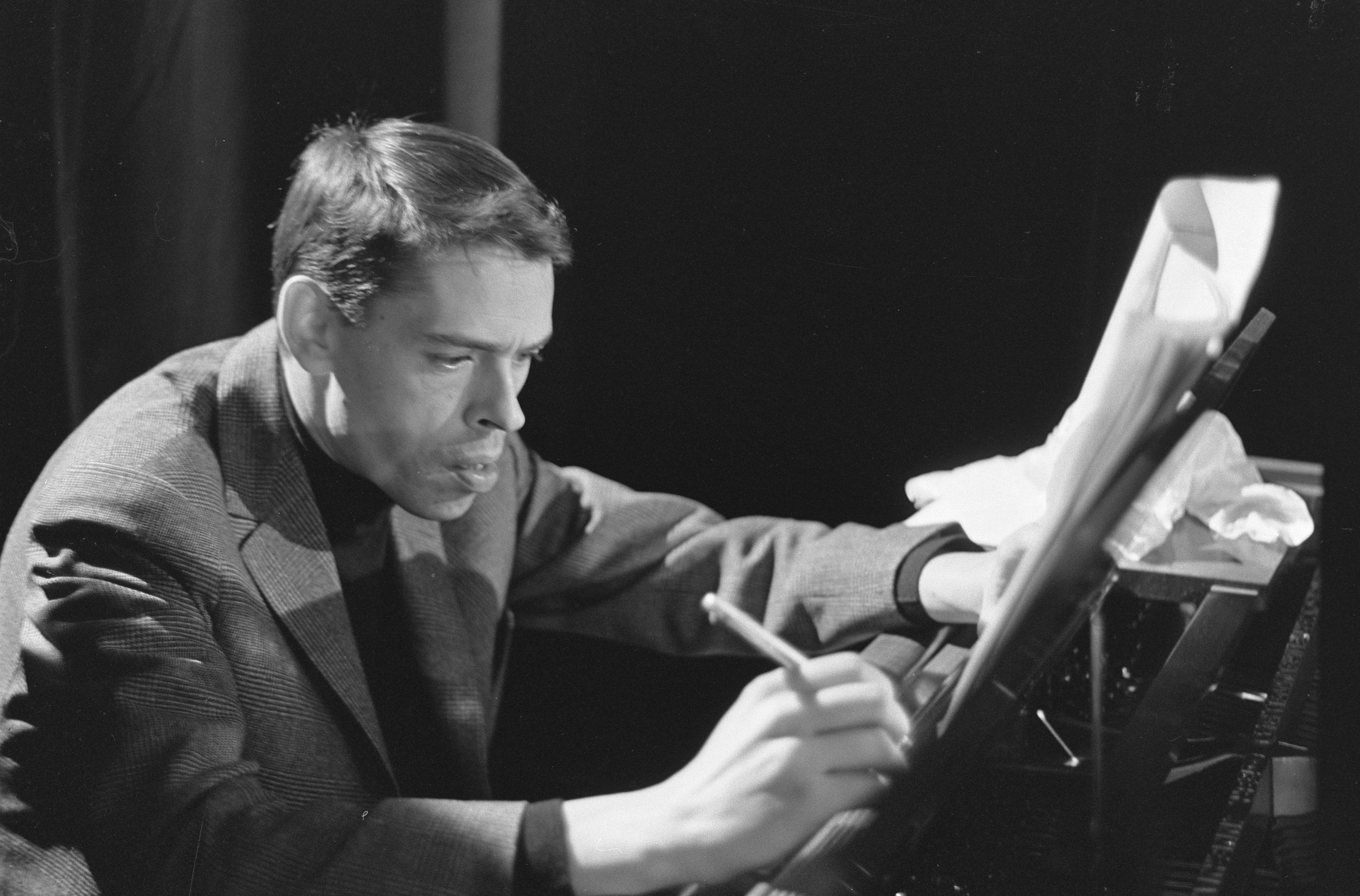
Jacques Brel

The vocal music of the Franco-Flemish School developed in the southern part of the Low Countries and was an important contribution to Renaissance culture. Many great medieval and Renaissance composers, such as Gilles Binchois, Orlande de Lassus, Guillaume Dufay, Heinrich Isaac, and Jacob Obrecht came from the area which is now Belgium.

In the 19th and 20th centuries, there was an emergence of major violinists, such as Henri Vieuxtemps, Eugène Ysaÿe and Arthur Grumiaux. Adolphe Sax, the inventor of the saxophone, was born in Belgium, and so were many important classical composers. One of the most famous is César Franck, but Guillaume Lekeu and Wim Mertens are also noteworthy.

Contemporary popular music in Belgium is also of repute. Well-known singers include Lara Fabian, Stromae, Jacques Brel, Angèle, Arno, Maurane, Bobbejaan Schoepen, Salvatore Adamo, Philippe Lafontaine and Pierre Rapsat. Other popular Belgian pop acts include Axelle Red, Vaya Con Dios, Kate Ryan, Pommelien Thijs, Camille Dhont, Metejoor and K3. In rock/pop music, Telex, Front 242, K's Choice, Hooverphonic, Zap Mama, Soulwax and dEUS are well known. In the heavy metal scene, bands like Machiavel, Channel Zero and Enthroned have a worldwide fan-base. Belgium has a very active jazz scene that is achieving international recognition with bands like Aka Moon, Maak's Spirit and Octurn. Harmonicist Toots Thielemans, guitarist Philip Catherine and Django Reinhardt are probably the best known Belgian jazz musicians. Belgian hip-hop started with the rise of Starflam, CNN (a Brussels-based crew) and 't Hof van Commerce in the mid-1990s. The country has also influenced electronic music with a.o. Front 242, Praga Khan (also known as Lords of Acid), Dimitri Vegas & Like Mike and 2 Many DJ's.

Belgium is also home to some very popular music festivals such as Tomorrowland, Rock Werchter and Pukkelpop.

== Fashion ==
Belgium is also home to a number of successful fashion designers. For instance, in the 1980s, Antwerp's Royal Academy of Fine Arts produced important fashion trendsetters, known as the Antwerp Six.

== Cuisine ==
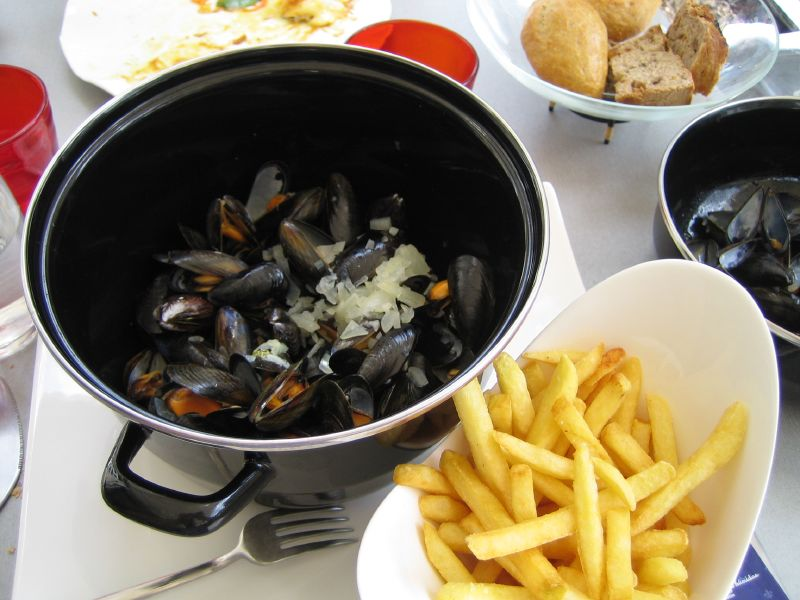
Moules-frites or mosselen met friet is a representative dish of Belgium.

Belgium is famous for beer, chocolate, waffles and French fries. The national dishes are "steak and fries", and "mussels with fries". (Note: Contrarily to what the text suggests, the season starts as early as July and lasts through April.) Many highly ranked Belgian restaurants can be found in the most influential restaurant guides, such as the Michelin Guide. One of the many beers with high prestige is the ale produced by the Trappist monks. Traditionally each abbey's beer is served in its own glass (the forms, heights and widths are different). Six of the eleven breweries sanctioned to brew Trappist beer are Belgian.

Although Belgian gastronomy is connected to French cuisine, some recipes were reputedly invented there, such as French fries (despite the name, although their exact place of origin is uncertain), Flemish Stew (a beef stew with beer, mustard and bay laurel), speculaas (or speculoos in French, a sort of cinnamon and ginger-flavoured shortcrust biscuit), Brussels waffles (and their variant, Liège waffles), waterzooi (a broth made with chicken or fish, cream and vegetables), endive with bechamel sauce, Brussels sprouts, Belgian pralines (Belgium has some of the most renowned chocolate houses), charcuterie (deli meats) and Paling in 't groen (river eels in a sauce of green herbs).

Brands of Belgian chocolate and pralines, like Côte d'Or, Neuhaus, Leonidas and Godiva are famous, as well as independent producers such as Burie and Del Rey in Antwerp and Mary's in Brussels. Belgium produces over 1100 varieties of beer. The Trappist beer of the Abbey of Westvleteren has repeatedly been rated the world's best beer. The biggest brewer in the world by volume is Anheuser-Busch InBev, based in Leuven.

== Folklore ==
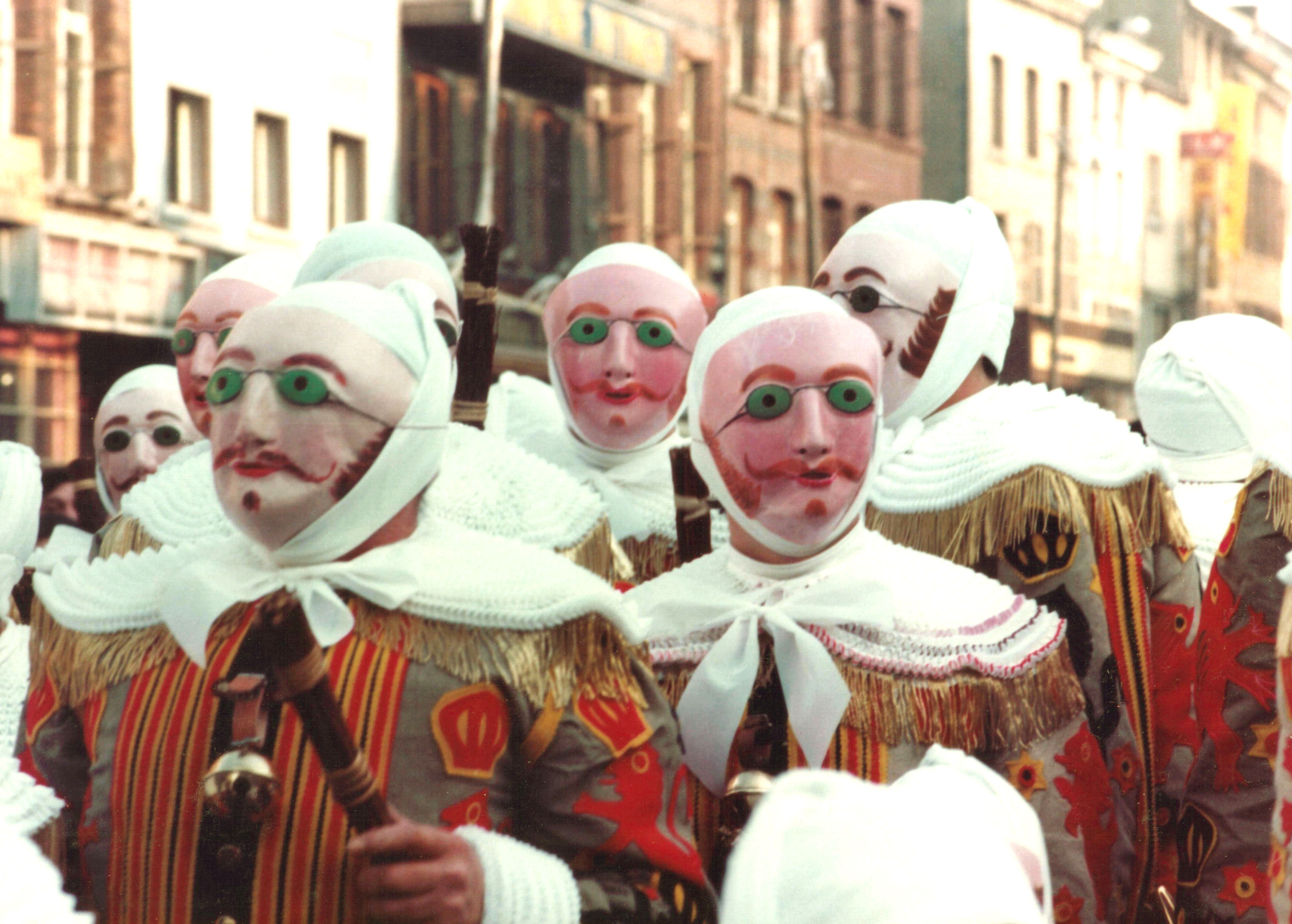
The Gilles of Binche, in costume, wearing wax masks

Folklore plays a major role in Belgium's cultural life; the country has a comparatively high number of processions, cavalcades, parades, ommegangs, ducasses, (Note: The Dutch word ommegang is here used in the sense of an entirely or mainly non-religious procession, or the non-religious part thereof—see also its article on the Dutch-language Wikipedia; the Processional Giants of Brussels, Dendermonde and Mechelen mentioned in this paragraph are part of each city's ommegang. The French word ducasse refers also to a procession; the mentioned Processional Giants of Ath and Mons are part of each city's ducasse.) kermesses, and other local festivals, nearly always with an originally religious or mythological background. The three-day Carnival of Binche, near Mons, with its Gilles (men dressed in high, plumed hats and bright costumes) is held just before Lent (the 40 days between Ash Wednesday and Easter). Together with the 'Processional Giants and Dragons' of Ath, Brussels, Dendermonde, Mechelen and Mons, it is recognised by UNESCO as a Masterpiece of the Oral and Intangible Heritage of Humanity.

Other examples are the three-day Carnival of Aalst in February or March; the still very religious processions of the Holy Blood taking place in Bruges in May, the Virga Jesse procession held every seven years in Hasselt, the annual procession of Hanswijk in Mechelen, the 15 August festivities in Liège, and the Walloon festival in Namur. Originated in 1832 and revived in the 1960s, the Gentse Feesten (a music and theatre festival organised in Ghent around Belgian National Day, on 21 July) have become a modern tradition. Several of these festivals include sporting competitions, such as cycling, and many fall under the category of kermesses.

A major non-official holiday is Saint Nicholas Day (Dutch: Sinterklaas, French: la Saint-Nicolas), a festivity for children, and in Liège, for students. It takes place each year on 6 December and is a sort of early Christmas. On the evening of 5 December, before going to bed, children put their shoes by the hearth with water or wine and a carrot for Saint Nicholas's horse or donkey. According to tradition, Saint Nicholas comes at night and travels down the chimney. He then takes the food and water or wine, leaves presents, goes back up, feeds his horse or donkey, and continues on his course. He also knows whether children have been good or bad. This holiday is especially loved by children in Belgium and the Netherlands. Dutch immigrants imported the tradition into the United States, where Saint Nicholas is now known as Santa Claus.

== Sport ==
=== Football ===
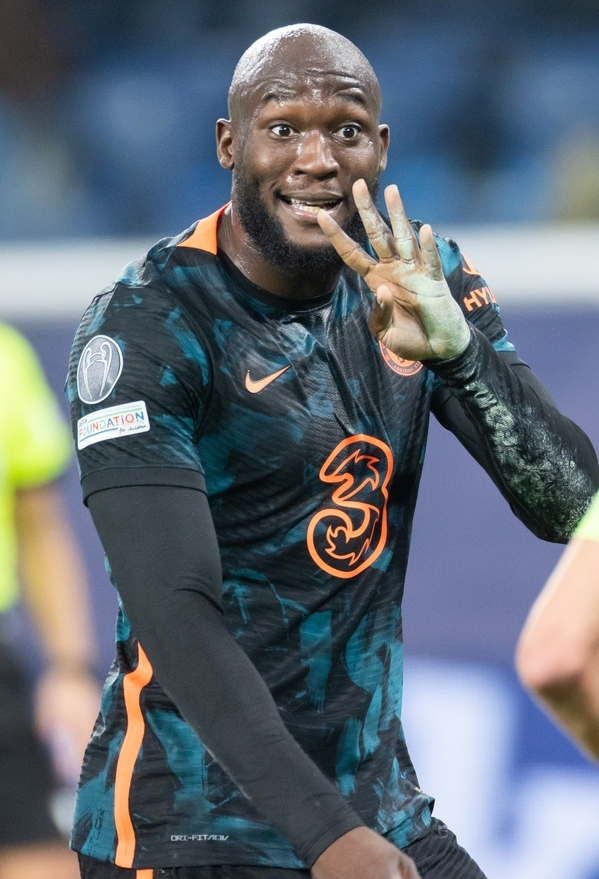
All-time top scorer Romelu Lukaku

The Belgian Football Association, the governing body of football in Belgium, was founded in 1895 and was one of the founding members of the FIFA in 1904. The first Belgian championship was held in 1895 among the 10 founding teams of the Belgian Football Association, and was won by RFC de Liège. As of 2026, R.S.C. Anderlecht is the most successful Belgian team both at national (34 Belgian champion titles) and international (5 European titles) levels. Other successful clubs include Club Brugge K.V. (20 Belgian champion titles), R. Union Saint-Gilloise (12 national titles), Standard Liège (10 national titles) and K.V. Mechelen (4 national titles and 2 European titles). The club with the most Belgian Cup titles is Club Brugge KV (12) followed by RSC Anderlecht (9) and R Standard Liège (8). The 7 European titles won by Belgian clubs were claimed between 1976 and 1988.

The Belgium national team played its first game in 1904 against France. The match ended in a 3–3 draw. Since then, Belgium has qualified for 12 out of 20 World Cups, finishing 3rd in 2018, and for 4 out of the 12 UEFA European Football Championships in which it entered, finishing second in 1980. At the Summer Olympics, Belgium won the gold medal in 1920 and secured a fourth place in 2008.

The most capped player for Belgium is Jan Vertonghen (157 caps), followed by Axel Witsel (140 caps) and Romelu Lukaku (132 caps). Belgium all-time top scorer is Romelu Lukaku with 93 goals. Other past famous players include goalkeepers Jean-Marie Pfaff, Michel Preud'homme and other outfield players like: Armand Swartenbroeks, Raymond Braine, Jef Mermans, Rik Coppens, Jef Jurion, Georges Heylens, Paul Van Himst, Eric Gerets, Jan Ceulemans, Enzo Scifo, Luc Nilis, Eden Hazard and Vincent Kompany. Current well-known Belgian players are Jeremy Doku, Thibaut Courtois, Youri Tielemans, Kevin De Bruyne and Leandro Trossard. In addition to female footballers: Janice Cayman, Tessa Wullaert and Tine De Caigny.

=== Cycling ===
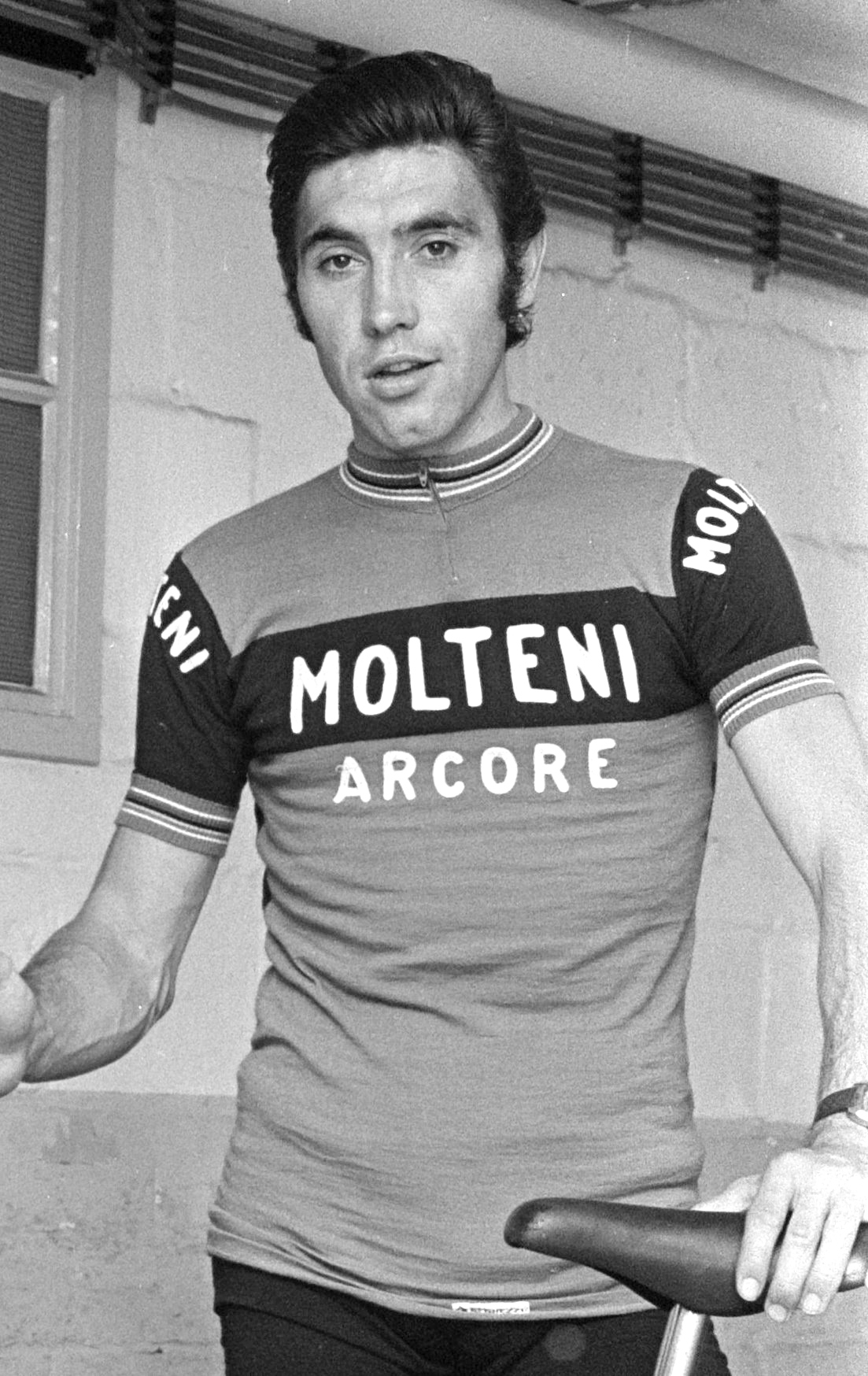
Eddy Merckx in 1973

Cycling is a very popular sport in Belgium. It is governed by the Royal Belgian Cycling League, which is split between the Dutch-speaking WBV and the French-speaking FCWB. Many Belgian cyclists have been successful, and some of the greatest cycle races take place in Belgium, especially in road bicycle racing, though other bicycle racing disciplines such as mountain bike racing or track cycling also count a number of Belgian champions and races. The best Belgian cyclist of all time, Eddy Merckx, nicknamed the Cannibal, won the Tour de France and Giro d'Italia 5 times each, won the Vuelta a España once, the UCI Road World Championship 3 times, had many classic cycle race wins and set the hour record, among other achievements. Belgium has been one of the most successful countries in road cycling since the origins of the sport, with one of the oldest races being held in Belgium, Liège–Bastogne–Liège, which was first held in 1892.

At the Olympic Games, Belgium has won four gold medals for road cycling, with two victories for the Belgian men's team in the team time trial (at the 1948 and 1952 Summer Olympics) and two for André Noyelle and Greg Van Avermaet for the individual race. Belgium has had the most World Championship gold medals (27) with 3 victories by Rik Van Steenbergen and Eddy Merckx and 2 by Georges Ronsse, Briek Schotte, Rik Van Looy and Freddy Maertens. Belgian cyclists have also performed very well in the 3 grand tours. Ten cyclists have won the Tour de France 18 times between them, making of Belgium the country with the most Tour de France wins behind France. Besides Eddy Merckx, Philippe Thys won the most prestigious tour 3 times while Firmin Lambot and Sylvère Maes won it twice. The last Belgian winner at the Tour de France however was Lucien Van Impe in 1976. At the Giro d'Italia, Belgium has had 7 wins, being the second most successful country in terms of wins after Italy. Michel Pollentier and Johan De Muynck (the most recent Belgian to win the Giro in 1978) are with Eddy Merckx the 3 Belgian winners of this tour. Belgium also has had 7 wins at the Vuelta a España, with 2 wins by Gustaaf Deloor, the first winner of the race in 1935 and 1936. The last Belgian winner of the Spanish tour was Remco Evenepoel in 2022.

Many Belgian cyclists have won one of the five monument cycle races. At the Tour of Flanders, Belgium counts 69 wins in 110 editions with 3 wins for Achiel Buysse, Eric Leman, Johan Museeuw and Tom Boonen. Roger De Vlaeminck holds the record of wins at Paris–Roubaix together with Tom Boonen (4), and Belgium is the most successful country in this race with 58 wins in 123 editions. Liège–Bastogne–Liège has been won 61 times out of 112 by Belgian cyclists. Eddy Merckx holds the record of the most individual wins (5). At the Giro di Lombardia, Belgium counts 12 titles in 119 editions, with only Italy performing better. Milan–San Remo was won 7 times by Eddy Merckx, who holds the record of the most wins, and Belgium has won 23 times out of 117, being the second most successful country after Italy in this race. Unlike the grand tours, which have not been won by a Belgian since 1978, cyclists from Belgium are still successful in the monument races. At Paris–Roubaix, Tom Boonen has won 4 times and Johan Museeuw 3 times since 1996, and Peter Van Petegem and Johan Van Summeren have also won the race once each. At the Tour of Flanders, Belgium has 12 wins since 1993, with 3 by Johan Museeuw and Tom Boonen, 2 by Peter Van Petegem and Stijn Devolder and 1 by Andreï Tchmil and Nick Nuyens.

Among the best-known road races in Belgium are two out of the five monuments of cycling: the Tour of Flanders and Liège–Bastogne–Liège. Other classic one day races in Belgium include La Flèche Wallonne, E3 Harelbeke and Gent–Wevelgem, all part of the UCI World Tour, as well as Paris–Brussels, Omloop Het Nieuwsblad, Kuurne–Brussels–Kuurne, Grand Prix de Wallonie and Dwars door Vlaanderen. The best-known stage-races in Belgium are the Tour of Benelux, created in 2005, the Tour of Belgium and the Tour of Wallonie. Belgium has currently two professional cycling teams competing in the UCI ProTour: Etixx–Quick-Step and Lotto–Soudal.

=== Tennis ===
Belgium is well known in tennis for the two champions Justine Henin and Kim Clijsters, who were both WTA World No. 1 ranked player in the 2000s. Clijsters won 41 WTA titles, including three US Open titles and the Australian Open in 2011. Henin won 43 WTA titles, including seven Grand Slam titles (four French Open titles, two US Open titles and the 2004 Australian Open), and a gold medal at the 2004 Summer Olympics.

The Belgium team won the 2001 Fed Cup and finished runner-up in 2006. Belgium hosted each year the Belgian Open from 1987 on, which was replaced by the Proximus Diamond Games in 2002.

Former Belgian tennis champions include Filip Dewulf (2 ATP titles), Christophe Rochus, Sabine Appelmans (7 WTA titles) and Dominique Monami (4 WTA titles).

=== Athletics ===
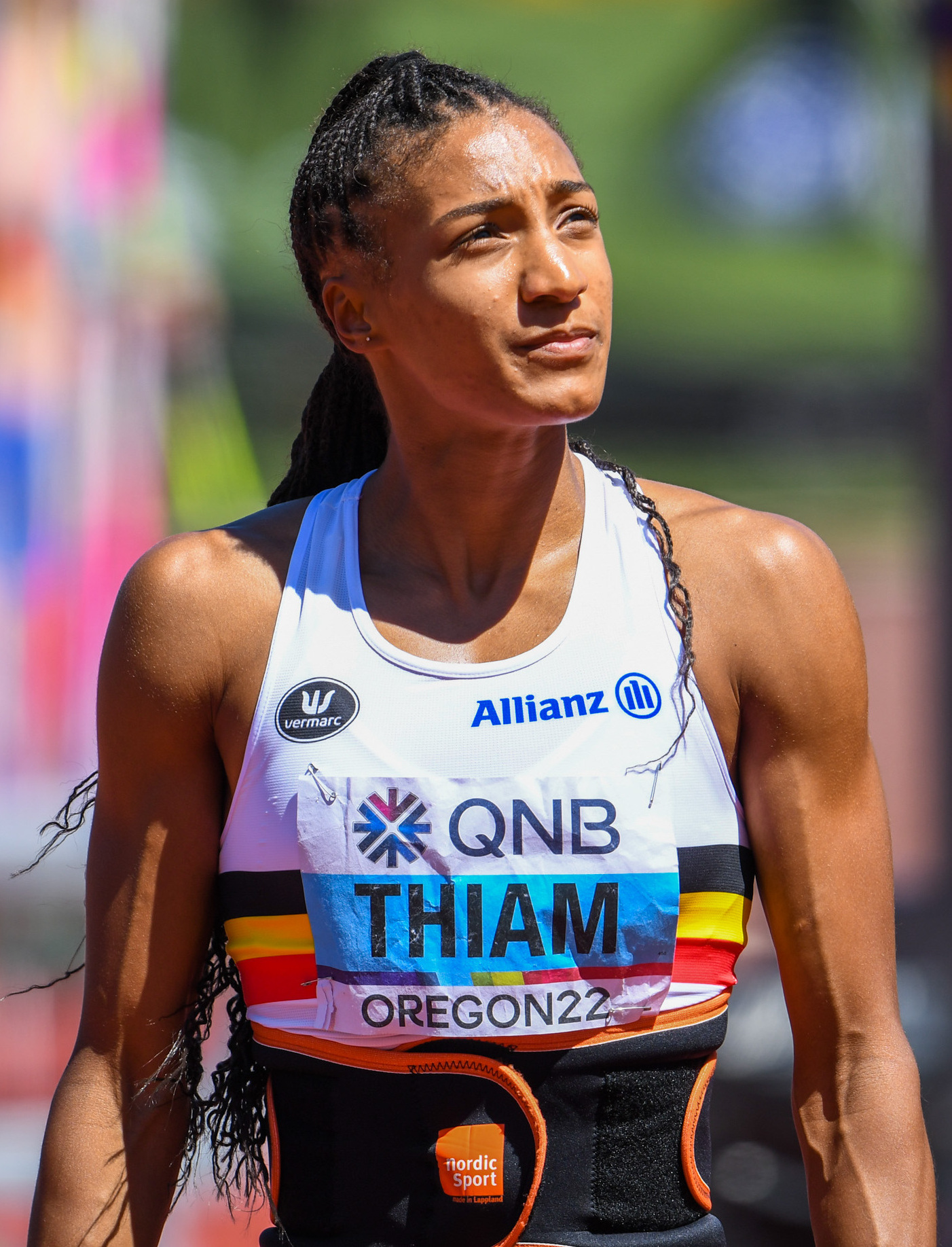
Nafissatou Thiam in 2022

Belgium has hosted a number of major athletics events, beginning with the 1950 European Athletics Championships. It has since hosted the IAAF World Cross Country Championships in 1973, 1991, 2001 and 2004, the IAAF World Half Marathon Championships in 1993 and 2002 and the 2000 European Athletics Indoor Championships (at the Flanders Sports Arena).

Belgium hosts a number of prominent annual competitions across all sections of the sport of athletics. The Memorial Van Damme, Belgium's foremost track and field competition, began in 1977 and is now part of the IAAF Diamond League circuit. Two of the meetings in the Lotto Cross Cup (an annual cross country running series) are sanctioned by the IAAF and European Athletics. Other significant competitions which are part of the European athletics circuit include the Flanders Indoor meeting in Ghent and the KBC Night of Athletics in Heusden. The country has two AIMS-certified marathons: the Antwerp Marathon and the Brussels Marathon. There is also an annual ultramarathon competition called the Nacht van Vlaanderen, a 100 km race which has been held annually since 1980. The meeting has also doubled as the European and IAU World Championships on a number of occasions. Other annual races of note are the Warandeloop, Oostende-Brugge Ten Miles, Kust Marathon, Guldensporenmarathon and the 20 km of Brussels.

Four Belgian athletes have won Olympic gold medals: Nafissatou Thiam (heptathlon, 2016, 2020, 2024), Tia Hellebaut (high jump, 2008), Gaston Roelants (3000 m steeplechase, 1964) and Gaston Reiff (5000 m, 1948). The other Belgian Olympic medalists in athletics are Etienne Gailly (bronze for marathon in 1948), Roger Moens (silver for 800 m in 1960), Emiel Puttemans (silver for 10,000 m in 1972), Karel Lismont (silver for marathon in 1972 and bronze in 1976), Ivo Van Damme (silver for 800 m and 1500 m in 1976), the Belgium Women's 4 × 100 m led by Kim Gevaert (silver in 2008), Bashir Abdi (bronze and silver for marathon in 2020 and 2024, respectively) and Noor Vidts (bronze for heptathlon in 2024).

=== Basketball ===
Basketball is governed by the Royal Belgian Basketball Federation. The best result of the Belgium national team was a 4th place at the EuroBasket 1947. The BNXT League is the top-flight national division, which replaced the Basketball League Belgium in 2021 and since then is shared with the Netherlands, and is played between 18 teams, with 11 of them being Belgian. Belgium has organized the EuroBasket 1977.

The Belgian Cats have gone from an unranked FIBA nation in 2016 to a consistently winning team. Claiming both their 2023 and 2025 titles despite trailing at half-time in both finals, making them only the third nation after the Soviet Union and Spain to successfully defend the EuroBasket Women crown.

Belgium has become a competitive team on the global stage since first time appearance in 2018 FIBA Women's Basketball World Cup with 4th-place finish. Four years later they competed in the 2022 edition. They earned the entry ticket into thd historic Summer Olympics, participation in the 2020 edition. They qualified into semifinals of the 2024 Paris Olympics.

Belgium will be the co-host for the EuroBasket Women 2027 along with Finland, Sweden and Lithuania.

== See also ==
- Culture of Brussels
- Europalia
- "Greatest Belgian" polls in 2005:
  - De Grootste Belg
  - Les plus grands Belges
