= Josyne van Beethoven =

- Born: Josina Francisca van Vlasselaer c. 1540; Kampenhout
- Died: September 14, 1595 (c. 55); Grand-Place, Brussels
- Other names: Josijne van Beethoven
- Citizenship: Dutchy of Brabant
- Criminal charges: Witchcraft
- Criminal penalty: Burning at the stake
- Spouse: Aert van Beethoven
- Children: 4
- Parents: Jan Vleskens; Margareta Bloems
- Relatives: Ludwig van Beethoven (8th great-grandson)

Josyne or Josijne van Beethoven, born Josina Francisca van Vlasselaer (Kampenhout, c. 1540 – Brussels, 14 September 1595), was a woman executed for witchcraft in Brussels in 1595. She was married to Aert (Arnold) van Beethoven, with whom she had four children. Through this lineage she was an ancestor of the composer Ludwig van Beethoven.

== Family background ==
Josyne van Vlasselaer was born in Kampenhout around 1540, the daughter of Jan Vleskens (van Vlasselaer) and Margareta Bloems. Her parents married around 1535 and owned land in Bertem. Jan died in 1575, leaving Margareta with two daughters: Lisbeth, who married Jan van der Veken, and Josyne, who married Aert van Beethoven around 1567.

Aert van Beethoven, born c. 1535, was about ten years older than Josyne. The couple lived in Relst and managed a modest but relatively prosperous farmstead, sometimes described as a small “manor farm”. They had four children, three sons and one daughter. As opportunities on the parental farm were limited, the sons established branches of the van Beethoven family in neighbouring villages.

== Arrest and trial ==
On 5 August 1595, Josyne van Beethoven was arrested in Kampenhout by order of the mayor, Jan Baptiste van Spoelberch, following accusations of witchcraft. Testimonies alleged that livestock had died after she had passed by: four horses were said to have collapsed suddenly, a horse reportedly urinated blood before dying of colic, and a cow produced sour milk.

She was initially imprisoned in Treurenberg Gate and later transferred to the Steenpoort. Despite repeated denials, she was interrogated under torture. On 13 September she confessed and also implicated her neighbour Anna Verstande (Versande), who was subsequently banished.

== Execution ==
Josyne van Beethoven was sentenced to burning at the stake, with confiscation of her property in favour of the crown. On the eve of her execution she attempted suicide by ingesting pottery shards but survived. She was executed on 14 September 1595 on the Grand-Place.

Her husband Aert van Beethoven petitioned the Court of Audit for clemency in the matter of confiscation. He was allowed to retain half of the marital property but was obliged to pay the costs of his wife’s arrest, imprisonment, torture, and execution.

Aert later remarried Petronella Geerts in 1600, with whom he had another son, Jan. He died in 1609 at the age of 74.

== Legacy ==
Josyne van Beethoven’s case illustrates the witch persecutions that took place in the Low Countries during the late 16th century. She is also remembered as a direct ancestor of the composer Ludwig van Beethoven.
