= Jazz Station =

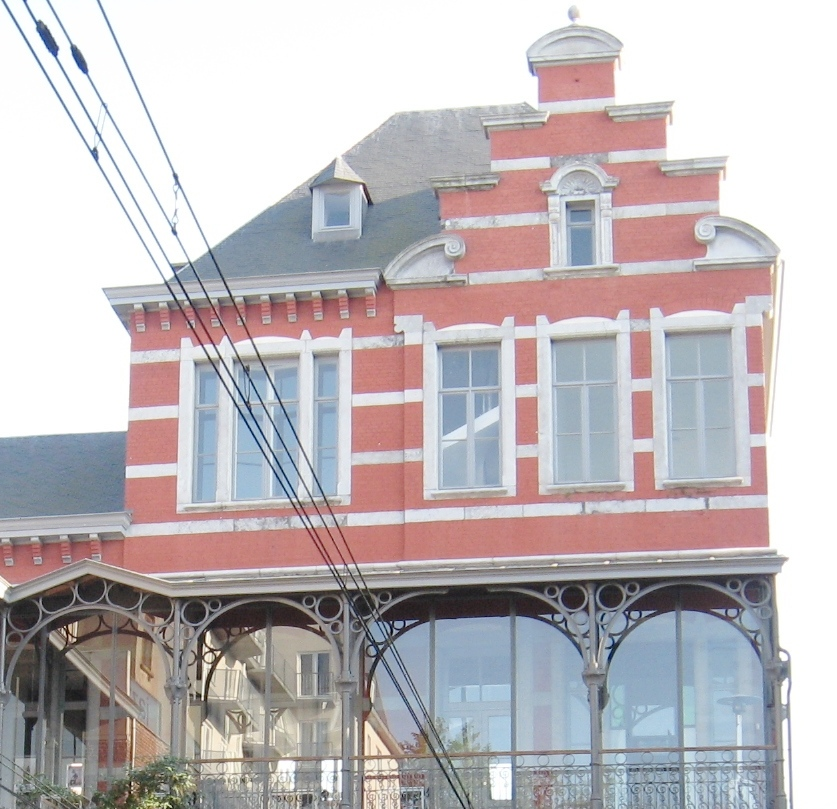
- The former train station Leuvensesteenweg
- Interactive map of Jazz Station
- Location: Saint-Josse-ten-Noode, Brussels, Belgium
- Coordinates: 50°51′1.971″N 4°22′49.555″E
- Owner: Jean Demannez (initiative)
- Type: Club and exposition venue
- Event: Jazz

Construction
- Opened: 30 September 2005

Website
- www.jazzstation.be

Jazz Station is a jazz club and exhibition venue in Saint-Josse-ten-Noode in the Belgian district of Brussels.

== History ==
Jazz Station was established as an exhibition venue in the former train station at Leuvensesteenweg and was inaugurated on 30 September 2005. The initiative comes from Jean Demannez (first), a jazz drummer and from 1999 to 2012 mayor of Saint-Josse-ten-Noode. The opening was conducted by the mayor.

The showed a variety of jazz related pieces, including records, photos, posters, magazines and articles. Part of the collection comes from jazz historian Robert Pernet, Robert Pernet and jazz publicist Marc Danval; both are jazz musicians. Les Lundis d'Hortense, a Belgian society of jazz musicians organizes concerts on a weekly base. Varying exhibitions are shown, and the venue maintains an archive and serves as a meeting place for jazz musicians. Young composers can have it performed by the big band of Jazz Station. This ensemble is directed by Michel Parré.
