= Saint-Josse-ten-Noode =

Municipality of the Brussels-Capital Region, Belgium

Saint-Josse-ten-Noode: Sint-Joost-ten-Node (Dutch)
- Municipality
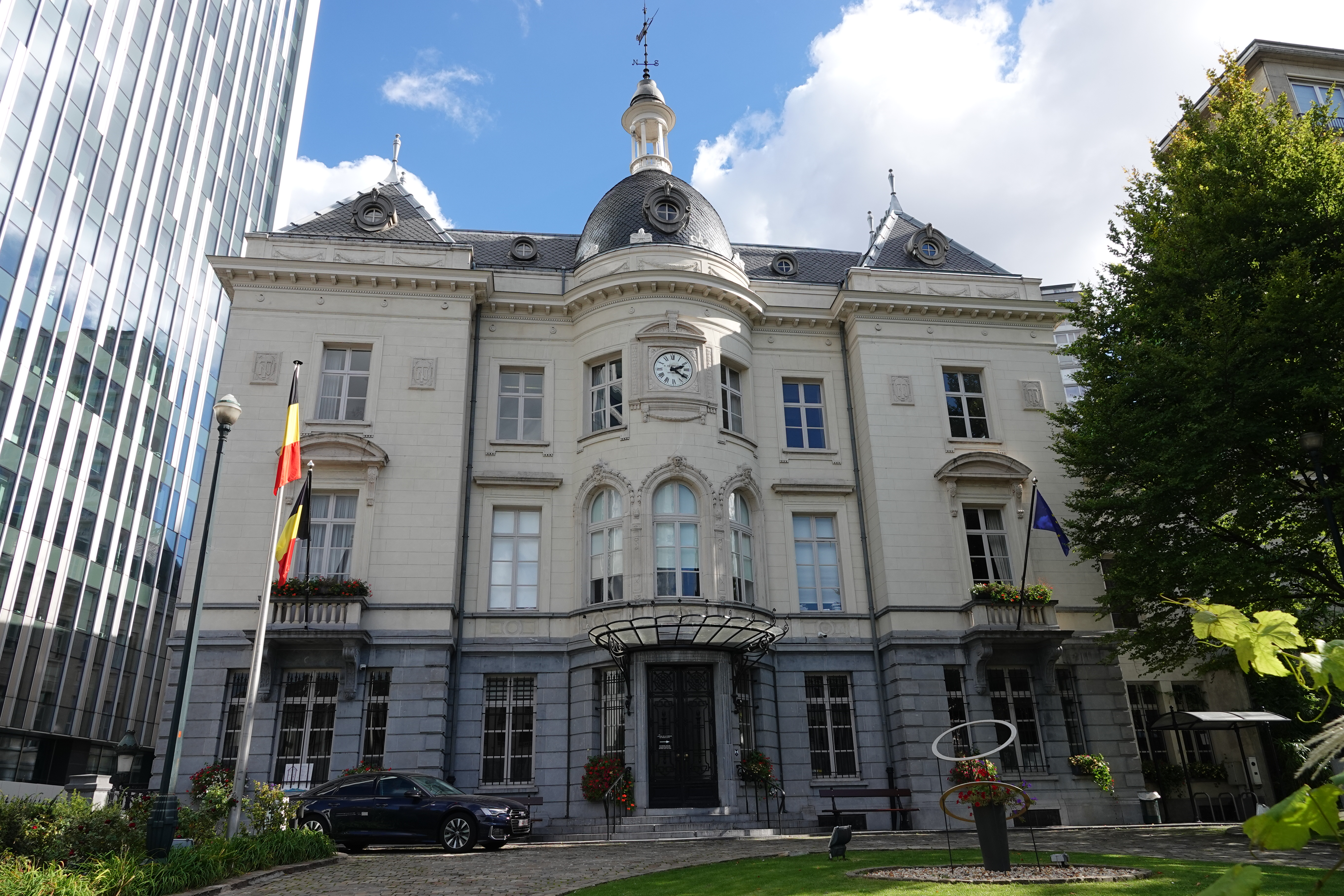
- Saint-Josse-ten-Noode's Municipal Hall

- Flag Coat of arms

- Interactive map of Saint-Josse-ten-Noode
- Location in Belgium
- Coordinates: 50°51′16″N 04°22′13″E
- Country: Belgium
- Community: Flemish Community; French Community
- Region: Brussels-Capital
- Arrondissement: Brussels-Capital

Government
  - Mayor: Emir Kir
  - Governing party: LB

Area
  - Total: 1.16 km^{2} (0.45 sq mi)

Population (2020-01-01)
  - Total: 27,497
  - Density: 23,700/km^{2} (61,400/sq mi)
- Postal codes: 1210
- NIS code: 21014
- Area codes: 02
- Website: sjtn.brussels/en (in English) sjtn.brussels/fr (in French) sjtn.brussels/nl (in Dutch)

Saint-Josse-ten-Noode (French, pronounced [sɛ̃ ʒɔs tœn nod]) or Sint-Joost-ten-Node (Dutch, pronounced [sɪɲˌtɕoːstɛˈnoːdə]), often simply called Saint-Josse in French or Sint-Joost in Dutch, is one of the 19 municipalities of the Brussels-Capital Region, Belgium. Located in the north-eastern part of the region, it is bordered by the City of Brussels and Schaerbeek.

As of 1 January 2026, the municipality had a population of 27,003. The total area is 1.16 km^{2} (0.45 sq mi), which gives a population density of 23,278/km^{2} (60,290/sq mi). From a total of 581 municipalities in Belgium, Saint-Josse is both the smallest in area size and the most densely populated. Like all municipalities in Brussels, it is officially bilingual (French–Dutch).

== History ==
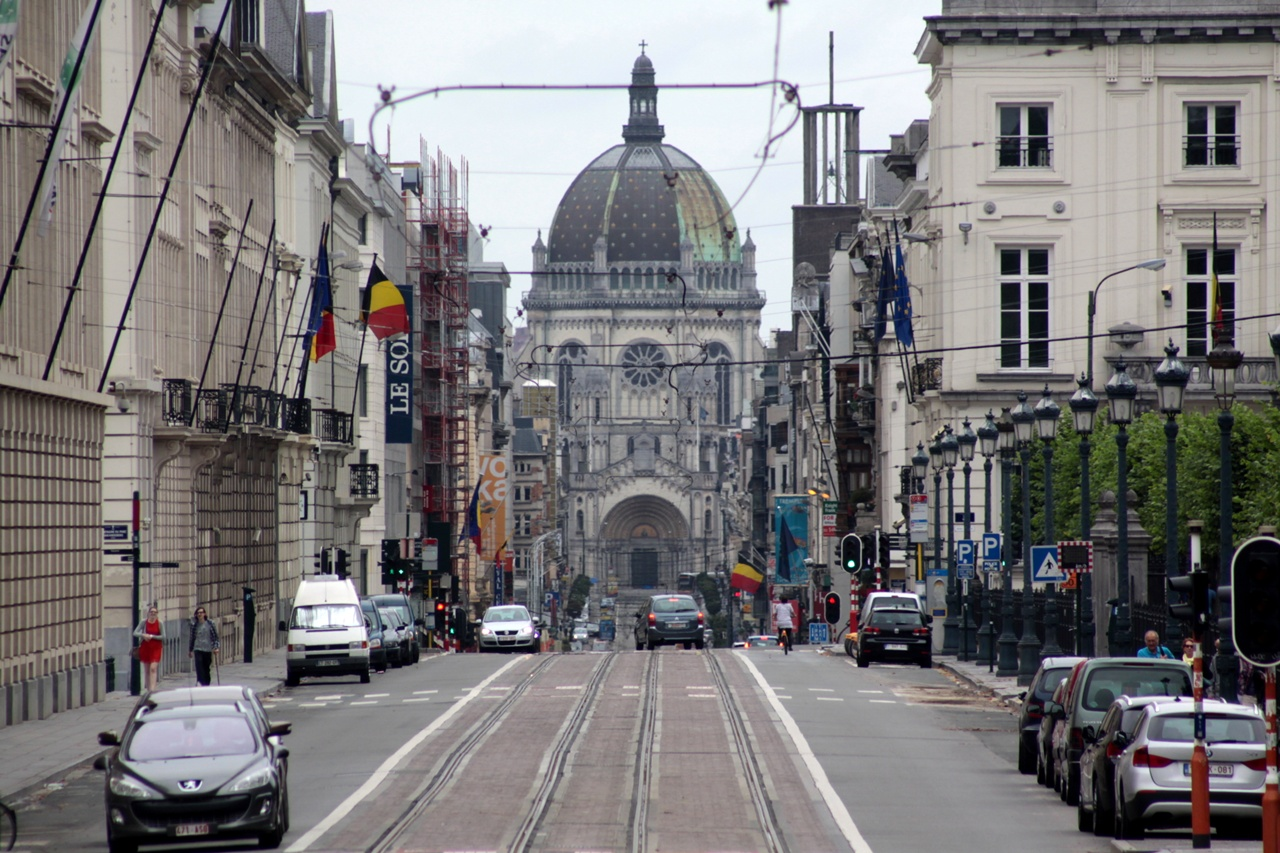
A view along the Rue Royale / Koningsstraat facing Saint Mary's Royal Church in neighbouring Schaerbeek

Named after Saint Judoc, Saint-Josse was originally a farming village on the outskirts of Brussels. In the centuries before the dismantling of the ramparts encircling Brussels, noblemen built country estates there, the most notable of which was the Castle of the Dukes of Brabant, built by Philip the Good in 1456. The area surrounding that castle was planted with wine groves, which explains the presence of the bushel of grapes in the municipality's coat of arms.

Following the demolition of the ramparts, Saint-Josse was one of the first areas outside Brussels to urbanise. The rich built houses around the new boulevards and higher parts of the municipality, while industries and workers' cottages were built in the lower-lying part close to the river Senne. In 1855, 58% of Saint-Josse's land area was annexed by the City of Brussels to make way for the Square Ambiorix/Ambiorixsquare, the Square Marguerite/Margaretasquare, the Square Marie-Louise/Maria-Louizasquare and the Avenue Palmerston/Palmerstonlaan of the newly created Leopold Quarter (now the European Quarter).

According to an inventory of architecture commissioned by the Brussels Region, Saint-Josse has on average the oldest buildings of all 19 Brussels municipalities.

== Demographics ==
As of 2026, the population is 27,003, of which 52.3% are male, and 47.7% are female. Minors make up 20.6% of the population, and seniors make up 9.6%.

Historical population

Year	Pop.	±%
1846	14,850	—
1856	17,149	+15.5%
1866	21,915	+27.8%
1876	26,492	+20.9%
1880	28,052	+5.9%
1890	29,709	+5.9%
1900	32,140	+8.2%
1910	31,865	−0.9%
1920	31,843	−0.1%

Year	Pop.	±%
1930	30,917	−2.9%
1947	28,155	−8.9%
1961	24,463	−13.1%
1970	23,633	−3.4%
1981	20,381	−13.8%
1991	21,317	+4.6%
2001	22,208	+4.2%
2011	27,358	+23.2%
2021	27,124	−0.9%

Source: Statbel

=== Foreign population ===
While foreigners were a majority in 1995, in 2007 most of the population had Belgian citizenship, which has resulted in a sharp increase of municipal councillors with a foreign background, benefitting from the open proportional electoral system: from none in 1988 to two (from Morocco) in 1994, a near majority of 13 (seven from Morocco, five from Turkey) out of 27 in 2000 (including three aldermen) and a majority of 20 out of 27 in 2007 (including six aldermen out of seven, the seventh is a member of the Flemish minority).

Nationalities
Citizenship	1979		1995		2007	
Belgium	12,222	54.5%	9,231	42.1%	14,656	61.6%
Turkey	2,304	10.3%	3,904	18.1%	1,527	6.4%
Morocco	2,664	11.9%	3,761	17.5%	1,482	6.2%
France	―	―	―	―	674	2.8%
Italy	1,661	7.4%	785	3.6%	458	1.9%
Congo (DRC)	198	0.9%	―	―	453	1.9%
Poland	―	―	―	―	432	1.8%
Romania	―	―	―	―	387	1.6%
Spain	840	3.7%	443	2.1%	317	1.3%
Bulgaria	―	―	―	―	251	1.1%
Total pop.	22,409		21,522		23,785	

Based on 2023 figures, Saint-Josse is also the poorest municipality in Belgium by median equivalised disposable income, as well as the one with the highest percentage of population with an income below the national poverty threshold (33%).

== Politics ==
=== Mayors ===
Historical list of mayors or burgomasters of Saint-Josse:

- 1800–1808: André-Etienne-Joseph O'Kelly
- 1808–1813: Jacques-Joseph De Glimes (GLIM)
- 1813: Théodore-Nicolas-Joseph Aerts 1813
- 1813–1823: Jean-François Wauvermans
- 1823–1842: Urbain Henri Verbist
- 1842–1846: Léonard Constant Willems
- 1846–1867: Jacques Joseph Damas Gillon
- 1867–1870: Louis Guillaume Felix Sainctelette
- 1870–1884: Fritz Jottrand
- 1885–1899: Armand Steurs
- 1900–1926: Henri Frick
- 1926–1942: Georges Petre (alderman, then mayor from 1926 until his destitution and assassination by the Rexists in 1942)
- 1944–1947: Joseph Dery
- 1947–1953: André Saint-Remi
- 1953–1999: Guy Cudell
- 1999–2012: Jean Demannez (councillor in 1976, alderman in 1977, mayor in 1999, reelected in 2000 and 2006)
- 2012–present: Emir Kir

== Culture ==
- The Charlier Museum is devoted to Belgian art of the end of the 19th century.
- The Jazz Station is a museum and archive on jazz, and a venue for jazz concerts.
- The Botanical Garden of Brussels, currently serving both as a park and as a venue for events known as Le Botanique.
