= Guy Cudell =

Belgian politician (1917–1999)

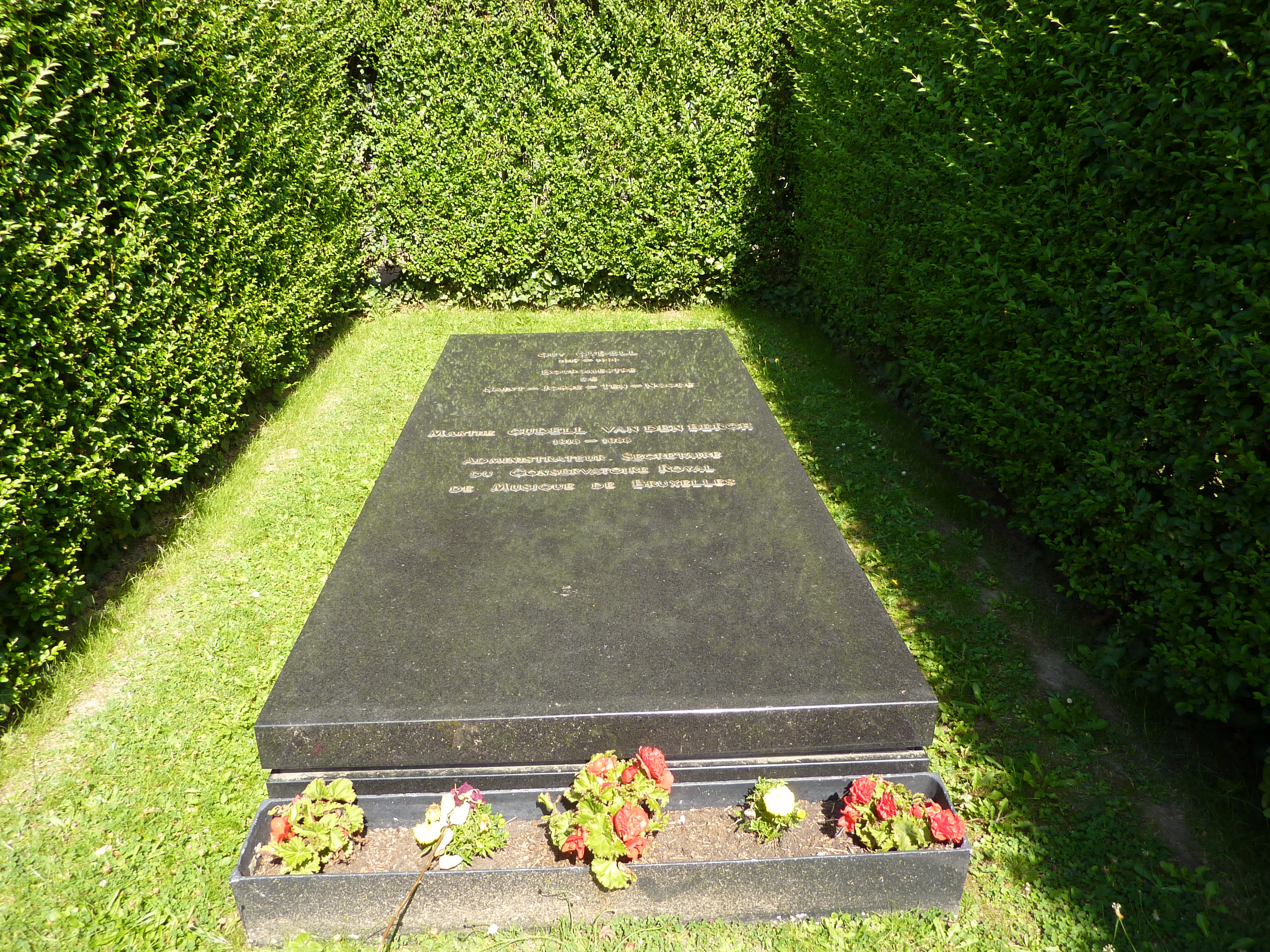
Cudell's grave in Saint-Josse-ten-Noode Cemetery

Guy Cudell (12 February 1917 – 16 May 1999) was a Belgian politician of the Belgian Socialist Party and the French-speaking Socialist Party (PS). He was first voted onto the council in Saint-Josse-ten-Noode in the Brussels Capital Region in 1946 and was mayor from 1953 until his death.

Cudell was born in Woluwe-Saint-Pierre. Following his election to the council, he was put in charge of education, and was an early adopter of mixed-sex education in 1947, and family planning in 1962. He was also a member of the Chamber of Representatives (1954–1977), the Senate of Belgium and was minister for development in the cabinet of prime minister Edmond Leburton from 1973 to 1974.

On 24 June 1984, Cudell was kidnapped in nearby Ixelles by René Busschot. Busschot kept him captive in Tellin, Luxembourg Province. Cudell was able to break out of his handcuffs and escape the empty house through an open door. An envelope left at the house identified Busschot, who handed himself in on 26 June and was sentenced in 1988 to a suspended sentence of three years. Cudell's account of the events has been doubted by some in Belgium, who allege that he had orchestrated the event.

Cudell was the subject of the fly on the wall documentary Le bourgmestre a dit ("The Mayor Said"), filmed in 1996 by Marie-Hélène Massin.

Cudell died of cancer, aged 82.
