= Michalak =

Michalak (Polish pronunciation: [miˈxalak]; plural Michalakowie) is a Polish surname. Notable people with the surname include:

- Andrzej Michalak (born 1959), Polish cyclist
- Aneta Michalak (born 1977), Polish canoer
- Borys Szyc (born 1978 as Borys Michalak), Polish film and theatre actor and musician
- Chris Michalak (born 1971), American baseball player
- Christophe Michalak (born 1973), French Master Pâtissier
- Dariusz Michalak (born 1966), Polish footballer
- Eugeniusz Michalak (1908–1988), Polish cyclist
- Frédéric Michalak (born 1982), French rugby union player
- Jérémy Michalak (born 1980), French television presenter and producer
- Johannes Michalak, German clinical psychologist
- Konrad Michalak (born 1997), Polish professional footballer
- Krzysztof Michalak (born 1987), Polish association football player
- Lechosław Michalak (born 1956), Polish cyclist
- Marek Michalak (born 1971), Polish pedagogue and social activist
- Michael W. Michalak (born 1946), American diplomat
- Stephen Michalak (1916-1999), lone witness of an alleged UFO encounter in Falcon Lake (Manitoba)
- Theresa Michalak (born 1992), German swimmer
- Miroslaw Adam Michalak (born 1962), American systems designer
- Michalak C7
- Piotr Michalak (born 2006), Young Irish Politician

== See also ==
- Michalík
