= Pierre Marcolini =

Belgian chocolatier (born 1964)

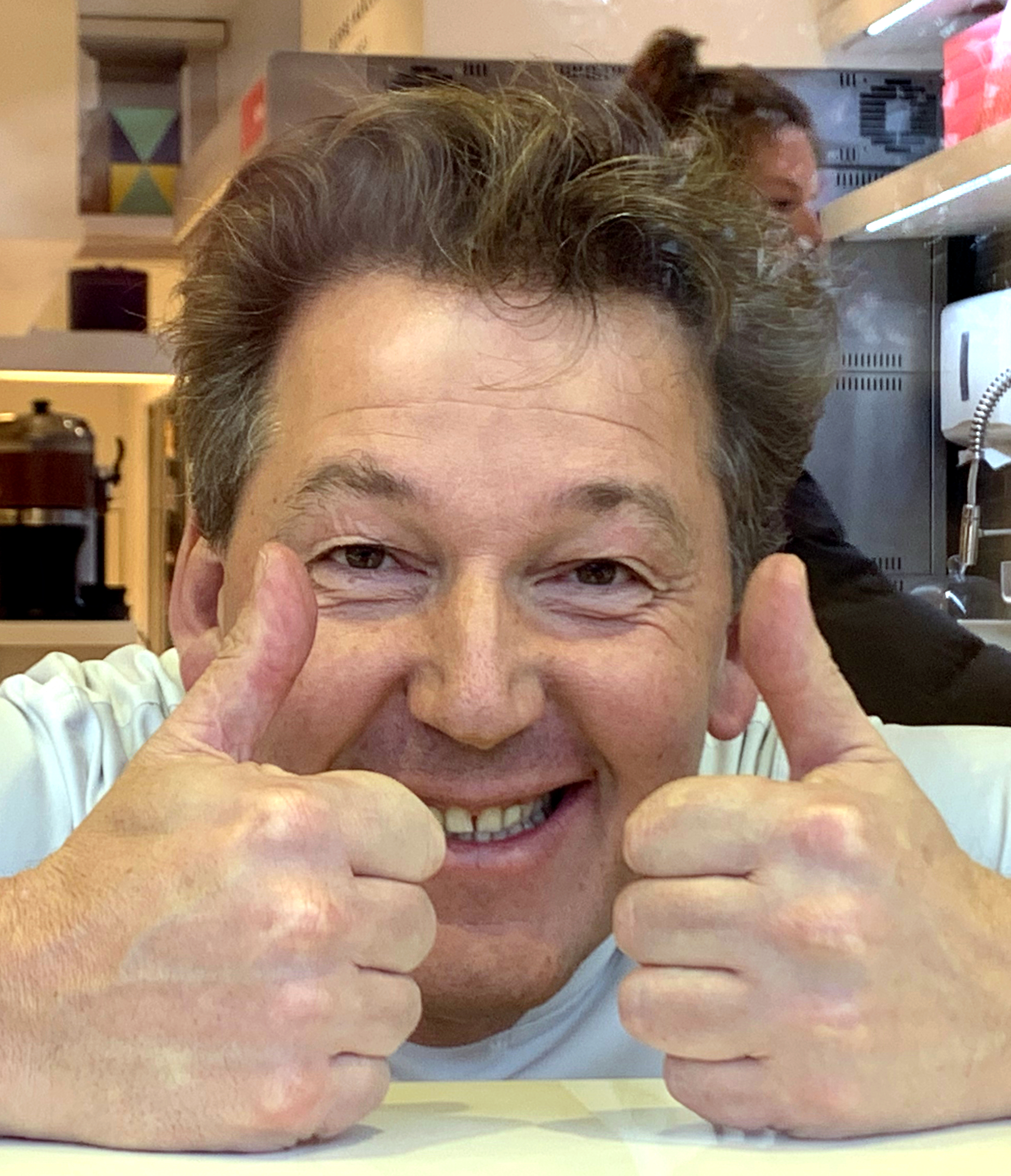
- Pierre Marcolini in 2019
- Born: July 12, 1964 (age 62); Charleroi, Belgium
- Occupation: Chocolatier
- Website: www.marcolini.be

Pierre Marcolini (French: [pjɛʁ maʁ.kɔ.li.ni]; born 12 July 1964) is a Belgian chocolatier born in Charleroi, Belgium, in 1964.

== Biography ==
=== Youth ===
Pierre Marcolini was born in Charleroi, Belgium, on 12 July 1964. His maternal grandparents hail from Verona, Italy.

He studied at the Centre d'enseignement et de recherches des industries alimentaires et chimiques (CERIA) and the Infobo of Uccle.

=== Professional life ===
Having qualified as a chef-pâtissier, he was employed variously in Belgium and France, including employment at such prestigious institutions as Wittamer and Auguste Fauchon.

In 1995, he won the "World Champion Pastry Chef" in Lyon and opened his first shop.

Visiting the chocolaterie of Maurice Bernachon, he was inspired by the artisanal methods of the Lyonese, henceforth considering him one of his mentors, along with the pâtissier Gaston Lenôtre.

In 2007, Nestlé acquired a 6% stake in the business. Marcolini then created a chocolate flavour for Nestle subsidiary Nespresso, whereupon Nestle increased its share to 29%. The partnership ended in December 2011 as Marcolini and other shareholders bought out Nestlé's share. The following year, Marcolini raised additional capital from investment group NEO Capital.

As of 2012, the corporation had 350 employees and as of 2015 holds 30 shops, most notably in London, Tokyo, Paris and Brussels. In 2012, it generates 32 million Euros in revenue.

The corporation has a manufacturing facility in Sablon, one of the most upmarket parts of Brussels. Marcolini controls his production "from bean to bar". He artesanally produces his own couverture chocolate, and selects his suppliers from among plantations in Brazil, Equatorial Guinea and Mexico. In 2012, the company produced 150 tons of chocolate.

Marcolini has collaborated with other creatives such as the stylist Olympia Le-Tan and fashion label Kitsuné.

=== Television ===
As of July 2013, he is a member of the jury of culinary reality TV show Qui sera le prochain grand pâtissier? (Who will be the next great pastrymaker?), broadcast by France 2.

== Books ==
- Éclats, Les Chocolats de L'iris, 2007
- Dix petits doigts pleins de chocolat, Racine, 2010
- Chocolat Café, Éditions Laymon, 2011
- Chocolat Plaisir, Éditions Solar, 2014
- Cacao, de la Fève à la Tablette, Éditions de la Martinière, 2015
- Best Of Pierre Marcolini, Alain Ducasse Éditions, 2015
- Cacao : del haba a la tableta, Librooks, 2016
- Ciocolatthino: From the Cocoa Bean to the Chocolate Bar, Rizzoli International Publications, 2017
- Chocolat - Carnets de Voyages : Un tour du monde en 70 recettes, Éditions de la Martinière, 2017

== Awards ==
Marcolini received the first national prize of artistic merit in 1988. In 1991, he was named "premier pâtissier glacier de Belgique" (best Belgian cake-and-icecream maker). In addition to the Coupe du Monde de la Pâtisserie in 1995, Marcolini won the coupe européenne de pâtisserie in 2000. The tourist office of Brussels has named him "Ambassadeur du Tourisme" (tourism ambassador). In January 2015, Marcolini received the honorary title of "Officier de l'Ordre du Mérite Agricole" (officer of the order of agricultural merit).

== See also ==
- Belgian chocolate
