= Sablon, Brussels =

Neighbourhood in Brussels, Belgium

Sablon: Sablon (French); Zavel (Dutch)
- Neighbourhood
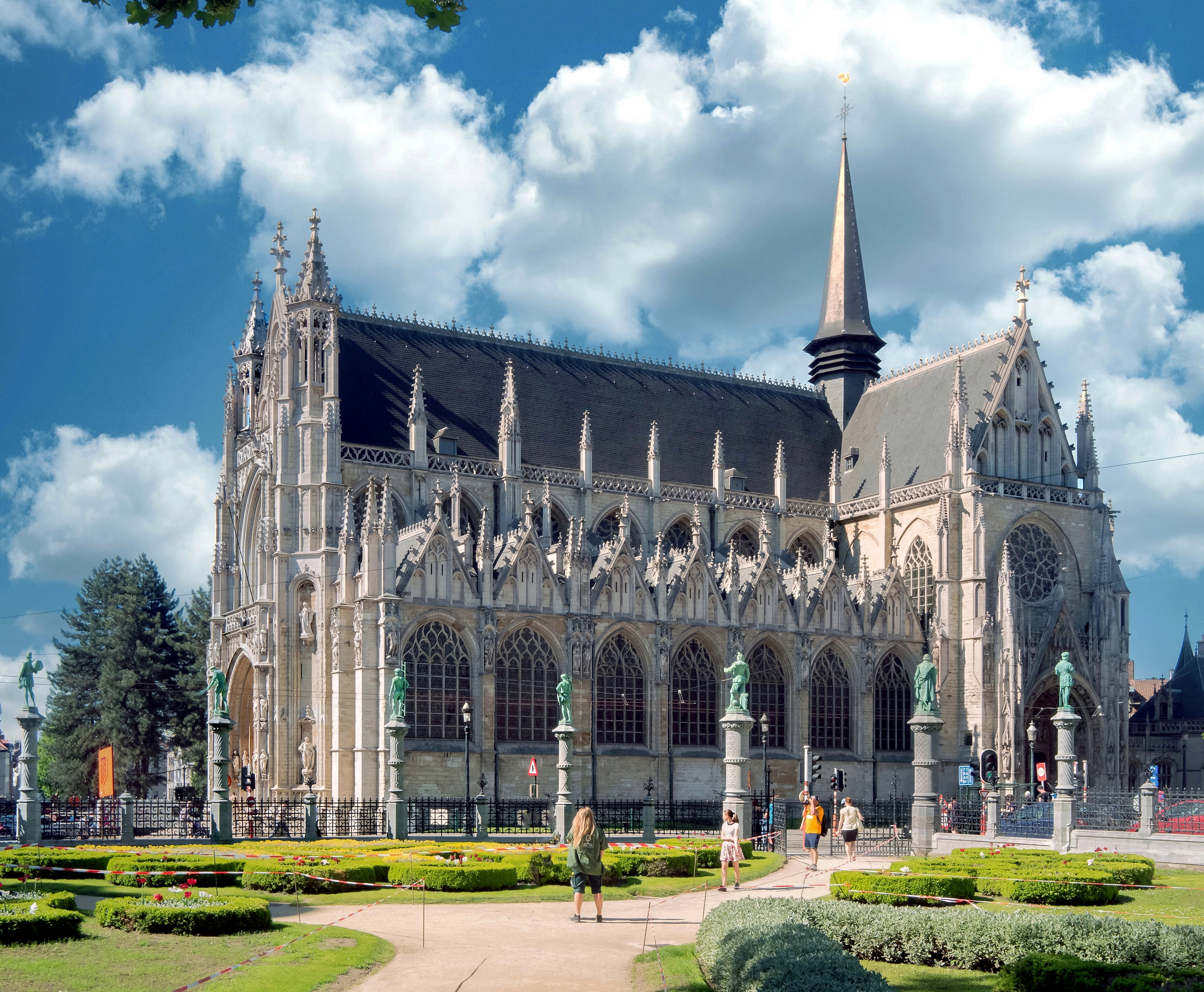
- Church of Our Lady of Victories seen from the Petit Sablon/Kleine Zavel's garden

- Location within Brussels Sablon (Belgium)
- Coordinates: 50°50′24″N 4°21′22″E
- Country: Belgium
- Region: Brussels-Capital Region
- Arrondissement: Brussels-Capital
- Municipality: City of Brussels
- Time zone: UTC+1 (CET)
  - Summer (DST): UTC+2 (CEST)
- Postal code: 1000
- Area codes: 02
- Website: www.sablon-bruxelles.com

The Sablon (French, pronounced [sablɔ̃]) or Zavel (Dutch, pronounced [ˈzaːvəl]) is a neighbourhood and hill in the historic upper town of Brussels, Belgium. At its heart are two adjoining squares: the larger Grand Sablon (French) or Grote Zavel (Dutch; "Large Sablon") square in the north-west and the smaller Petit Sablon (French) or Kleine Zavel (Dutch; "Small Sablon") square and garden in the south-east, divided by the Church of Our Lady of Victories at the Sablon and the Rue de la Régence/Regentschapstraat.

The Sablon is a swanky district, where an antiques market is held, and in which antique and art dealers, as well as other luxury shops, have their businesses. This area is served by Brussels-Chapel railway station and Brussels-Central railway station, as well as the tram stop Petit Sablon/Kleine Zavel (on lines 92 and 93).

== History ==
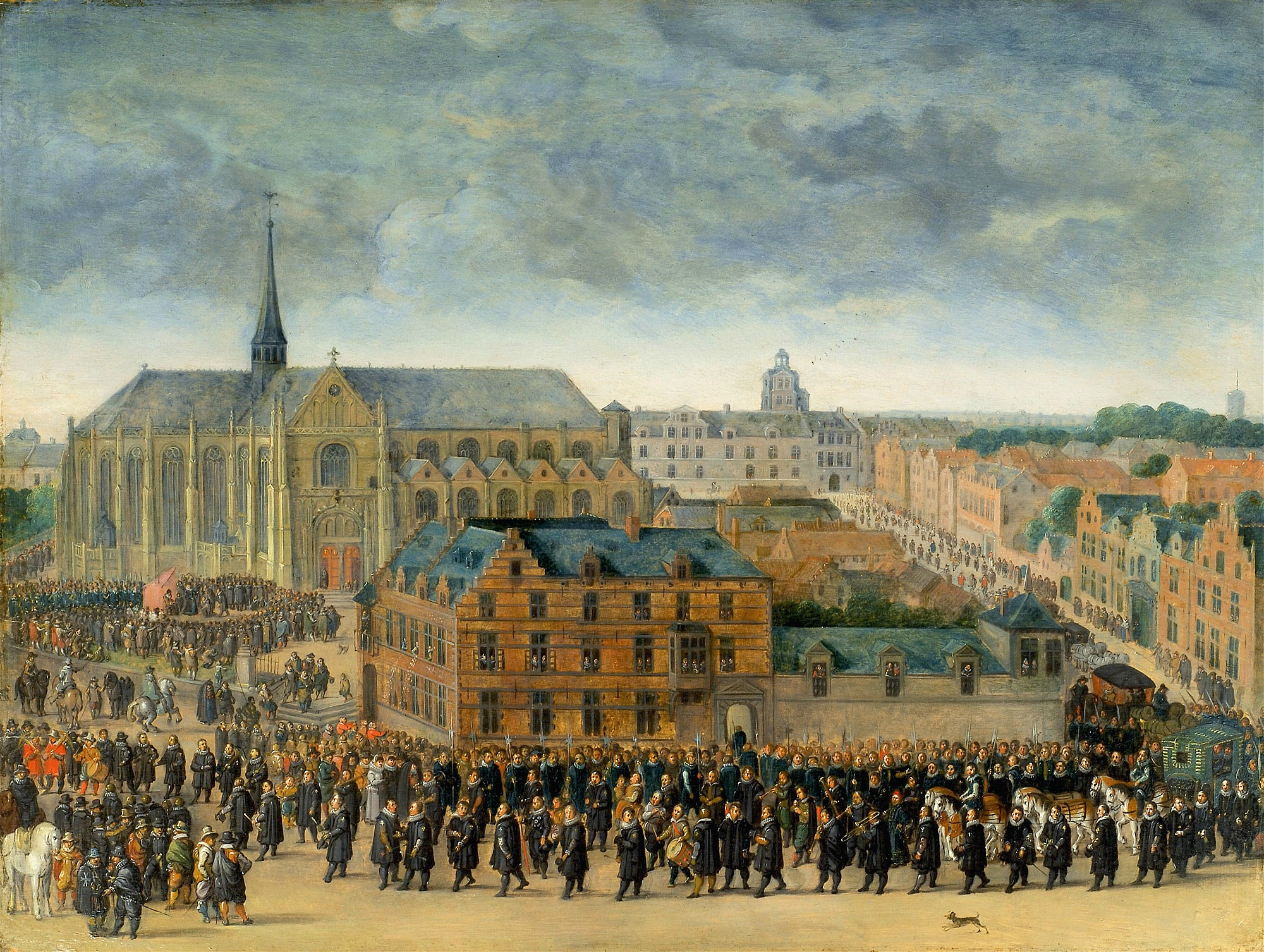
Antoon Sallaert's The Infante Isabella shoots the jay of the Grand Serment [Crossbowmen's Guild] with a crossbow in the Sablon in Brussels depicts an Ommegang in 1615.

=== Early history ===
The Sablon lies near the Mont des Arts/Kunstberg neighbourhood, and lay not far outside the first walls of Brussels. It was originally an unused open space, with areas of wetlands, grassland and sand, where a hermit made his home. The words sablon in French and zavel in Dutch both mean a fine-grained sand, halfway between silt and sand. St. John's Hospital (French: Hôpital Saint-Jean, Dutch: Sint-Jansgasthuis) used the area as a cemetery in the 13th century, having run out of space in its own cemetery.

In 1304, the Guild of the brothers and sisters of St. John's Hospital ceded the land to the Crossbowmen's Guild. They built a modest chapel dedicated to Our Lady on the site, completed in 1318, setting off the transformation of the area. Legend has is that the chapel became famous after a local devout woman named Beatrijs Soetkens had a vision in which the Virgin Mary instructed her to steal the miraculous statue of Onze-Lieve-Vrouw op 't Stocxken ("Our Lady on the Little Stick") in Antwerp, bring it to Brussels, and place it in the chapel of the Crossbowmen's Guild. The woman stole the statue, and through a series of miraculous events, was able to transport it to Brussels by boat in 1348. It was then solemnly placed in the chapel and venerated as the guild's patron. The guild also promised to hold an annual procession, carrying the image throughout Brussels. This developed into the Ommegang, an important religious and civil event in Brussels' calendar, held on the Sunday before Pentecost.

=== 15th to 18th centuries ===
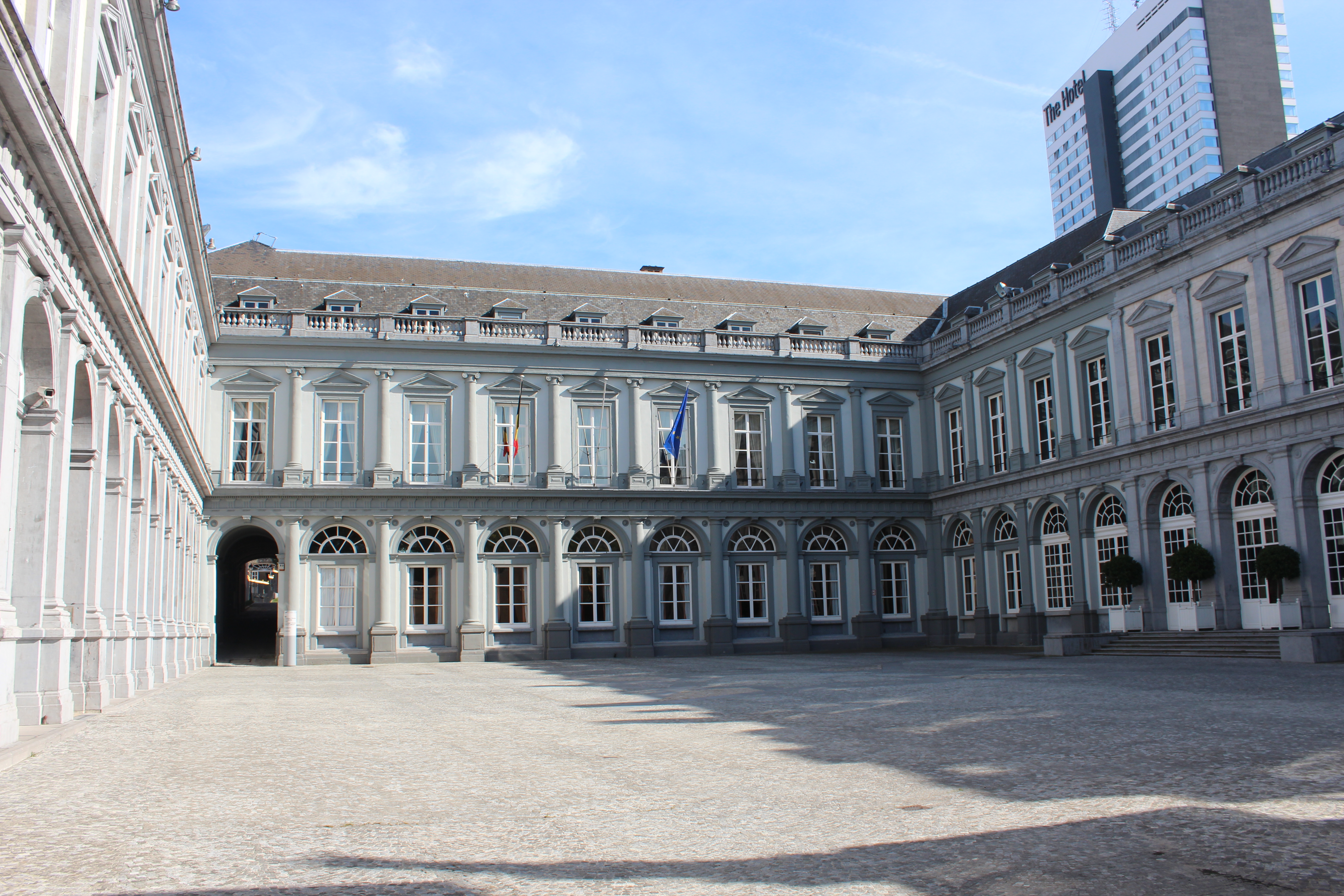
The Egmont Palace, now part of the Belgian Ministry of Foreign Affairs, in the Sablon/Zavel

In the 15th century, the neighbourhood began to enlarge substantially. The chapel was rebuilt as the larger and more elegant Church of Our Lady of Victories at the Sablon, still standing today. In 1470, Duke Charles the Bold charged a body with the creation of a street running from his nearby Coudenberg Palace to the church. The church became the site of the baptisms of princes; Archduchess Mary of Austria's baptismal cortège went to Our Blessed Lady of the Sablon instead of the Church of St. Michael and St. Gudula (now Brussels' cathedral), which had previously held the honour. Governor Margaret of Austria made it the site of her religious devotions as well. In 1530, it saw the greatest July procession in its history. These symbols of royal favour would ensure the lasting prosperity of the Sablon area. The Wolweide ("Wool meadow") area, corresponding loosely to the current Rue aux Laines/Wolstraat, was an extension of the Sablon, stretching to the slopes of the Galgenberg hill (French: Mont aux potences; "Gallows Mount"), where the current Palace of Justice stands.

In the 16th century, Brussels' most prominent noblemen established themselves on the upper Sablon and on the Rue aux Laines. The Egmonts, the Culemborgs, the Brederodes and the Mansfelds were the first, and the De Lannoys, the De Lalaings, the Thurn und Taxis, and the Solres joined them. The result was that, by the 17th century, the Sablon had grown to become the most aristocratic and prosperous neighbourhood in the city. The Egmont Palace on the Petit Sablon still exists, and gives the best indication of what the area was like at the height of its splendour; the grandiose houses of the Lannoys and the Mérode-Westerloo family still stand on the Rue aux Laines. In 1566, the Culemborg Mansion on the Rue des Petits Carmes/Karmelietenstraat was the site of the drafting of the Compromise of Nobles, which ultimately led to the Dutch Revolt. To eliminate any trace of this seditious act against the king, the Duke of Alba razed the mansion to the ground in 1568.

The proximity of the cemetery was already an irritation to its aristocratic neighbours in 1554, but it would be another century and a half before the government of Brussels recognised that the situation had become unbearable. They reported that corpses "were often neglected and left in only half-covered graves, from which dogs had several times pulled parts off and run around in broad daylight with arms and legs in their mouths". It was therefore decided in 1704 to move the cemetery to the Marolles/Marollen district.

=== 19th century to present ===
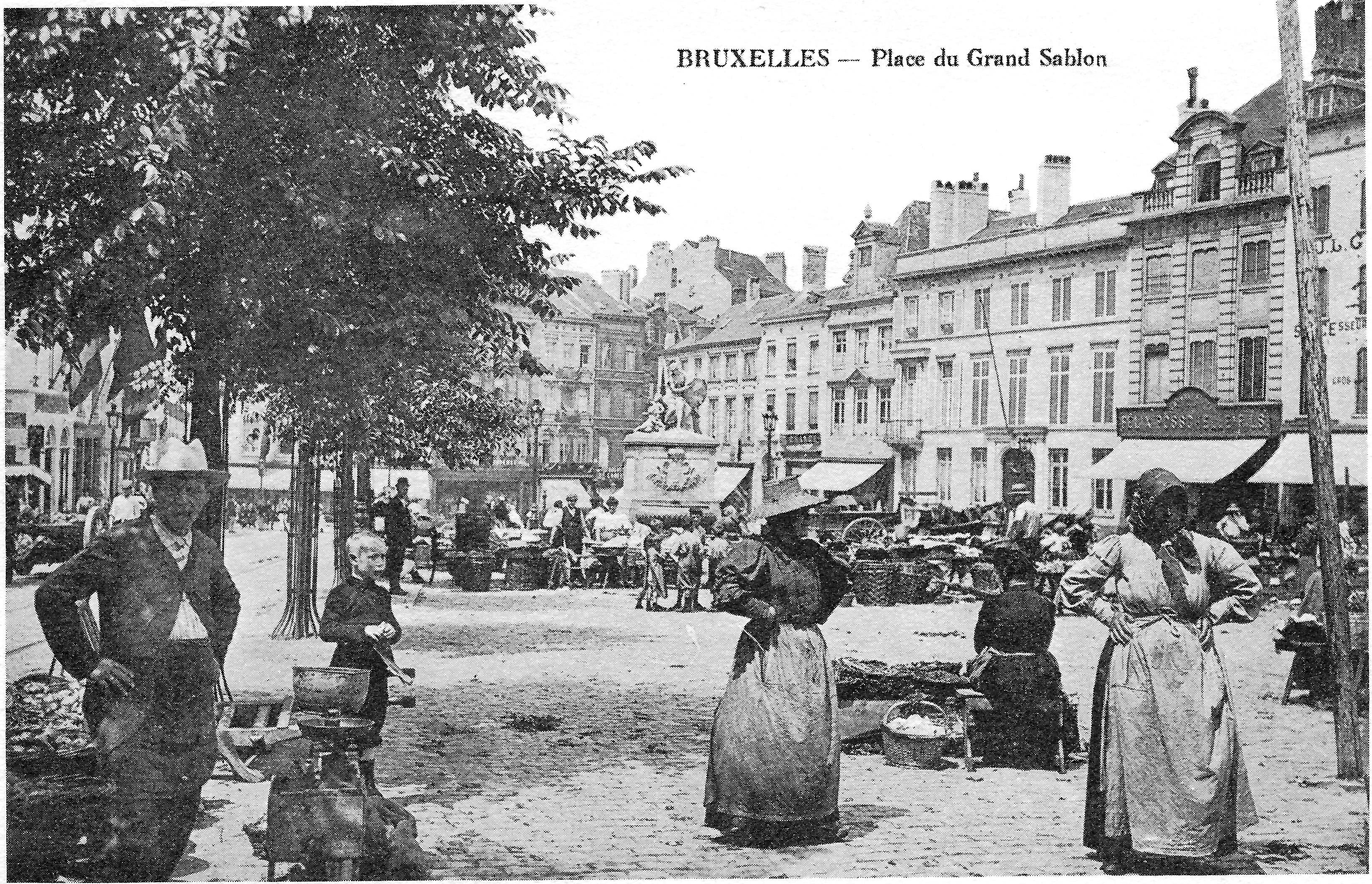
The Square du Grand Sablon/Grote Zavelsquare and its market, c. 1900

The Sablon neighbourhood was remodelled in the 19th century as the Rue de la Régence/Regentschapstraat was driven through the area, creating a Haussmann-esque style artery between the Royal Palace in the Royal Quarter and the new Palace of Justice in the Marolles. The new street skirted the church, and all buildings immediately adjacent to it were demolished starting in 1872, opening up new views of the church. On that occasion, buildings not directly adjacent to the church were renovated and improved.

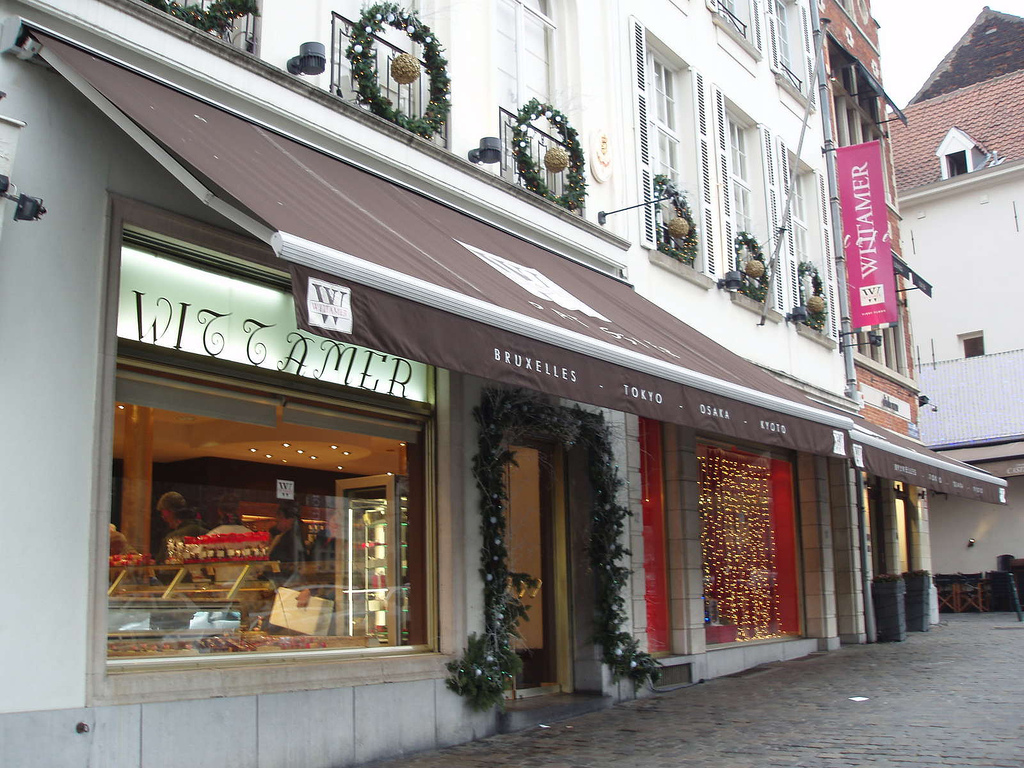
Wittamer & Co chocolatier on the Grand Sablon. After losing its prestige, the area is chic once again.

From the 19th to early 20th centuries, the Grand Sablon became a renowned site for a sport called balle pelote or jeu de balle, a ball game similar to Frisian handball. Though the sport is no longer played much today, it was particularly popular at the time. The Belgian monarchs would frequently be seen among the spectators of a match; Leopold II explained that he would frequently come watch the games, as he lived in the area.

The social composition of the neighbourhood changed over the course of time. In the 19th century, it was incrementally abandoned by the aristocracy in favour of newer, more chic neighbourhoods, such as the Leopold Quarter. In the 20th century, the Square du Grand Sablon/Grote Zavelsquare was occupied by a more modest populace, characterised by small workshops and warehouses. At the end of the 1960s, the neighbourhood's character began to change yet again. Multiple antique stores moved in, following demolitions in the nearby Mont des Arts area. Gradually, the Sablon became a desirable place once again, giving rise to the neologism "sablonisation", a local version of gentrification. Recently, a number of chocolatiers and confectioners have come to the area, which is once again the heart of the Brussels upper class.

== Grand Sablon ==
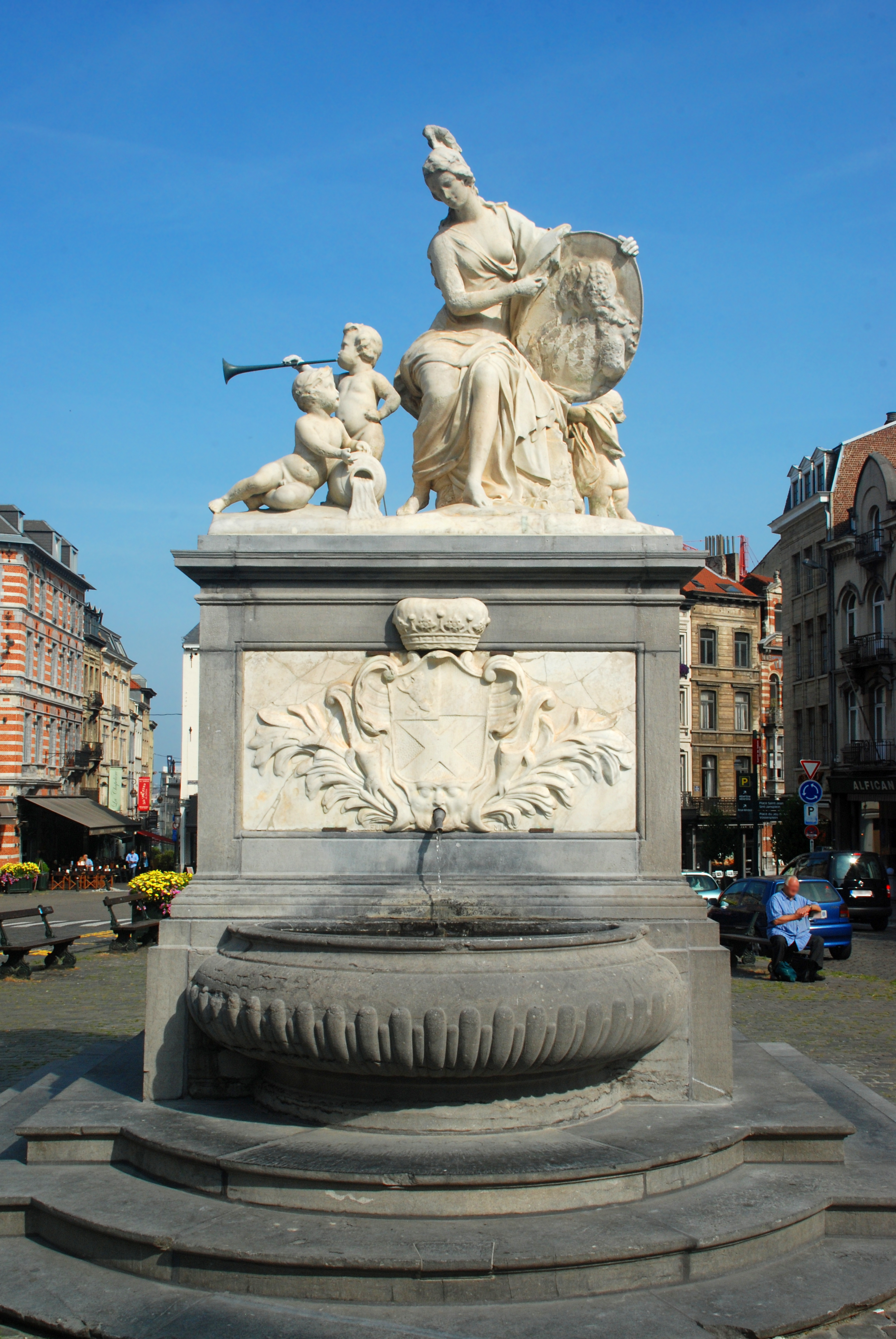
Fountain of Minerva on the Square du Grand Sablon

=== History ===
The Square du Grand Sablon/Grote Zavelsquare lies to the north-west of the church. It is in the shape of a long triangle, around 50 m (160 ft) wide in the south-east, terminating in a point around 130 m (430 ft) to the north-west. When Brussels' residents mention the "Sablon" without qualification, they are usually referring to the Grand Sablon. The Grand Sablon was linked to the Petit Sablon by the Rue Bodenbroek/Bodenbroekstraat and the Rue des Sablons/Zavelstraat, though the division between the two Sablons was accentuated by the Rue de la Régence/Regentschapstraat cutting through the area.

In the 16th century, the Grand Sablon was known as the Peerdemerct (Middle Dutch for "Horse market", Latin: Forum Equorum), due to the horse market that was held there from 1320 to 1754. The place was also known as the Zavelpoel ("Sandy pond") due to a pond in the centre, which would last until 1615. After the pond was filled in, a fountain was erected in its place in 1661. Water was brought to the fountain by a new conduit from Obbrussel (now Saint-Gilles). This fountain was replaced in 1751 by the present Fountain of Minerva, which was a posthumous gift from the exiled British nobleman Thomas Bruce, 2nd Earl of Ailesbury, who wished to thank the people of Brussels for their hospitality. The fountain was renovated in 1999.

The Grand Sablon was often the stage for festivals and competitions, but also for tragic events. On 1 June 1568, it was the site of a mass execution, as 18 signatories of the Compromise of Nobles were decapitated.

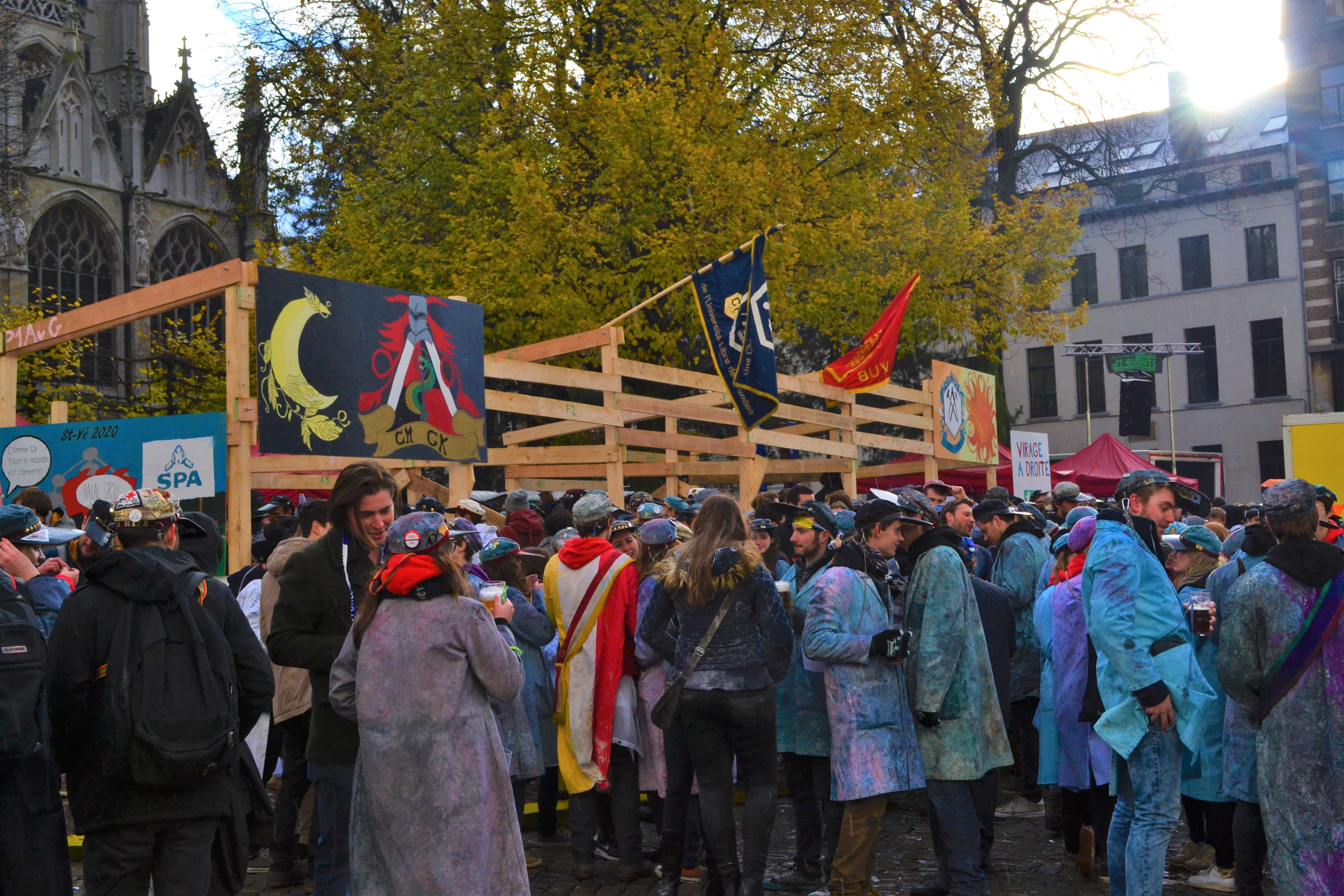
Saint Verhaegen festivities start at the Grand Sablon.

=== Present day ===
The Grand Sablon is now a neighbourhood with residents and small businesses, a popular place to stroll, and a tourist attraction. Surrounding the square are numerous antique stores, boutiques, hotels, restaurants, and an auction house, as well as numerous pastry shops and well-known Belgian chocolatiers, including Neuhaus, Pierre Marcolini and Godiva. On Saturdays and Sundays, the Grand Sablon hosts the Sablon Antiques and Books Market.

As is the case with many other public squares in Brussels, the Grand Sablon has been partially transformed into a car park. As of 2025, a plan to refurbish the space is being investigated.

Each year, the Sablon is the starting point for the Ommegang procession. On 20 November, it hosts the beginning of the Saint Verhaegen student parade (often shortened to St V), which celebrates the founding of the Université libre de Bruxelles (ULB) and the Vrije Universiteit Brussel (VUB).

== Petit Sablon ==
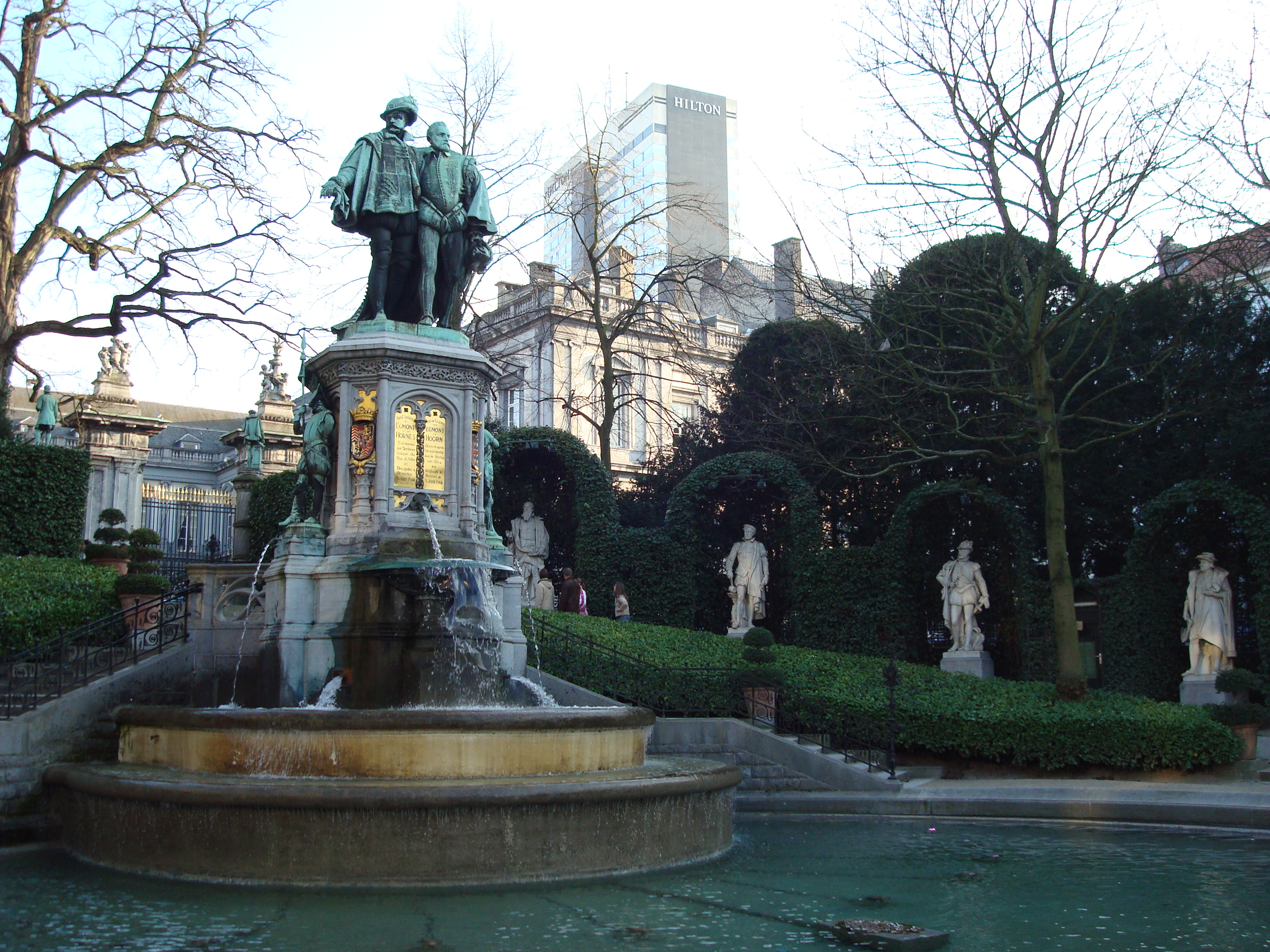
Fountain of the Counts of Egmont and Horn in the Petit Sablon's garden

To the south-east of the church, and slightly uphill, lies the Square du Petit Sablon/Kleine Zavelsquare. It is a roughly rectangular garden, featuring trees, hedges, flowers and most notably, statues.

In the Middle Ages, the Zavelbeek ("Sablon Brook") had its source in the Petit Sablon. It flowed in nearly a straight line into the Senne river, joining it roughly at the current Place Fontainas/Fontainasplein. Its course is still followed by the streets in the area to this day. The Petit Sablon was the site of St. John Hospital's cemetery, mentioned above, until it was moved.

The present-day garden was created by the architect Henri Beyaert, and was inaugurated in 1890. It is surrounded by an ornate wrought iron fence inspired by one that once decorated the Coudenberg Palace. The fence is punctuated by tall stone pillars; atop each pillar is a statue of one or more historical professions, with 48 statues in total. To ensure that the statues were stylistically coherent, Beyaert asked the painter Xavier Mellery to design all of them, though they were executed by different sculptors. Each pillar has a unique design, as does each section of fence.

In the centre of the garden stands a fountain-sculpture by Charles-Auguste Fraikin of the Counts of Egmont and Horn, who were symbols of resistance against the Spanish tyranny that sparked the Dutch Revolt. This monument was initially in front of the King's House on the Grand-Place/Grote Markt (Brussels' main square), the site of their execution. It is surrounded by a semicircle of ten statues of 16th-century political figures, intellectuals and artists.

Petit Sablon's sculptures

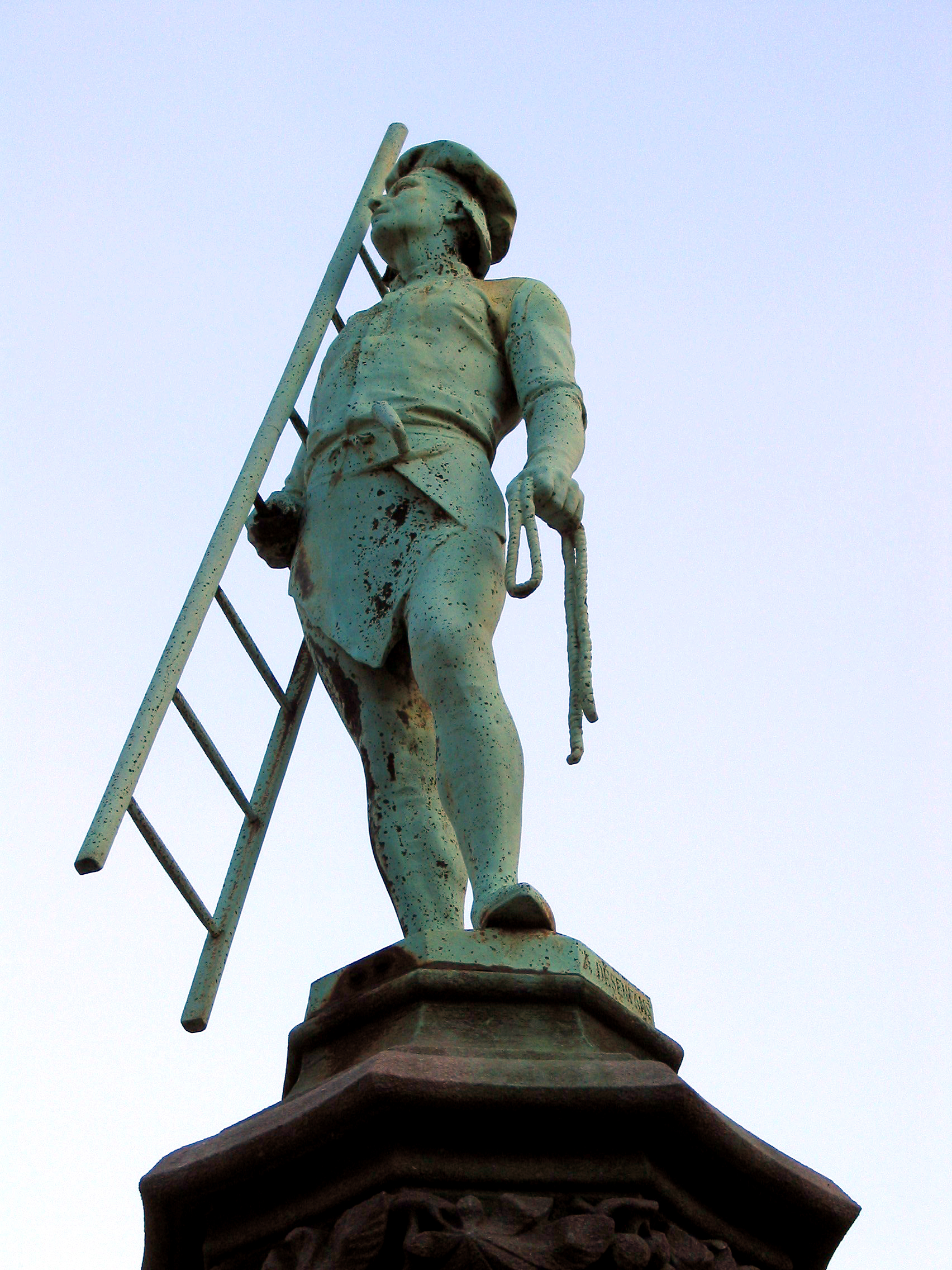
The Slater by Albert Desenfans

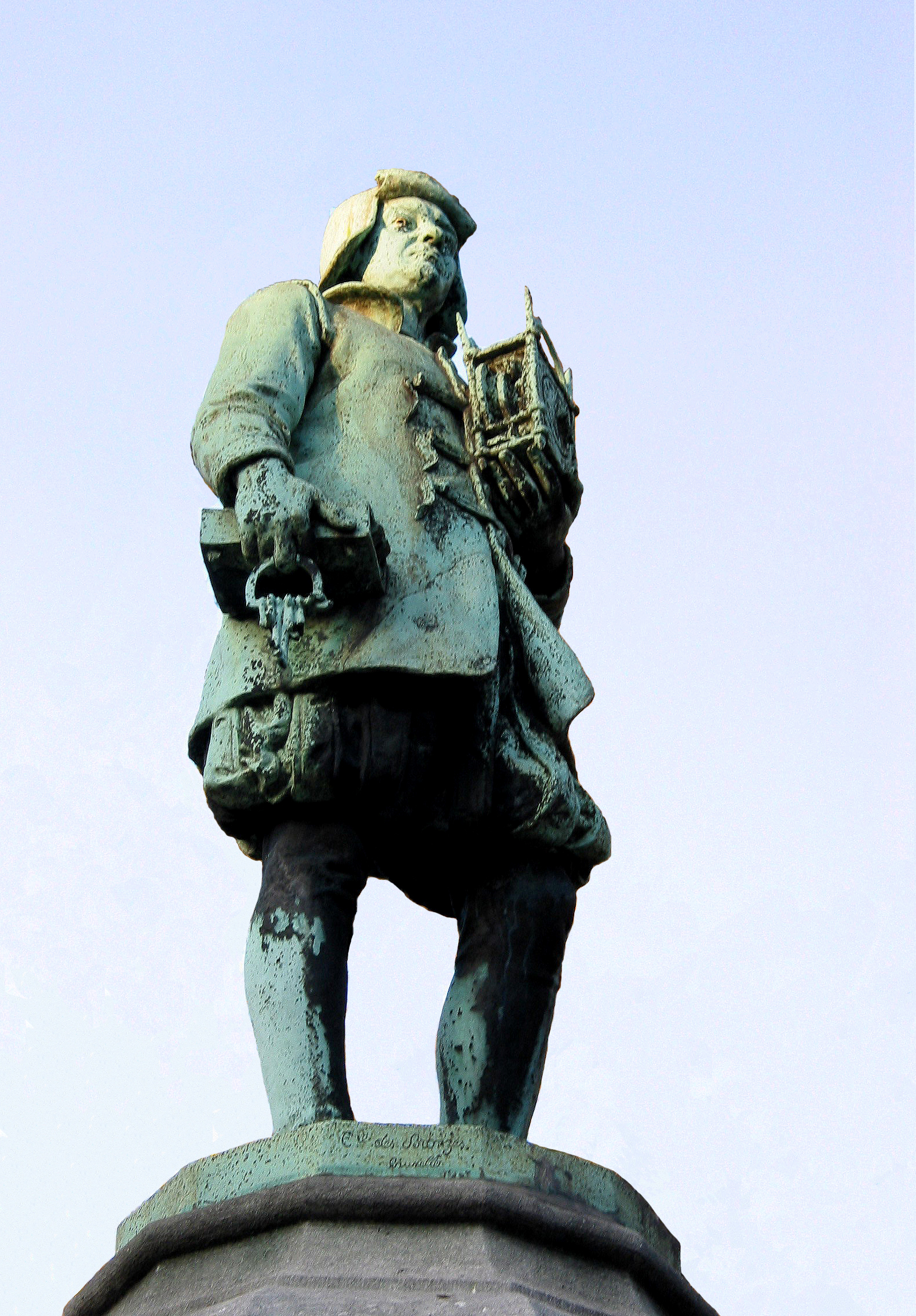
The Clockmaker by Jean Cuypers

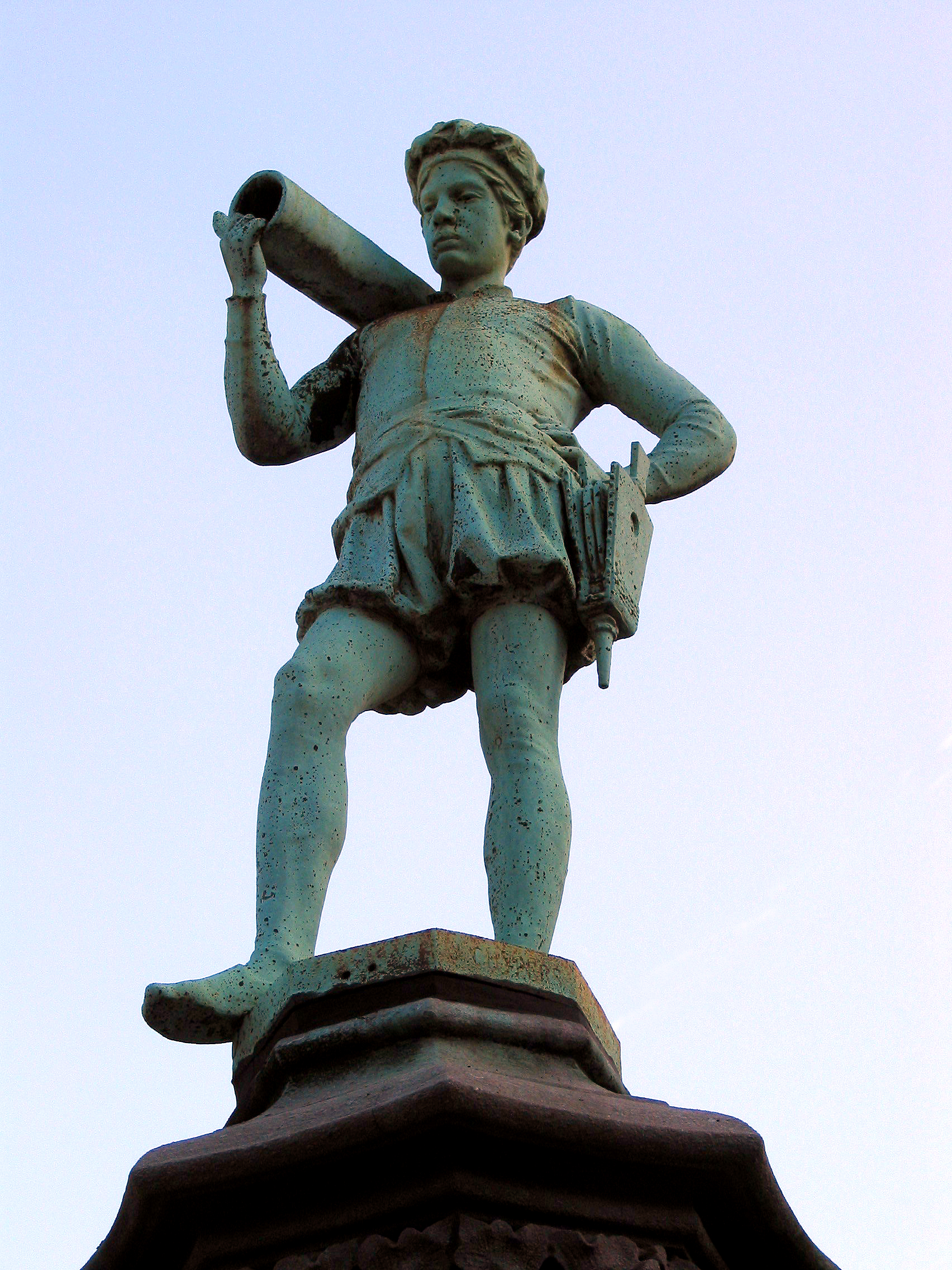
The Plumber by Cuypers

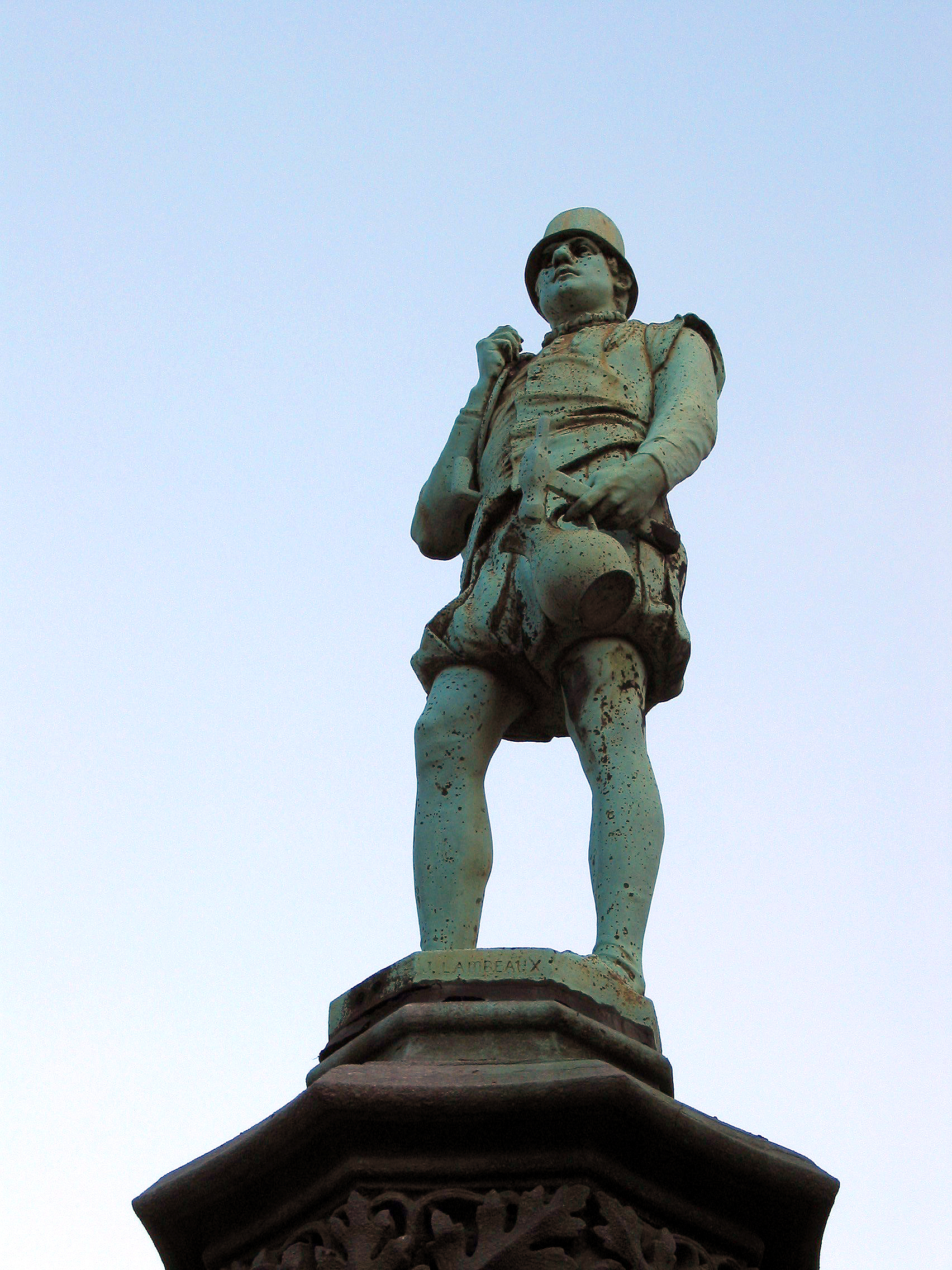
The Boilermaker by Jef Lambeaux

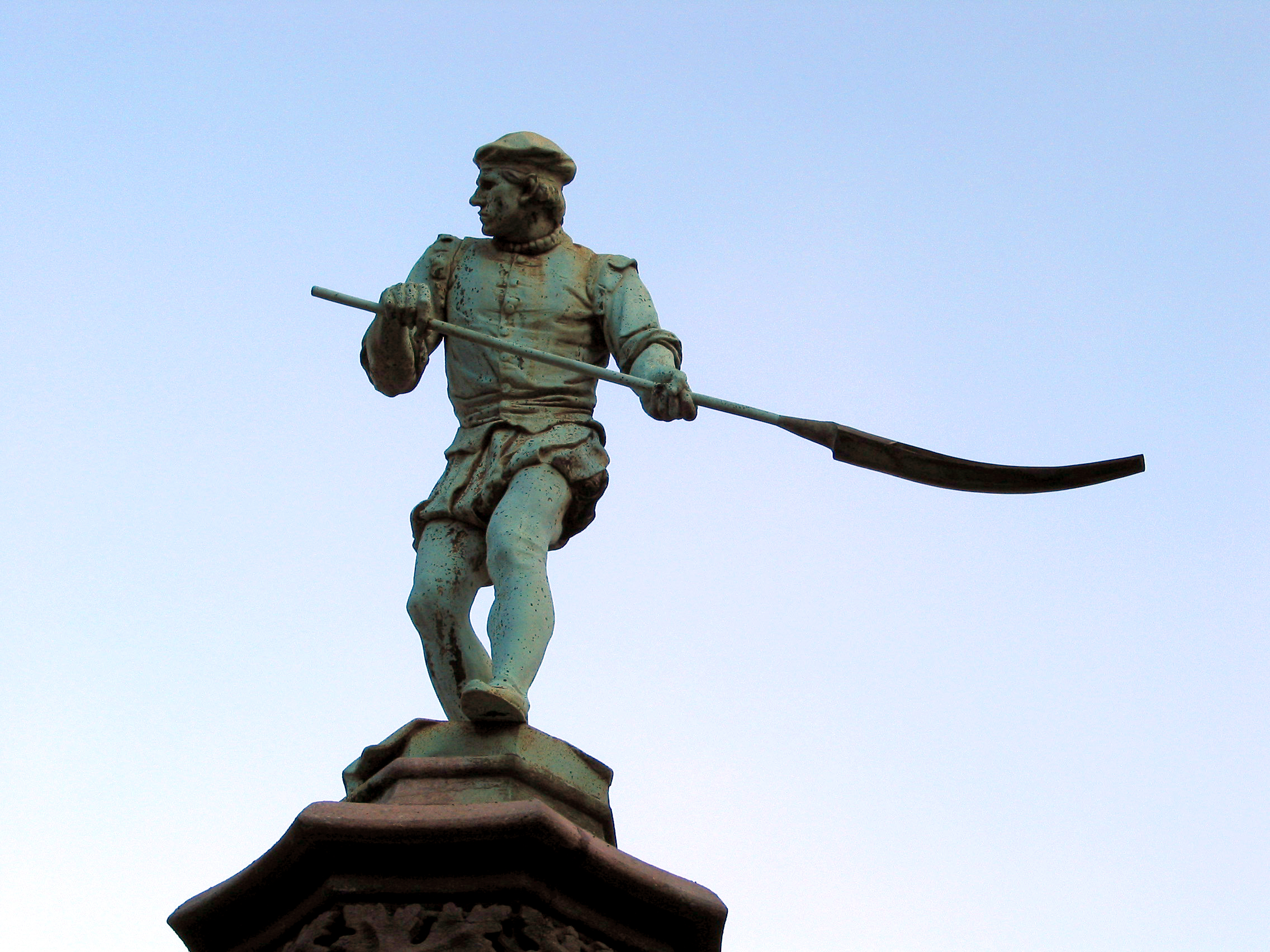
The Bleacher (Launderer) by Lambeaux

== See also ==
- Neighbourhoods in Brussels
- Neoclassical architecture in Belgium
- History of Brussels
- Culture of Belgium
- Belgium in the long nineteenth century
