= Asian Pastry Cup =

The Asian Pastry Cup (APC) is an international pastry competition taking place every two years in Singapore. It is the official selective platform for the Asian teams who will go and compete at the World Pastry Cup in Lyon, France.

== Competition ==
Founded in 2006 in partnership with UBM Singapore, Valrhona, and the support of Singapore Pastry Alliance, the Asian Pastry Cup has reached high awareness and has portrayed itself as a large Asian Live Pastry competition for pastry professionals. This live competition pits national teams of pastry chefs against one another, culminating in a display of chocolate and sugar showpieces as well as pastry creations (examples include plated desserts and chocolate cakes).

It is held in Singapore every two years in conjunction with FHA “Food & Hotel Asia”, a renowned trade show within the food and hospitality industry in Asia, gathering about 4,000 international exhibitors and 78,000 trade attendees coming from 100 countries.

The Asian Pastry Cup goals are:

- Igniting creativity and interest in this culinary art
- Raising the Pastry Industry status in the region
- Providing a communication and education platform among pastry enthusiasts in Asia
- Promoting the best Asian Pastry Chefs of the year from all over Asia

Each team is composed of two competitors and one coach. The coach will form the jury and will taste the creations of other teams.

The competitors will have eight hours to prepare :

- Three chocolate cakes made out of Valrhona chocolates for eight persons
- 18 plated desserts of same composition made with Ravifruit products
- One sugar showpiece
- One chocolate showpiece

== Results ==
	Gold	Silver	Bronze
2006	Singapore : Yoong Ming Choong, Sia Yii Sing, Cassian Tan	Malaysia : Jean-Francois Arnaud, Ho Weng Kit, Amanda Lim	Macao (Macau) : Henry Maillet, Chan Hoi Peng, Qin Tao
2008	Singapore : Ng Chee Leong, Hoi Kuok, Pang Kok Keaong	Taiwan : Li Chou-His, Wu Chau-Fu, Huang Fu-Shou	China : Jiang Peng, Qi Yan, Zhao Bin
2010	Singapore : Pang Kok Keong, Jaycent Lau Tse Kwang, Alex Chong Chi Hung	Taiwan : Fu-Shou Huang, Li-Che Chen, Hsui-Ming	Malaysia : Chern Chee Hoong, Patrick Siau Chi Yin, Lu Yee Ling
2012	Australia : Dean Gibson, Andre Sandison, Justin Yu	Malaysia : Chiam Ko Seen, Kong Yik Hong, Tay Chee Siang	Singapore : Yong Ming Choong, Chong Chi Hiung, Chew Teck Heng Richard
2014	Malaysia : Chiam Ko Seen, Tay Chee Siang, Tan Wei Loon	Singapore : Yong Ming Choong, Kent Ng, Desmond Lee	Australia : Dean Gibson, Richard Hawke, Ryan Stevenson
2016	Singapore : Alex Yen, Pang Yun Kian, Desmond Lee	Malaysia : Tan Wei Loon, Lim Chin Kheng, Yap Kean Chaun	India : Dinesh Rawat, Mukesh Rawat, Amit Sinha
2018	Malaysia : Patrick Siau Chi Yin, Wei Loon Tan, Otto Tay	Singapore : Kent Ng, Ben Goh, Chong Koo Jee	Australia : Yves Scherrer, Sonia Siu, Justin Williams

== Medal count ==
Rank	Nation	Gold	Silver	Bronze	Total
1	Singapore (SIN)	4	2	1	7
2	Malaysia (MAS)	2	3	1	6
3	Australia (AUS)	1	0	2	3
4	Chinese Taipei (TPE)	0	2	0	2
5	China (CHN)	0	0	1	1
5	India (IND)	0	0	1	1
5	Macau (MAC)	0	0	1	1
Totals (7 entries)		7	7	7	21
