= 2015 World Pastry Cup =

International pastry contest

- Native name: Coupe du Monde de la Pâtisserie 2015
- Date: 25-26 January 2015
- Location: Lyon, France
- Participants: 21 teams (representing 21 nations)
- Awards: (gold) Italy; (silver) Japan; (bronze) United States
- Website: www.cmpatisserie.com

The 2015 World Pastry Cup (French:Coupe du Monde de la Pâtisserie 2015) is an international pastry contest which took place in 25–26 January 2015 in Lyon, France.

== Competition ==
For 10 straight hours each participating team composed of three candidates were tasked to complete 21 culinary items; 3 chocolate desserts, 3 frozen fruit desserts, 12 identical desserts on a plate, and 3 artistic creations with each made from three different materials - sugar, chocolate and sculpted hydric ice. The three candidates from each team specializes either on pastries, chocolate and in ice cream. The 2015 edition was the first time that the candidates were tasked to make a sculpture out of a whole block of Valrhona chocolate to be included in their artistic creation made of chocolate. The candidates used two identically sized blocked ice for their ice sculpture. For their sculpture made of sugar, the sculpture was required to make of at least 50 percent drawn sugar and blown sugar. A new pointing system was also utilized for the 2015 edition.

The 21 entries will be judged based on taste, artistic presentation and coherence with the theme.

== Participants ==
21 teams from 21 nations qualified to participate at the 2015 World Pastry Cup. Algeria, Philippines and Guatemala made their debut at the 2015 edition of the tournament. France, the 2013 champions and host of the World Pastry Cup, did not participate at the tournament.

Participating Nations
- Algeria
- Argentina
- China
- Colombia
- Denmark
- Egypt
- Guatemala
- Italy
- Japan
- Malaysia
- Mexico
- Morocco
- Philippines
- Singapore
- South Korea
- Sweden
- Switzerland
- Taiwan
- Tunisia
- United Kingdom
- United States

== Final rankings ==
Rank	Team	Score
1	Italy	8.197
2	Japan	7.402
3	United States	7.139
4	Malaysia	6.967
5	Denmark	6.893
6	United Kingdom	6.769
7	Sweden	6.743
8	Singapore	6.621
9	South Korea	6.595
10	Chinese Taipei	6.499
11	Switzerland	6.387
12	Philippines	6.025
13	Argentina	5.932
14	Mexico	5.888
15	Colombia	5.540
16	Morocco	5.522
17	China	5.437
18	Tunisia	5.347
19	Guatemala	5.306
20	Algeria	4.983
21	Egypt	4.911

== Awards ==
=== Overall ===
Gold Italy	Silver Japan	Bronze United States
Emmanuele Forcone; Francesco Boccia; Fabrizio Donatone	Kazuhiro Nakayama; Junji Tokunaga; Shinichi Sugita	John Kraus; Joshua Johnson; Scott Green

=== Special Prizes ===
Special Prizes were also awarded. The Philippines which participated for the first time won the special prize for Sculpted Ice. Guatemala were conferred with the Team Spirit award due to the team member's solidarity and close working. Italy was awarded the Best Innovative Spirit for the team's usage of icing for its entries. Japan was awarded the special prize, Press for its chocolate desserts. Social media users choose the winners of the Best Promotional Poster, which was awarded to Morocco.

Sculpted Ice Philippines	Chocolate Malaysia	Sugar Denmark	Team Spirit Guatemala	Best Promotional Campaign Switzerland	Best Innovative Spirit Italy	Press Japan	Best Promotional Poster Morocco
Rizalino Mañas; Bryan Dimayuga; Vicente Cahatol	Tay Chee Siang; Tan Wei Loon; Cheong Jun Bo	Mads Kilstrup Kristiansen; Helene Overgaard Jensen; Mike Con Druschke Adelsten	Henry Tambriz; Claudia Ramírez Zea; Luis López	Giuseppe Piffaretti; Tiziano Bonacina; Riccardo Magni	Emmanuele Forcone; Francesco Boccia; Fabrizio Donatone	Kazuhiro Nakayama; Junji Tokunaga; Shinichi Sugita	Taoufik Marouane; Aimane Choukri; Younes Zarouli
Rizalino Mañas; Bryan Dimayuga; Vicente Cahatol	Tay Chee Siang; Tan Wei Loon; Cheong Jun Bo	Mads Kilstrup Kristiansen; Helene Overgaard Jensen; Mike Con Druschke Adelsten	Henry Tambriz; Claudia Ramírez Zea; Luis López	Promotional Managers: Stefania Villa; Valentina Merra	Emmanuele Forcone; Francesco Boccia; Fabrizio Donatone	Kazuhiro Nakayama; Junji Tokunaga; Shinichi Sugita	Taoufik Marouane; Aimane Choukri; Younes Zarouli
