= Maurice Bernachon =

French chocolatier

- Born: July 1919; Saint-André-le-Gaz, France
- Died: 18 September 1999 (aged 80); Lyon, France
- Occupation: Chocolatier

Maurice Bernachon (July 1919, Saint-André-le-Gaz – 18 September 1999, Lyon) was a master chocolatier and founder of the Bernachon family business.

== Biography ==
The son of a signalman, Bernachon started an apprenticeship as pâtissier in Pont-de-Beauvoisin at 12 years of age. In 1975 he created the Président, a cake creation to celebrate the admission to the French League of Honor of Paul Bocuse by then-president of France Valéry Giscard d'Estaing – a cake that made him famous.

He was one of the few French chocolatiers who would entirely manufacture their own chocolate from raw cocoa, imported variously from Venezuela, Colombia, Brazil and Equatorial Guinea.

He retired in 1997, leaving the management of his chocolate business to his son Jean-Jacques (1944–2010), husband to Françoise, the daughter of Paul Bocuse.

The business is currently run by Philippe and Stéphanie Bernachon, the children of Françoise and Jean-Jacques.

== Bibliography ==
- Bernachon, Maurice & Bernachon, Jean-Jacques (1985) La passion du chocolat. Flammarion. 117 pages. Google books identifier e9z2AAAACAAJ. Accessed on 10 August 2014.
- Deligeorges, Stéphane (2009) Le chocolat selon Bernachon. Glénat. 246 pages. Google books identifier tniQgAACAAJ. ISBN 9782723464673. Accessed on 10 August 2014.
