= Wittamer & Co =

Belgian chocolate company

- Industry: chocolatier
- Founded: 1910; 116 years ago in Brussels, Belgium
- Founder: Henri Wittamer
- Products: chocolates and Belgian pralines
- Website: www.wittamer.com

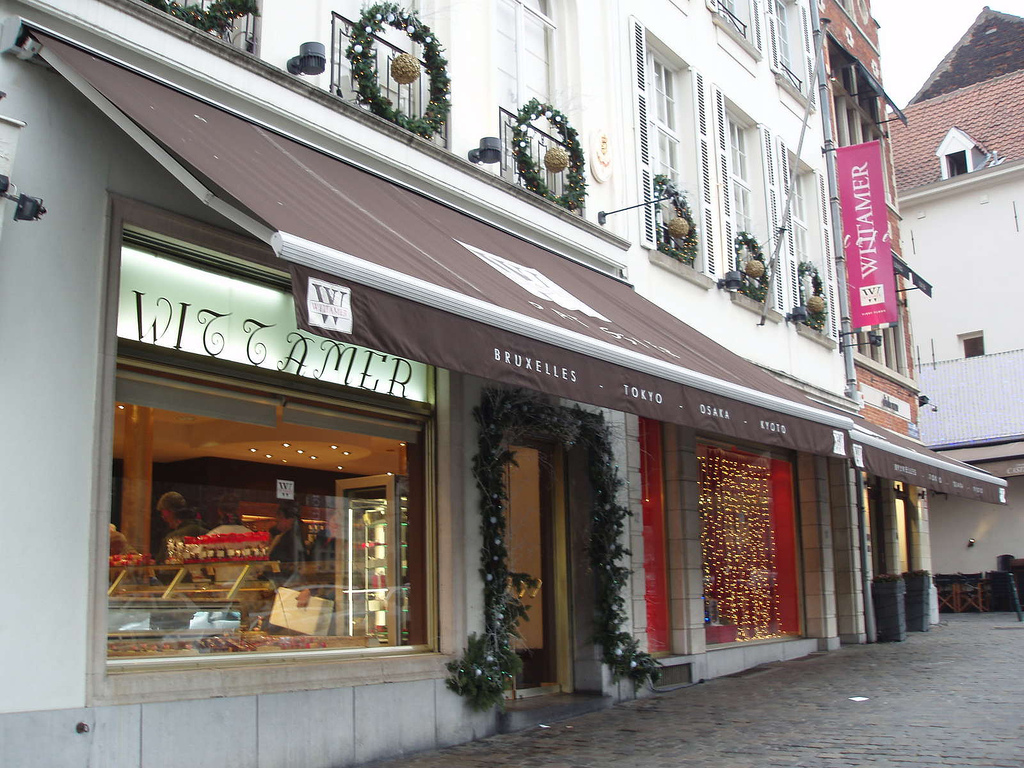
Wittamer & Co shop on the 12 Place du Grand Sablon in Brussels

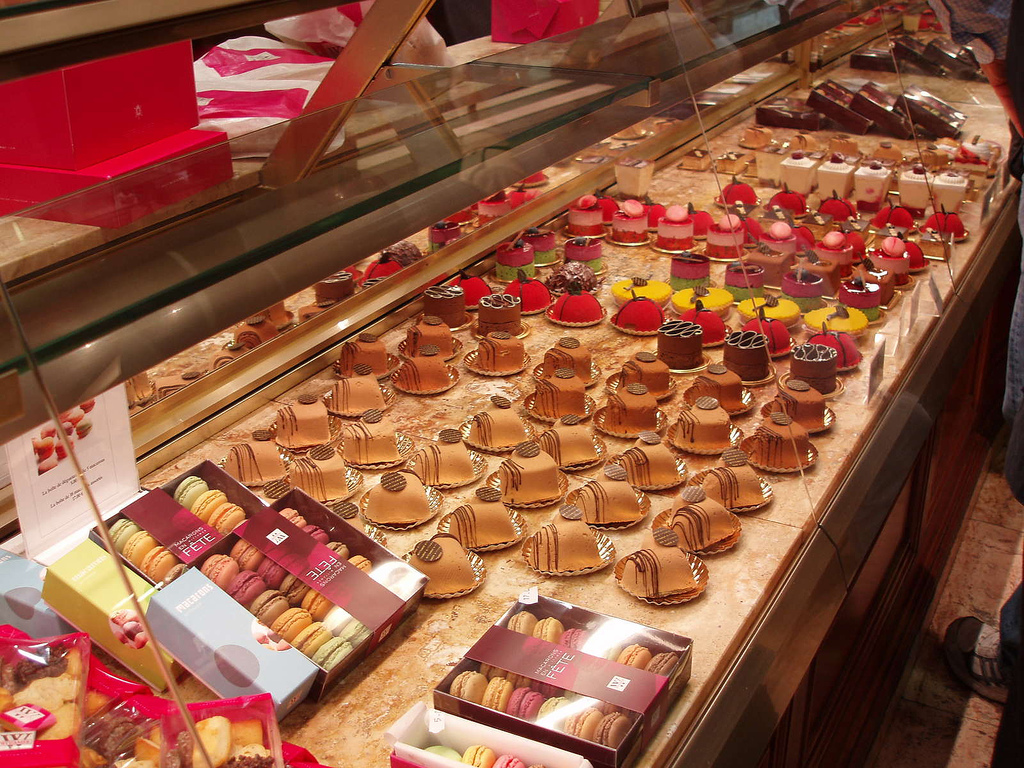
Chocolates by Wittamer

Wittamer & Co is a notable chocolatier based in Brussels, Belgium.

== History ==
Wittamer & Co dates back to 1910 (116 years ago), when Henri Wittamer opened his boulangerie with his wife Marie on the Place du Grand Sablon. The shop passed on to his son Henri II and his wife Yvonne. In the 1960s, his son, Henri III, and his sister Myriam took over the shop. Henri III had his training as maître chocolatier in Switzerland. The process of manufacturing modernised with new technological developments. In the 1980s, new ideas were introduced. The company expanded and opened its first shop in Kobe, Japan in the 1980s. The company is now run in the fourth generation of the family.

For the wedding of Lady Mathilde d'Udekem d'Acoz to Philippe, Crown Prince of Belgium in December 1999, Wittamer received the honour to create the dessert. The king himself chose the type of cake. Because of the excellence of the product, Wittamer subsequently received a royal warrant of appointment to the Belgian court.

It has been a supplier to the Royal Court since 2000. The shop was fully refurbished in 2022.

The original Wittamer café is still located on 6 Place du Grand Sablon. A larger shop on 12 was opened down the same row which offers a wider choice and variety of chocolates and Belgian pralines.

== See also ==
- Neuhaus (chocolatier)
- Belgian chocolate
