= World Pastry Cup =

International pastry contest

World Pastry Cup Coupe du Monde de la Pâtisserie
- Status: Active
- Genre: Competition
- Frequency: Bi-annually
- Location: Lyon, France
- Country: France
- Years active: 37
- Inaugurated: 1989
- Previous event: 2025
- Next event: 2027
- Website: www.cmpatisserie.com

The World Pastry Cup (French:Coupe du Monde de la Pâtisserie) is an international pastry competition taking place every two years in Lyon, France.

Qualification for the Cup is via national competitions, such as the Campionato Italiano di Pasticceria Seniores, where the winners are chosen to take part in the World Pastry Cup.

== Results ==
Year	Gold	Silver	Bronze
1989	(France) : Mickaël Azouz, Thierry Froissard and Serge Billet	(Netherlands) : Emol Trumpie, P. Galerne and J. Le Blanc	(Austria) : Fritz Mayer, Gotthard Valier and Alphonse Watcher
1991	(Japan) : Hidemi Sugino, Akira Ando and Masahiko Hayashi	(France) : André Rosset, Olivier Bajard and Alain Rolancy	(Canada) : Stéphane Brunelet, Stéphane Seguin and Ken V.J Guberski
1993	(France) : Patrick Casula, Jean-Marc Guillot and Jean-Paul Savioz	(Belgium) : Rik De Baere, Johny De Neef and Pierre Marcolini	(Luxembourg) : Jean-Claude Arens, Alain Gerard and Camille Shumacher
1995	(Belgium) : Pierre Marcolini, Rik de Baere and Gunther Van Essche	(Japan) : Tadashi Yanagi, Taihei Oikawa and Junishi Goto	(United States) : Donald Wressel, Kurt Walrath and Joe Decker
1997	(Italy) : Luigi Biasetto, Cristian Beduschi and Luca Mannori	(United States) : Thaddeus Dubois, Sébastien Canonne, Jacquy Pfeiffer	(Japan) :Taihei Oikawa, Mr Tsujiguchi and Mr Hanaguchi
1999	(France) : Pascal Molines, Emmanuel Ryon and Christian Salembier	(Belgium) : Herman Van Dender, Patrick Aubrion and Frédérique Scailteur	(United States) : Norman R. Love, Eric Perez and Kim Irene O'Flaherty
2001	(United States) : En-Ming Hsu, Ewald Notter and Michel Willaume	(Japan) : Hiroshi Igarashi, Shinpel Asada and Masayuld Fukuda	(Italy) : Silvio Bessone, Leonardo di Carlo and Amelio Mazzela di Regnella
2003	(France) : Angelo Musa, Elie Cazaussus and Youri Neyers	(Japan) : Nohirito Terai, Shigeru Nojima and Yoshinori Matsushima	(Belgium) : Patrick Aubrion, Herman Van Dender and Marc Ducobu
2005	(France) : Christophe Michalak, Philippe Rigolot and Frédérique Deville	(Netherlands) : Ivo Wolters, Jeroen Goossens and Arthur Tuytel	(United States) : Donald Wressel, Dereck Poirier and Andrex Shotts
2007	(Japan) : Yuklo Ichikawa, Toshimi Fujimoto and Kazuya Nagata	(Belgium) : Dominiek Vandermeulen, Thierry Winant and Pol De Schepper	(Italy) : Fabrizio Donatone, Angelo di Masso and Fabrizio Galla
2009	(France) : Jérôme De Oliveira, Jérôme Langillier, Marc Rivière	(Italy) : Alessandro Dalmasso, Giancarlo Cortinovis and Domenico Longo	(Belgium) : Alain Vandermissen, François Galtier and Raphaël Giot
2011	(Spain) : Jordi Bordas Santacreu, Julien Alvares, Josep Guerola	(Italy) : Domenico Longo, Davide Comaschi and Emmanuele Forcon	(Belgium) : Dieter Charels, Marijn Coertjens and Pascal de Deyne
2013	(France) : Quentin Bailly, Mathieu Blandin, Joffrey Lafontaine	(Japan) : Daisuke Tomita, Koh Moriyama, Tetsuro Akasaki	(Italy) : Francesco Boccia, Lucca Cantarin, Marcello Boccia
2015	(Italy) : Emmanuele Forcone, Francesco Boccia, Fabrizio Donatone	(Japan) : Kazuhiro Nakayama, Junji Tokunaga, Shinichi Sugita	(United States) : John Kraus, Joshua Johnson, Scott Green
2017	(France) : Etienne Leroy, Bastien Girard, Jean-Thomas Schneider	(Japan) : Takahiro Komai, Yoshiaki Uezaki, Takao Yamamoto	(Switzerland) : Cédric Pilloud, Jorge Cardoso, Jean-Baptiste Jolliet
2019	(Malaysia) : Tan Wei Loon, Otto Tay, and Loi Ming Ai	(Japan) : Ito Fumiaki, Mirai Nishiyama, Ryohei Oguma	(Italy) : Lorenzo Puca, Mattia Cortinovis, Andrea Restuccia
2021	(Italy) : Massimo Pica, Lorenzo Puca and Andrea Restuccia	(Japan) : Seiya Harada, Yuuya Tsukada, Kengo Akabame	(France) : Kevin Ollivier, Nabil Moudni, Fabien Emery
2023	(Japan) : Moe Takahashi, Naritoshi Suzuka and Yusaku Shibata	(France) : Georges Kousanass, Jérémy Massing and Jana Lai	(Italy) : Jacopo Zorzi, Alessandro Petito and Martina Brachetti
2025	(Japan) : Masanori Hata, Yuji Matoba and Ryu Miyazaki	(France) : Jérémy Massing, Haruka Atsuji and Mickaël Guyader	(Malaysia) : Fong Kah Mun, Foo Yi Qing and Tyler Tan

=== Medal count ===
Rank	Nation	Gold	Silver	Bronze	Total
1	France (FRA)	8	3	1	12
2	Japan (JPN)	4	8	1	13
3	Italy (ITA)	3	2	5	10
4	Belgium (BEL)	1	3	3	7
5	United States (USA)	1	1	4	6
6	Malaysia (MAS)	1	0	1	2
7	Spain (ESP)	1	0	0	1
8	Netherlands (NED)	0	2	0	2
9	Austria (AUT)	0	0	1	1
9	Canada (CAN)	0	0	1	1
9	Luxembourg (LUX)	0	0	1	1
9	Switzerland (SUI)	0	0	1	1
Totals (12 entries)		19	19	19	57

== See also ==
- Asian Pastry Cup
