= Michalík =

Michalik or Michalík is a West Slavic surname derived from the given name Michal. Notable people with the surname include:

- Alexis Michalik (born 1982), actor, scriptwriter and director
- Art Michalik (1930–2021), American football player
- Jan Michalik (1948–2022), Polish sport wrestler
- Jessica Michalik (1985–2001)
- Józef Michalik (1941–2026), Polish archbishop
- Krystian Michalik (born 1944), Polish footballer
- Ľubomír Michalík (1983, Čadca), Slovak footballer
- Mário Michalík (born 1973), Slovak football goalkeeper
- Michal Michalík (born 1980), Czech modern pentathlete
- Monika Michalik (born 1980), Polish sport wrestler
- Pavol Michalík (born 1951), Slovak football goalkeeper
- Piotr Michalik (born 1957), Polish wrestler
- Rastislav Michalík (born 1974), Slovak footballer
- Tadeusz Michalik, Polish sport wrestler

== Other ==
- Jama Michalika
