= Johannes Michalak =

Johannes Michalak is a German clinical psychologist at the Witten/Herdecke University. He is known for his work in the fields of Mindfulness-based cognitive therapy and embodiment in clinical psychology. He is one of the directors of the Achtsamkeits institute in Ruhr (an institute for mindfulness training in Germany).

== Life ==
Johannes Michalak studied psychology at the Ruhr-University Bochum and completed his doctorate there in 1999. In the same year he received his license as a psychological psychotherapist. He was an acting professor at Heidelberg University (Germany, 2005–06) and at the University of Bochum (Germany, 2009–10) and visiting professor at Queen's University of Kingston (Canada, 2009). In 2011 he was appointed as a full-time professor at the University of Hildesheim.

Since 2014 he has been professor of clinical psychology and psychotherapy at Witten/Herdecke University.
