= Christophe Michalak =

French pâtissier, author and TV presenter (born 1973)

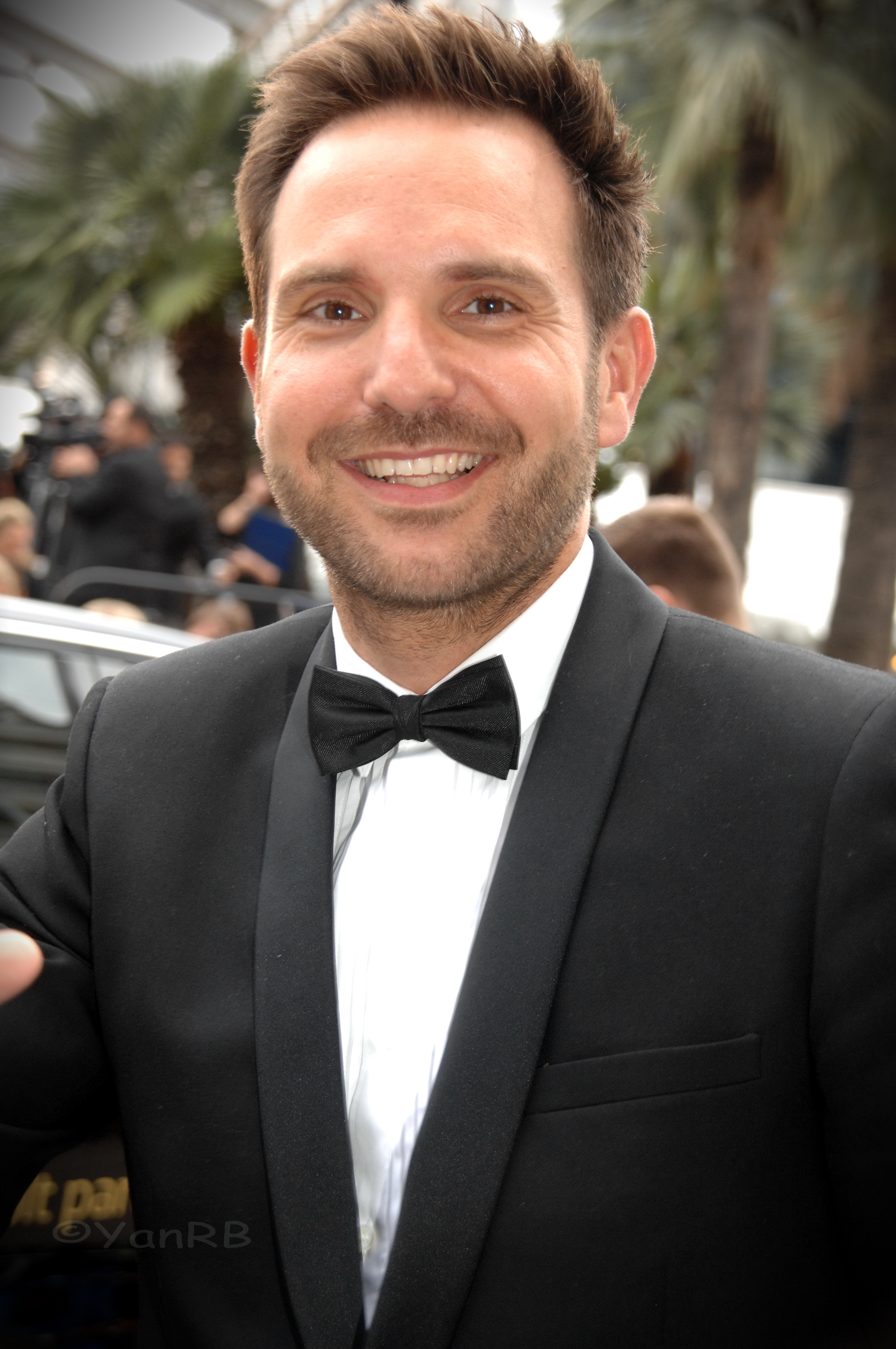
- Michalak in 2015
- Born: 22 July 1973 (age 53); Senlis, Oise, France
- Spouse: Delphine McCarty
- Culinary career
- Cooking style: Pastry
- Rating
- Michelin
- Current restaurant
- Plaza Athenaeum
- Website: http://www.christophemichalak.com/

Christophe Michalak (pronounced [kʁi.stɔf mi.ʃa.lak]; born 22 July 1973) is a French Master Pâtissier (pastry chef), author and television presenter.

== Biography ==
Michalak was born in Senlis, France. Michalak has stated that as a young child, he originally wanted to become an architect. However, at the age of 15, Michalak started his journey to becoming a pastry master. Michalak studied for his certificate of professional excellence in pâtisserie at the trade school of Angers. In August 2013, Michalak married actress Delphine McCarty.

== Career ==
After achieving his certificate of professional competence, at the age of 16, Michalak decided to learn his trade across the world. Michalak has studied and worked in many well-known restaurants and pâtisserie across the world.

Michalak currently works with world-renowned chef Alain Ducasse at the Michelin three-starred Plaza Athénée in Paris.
1991 - 1993 | Hilton London and Brussels
1993 - 1995 | Hotel Negresco, Nice (Michelin)
1995 - 1997 | Fauchon, Paris
1997 - 1998 | Kobe, Japan
1998 - 1999 | Pierre Hermé, New York
1999 - 2000 | Ladurée, Paris
2000 | Plaza Athénée, Paris (Michelin)
2007 | Paulette Macarons, Beverley Hills, California
2013 | Michalak Takeaway, Paris

In 2013, Michalak set up a pastry training school, "Michalak's Master Class", in Paris.

== Awards ==
2005 World Champion Pâtissier (as part of the French Team)
2013 Pastry Chef of the Year

== Bibliography ==
Michalak has authored five cookbooks and also published a collection of best recipes.

- Christophe Michalak, Les desserts qui me font craquer (Desserts I'm crazy about), Paris, Édition Plon, 2010
- Christophe Michalak, Les chocolat qui me font craquer (Chocolate I'm crazy about), Paris, Édition Plon, 2011
- Christophe Michalak, Le gâteau de mes rêves (Cake of my dreams), Paris, M6 Éditions, 2012
- Alain Ducasse and Christophe Michalak, Best of Michalak, Paris, 2013
- Christophe Michalak, Les meilleurs desserts de France (Best Desserts of France), Paris, Éditions Gründ, 2013
- Christophe Michalak, C'est du gâteau (It's the cake), Paris, Éditions Gründ, 2014

== Television ==
Michalak has headlined three cookery programmes on French television aiming to demystify the complexities of French pastry and has also been involved in the French version of MasterChef.

From February 2012 to June 2013, Michalak was the host of the programme 'Le gâteau de mes rêves (Cake of my dreams)', which was broadcast on the Téva channel.

In July 2013, Michalak became a judge on 'Qui sera le prochain grand pâtissier (Who's the next great pâtissier)' on the France 2 channel.

From September 2013, Michalak co-produced and presented 'Dans la peau d'un chef (In a chef's shoes)' for the France2 television channel.
