= Chocolatier =

Someone who makes confectionery from chocolate

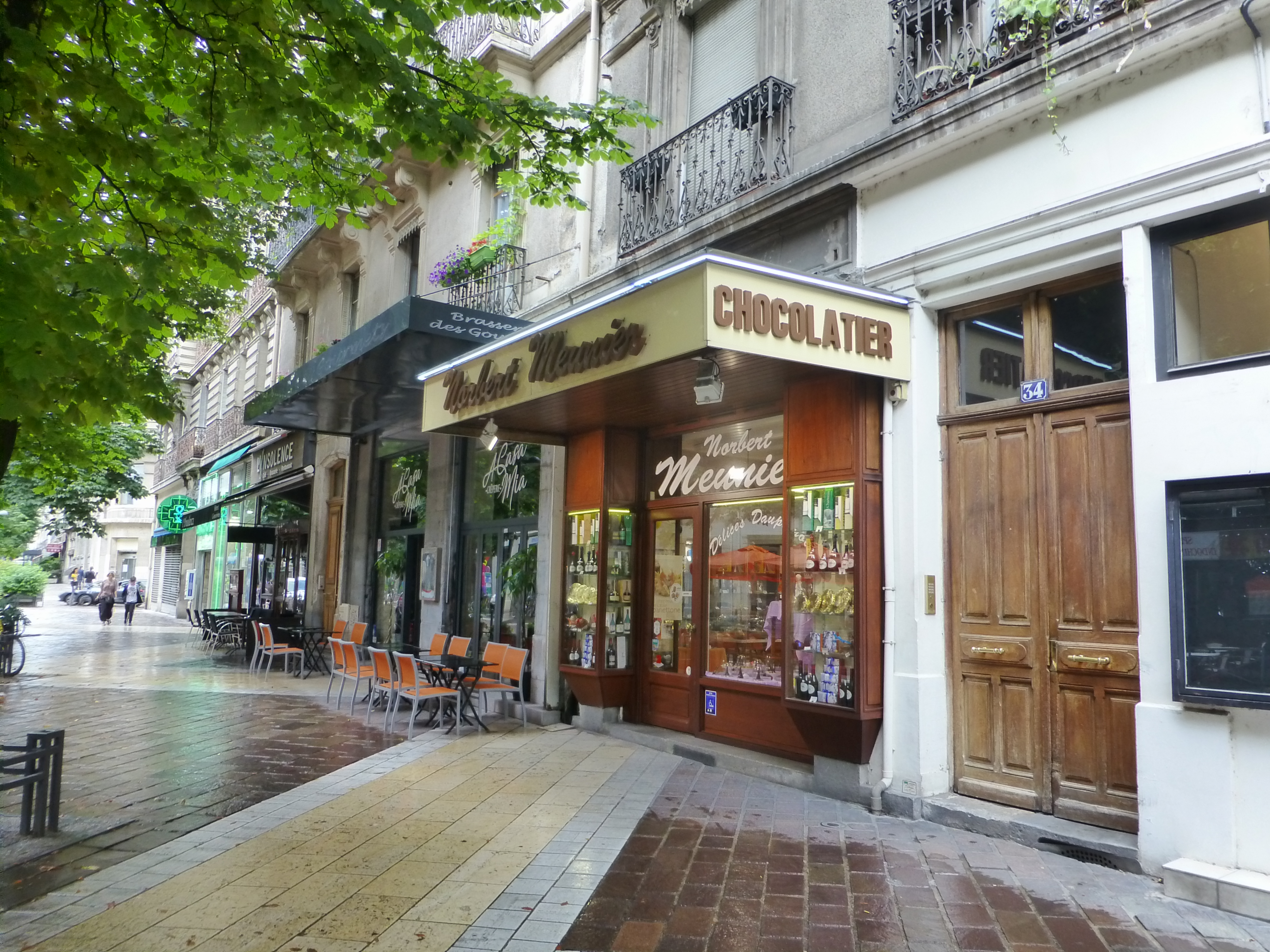
Chocolatier in Grenoble, France

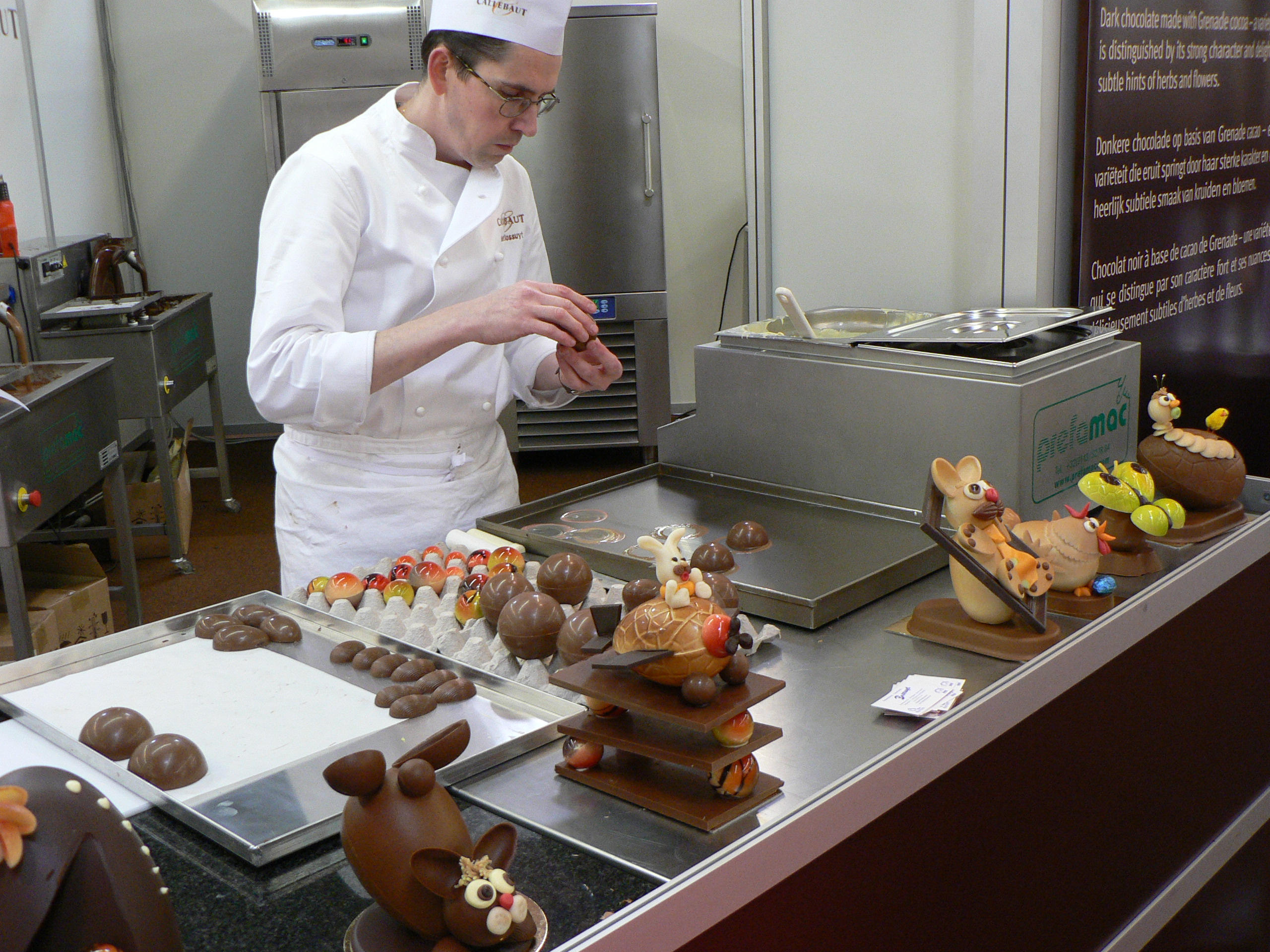
A chocolatier making chocolate eggs

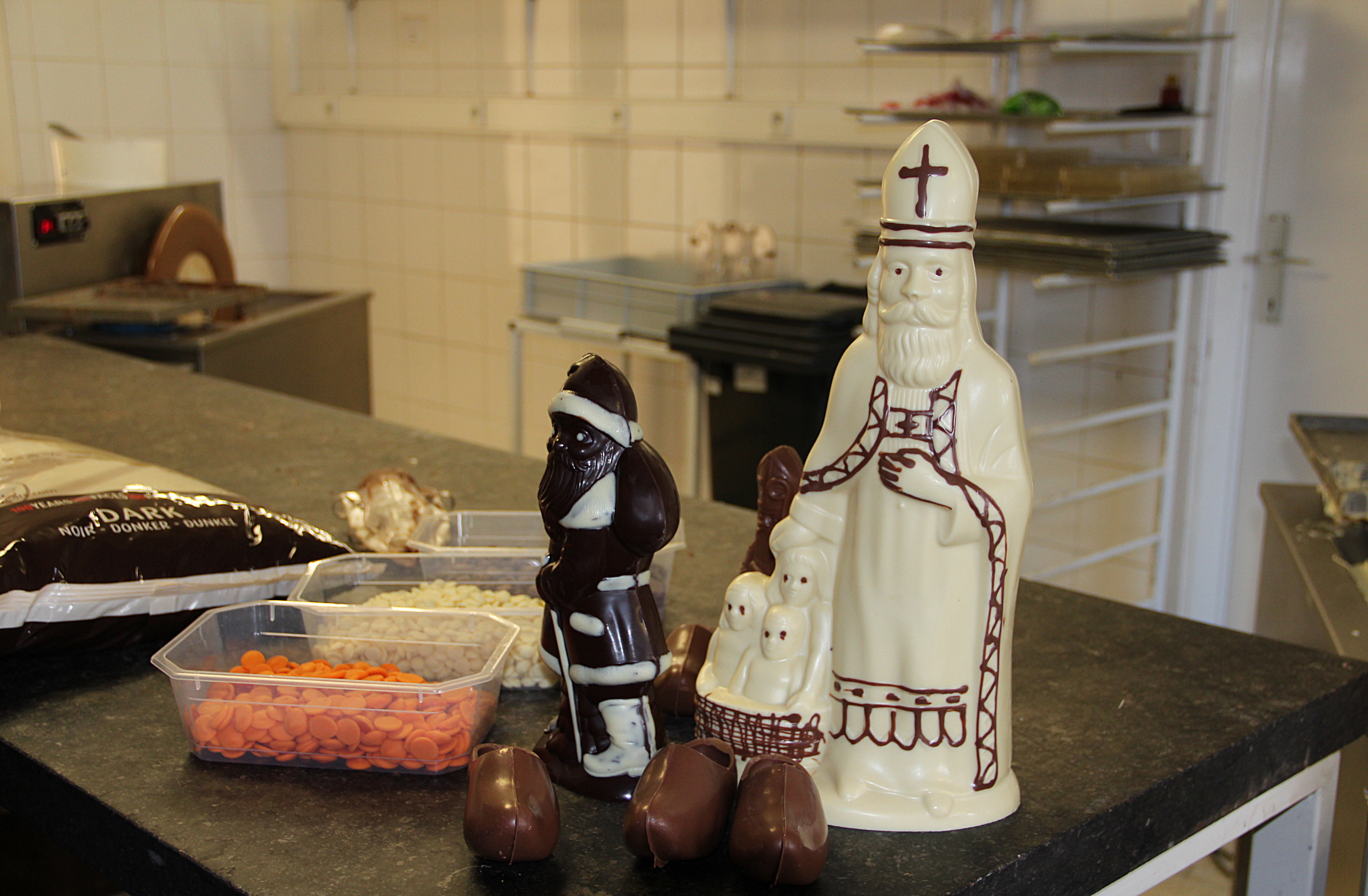
Hollow chocolate figures for Saint Nicholas and Christmas celebrations

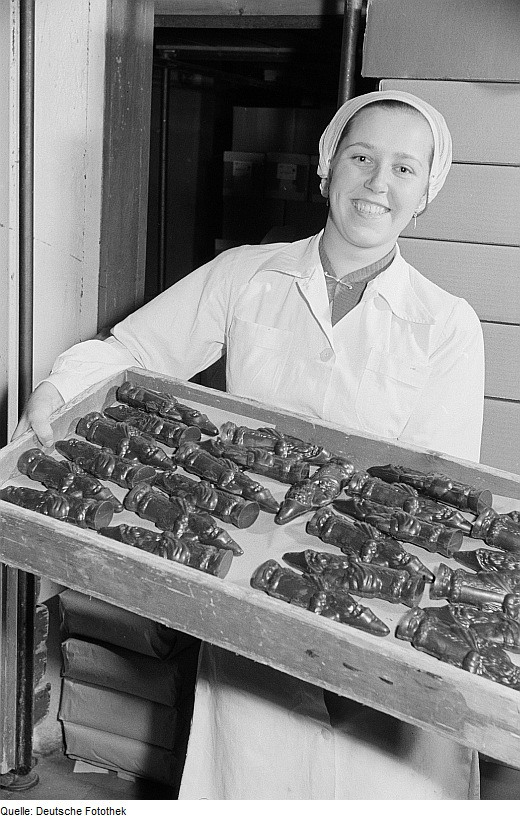
A woman at the VEB Felsche factory with a box of chocolate Santa Clauses

A chocolatier (Note: English: /ˌtʃɒkələˈtɪər, ˈtʃɒkələtɪər, ˌtʃɒkəˈlætiər/ CHOK-əl-ə-TEER, -teer, CHOK-ə-LAT-ee-ər, UK also /ˌʃɒkəlætiˈeɪ/ SHOK-əl-at-ee-AY, US also /ˌʃɒkəlɑːtiˈeɪ/ SHOK-əl-ah-tee-AY; French: [ʃɔkɔlatje].) is a person or company that makes and sells chocolate confections. Chocolatiers are distinct from chocolate makers, who create chocolate from cacao beans and other raw ingredients. Chocolatiers work artisanally with pre-made chocolate mass, and within the chocolate industry are sometimes referred to derisively as "melters". Chocolatiers are often trained as pastry chefs or confectioners specializing in chocolate and making chocolate candies.

In the food industry, food technologists or food technology engineers develop chocolate products for large chocolate brands.

== Education and training ==
Training usually begins with basic chocolate confections, progressively learning more intricate techniques to create sculptures and other creations. Techniques studied include tempering, sculpting, and melting. Education also involves the study of chocolate's physical and chemical attributes.

Historically, chocolatiers, especially in Europe, were trained through an apprenticeship with other chocolatiers. It is now common for chocolatiers to start out as pastry or confectionery chefs, or attend culinary training specializing in chocolate.

=== Culinary schools ===
There are a variety of culinary schools and specialty chocolate schools, including the Ecole Chocolat Professional School of Chocolate Arts in Canada, and The Chocolate Academy by Callebaut, with over 20 different schools around the world. The International Culinary Center (formerly known as the French Culinary Institute) offers pastry and confectionery courses.

Programs of study at such institutions can include topics including the history of chocolate, chemistry, techniques, confectionery formulae based on ganache and/or fondant, and business management skills.

== Techniques ==
Tempering chocolate involves heating and cooling the chocolate to produce a product with desired shine and breaking characteristics ("snap"). Chocolate contains cocoa butter which crystallizes as chocolate is heated and cooled. Specific crystal structures are produced by heating chocolate at certain temperatures for specific periods of time and then cooling the chocolate and working with it in alternating segments. The temperatures that produce certain outcomes vary with the type of chocolate (e.g., white, milk or dark) being used.

Other techniques include molding liquid chocolate into various shapes and permitting it harden, dipping, decorating, and sculpting, the last at times involving molds, sculpting tools (such as spatulas or carving tools), and pieces of chocolate, and decorating the piece with designs in chocolate.

== Competitions ==
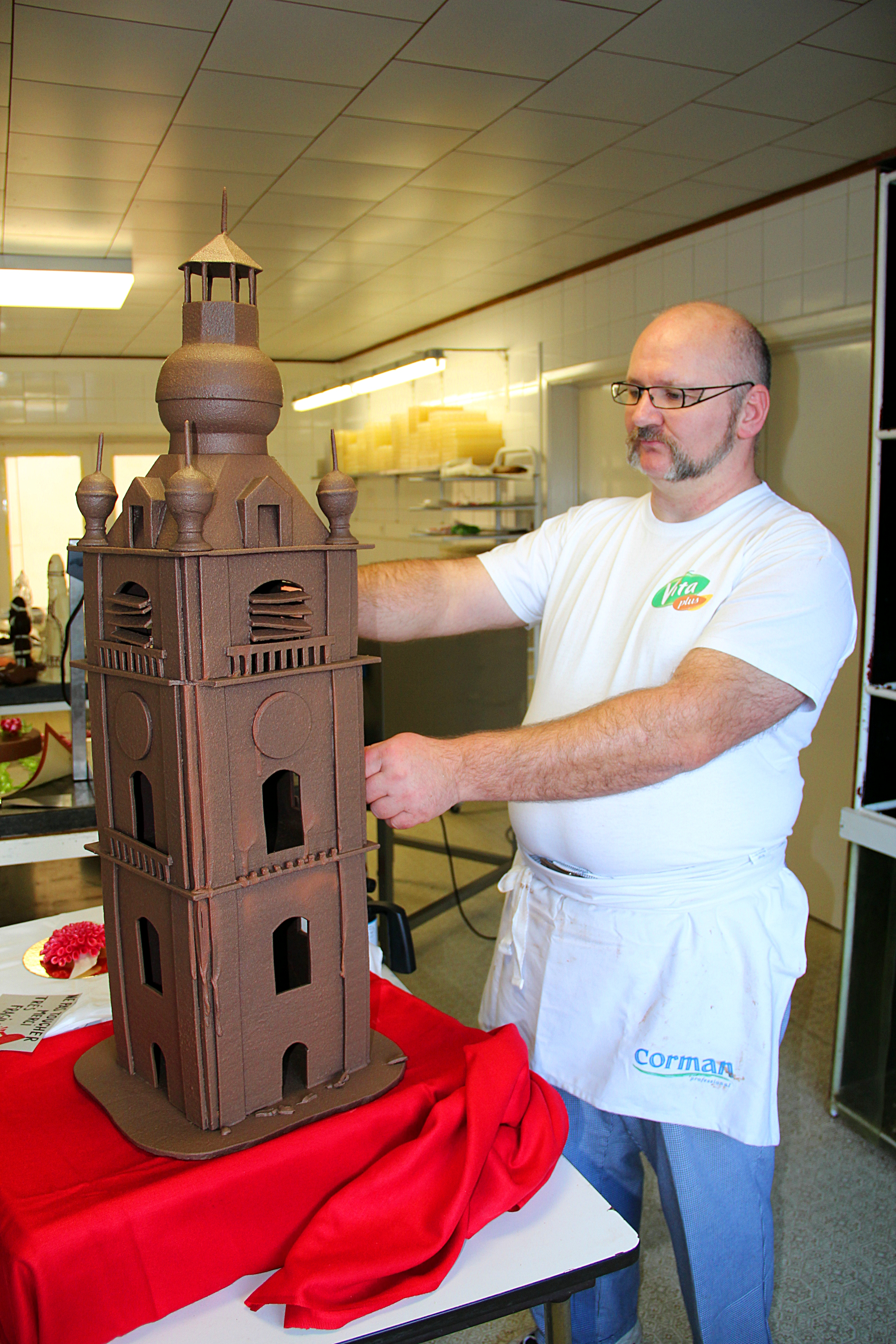
A chocolatier making a chocolate tower

A "Master Chocolatier" is someone who is considered to have mastered chocolate as a form of artistry. The best of these compete in The World Chocolate Masters, a chocolate competition that started in 2005. The World Chocolate Masters competition is held every three years in Paris, France. At the competition, the world's top chocolate masters craft a chocolate masterpiece to be judged by a jury.

Leading chocolatiers include Pierre Marcolini from Belgium.

Another well-known chocolate competition is the International Chocolate Awards, set up by the International Institute of Chocolate and Cacao Tasting. The International Chocolate Awards, founded in 2012, holds regional competitions in many countries around the world. The winners of the regional competitions later attend the World Final to compete among the best chocolatiers from other regions.

== Literature ==
- Chantal Coady: Schokolade. Das Handbuch für Genießer. Taschen Verlag, Cologne 1998, ISBN 3-822-87596-1. (presents the leading chocolatiers throughout Europe on two pages each)
- Pierre Hermé, Danielle Monteaux: Carrément Chocolat. Agnès Viénot Éditions, Paris 2009, ISBN 978-2-35326-058-4.
- Ewald Notter: Handwerk Schokolade: Techniken – Rezepturen – Schaustücke. Matthaes Verlag, Stuttgart 2013, ISBN 978-3-87515-126-8.
- Oriol Balaguer: Obsession. Matthaes Verlag, Stuttgart 2016, ISBN 978-3-87515-131-2.
- Fabian Rehmann: Bean to Bar: Von der Kakaobohne zur Schokoladentafel. Praxisbuch. Leopold Stocker Verlag, Graz, Stuttgart 2019, ISBN 978-3-7020-1780-4.

== Movies ==
- Kings of Pastry. Documentary, USA, France, 2009, 87 min, Director: Chris Hegedus, D. A. Pennebaker, Production: Pennebaker Hegedus Films, Movie page. Observations from the annual Meilleur Ouvrier de France (M.O.F.) competition in France and others during the production of the fragile chocolate showpieces under tension and with the participation of the judges.
- Schokoland Salzburg. Die Kunst der Verführung. Documentary film, Austria, 2014, 22:40 min., written and directed by: Matthias Vogt, production: ORF, first broadcast: August 8, 2014 in ORF III, series: Our Austria, table of contents by ORF, (Memento from August 14, 2014, in internet archive).
