= Belgian chocolate =

Chocolate produced in Belgium

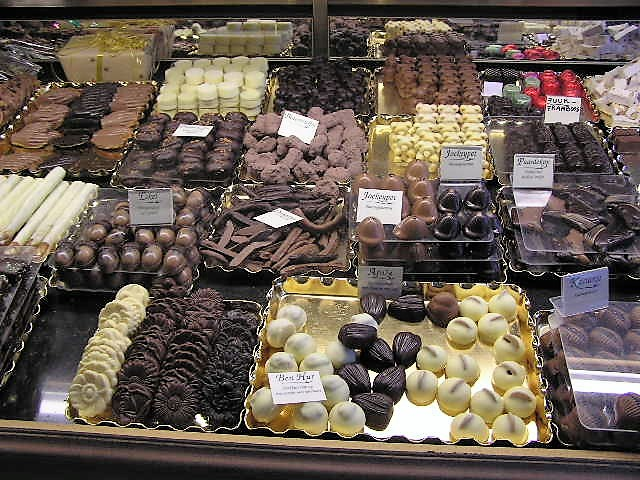
Some varieties of pralines in a chocolatier in Antwerp

Belgian chocolate (Dutch: Belgische chocolade; French: Chocolat belge; German: Belgische Schokolade) is chocolate produced in Belgium. A major industry since the 19th century, today it forms an important part of the nation's economy and culture.

The raw materials used in chocolate production do not originate in Belgium; most cocoa is produced in Africa, Central America, and South America. Nonetheless, the country has an association with the product that dates to the early 17th century. The industry expanded massively in the 19th century, gaining an international reputation and, together with the Swiss, Belgium became one of the commodity's most important producers in Europe. Although the industry has been regulated by law since 1894, there is no universal standard for the chocolate to be labelled "Belgian". The most commonly accepted standard dictates that the actual production of the chocolate must take place inside Belgium.

== History ==
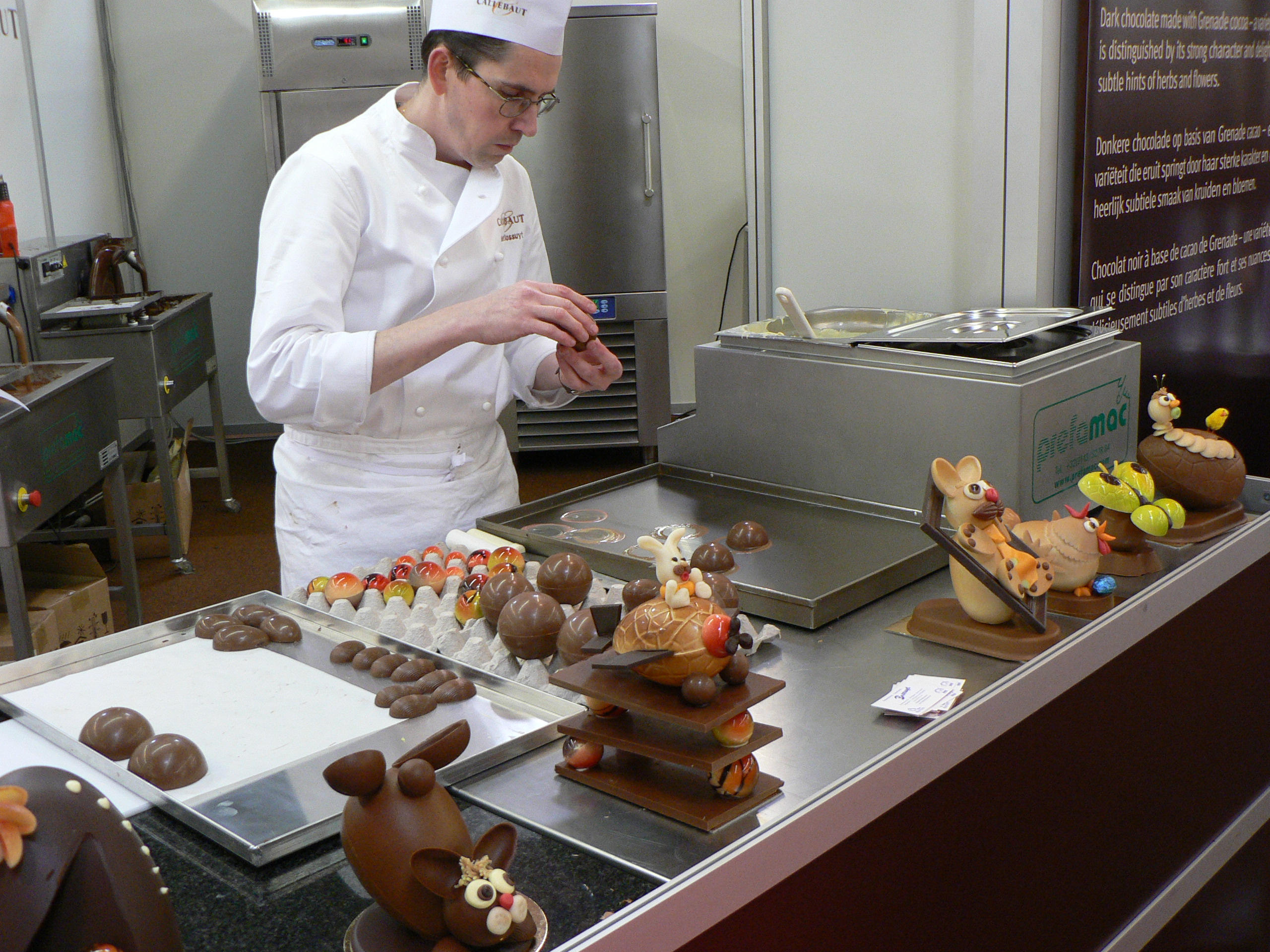
A chocolatier producing easter eggs in Bruges

Chocolate entered Belgium in 1635 while the country was under Spanish occupation, shortly after the Spanish had brought chocolate to Europe from Mesoamerica. By the mid-18th century, chocolate had become extremely popular among upper and middle-class circles as hot chocolate. One fan was Charles-Alexander of Lorraine, the Austrian governor of the territory. From the early 20th century, the country was able to import large quantities of cocoa from its African colony, the Belgian Congo. By this time, chocolate was increasingly affordable for the Belgian working class. According to one study, Belgium first started to export more chocolate than it imported in the 1960s, with exports of "Belgian chocolates" growing exponentially since 1980.

The praline is an invention of the Belgian chocolate industry, as is the ballotin, a kind of packaging associated with high-quality chocolate that was designed by Louise Agostini, the wife of Jean Neuhaus Jr., in 1915.

== Production and standards ==
The composition of Belgian chocolate has been regulated by law since 1894 when a minimum level of 35% pure cocoa was imposed to prevent adulteration with non-cocoa fats. Attempts to introduce industry standardisation have met with little success. An attempt by the European Economic Community (EEC) to introduce minimum standards about the amount of cocoa butter substitutes across Europe led to prolonged negotiation but the legislation finally enacted, in 2003, was viewed as excessively lenient in Belgium. In 2007, a voluntary quality standard (to which about 90 percent of the country's chocolate makers adhere) was introduced by the European Union which set certain criteria for a product to be considered "Belgian chocolate". Under this "Belgian Chocolate Code", refining, mixing and conching must be done inside Belgium.

Controversy about what can legitimately be called "Belgian chocolate" has been fueled by some traditional Belgian chocolatiers being purchased by non-Belgian companies and even moving production out of Belgium. Ignace Van Doorselaere, chief executive of chocolatier Neuhaus, insists that "In our dictionary, Belgian means place of manufacturing, headquarters and ownership", but without an EU protected food status designation, those chocolatiers who remain 100% Belgian find the "Belgian chocolate" brand hard to protect.

Many firms produce chocolates by hand, which is laborious and explains the prevalence of small, independent chocolate outlets, which are popular with tourists.

== Varieties ==
=== Pralines ===
Pralines made in Belgium are usually soft-centred confections with a chocolate casing. They are distinct from the nut and sugar sweets popular in France and the United States which are sometimes known by the same name. They were first introduced by Jean Neuhaus II in 1912.

There have always been many forms and shapes, although they almost always consist of a chocolate shell with a softer filling. Confusion can arise over the use of the word praline in Belgium as it may refer to filled chocolates in general or sometimes to traditional "praliné"-filled chocolates popular in Europe (praliné refers to caramelised hazelnuts or almonds ground into a paste). Belgian pralines are not limited to the traditional praliné filling and often include nuts, marzipan, salted caramel, coffee, liquors, cream liqueur, cherry or a chocolate blend that contrasts with the outer shell. They are often sold in stylised boxes in the form of a gift box. The largest manufacturers are Neuhaus, Godiva, Leonidas, and Guylian.

=== Truffles ===
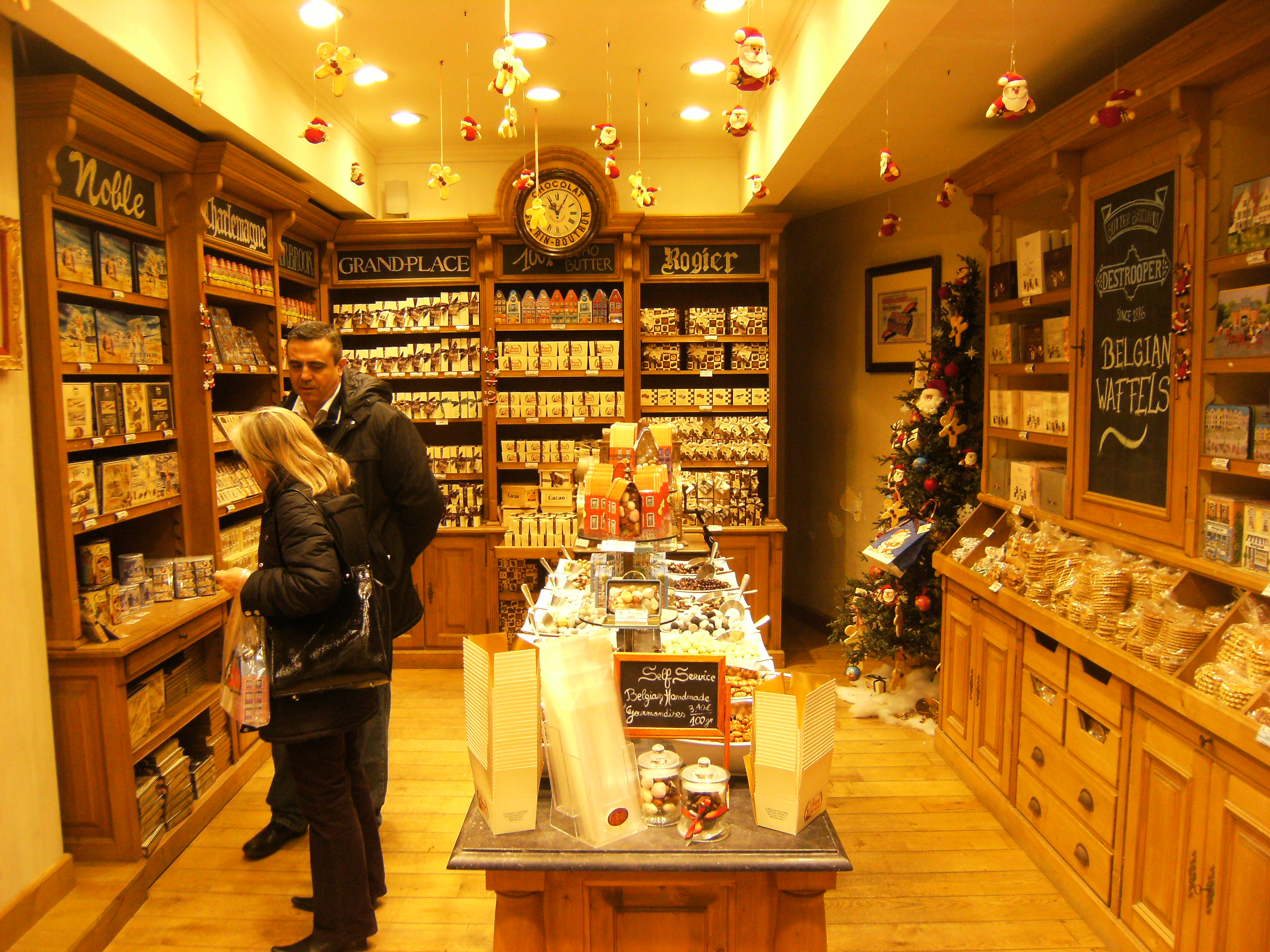
The interior of a typical chocolate shop in Brussels

Most commonly in the form of a flaky or smooth chocolate ball or traditionally a truffle-shaped lump, Belgian chocolate truffles are sometimes in encrusted form containing wafers or coated in a high-quality cocoa powder. They contain a soft ganache which is traditionally a semi-emulsion of liquid and therefore has a couple of days' shelf-life at low temperatures and/or requires refrigeration. Special truffles sometimes have a fruit, nut or coffee ganache. Rarely they feature a fruit-based liqueur or cream liqueur but remain distinguishable from pralines by their shape and texture in most cases—crossover 'praline-truffles' also exists.

=== Eggs, animals and figurines ===
Hand-finished and luxury examples of eggs, animals, figurines and Valentine's Day hearts are made by many smaller Belgian chocolatiers, as elsewhere, accounting for a relatively small market share however in peak demand at Valentine's Day, Easter, Sinterklaas and Christmas.

== Economics ==
Chocolate plays an important part in the Belgian economy, and there are over 2,000 chocolatiers in the country, both small and large. As of 2012, chocolate was very popular in Belgium, with 172,000 tonnes produced each year, and widely exported. Côte d’Or is probably the largest commercial brand, with their products available in virtually every grocery store in the country. The largest manufacturers of wider varieties of chocolates are mentioned at Pralines. Belgian pralines (fondants) shaped like sea shells, fish, diamonds and individualist creations topped with are sold in town centre shops, market stands and many village shops across Belgium.

== Belgian brands and chocolatiers ==
- Callebaut
- Côte d'Or
- Galler
- Godiva
- Guylian
- Leonidas
- Pierre Marcolini
- Meurisse
- Neuhaus
- Planète Chocolat

== See also ==
- Belgian cuisine
- Choco-Story – a museum in Bruges dedicated to chocolate
