= Praline =

Praline can refer to

- Praline (nut confection), a confection of nuts and sugar commonly made with sugar, corn syrup, milk, butter, and nut halves.
- Chocolate praline, chocolates with a soft filling.
