= Neuhaus (chocolatier) =

Belgian chocolatier

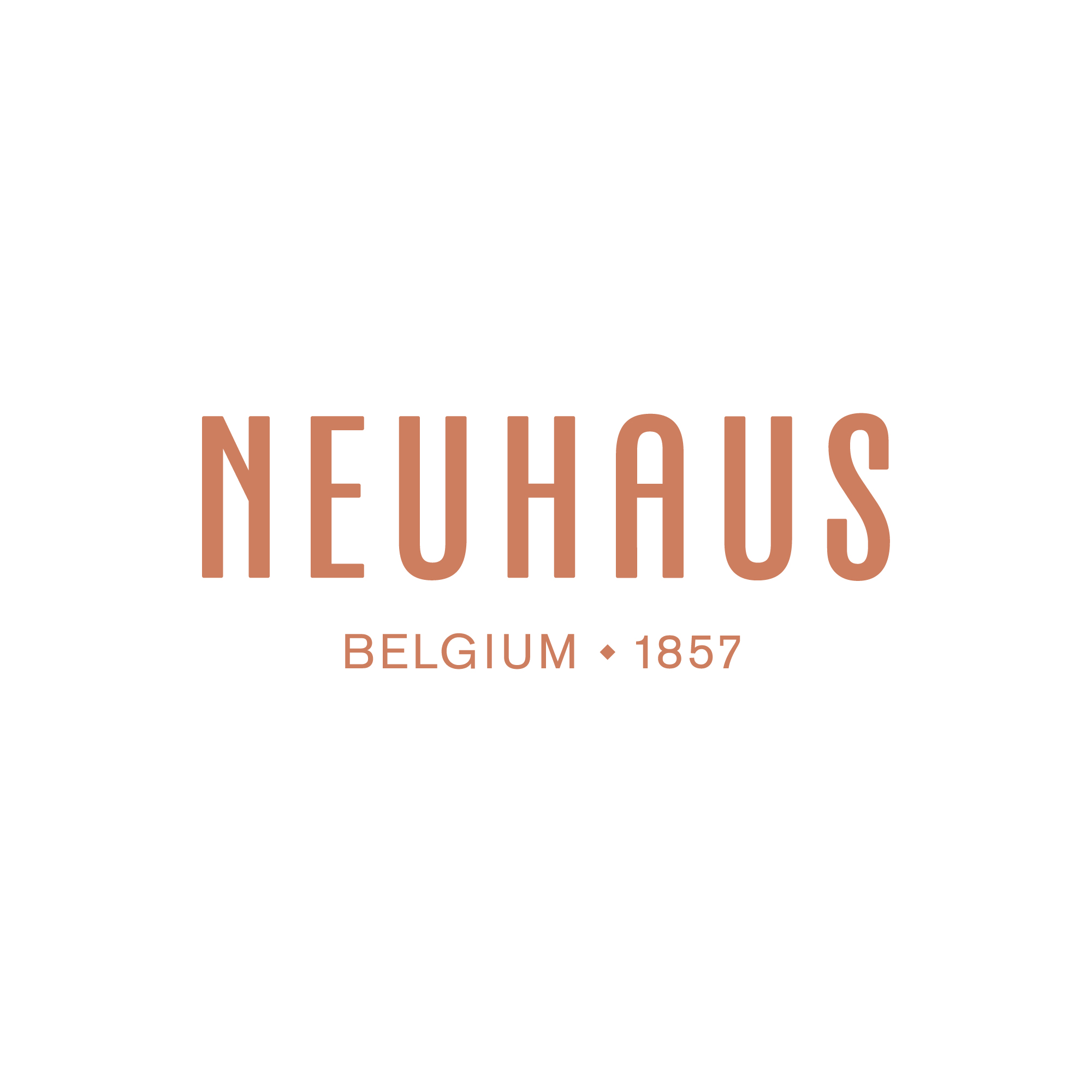
- Industry: Chocolatier
- Founded: 1857; 169 years ago in Brussels, Belgium
- Founder: Jean Neuhaus
- Headquarters: Belgium
- Area served: Worldwide
- Products: Luxury chocolates, chocolate truffles, biscuits and ice cream
- Owner: Compagnie Du Bois Sauvage SA
- Website: Neuhaus Chocolates Official Belgian website

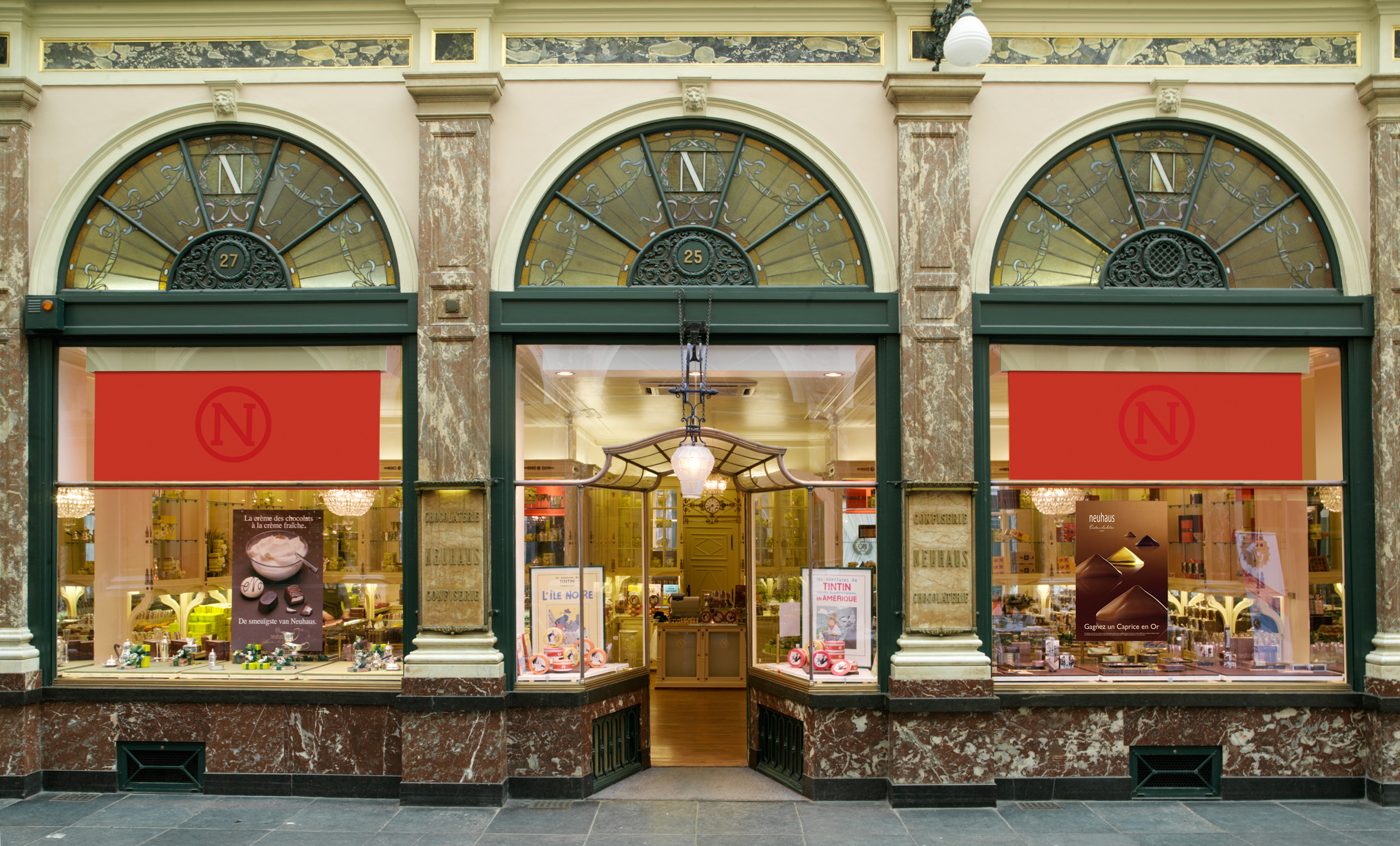
Neuhaus' original shop in the Galeries Royales in Brussels

Neuhaus is a Belgian chocolatier which manufactures and sells luxury chocolates, chocolate truffles, biscuits and ice cream. The company was founded in 1857 by Jean Neuhaus, a Swiss immigrant, who opened the first store in the Galeries Royales Saint-Hubert in central Brussels. In 1912, his grandson, Jean Neuhaus II, invented the chocolate praline, a decadent chocolate cream ganache center inside a chocolate shell, the original filled chocolate.

Today, Neuhaus has over 1,500 selling points in 50 countries. All Neuhaus products are still made in Vlezenbeek, near Brussels, and are exported worldwide. In 2000, the company received the Royal Warrant of Appointment to the Belgian court.

== History ==
Having arrived in Brussels from his native Switzerland, Jean Neuhaus opened an apothecary shop in 1857 at the Galeries Royales, near the Grand-Place. He began his business by covering the medicines in chocolate to make them easier to handle. Liquorices, guimauves (similar to marshmallows) and dark chocolate tablets soon joined more traditional preparations on the display counter.

With the assistance of his son Frédéric, he spent an increasing amount of time and effort in preparing and inventing new delicacies to the point where the regular pharmaceutical products gradually ended up making way for them.

In 1912, the year of Frédéric's death, his son Jean II created the first chocolate-filled bonbons or pralines. They were immediately successful. They were followed by another innovation. Louise Agostini, Jean's wife, realized that the pralines were getting crushed inside the paper cornet bags used to wrap them up. Together with her husband, she developed a gift wrap box in 1915 which became known as the ballotin. The design for the ballotin was patented, the registration document is dated 16 August 1915 at 2.30pm (Belgian time).

Jean's son-in-law, Adelson de Gavre, took over the running of the business. In 1958, he created a series of highly acclaimed pralines such as the Caprice and the Tentation which were first displayed at Expo 58. Suzanne Neuhaus, his wife, specialized in decoration and gift wrapping. The company expanded and stores soon appeared across the country and abroad. The first Neuhaus chocolate boutique in the United States opened in 1999 in New York City.

Today the Neuhaus Belgian chocolate range still includes traditional pralines, but has expanded to include chocolate bars & tablets, BonBons, confectionery, individually wrapped chocolate squares ("Carres"), and hot chocolate. They also create chocolate truffles, which in 2017 Bloomberg Pursuits considered the best chocolate truffle in the world. Their chocolate is 100% UTZ Certified, made with 100% ingredients of natural origin, and is still crafted entirely in Belgium. 25% of the chocolate is produced with cocoa from Neuhaus's own cacao farm in the Guayaquil Region of Ecuador.

== See also ==
- Belgian chocolate
