= Fruits de mer (chocolate) =

Belgian chocolate pralines shaped like seafood

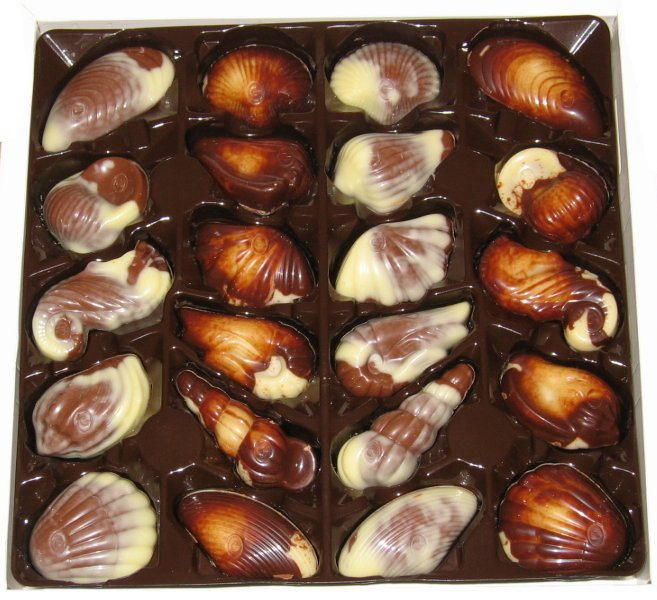
Fruits de mer pralines.

Fruits de mer is a type of Belgian chocolate pralines made of dark and milk chocolate with a nougat filling, in the form of various seafood: seahorses, venus clams, mussels, starfish and various sea snails. The pralines are sold in chocolate shops, in supermarkets, and as handmade products in Konditorei shops.

The Belgian confectionery company Guylian from Antwerp is said to be the first company to produce pralines in the form of seafood. The company has been producing the pralines since the 1960s, first by hand, later by automatic machinery. The main product contains Belgian milk chocolate with 34 percent cocoa, while the Fruits de mer extra dark product has a cocoa content of 74 percent.

Copycat products are sold at German discount stores. Sugar-free pralines have been on the market since 1996 and fair trade pralines from Oxfam since 2001.

== Literature ==
- Dominique Auzias: Le Petit Futé Guide du chocolat et des confiseries. Petit Futé, 2006, ISBN 9782746917224, p. 65 (Google Books)
- L. Mantovano: Maestri del Cioccolato. Verlag G.R.H. S.p.A., 2004, ISBN 978-8-88718080-0, p. 192 (Google Books)
- Jacques Mercier: The Temptation of Chocolate. Lannoo Uitgeverij, 2008, ISBN 978-2-87386533-7, p. 206.
