= Leonidas Kestekides =

Greek chocolatier (1876–1948)

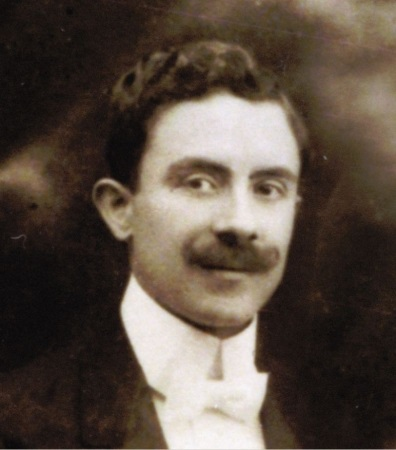
- Born: Leonidas Kestekides; 1876; Nigde, Cappadocia, Ottoman Empire (now Turkey)
- Died: 1948 (aged 71–72); New York City, US
- Occupation: Confectioner
- Known for: Founder, Confiserie Leonidas, philanthropist
- Spouse: Jeanne Emelia Teerlinck (1912–1954)
- Website: www.leonidas.com

Leonidas Kestekides (1876–1948) (Greek: Λεωνίδας Κεστεκίδης) was an Ottoman empire-born Greek chocolate manufacturer, founder of the internationally famous Leonidas company in Belgium. The company's primary focus is pralines (chocolate shells with soft fillings), but they also sell marzipan, solid chocolates, and other confectionery.

== Life ==
Leonidas Kestekides was born to Cappadocian Greek parents in Nigde, Cappadocia (now in Turkey) in 1876. Accounts of his early years vary, but it appears that he left Constantinople (now Istanbul), lived in Greece for a while and then went to Italy, where he became a wine merchant. He struggled financially, so he decided to move to New York City, where he worked as a confectioner from 1893 to 1898, then moved to Paris until 1908.

In 1910, he travelled to Belgium to attend the 1910 World Fair in Brussels, where he was awarded the bronze medal for his chocolate confectionery. He returned to Belgium in 1913, attended the World Fair in Ghent, and moved permanently to Belgium, having met a young woman from Brussels during his visit. He opened tea-rooms in Brussels, Ghent and Blankenberge, and the business expanded from there.
