= Chokotoff =

Belgian chocolate toffee

Chokotoff is a chocolate toffee that was created by Côte d'Or in Belgium in 1934. It has become an iconic Belgian product.

== Description ==
At the centre of the sweet is a semi-hard chocolate caramel candy measuring 30mm x 15mm x 15 mm. This part comes in the form of a slanted cuboid and is coated with a crunchy dark chocolate shell that is 2 mm thick. The wrapper is made of dark brown greaseproof paper (which calls to mind the colour of the chocolate) the ends of which, twisted closed, are printed with a gold houndstooth pattern. The middle of the wrapping is covered with gold and brown laminated foil, bearing the names "Chokotoff", "Côte d'Or" and the company's logo, an elephant.

The name of the sweet combines the prefix "choko" (for chocolate) and the contraction of the word "toffee". It is likely that the creator also wanted to use a play on words to allude to the term tof, which in Dutch means nice, great or enjoyable.

In 2010, Côte d'Or brought out a new Chokotoff with a caramel centre that sticks to the traditional recipe, but using white chocolate instead of plain chocolate for the shell.

== Production ==
In June 2011, the Kraft Foods group, owner of the Côte d'Or brand, announced the relocation of Chokotoff production to Eastern Europe, scheduled for 2013. From 2012, this brand of chocolate, established in Halle, Belgium, since its creation, was to produce its Chokotoffs in Lithuania with Belgian chocolate. However, the possibility of losing this highly symbolic brand set off strong reactions among employees. In February 2012, the Belgian socialist trade union BBTK announced that the production would remain in Halle, thereby reducing job losses.
