= Galler (chocolate) =

Belgian confectionery company

- Revenue: 26,331,620 euro (2016)
- Number of employees: 147 (2016)

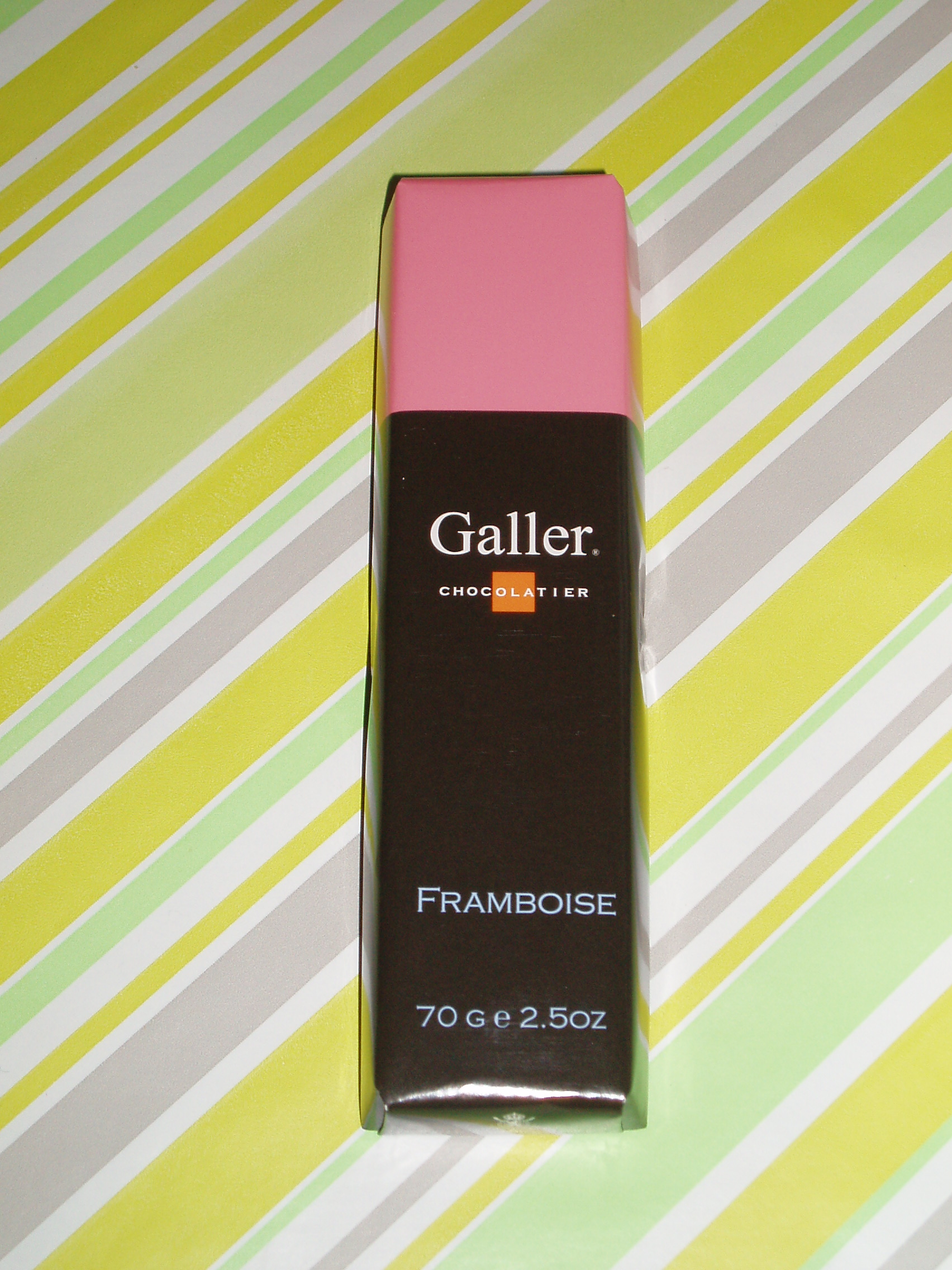
Galler chocolate

Galler (founded 1976) is a Belgian confectionery company, which has its head office in Vaux-sous-Chèvremont, a tiny village in the area of Liège. The company markets various products such as chocolate bars, slabs of chocolate, pralines, macarons, ice cream, and spreads. It also has a number of franchised boutiques under its brand.

== History ==
Jean Galler, born in Liège on 6 February 1955, began his schooling at the Liège hotel school, and worked as an apprentice in the family bakery founded by his grandfather in 1930. He was distinguished with being named the Best Apprentice in Belgium at the age of 19. He then went to Basel to attend development courses at the school for pastry chefs and confectioners, COBA, before carrying out an internship in 1975 at Gaston Lenôtre in Paris.

Passionate about chocolate, at 21 years old he had the opportunity to take over the facilities of the former chocolate factory Régal des Fées in Clermont-sur-Berwinne, previously owned by chocolate factories Aiglon (Verviers) then Clovis (Pepinster), and so, together with his father, create the Galler Chocolate Factory in Vaux-sous-Chèvremont in 1976.

In 1994, he became Official Supplier by Appointment to the Court of Belgium and the following year he was elected manager of the year by Trends. The same year, Jean Galler worked with cartoonist Philippe Geluck to create "Langues de Chat" illustrating the character of Le Chat. Nearly twenty years later, Geluck and Galler changed their range and named it Les Chocolats du Chat to avoid confusion with biscuits of the same name.

== Development ==
In 2013, the Galler chocolate factory was present in more than thirty countries and had its own network of franchised boutiques in Belgium and abroad. The first boutique was opened in 1995 on the Grand-Place in Brussels and, in 2002, the company received the Innovation Award at the Franchise Fair of Brussels, for the development of his "Chocolate-Tea" concept, tasting rooms of chocolate in all its forms and of tea from different places of origin.

Galler products, particularly Les Chocolats du Chat, are exported to France, Germany, the United Kingdom, Japan, South Korea, the United States, Australia, the United Arab Emirates, and elsewhere.

In 2006, two members of the Qatari royal family Al Thani (Sheikh Sultan and Sheikh Mohamed) invested in 33% of the Belgian company's shares, with the Galler family holding 52% and Galler managers 15%. In 2007, an increase in capital of 2.7 million euros brought the Qatari involvement up to 39% of the company's capital, the Galler family giving up an absolute majority of voting rights in the board of directors, while remaining the main shareholder with 41%. Company executives then held the remaining 12%. In 2011, Qatari shareholders reinvested around 10 million euros. In 2012, several company managers sold their shares to the Al Thani family, which acquired a majority without the exact distribution of shares known because of a confidentiality agreement. In May 2018, the Qataris again strongly increased their shares in the company they now control fully; the founder Jean Galler, who for now remains a minority shareholder, has stepped down as leader to devote himself to creation and communication. Since 5 November 2018, the Qataris have officially been sole shareholders, but with a desire to maintain the Belgian anchorage. Galler chocolates are still produced in Vaux-sous-Chèvremont, where 170 persons work.

In July 2020, 25% of the capital was sold to a group of Belgian investors wishing to pursue the development of the company while making it ethical and responsible. Among these commitments, since 2020 the company has been working with 100% fair trade certified cocoa beans. The logo was then changed to “Independent chocolate factory”.
