= Planète Chocolat =

Belgian chocolate company

- Type: Privately held company
- Industry: Chocolatier
- Founded: 1991
- Headquarters: Rue du Lombard 24, 1000 Brussels, Belgium
- Area served: Worldwide
- Products: Chocolates, Pralines, Truffles
- Website: planetechocolat.com/en

Planète Chocolat is a Belgian chocolatier of artisan chocolates. The company was founded in 1991 and makes its chocolates with 100% pure cocoa butter. GoEuro selected Planète Chocolat as one of the Top 11 best chocolate shops in Europe. Planète Chocolat currently has one store where chocolates are handmade, sold, and distributed.

Planète Chocolat ships pralines with different ganaches, gayettes, mendiants, truffles, biscuits, and hot chocolate worldwide. Chocolate cosmetics and sugar-free chocolate are also produced.

== History ==
Located in the city center of Brussels, Planète Chocolat opened in 1991. The store is decorated with chocolate sculptures, including pieces from the famous Manneken Pis, the city hall, as well as the Atomium, the landmark of Expo 58, Brussels World's Fair.

== Activities ==
Planète Chocolat is known for its chocolate demonstration and chocolate workshop, which hosts up to 55,000 visitors a year. The American travel website TripAdvisor ranks the chocolaterie Planète Chocolat #3 for shopping in Brussels. The mission of the Belgian chocolatier is to inform visitors about the origin and making of chocolate.

Every year, Planète Chocolat co-hosts a chocolate tasting in the luxury hotel Breidenbacher Hof in Düsseldorf. The chocolatier partnered with Miss Belgium 2012, Laura Beyne, for its 2014 chocolate campaign.

== Cultural heritage ==
The Art Deco-inspired logo of Planète Chocolat represents the heritage of the city of Brussels. The Art Deco movement started in the 1910s and imposes classical strictness contrary to the curls and organic shapes of Art Nouveau. Planète Chocolat sells its chocolates online in boxes based on the design of Art Deco themes with lines and geometric shapes.
