= Émile Coppieters =

Belgian politician (1849–1922)

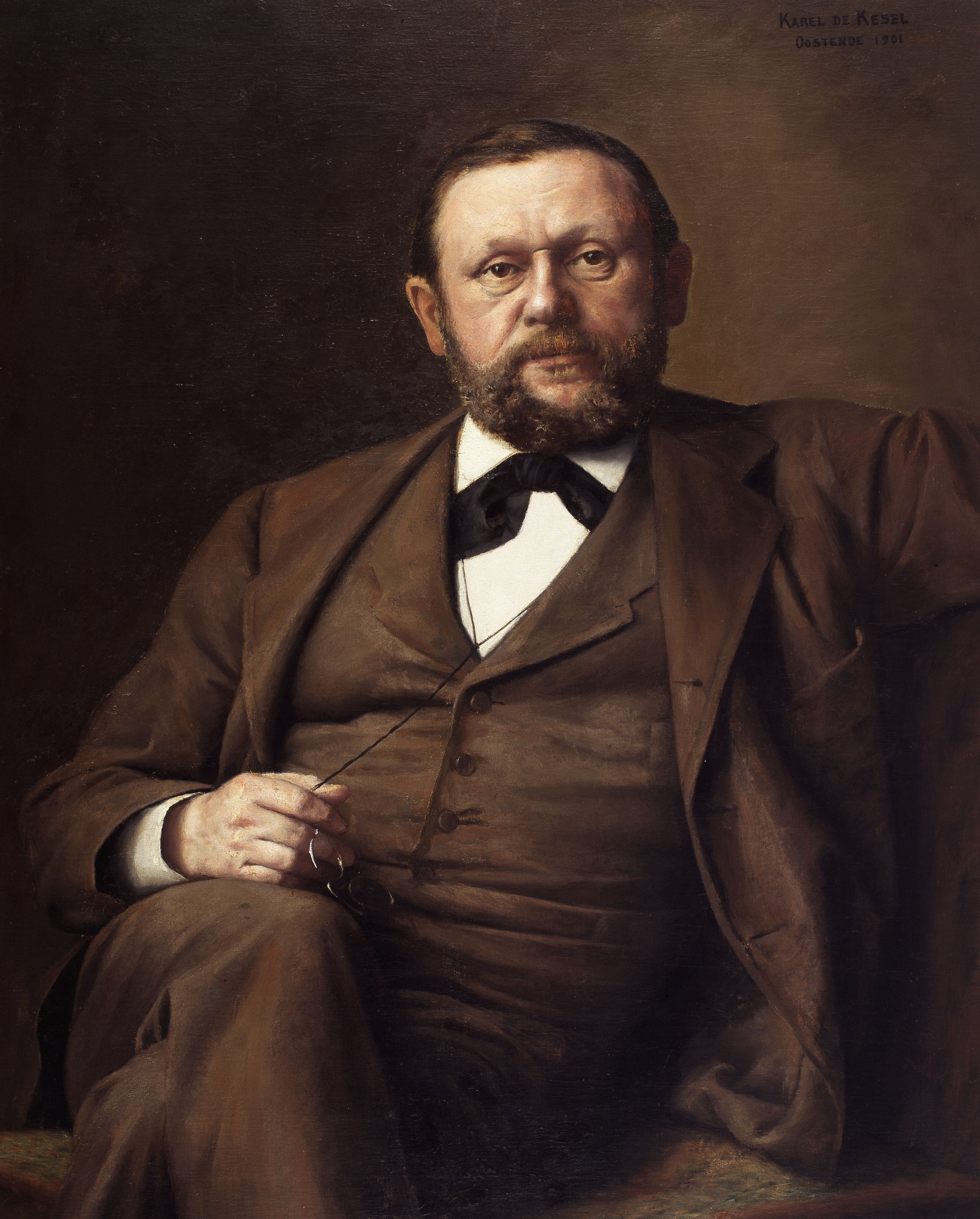
Portrait of Emile-Louis Coppieters

Louis Émile Coppieters (1849–1922) was a politician in the Belgian Labour Party who sat in the Belgian Senate from 1908 until his death.

== Life ==
Coppieters was born in Ghent on 15 December 1849, the son of Pierre Coppieters and Emilie Vanden Berghe.

In 1895 he was elected a Socialist town councillor in Ghent. From 1908 to 1919 he sat in the Senate for the Arrondissement of Liège, and from 1919 until his death for the Arrondissement of Eeklo. He took the leading role in organising the Universal and International Exhibition held in Ghent in 1913. After the First World War he was appointed royal commissioner for the devastated areas, playing a particular role in the post-war rebuilding of Nieuwpoort.

As a private contractor he was involved in works on the ports of Ostend, Bruges, Antwerp and Brussels, and the Charleroi canal.

He died on 15 September 1922.

== Publications ==
- Le Bassin de l’Yser. Documentation scientifique, historique, administrative (Ghent, 1920)
- with C. Janssens, L’eau potable au Bassin de l’Yser (Ghent, 1921)
