= Côte d'Or (chocolate) =

Belgian chocolate company

- Type: Private (1883–1906)
- Industry: Food
- Founded: 1883; 143 years ago
- Founder: Charles Neuhaus
- Fate: Sold to Buiswal-Leclef family in 1889, merged with Michiels in 1906 to form Alimenta S.A.
- Headquarters: Belgium
- Products: Belgian chocolate
- Owner: Mondelez (2012–pres.); Kraft Foods Inc. (1990–2012); Jacobs Suchard (1987–90)
- Website: cotedor.com

Côte d'Or (French pronunciation: [kot dɔʁ]) is a producer of Belgian chocolate, owned by Mondelez International. Côte d'Or was founded in 1883 by Charles Neuhaus in Schaerbeek, Belgium, a chocolate manufacturer who used the name "Côte d'Or" (French for Gold Coast) referring to the old name of contemporary Ghana, the source of many of the cacao beans used in chocolate manufacturing.

Charles Neuhaus sold Côte d’Or in 1889 to the Buiswal-Leclef family, who merged with the Michiels chocolate company in 1906 to create Alimenta S.A.

Côte d'Or was later purchased by Jacobs Suchard in 1987; Jacobs Suchard in turn was purchased by Kraft General Foods in 1990, which spun off its chocolate and confectionery brands into Mondelez International in 2012, making Mondelez the current owner of the Côte d'Or brand.

Belgians consume 600 million Côte d'Or products a year. The Côte d'Or factory in Halle (near Brussels) used to produce 1.3 million mignonnettes (small chocolate bars—they are now produced in Poland) and two million Chokotoffs (chocolate toffees) each day.

== History ==
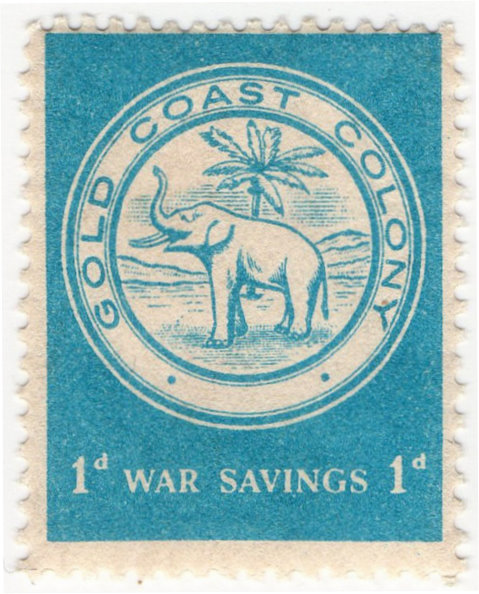
A 1943 war savings stamp of the Gold Coast, reflecting the same elephant and palm tree motif as Côte d'Or logo

In 1883, Charles Neuhaus opened a small chocolate shop in Schaerbeek in the Brussels region. He retired in 1889 and sold his business to Joseph Bieswal and his wife Maria Leclef. They created the Compagnie Joseph Bieswal and shortly afterwards merged with chocolate Michiels to settle in buildings of the former mill Moulart, Bara street in Anderlecht, opposite Brussels-Midi station in 1899. Production would remain there until the 1980s.

The combination of both chocolate and machinery requirements led in 1906 to the creation of the company Alimenta S.A.

The same year, 1906, the Côte d’Or logo was born: an elephant in front of a palm tree and three pyramids, borrowed by Lambert Michiels from a Ghana stamp, which will change only slightly (the current logo is a single elephant) and the graphics brand, which has remained the same since.

The capital of the company became Alimenta S.A. and was increased to 500 000 Belgian francs and new buildings were built in 1908, home to new machines.

The famous 'package' Côte d'Or (two chocolate bars in golden white packaging), which still exists, was created in 1911.

In 1929, Supertoff, a candy toffee precursor appeared (Chokotoff came out in 1934).

During these years the company grew (350 workers at Anderlecht in 1930) and extended: the brand Côte d’Or is registered in the United States in 1931 and the Brussels World Fair in 1935 gives it an international reputation including through the Mignonette, created for the occasion.

=== World War 2 ===
From 1940 to 1946, faced with the difficulty of obtaining quality cocoa beans during World War II, the company decided to retire temporarily the Côte d’Or brand and replace it with the brand Congobar. In addition, one of their factories in Marseilles, France, was destroyed during the German destruction of the Vieux Port district in early 1943. Because of this, Côte d’Or stopped producing chocolate in Marseille, making room for the lower quality Congobar.

=== Post war ===
After World War II, the Côte d’Or brand was reinstated and the creations continued, including the chocolate spread "Pastador" in 1952.

On the occasion of the Universal Exhibition in Brussels in 1958, the praline bar "Dessert 58" was launched.

The company, which got the title "Purveyor to the Royal Court of Belgium" in 1965, accelerated its development in the 1970s: it opened new sales offices in France, the Netherlands (1972), Switzerland and the UK in 1978, while a new factory was built in Seclin in 1974.

The company Côte d’Or of America was founded in 1982, and in 1984—101 years after its founding—Côte d’Or was floated on the Brussels stock exchange. That IPO marked the end of exclusive family control of the company, although the Bieswal, Leclef and Michiels families retained a majority.

In 1987, Nestlé and Jacobs Suchard launched a hostile takeover bid for Côte d’Or, having the effect of a bomb on the financial center in Brussels, unaccustomed to aggressive takeovers. But the families who controlled the company were aware that they needed to grow, with new means that existing shareholders could not provide sufficiently. They ultimately accepted Jacobs Suchard's offer, which valued Côte d’Or at 116.5 million euros (4.7 billion Belgian francs, 26 times the turnover of the time).

The takeover took place in two stages: initially, in 1987, Jacobs Suchard acquired 66% of shares and then finalized the complete takeover in February 1989 with the acquisition of all shares. The stock was then delisted from the Brussels Stock Exchange.

Jacobs Suchard decided to restructure its Belgian subsidiary, which involved the suppression of 264 jobs, but also decided to invest nearly 75 million euros (3 billion Belgian francs) and decided to make a global brand of the group.

Three years later in 1990, Jacobs Suchard was itself absorbed by the cigarette maker Philip Morris who integrated Côte d’Or into the Kraft General Foods group, now renamed Kraft Jacobs Suchard, with the brand Côte d’Or remaining a global quality brand of the group.

In 2000, the parent group took the name "Kraft Foods", and then "Mondelēz international" in 2012 after a split of Kraft Foods.

In 2013, Mondelēz was ranked as number one in chocolate confectionary in Belgium, accounting for 35 per cent of the Belgian chocolate retail value. With a 21 per cent value share, Côte d’Or is currently Mondelēz’s greatest asset. (Euromonitor International 2014)

== Ethical cocoa sourcing ==
There have been continuing question marks over the ethical stance of chocolate brands worldwide. After it became public in 2001 that thousands of children were being trafficked and exploited on the cocoa farms of the Ivory Coast, Kraft, along with the rest of the industry, signed the Harkin–Engel Protocol, promising to remove the worst forms of child labour from the cocoa supply chain.

In October 2009 Kraft launched the first mainstream chocolate products in Europe to carry the Rainforest Alliance Certified seal. Starting in France and Belgium, this Côte d'Or premium dark chocolate contains at least 30 percent cocoa from Rainforest Alliance Certified farms. Kraft declared they would roll out the certified Côte d'Or range to consumers in the United Kingdom, Germany, Spain, Hungary, Poland, Portugal, the Netherlands, Canada and the United States. Kraft Foods also planned to use cocoa beans from Rainforest Alliance Certified farms only across its entire Côte d'Or and Marabou lines, representing some 30,000 tonnes of beans, by the end of 2012.
