= Ghent International Exposition (1913) =

World's fair held in Ghent, Belgium

1913 Ghent
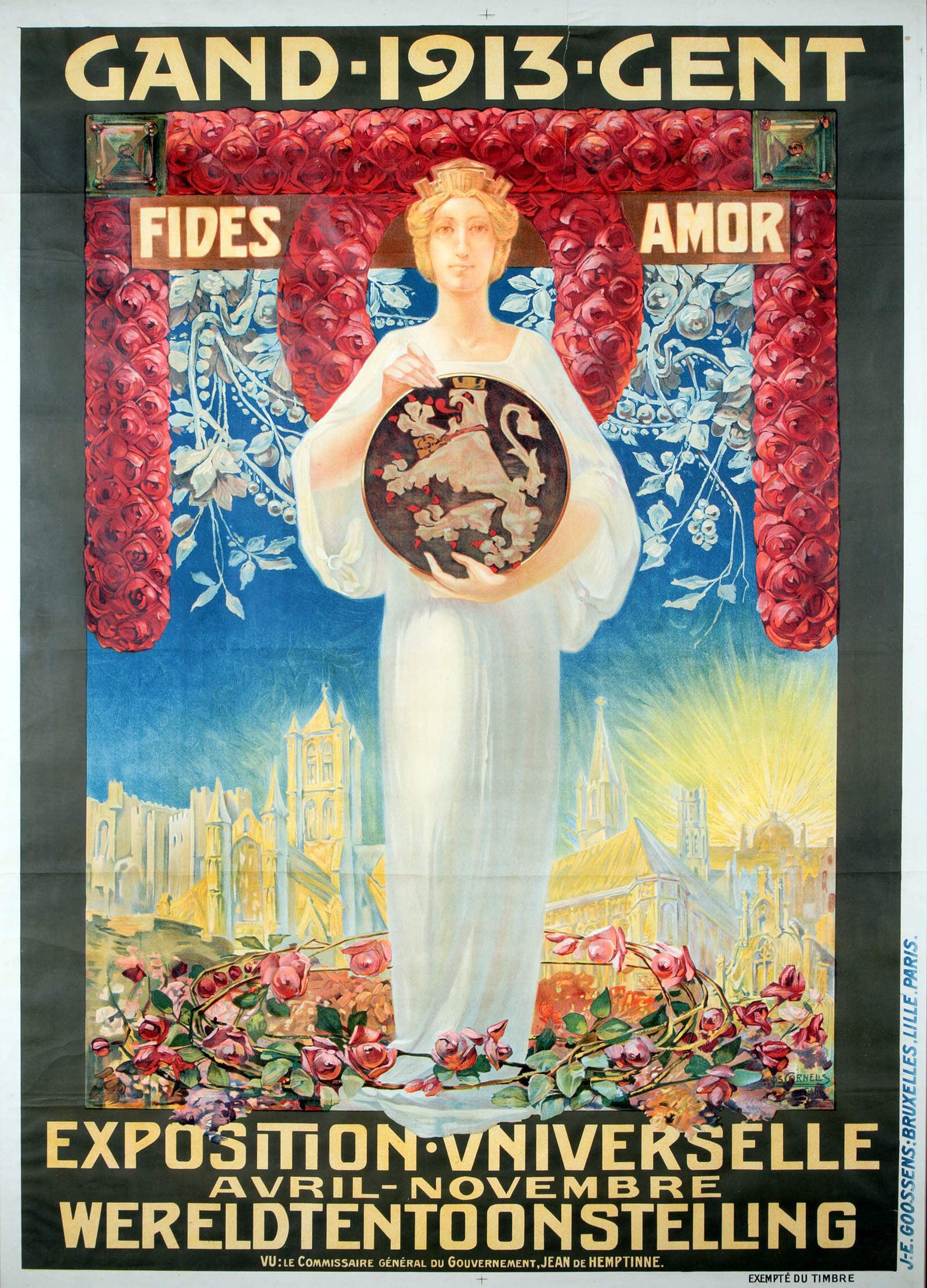
- Poster for the exhibition

Overview
- BIE-class: Universal exposition
- Category: Historical Expo
- Name: Exposition universelle et internationale de Gand
- Building(s): Gent-Sint-Pieters railway station
- Area: 130 hectares (320 acres)
- Organized by: Émile Coppieters

Participant(s)
- Countries: 31

Location
- Country: Belgium
- City: Ghent
- Venue: Citadelpark
- Coordinates: 51°02′16.4″N 3°43′12″E

Timeline
- Opening: 26 April 1913
- Closure: 3 November 1913

Universal expositions
- Previous: Esposizione internazionale dell'industria e del lavoro in Turin
- Next: Panama–Pacific International Exposition in San Francisco

Internet
- Website: http://www.expo1913.be/

The Ghent International Exposition (Dutch: Wereldtentoonstelling van Gent; French: Exposition universelle et internationale de Gand) of 1913 was a world's fair held in Ghent, Belgium, from 26 April to 3 November 1913.

== History ==
A number of buildings were completed for the occasion. Notably, Gent-Sint-Pieters railway station was completed in 1912 in time for the exposition, and was situated opposite the new hotel, Flandria Palace. A park, Citadelpark, was redesigned for the fair. The exposition was held on an area of 130 hectares (320 acres), which was larger than Expo 58 in Brussels. Various Belgian cities had a pavilion and an artificial town, called "Oud Vlaenderen" (Old Flanders) was created.

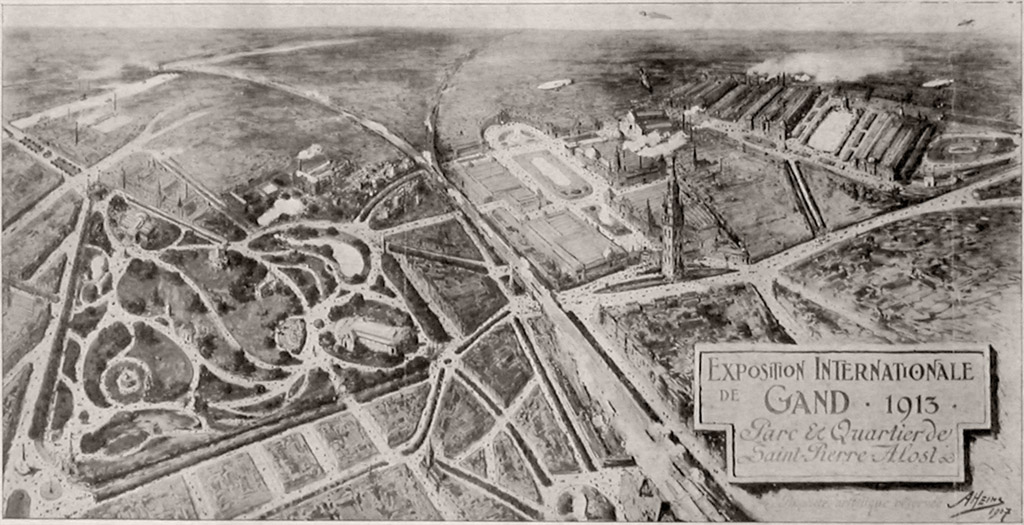
Panorama of the exposition of 1913 by Armand Heins

The four sons of Aymon statue, depicting Reinout, Adelaert, Ritsaert and Writsaert on their horse, Beyaert, was erected on the central approach avenue to the exposition.

In preparation for the exhibition, renovations were made in the centre of Ghent, including a large number of houses on the Graslei. Some years before, the neo-gothic St Michael's Bridge had been built to provide visitors to the exhibition with a vantage point to view the town, the post office and the Korenmarkt (Cornmarket) had been built, and the carved heads now arrayed around it represented the rulers who attended the exhibition (including Florence Nightingale). The construction of the exhibition was controversial and ended on the eve of World War I with serious debts.

During the fair, an international conference on urban planning was held, organised by Paul Saintenoy, Emile Vinck, and Paul Otlet.

Belgium's first aerial postage service was operated from 1 May to 25 August by Henri Crombez during the exposition.

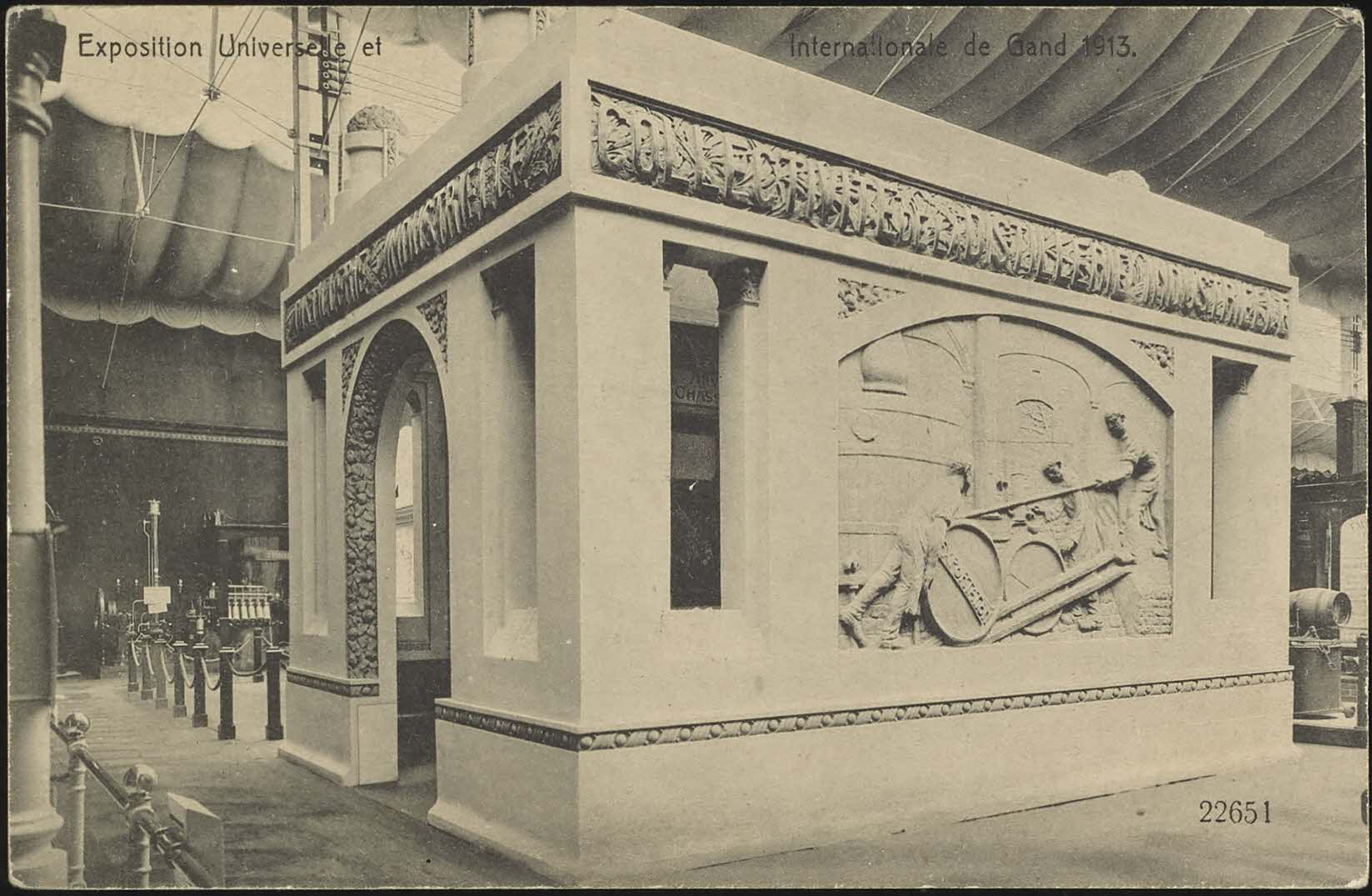
Postcard 'Exposition Universelle et Internationale de Gand 1913, Collectivité de la Distillerie Industrielle Belge', 1913

Greek confectionery maker Leonidas Kestekides attended the fair, and then settled permanently in Belgium and founded the Leonidas chocolate company.

In the last of such type of human zoo stagings, part of a group of 53 Igorot tribesmen from Bontoc, Mountain Province, 28-year-old Filipino Timicheg was "displayed" and died here of tuberculosis or flu. A tunnel in the Gent-Sint-Pieters railway station renovation project is named after him.

== Participants ==
The participating nations included: Algeria, Austria, Canada, the Congo, Denmark, France, Germany, Italy, Japan, Morocco, the Netherlands, Persia, Russia, Spain, Switzerland, Tunisia and the United States

== See also ==
- Belgian general strike of 1913 (14-24 April 1913)
