= Leonidas (chocolate maker) =

Belgian chocolate maker

Confiserie Leonidas S.A.
- Trade name: Leonidas
- Type: Société anonyme (public limited)
- Industry: Confectionery manufacturing
- Founded: 1913
- Founder: Leonidas Kestekides
- Headquarters: Boulevard Jules Graindor 41–43, 1070 Anderlecht, Belgium
- Number of locations: 1,030 points of sale (2019)
- Key people: P. de Selliers de Moranville (CEO)
- Revenue: ▲US$107 million (2018); US$66 million (2009)
- Net income: US$6.08 million (2018)
- Number of employees: 347 (2018)
- Website: leonidas.com

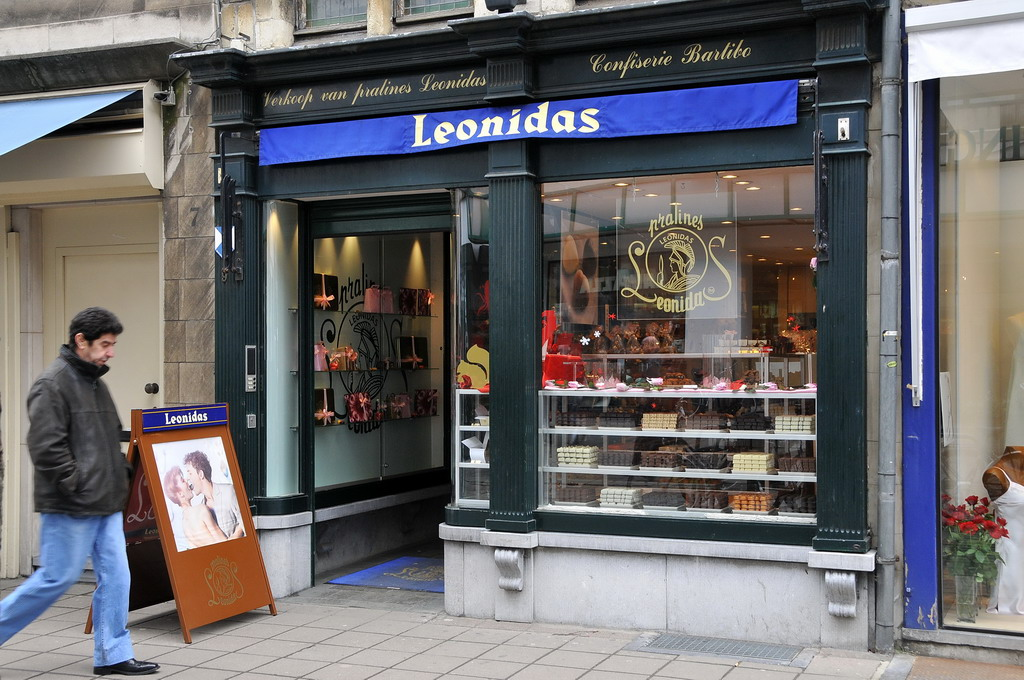
Leonidas shop in The Hague

Leonidas is a registered trademark of the agri-food company Confiserie Leonidas S.A. The Belgian chocolate company was founded in 1913 by Leonidas Kestekides. The company is ISO 9001 and FSSC 22000 certified. As of 2019, the brand has more than 1,030 points of sale (including 450 stores in Belgium and Luxembourg, and 290 in France) in 32 countries, the majority of which are franchises and around 40 are subsidiaries.

== History ==
Born in 1882 in Niğde, Turkey, Leonidas Georges Kestekides of Greek heritage made a living by selling 'granitas', a kind of sorbet, and other sweets alongside his brother, Avraam. In 1900, he decided to move to the United States. In 1910, Leonidas met Joanna Emelia Teerlinck. Together, they moved to Ghent, where the International Exhibition was held in 1913. There, he won the gold medal and opened his first tearoom at 34 Veldstraat.

In 1935, after being accused by the police of street trading, he was ordered to sell his products in a store. As a result, he rented a room in a building at 58 Boulevard Anspach in Brussels. In 1937, he officially registered his brand with the City of Brussels. The brand's font and logo were chosen by Basilio Kestekides in honor of his uncle's Greek roots. He used the effigy of the King of Sparta, Leonidas I, who died in the Battle of Thermopylae during his opposition to the Second Persian invasion of Greece.

Leonidas's chocolates are made without palm oil. They are made with Belgian chocolate and cocoa butter. Leonidas's principal chocolate is "manon". At the time, the manon, filled with butter cream on a nougatine base, was dipped in melted sugar using a fork. A few years later, he placed the buttercream on a white chocolate praliné base instead of a nougatine base. Alexandros, nephew of Leonidas, built the company's first machines in the 1950s.

On 15 November 2013, the company became a certified purveyor to the Belgian royal household.
