= Guylian =

Belgian chocolate manufacturer

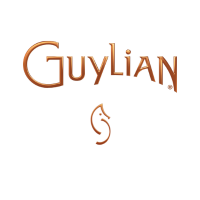
- Type: Subsidiary
- Industry: Confectionery production
- Founded: Sint-Niklaas, Belgium; 1958 (68 years ago)
- Founder: Guy Foubert
- Headquarters: Sint-Niklaas, Belgium
- Products: Chocolates
- Number of employees: 200
- Parent: Lotte Confectionery
- Website: guylian.com

Guylian (/ˈɡiːliən/, French: [ɡiljɑ̃]) is a Belgian chocolate brand and manufacturer best known for its seashell shaped pralines. The company was founded in 1958 in Sint-Niklaas, Belgium by Guy Foubert and is now owned by the South Korean company Lotte Confectionery.

Foubert and his wife formulated the original chocolate recipe and "Guylian" was formed as a portmanteau from the first names of Guy and Liliane Foubert. While Guylian specialise in roasted hazelnut pralines they produce a wide variety of products including chocolate covered fruit pieces and chocolate truffles.

The company headquarters remain in Sint-Niklaas along with their production plant but now Guylian exports internationally to approximately 120 countries. In 2003, the first Guylian Belgian Chocolate café was opened in Antwerp, Belgium; there are now 9 franchises in different locations around the world.

Guylian donates to and works with Project Seahorse to help with marine wildlife conservation and raise awareness for the charity. They have also worked with the Cocoa Horizons Foundations on Project Cocoa to sustainably source cocoa and have aimed to reduce any negative environmental impacts from their production. For this work, they have received Corporate Responsibility Awards along with multiple other awards for innovation and their chocolates.

== History ==
Foubert was born in 1938 in Sint-Niklaas where 20 years later, he would establish the company. His father was a baker and while Foubert was still at school, he began selling hand-made truffles at local markets using skills learnt at the Antwerp School of Confectionery and Patisserie in Belgium. In 1958, Foubert got married and perfected his recipe, then began producing his chocolate Sea Shells on a larger scale and in 1960 established the brand name Guylian. Guylian is an amalgamation of Foubert and his wife Lilian's names to signify their “love and passion” as a couple and for their business craft.

A new factory was built in 1988 in Sint-Niklaas to manage the company's growth and increase production.

In 2003, Guylian expanded into the Café industry with its opening of a Guylian Belgian Chocolate Café in Antwerp, Belgium. Between 2008 and 2011, Guylian opened three cafés in Sydney, Australia.

Lotte is a South Korean confectionery manufacturer and the current owner of Guylian. Lotte Confectionery purchased Guylian in June 2008 for €105 million to enter into the European premium chocolate market.

They also expected to increase Guylian's presence in Asia and soon expanded their chocolate café locations to include Dubai and Seoul, Korea.

The partnership did increase Guylian's brand awareness in Asia but in 2014 rising commodity prices put a strain on growth as increased sugar prices meant higher production costs for Guylian.

Significant investments were made in 2016 to increase the capacity of the production plant in Sint-Niklaas, Belgium. A new production line was built for Guylian's premium Belgian Master's Selection in 2017 and they have made further investments into another new production line for chocolate bars.

=== Awards ===
In 1998, the then crown prince Philippe of Belgium awarded Guylian with Belgium's highest export award and today 60% of sales are from exports outside of Europe.

In 2012, the International Taste and Quality Institute gave Guylian's Sea Shells and Sea Horse pralines a score of 90% with their taste experts judging based on their impression, appearance, smell, texture and taste. They were also awarded the Superior Taste Award and are one of few brands to receive three gold stars for their products.

The Royal Belgian Committee for Distribution awarded Guylian two awards in 2015, a Corporate Social Responsibility award for their commitment to charity work and an award for innovation. Also in 2015, the Crunch Biscuit filled Sea Horse was released and won the Golden Archer Award for innovation and creativity.

In 2017, Guylian's new chocolate covered fruits won a Superior Taste Award and the Blueberries were awarded three gold stars while the Raisins and Cranberries received two stars.

Guylian won another Corporate Social Responsibility Award in 2019 for its charitable contributions to Project Seahorse, it was awarded by the Tax-Free World Association at their awards night in Cannes.

In 2018, the 7th biennial Seahorses of the World Photo Competition was held and sponsored by Guylian. It promotes seahorse conservation and allows divers to win awards for their submission of underwater images of Seahorses which are then used by Project Seahorse for scientific research.

=== Guinness World Record ===
The Guinness World Record for the largest chocolate Easter egg sculpture was awarded to Guylian in March 2005. In celebration of Easter traditions and the renovation of Sint-Niklaas market square the record-breaking egg was constructed with support from metal scaffolding and wooden panels. Twenty-six Guylian chocolatiers built the egg over eight days using around 50,000 Seashell Bars worth of Guylian chocolate totalling 1,950 kilograms (4,300 lb). The sculpture reached 8.32 metres (27.3 ft) tall and 6.39 metres (21.0 ft) wide and held the record until 2011 when a 10 metres (33 ft) tall egg was built in Italy.

== Products ==
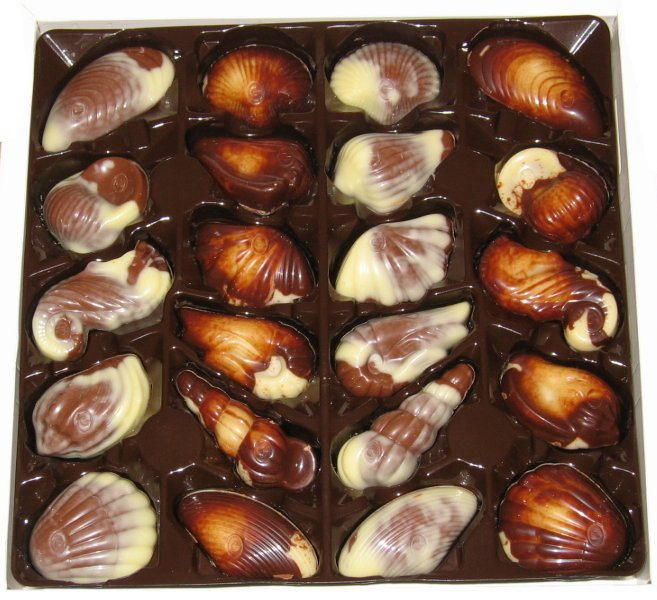
Guylian sea shell chocolates

Guylian's main product is a range of praline chocolates in the shape of seashells and seahorses.

In 2005, Guylian released twist wrap boxed chocolates for sale in the United Kingdom to explore the market of everyday consumption rather than gift confectionary. They were made available in their Original Hazelnut Praline flavour, Creamy Strawberry, Orange Cream, Smooth Truffle, Mild Cappuccino and Crispy Caramel.

Guylian released a vanilla flavour Sea Horse at the ISM confectionery exhibition in 2013 in an attempt to capture the market of customers who like “a more subtle taste to the traditional signature praline filling”. At this exhibition, the Perline chocolate was added to their assortment collection and contains a milk chocolate truffle and hazelnut praline centre.

To meet consumer requests for smaller portions, resealable pouches of chocolate-covered fruit pieces were released in 2016. These came as Milk Chocolate Coated Raisins, Dark Chocolate Coated Blueberries or Dark Chocolate Coated Cranberries. Their assortment flavours at this time included white chocolate Matcha Green Tea, Latte Macchiato coffee, Crunchy Biscuit and Soft Caramel.

In 2017, Guylian launched a duty-free exclusive range of mini pralines for its master's Selection luxury gift box. Traditional flavours were accompanied by new flavours including Coffee Cardamom, Caramel with Pineapple, Orange and berries, Earl Grey Tea and Ginger Lime. The previously successful flavours that appeared in this collection were the signature Hazelnut Praline, Raspberry, Crunch Hazelnut Praline, Almond Praline and Mocha. The box contained an assortment of 10 different flavoured miniature chocolates decorated with fine ingredients.

Guylian introduced ‘No Sugar Added Bars’ which come in milk, dark or dark with cranberries and get their sweetness from Maltitol, a natural sugar alternative. Guylian's Golden Gift Boxes are available in two sizes; 250g or 375g and are filled with roasted hazelnut praline Sea Shells.

=== Production method ===
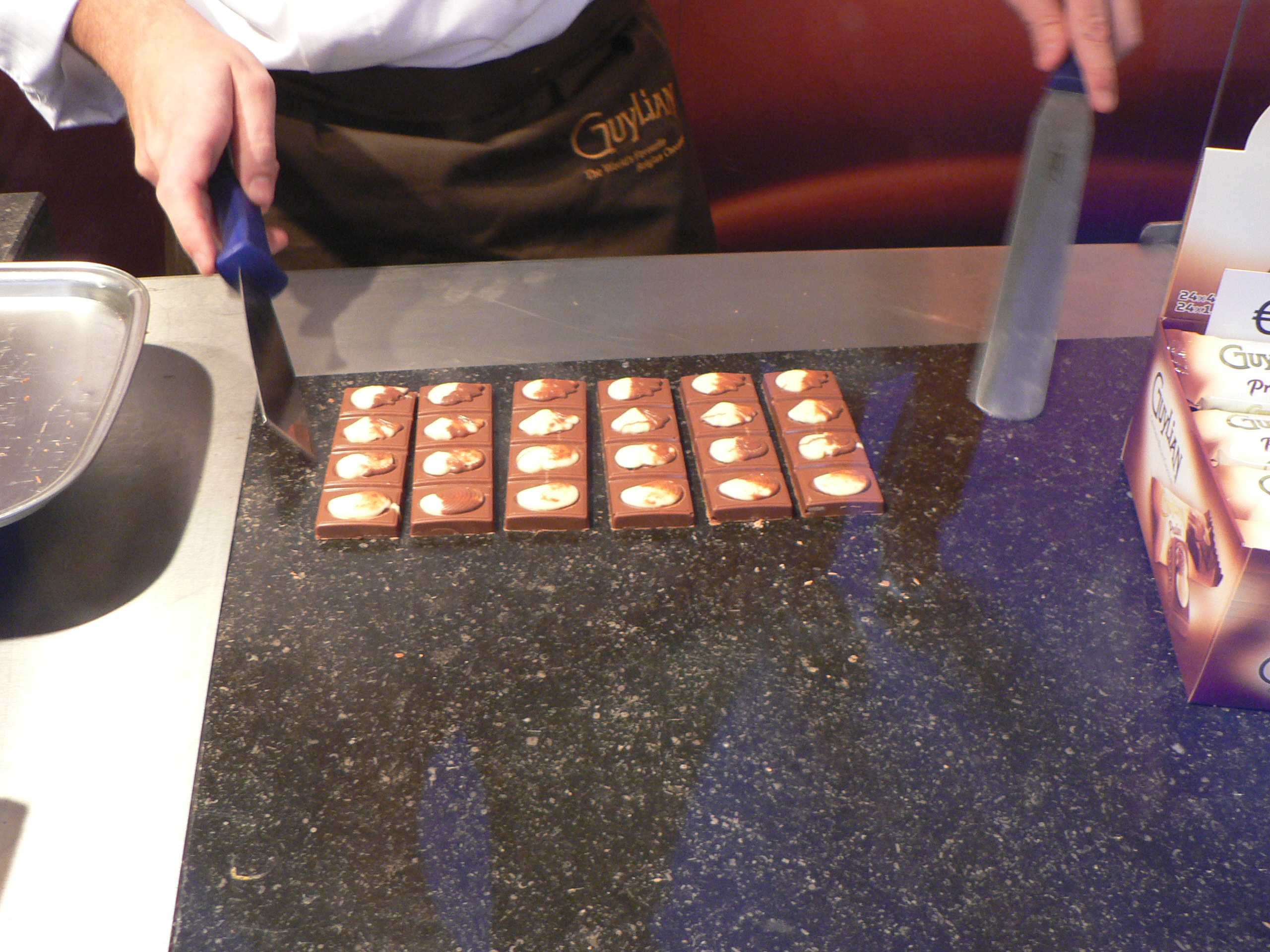
The making of Guylian praliné chocolate bars

The Guylian Sint-Niklaas production facility produces up to 75 tons of chocolates each day and still use Foubert's original recipe to make the Guylian hazelnut praline filling. Sustainably sourced West African cocoa beans are used to make 100% pure cocoa butter which gives Guylian's chocolate a creamy texture. In small batches Mediterranean hazelnuts are slowly roasted in copper kettles with sugar while chocolatiers monitor the temperature and observe their caramelisation. The roasted hazelnuts are then ground and blended with the cocoa butter to produce the roast hazelnut praline which is then piped into the chocolate shells.

Foubert's wife also contributed to the creation of their chocolates by designing their look, Liliane created the sculptured seashell and seahorse shapes and furnished their shiny marble finish. Guylian's Stephen Candries comments, “The white and dark chocolate unique intertwining like the lives of the two lovers, an immortal tale of romance that is retold in every marbled seashell today.”

Guylian G-Stamp

== Company icon ==
A seahorse is used as the company's icon although the chocolate seahorses tail curls the opposite way to real seahorses. Every Guylian Sea Shell features the "G stamp", a marking with the letter G to indicate that the product is made by Guylian. Export and Travel-Retail director of Guylian, Steven Candries explains “You can distinguish a true Guylian Sea Shell chocolate by the G-stamp it bears. This is our quality signature and the mark of an artist.”

== Operations ==
=== Offices ===
Although Guylian is now a subsidiary of a South Korean company the head office remains where it was founded in Sint-Niklaas, Belgium. Subsidiary offices are situated globally with the United States Guylian office located in New Jersey, another in Krefeld, Germany, one in Oxford, United Kingdom, in Portugal and in 2018 Guylian Asia was set up in Hong Kong. In 2010, Guylian participated in the World Expo in China which raised brand awareness and a Guylian representative office existed in Shanghai but was closed in 2014.

=== Production Site ===
Guylian was founded in Sint-Niklaas and seeks to ensure their production continues to be done in Belgium. They repeatedly invest in their Sint-Niklaas production site to meet their output requirements and new products. In 2016, Lotte financed a new factory location and production line in Sint-Niklaas for €6.8 million with aims to complete updates by mid-2017.

== Guylian Belgian Chocolate Cafés ==
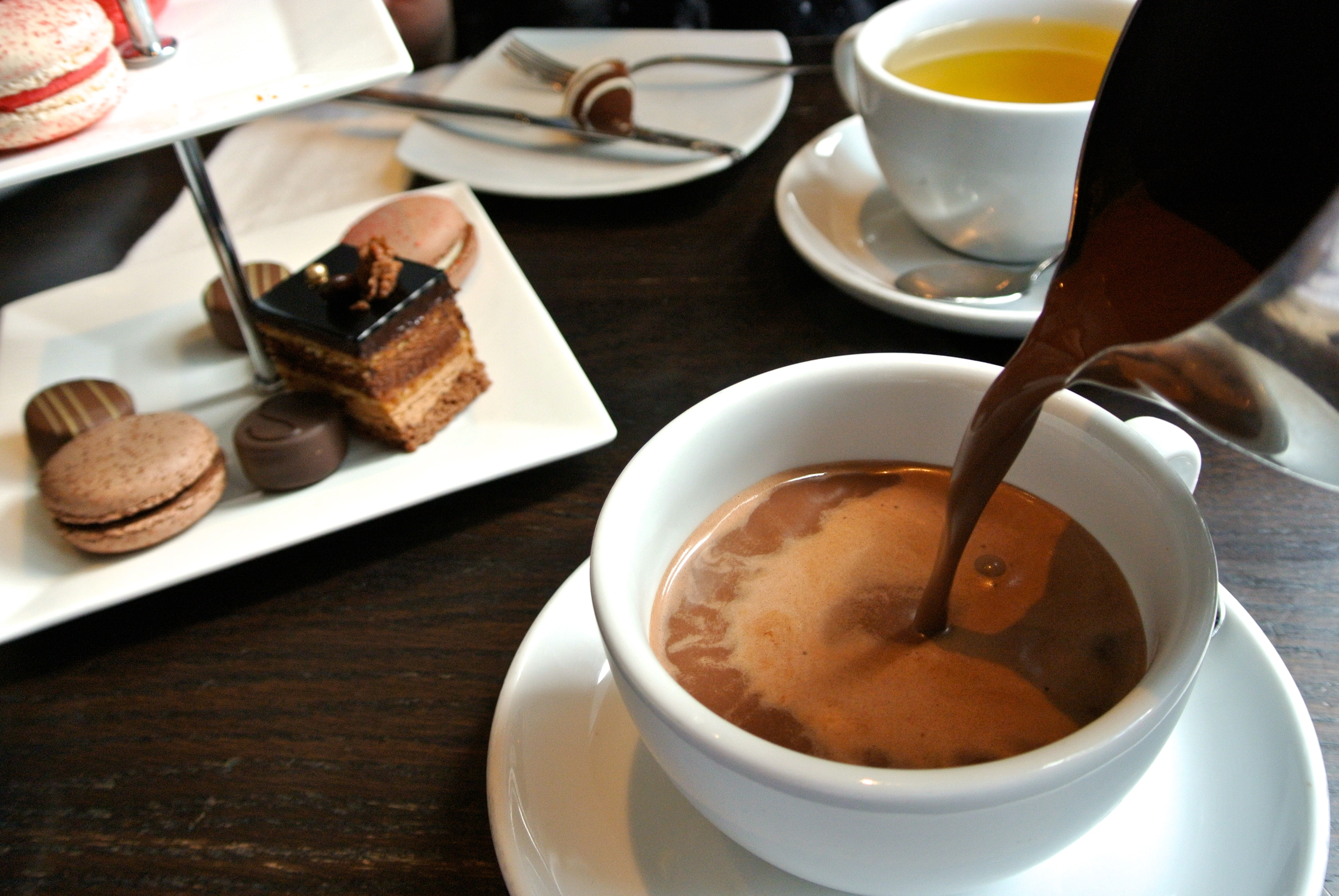
Guylian Belgian Chocolate Cafe Hot chocolate

Guylian expanded their café concept internationally in 2008 when an outlet was opened in Sydney, Australia. Following the cafe's success, two more Guylian Belgian Chocolate cafes were set up in Sydney by 2011. In 2015, the first Middle East café opened in Abu Dhabi and plans were made to multiply the number of outlets in both countries.

In Australia the aim was to have a café in every state and increase to 30 cafes Australia-wide; Guylian believed it would lift the brands profile and boost their sales in supermarkets. In 2018, the first Guylian Café was opened in Dubai and soon after two more were developed. By the end of 2020 Guylian intends to have three more stores in the United Arab Emirates.

Lotte Confectionery has a Guylian Café in their department store in Seoul, South Korea and there is another outlet in the Lotte Duty Free Star Lounge. Located in Myeong-dong, this café is VIP and has unique menus developed by three Michelin-starred Belgian chef Peter Goossens.

== Charity Partnerships ==
=== Project Seahorse ===
Since 1998, Guylian have been a major sponsor of the Project Seahorse marine conservation group and over this time have reportedly donated more than €1.75 million to marine conservation efforts. Project Seahorse is an international organisation from Vancouver and London that looks after marine ecosystems and finds solutions to conservation issues affecting wild seahorses. Guylian raise awareness for Project Seahorse's efforts through posts on their social media, messages on their website and a conservation message printed on the back of every box of their chocolates. They have also run outreach activities to raise awareness such as school education programs and seahorse photo competitions. The Guylian Seahorses of the World Photo Competition is held every two years to gather and judge pictures and videos of wild seahorses from all over the world. The submissions are added to the iSeahorse platform database and are used for scientific research and education programs to improve understanding of seahorses and their habitats by analysing the worldwide distribution of seahorse species. The iSeahorse and app website allows anyone to share images of wild seahorses for science and to better understand the threats seahorses face and help protect them. Together with Guylian, Project Seahorse have helped to limit exportation of seahorses and protect threatened reefs in Hong Kong and the Philippines and for their efforts won a Corporate Social Responsibility Award in 2019.

=== Cocoa Horizons Foundations (Project Cocoa) ===
Guylian work with the Barry Callebaut Cocoa Horizons foundation which is an independent not for profit group with aims to improve cocoa farmers working conditions and increase the sustainability of cocoa cultivation. Together they work on Project Cocoa to develop communities and protect the environment by introducing entrepreneurial farming.

In 2018, Guylian removed palm oil from their products and replaced it with sunflower oil and shea butter. This resulted in more sustainable chocolates which contained less sugar and saturated fat and aligned with their goals to become the leading Palm oil Free Belgian Chocolate brand. They also aim to have 100% of their cocoa sustainably sourced by 2025.
