= Meurisse =

Meurisse is a surname. Notable people with the surname include:

- Catherine Meurisse (born 1980), French cartoonist
- Jacky Meurisse (born 1965), Belgian musician
- Nina Meurisse (born 1988), French actress
- Paul Meurisse (1912–1979), French actor
- Xandro Meurisse (born 1992), Belgian cyclist
