= Ballotin =

Small cardboard box containing pralines

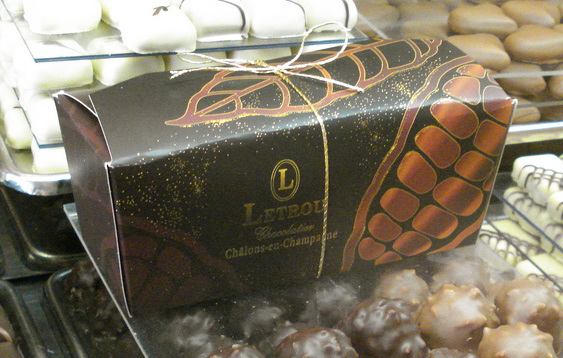
Ballotin

A ballotin is a cardboard box that is traditionally used to package the Belgian praline confections. When Jean Neuhaus created the first pralines in 1912, he opted for simple packaging (as opposed to the elaborate boxes favored at the time by Cadbury's). The paper cones that were used originally caused damage to the delicate sweets, so Jean's wife, ballerina Louise Agostini, invented a one-piece cardboard box that was folded by hand and tied with a decorative ribbon, the bolduc.

Jean Neuhaus filed a registration for the invention on 16 August 1915. Fellow members of the Royal Master Confectioners Association of Belgium asked him not to make the design exclusive, Neuhauses obliged, and the ballotin was never patented.

The elegant boxes, made in multiple sizes, became closely associated with Belgium, and, although being flimsy, with the chocolates of superior quality, owing in part to the "hand-crafted" feel of the box as opposed to hinged tin boxes used for mass-produced inferior confections. Mort Rosenblum calls this "a brilliant stroke of marketing" that allows to sell Belgian chocolates even of lower quality at a premium, as long as they are packaged right.

== Sources ==
- Mercier, Jacques (2008). The Temptation of Chocolate. Lannoo Uitgeverij. ISBN 978-2-87386-533-7.
- Moss, Sarah; Badenoch, Alexander (2009). Chocolate: A Global History (1st ed.). London: Reaktion Books. ISBN 978-1-86189-524-0.
- Rosenblum, M. (2006). Chocolate: A Bittersweet Saga of Dark and Light. Farrar, Straus and Giroux. ISBN 978-1-4299-2831-1.
