= Praline (nut confection) =

Confection made with nuts

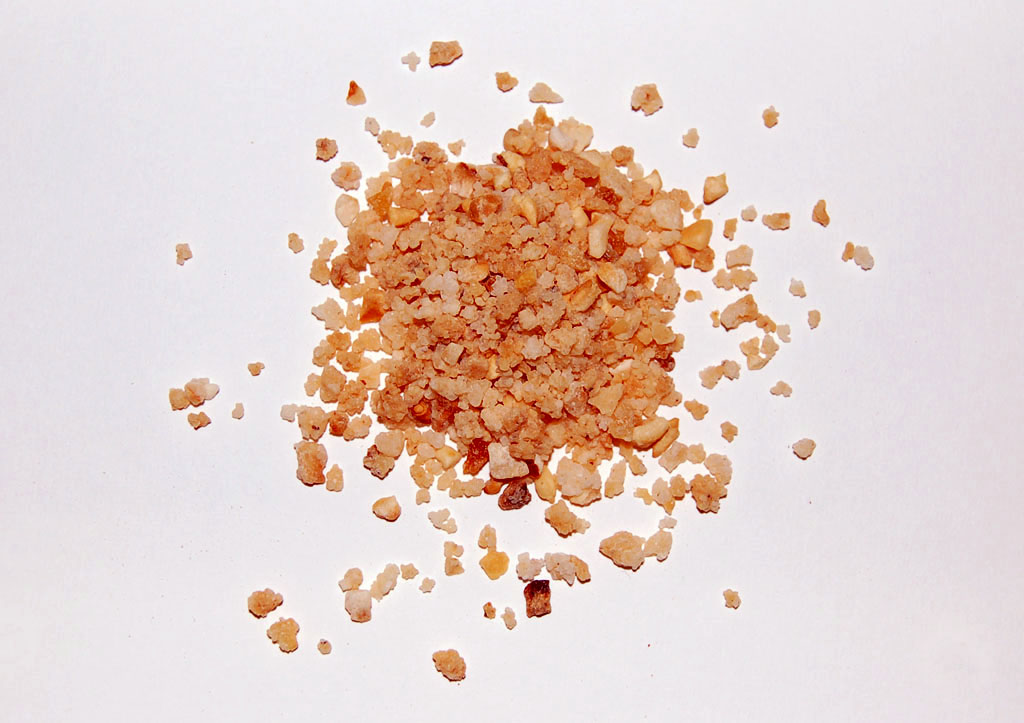
- Pralin (crushed praline)
- Type: Confectionery
- Place of origin: Belgium and France
- Main ingredients: nuts, syrup
- Variations: European, American

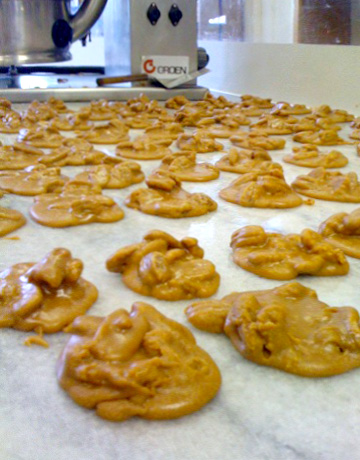
American pralines cooling on a marble slab. Unlike European pralines, American pralines are made with cream.

Pralines (US: /ˈpreɪliːn/; New Orleans, Cajun, and UK: /ˈprɑːliːn/) are confections containing nuts – usually almonds, pecans and hazelnuts – and sugar. Cream is a common third ingredient.

There are two main types:

- French pralines, a firm combination of almonds or hazelnuts, and caramelized sugar
- American pralines, a softer, creamier combination of syrup and pecans, hazelnuts or almonds with milk or cream, resembling fudge

A praline cookie is a chocolate cookie containing ground nuts. Praline is usually used as a filling in chocolates or other sweets.

== Varieties ==
=== European nut pralines ===
Praline may have originally been inspired in France by the cook of Marshal du Plessis-Praslin (1602–1675), with the word praline deriving from the name Praslin. Early pralines were whole almonds individually coated in caramelized sugar, as opposed to dark nougat, where a sheet of caramelized sugar covers many nuts. Though European colonization of the Western Hemisphere was already underway, chocolate-producing cocoa from there was originally not associated with the term. The European chefs used local nuts such as almonds and hazelnuts.

The crunchy powder made by coarsely grinding up such caramel-coated nuts is called pralin, and is an ingredient in many cakes, pastries, and ice creams. After this powder has been finely ground, it becomes praliné in French, which is similar to nut butter. This paste can then be blended with and flavoured with any type of chocolate. When coated in (couverture) chocolate, it becomes chocolat praliné. The word praliné is used colloquially in France and Switzerland to refer to these various chocolate-coated mixes ("chocolates" in English). In mainland Europe, the word praline is often used to mean either this nut powder or the chocolate paste made from it, which is widely used to fill chocolates, hence its use in Germany, the Netherlands and Belgium to refer to filled chocolates in general. In the United Kingdom, the term can refer either to praline (the filling for chocolates) or, less commonly, to the original whole-nut pralines.

=== American cream-based pralines ===
French settlers brought the recipe to Louisiana, where both sugar cane and pecan trees were plentiful. In 19th century New Orleans, people began substituting pecans for almonds, added cream to thicken the confection, and thus created what became known throughout the American South as the praline.

Pralines have a creamy consistency, similar to fudge. They are usually made by combining sugar (often brown), butter, cream or buttermilk, and pecans in a pot over medium-high heat, and stirring constantly until most of the water has evaporated and it has reached a thick texture with a brown color. This is then usually dropped by spoonfuls onto wax paper or a sheet of aluminum foil greased with butter, and left to cool.

"Pralines and Cream" is a common ice cream flavor in the United States and Canada. In New Orleans, Acadiana, and Baton Rouge, Louisiana, pralines are sometimes called "pecan candy".

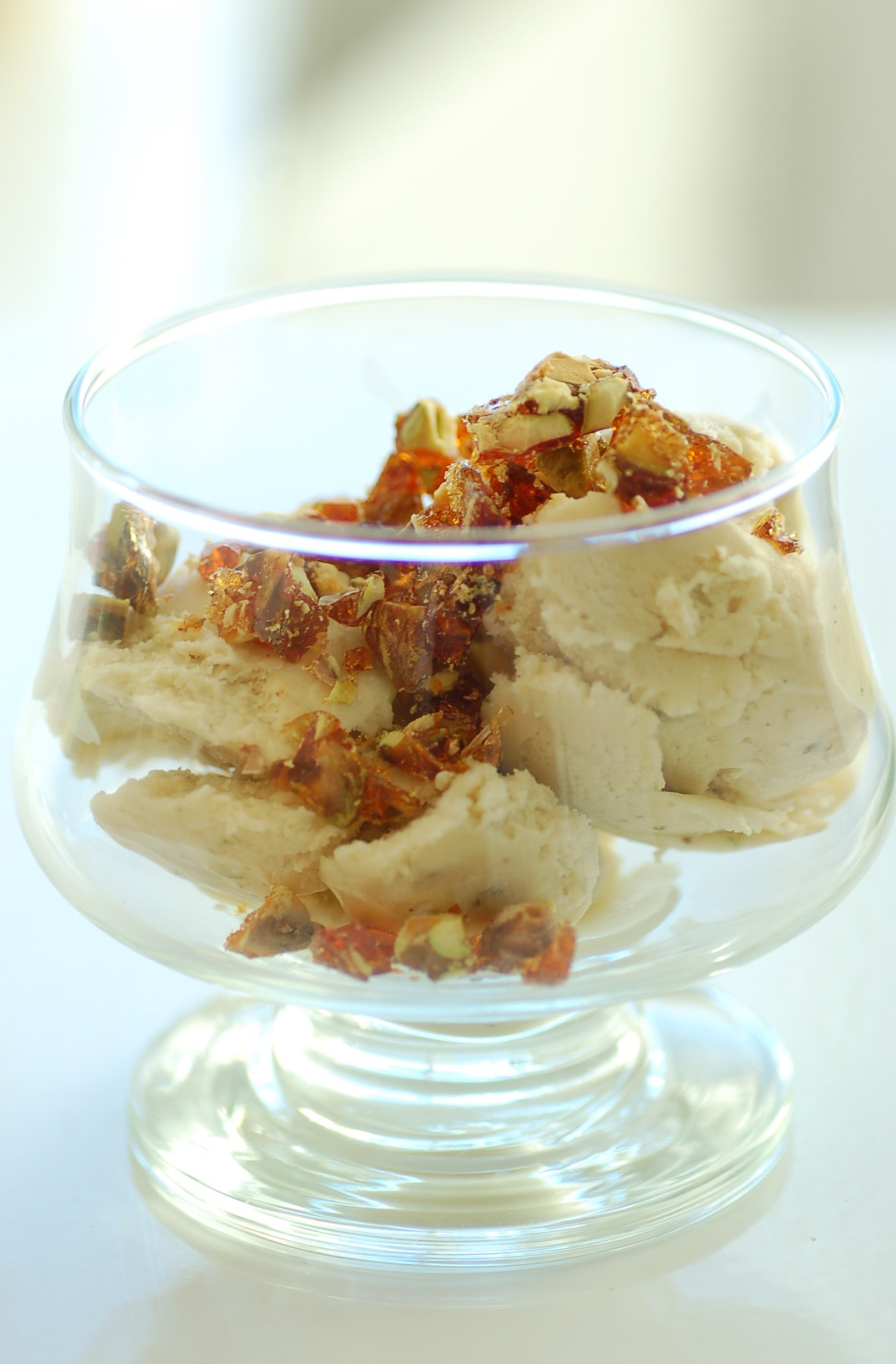
Fresh fig ice cream with pistachio praline

== See also ==
- List of cookies
- List of desserts
