= Chocolate praline =

Chocolate shell with a soft filling

Praline
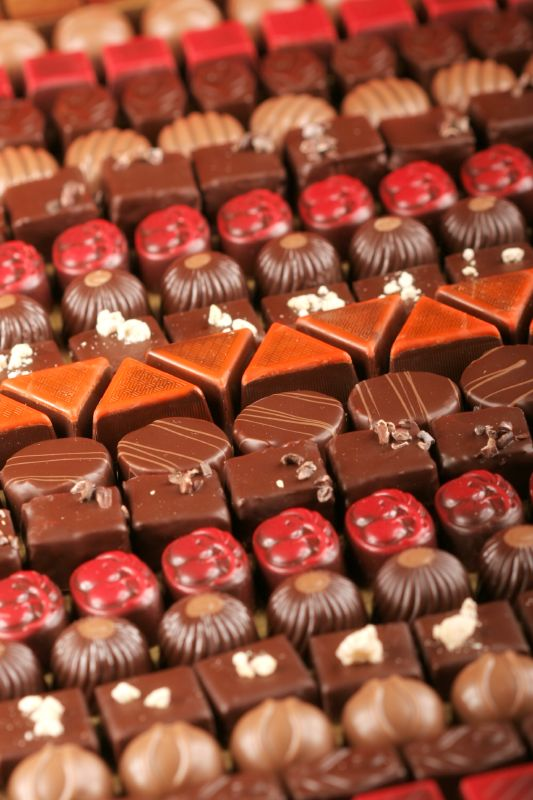
- Artisan pralines
- Type: Confectionery
- Place of origin: Belgium
- Main ingredients: Chocolate

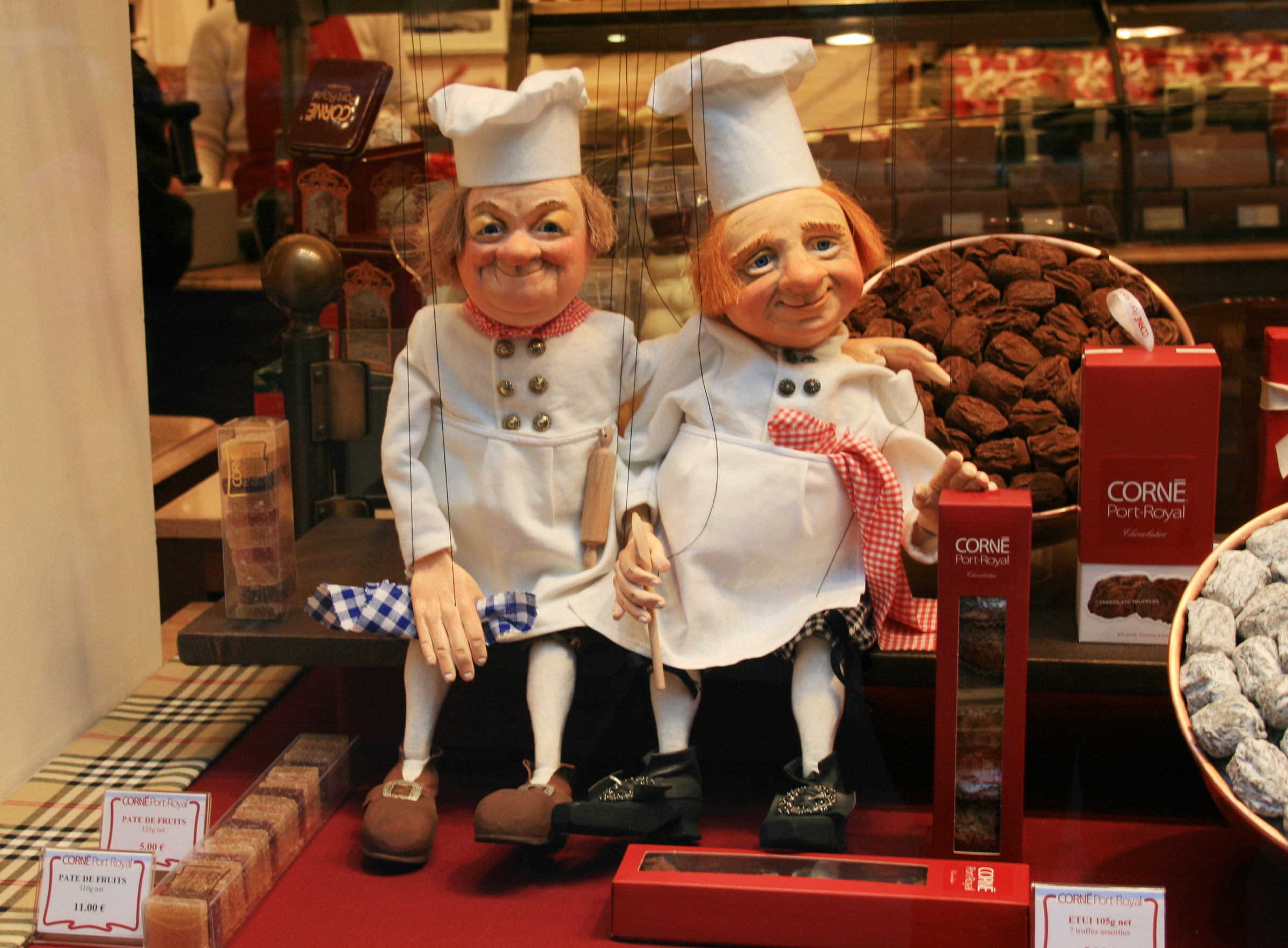
Praline shop in Brussels. Such luxury shops typically also sell chocolate truffles.

A praline (/ˈprɑːliːn/ PRAH-leen), also known as Belgian chocolate, Belgian chocolate fondant or chocolate bonbon, is a hollow casing of chocolate with a soft filling, often consisting of hazelnuts or almonds.

Historically, chocolats pralinés or pralines de chocolat referred to simple confections coated in chocolate. As chocolate consumption increased, these became popular by the mid-19th century. (Note: These were, for instance, mentioned in Balzac's Cousin Bette (1846): Il m’apporte des bonbons, des pralines ! Oh ! que c’est bon, le chocolat praliné !.. Je fais tout ce qu'il veut pour un sac de ce chocolat !) The term derives from praline, originally a type of candied almonds, whole or crushed. In addition to the traditional almond praline, crushed and coated in chocolate, another popular variety was the chocolate-coated fondant cream. Jean Neuhaus II, a Belgian chocolatier, is generally credited with introducing the modern praline in 1912 — that is, a moulded chocolate with a filled centre.

There have always been many types and shapes, nearly always containing a chocolate shell, usually couverture chocolate, with a softer filling.

Belgian chocolates (pralines) have a great variety of fillings: praline or praliné (similar to the original nut confection, often finely ground), whole nuts, marzipan, salted caramel, coffee, a spirit, cream liqueur, cherry or a chocolate blend that contrasts with the outer shell. They are often sold in stylised boxes in the form of a gift box. The largest manufacturers are Neuhaus, Godiva, Leonidas, and Guylian.

Contrary to truffles, pralines are often decorated.

== See also ==
- Bonbon, a similar chocolate confectionery
