= Paul (bakery) =

French bakery chain

Boulangeries Paul SAS
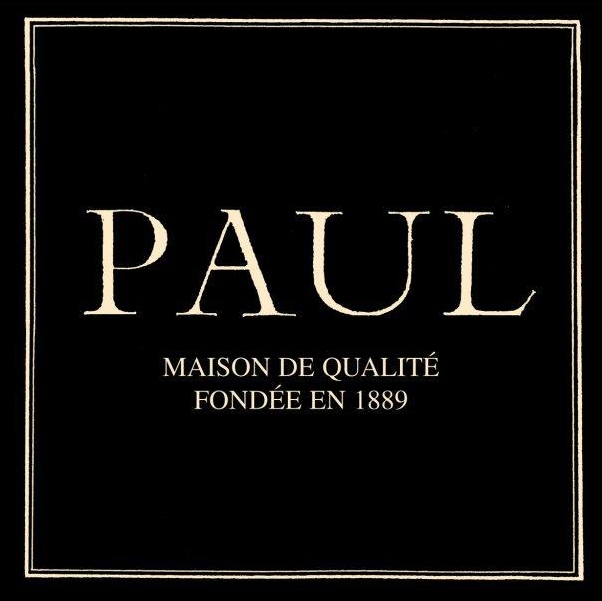
- Type: Private (SAS)
- Industry: Restaurants
- Genre: Fast casual/bakery-cafés
- Founded: 1889; 137 years ago
- Headquarters: Marcq-en-Barœul, France
- Number of locations: 750+ (424 in France)
- Key people: Charlemagne Mayot, founder
- Products: Breads, such as bagels, loaves, and muffins; cold sandwiches; hot panini; salads; soups; cakes; and pastries
- Parent: Groupe Holder
- Website: boulangeries-paul.com

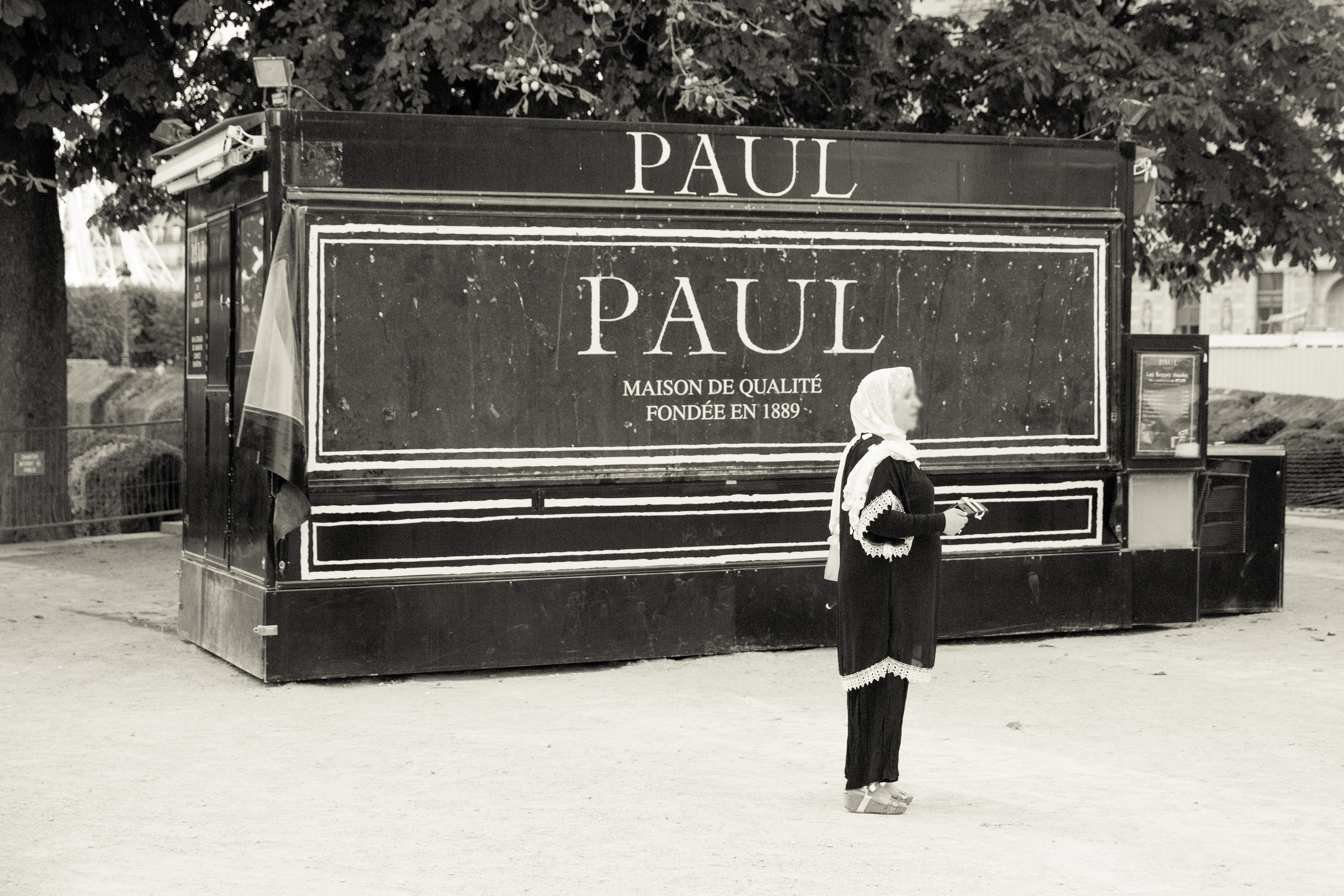
Paul at the Louvre Museum, Paris

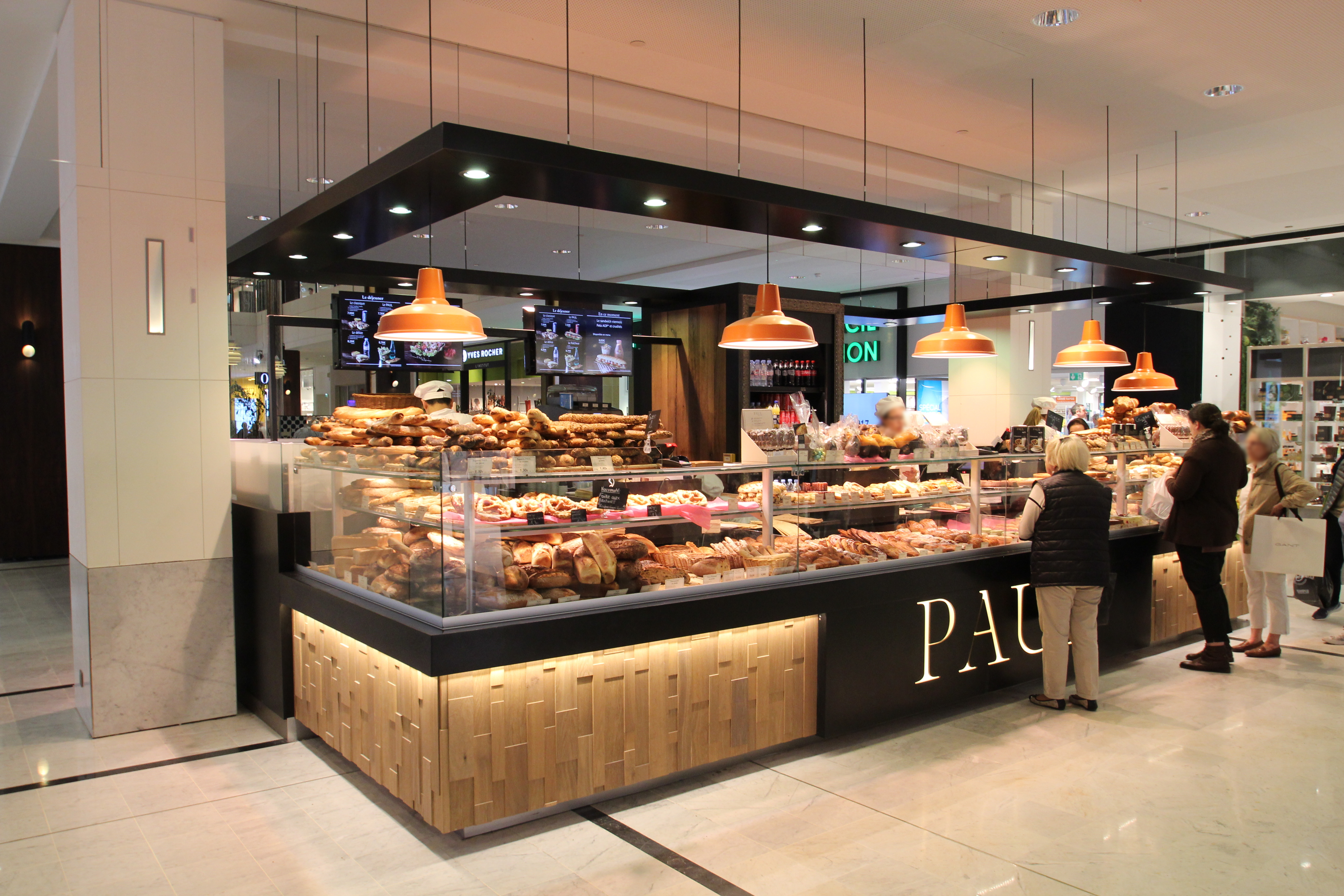
Paul inside a shopping center in Le Chesnay, France

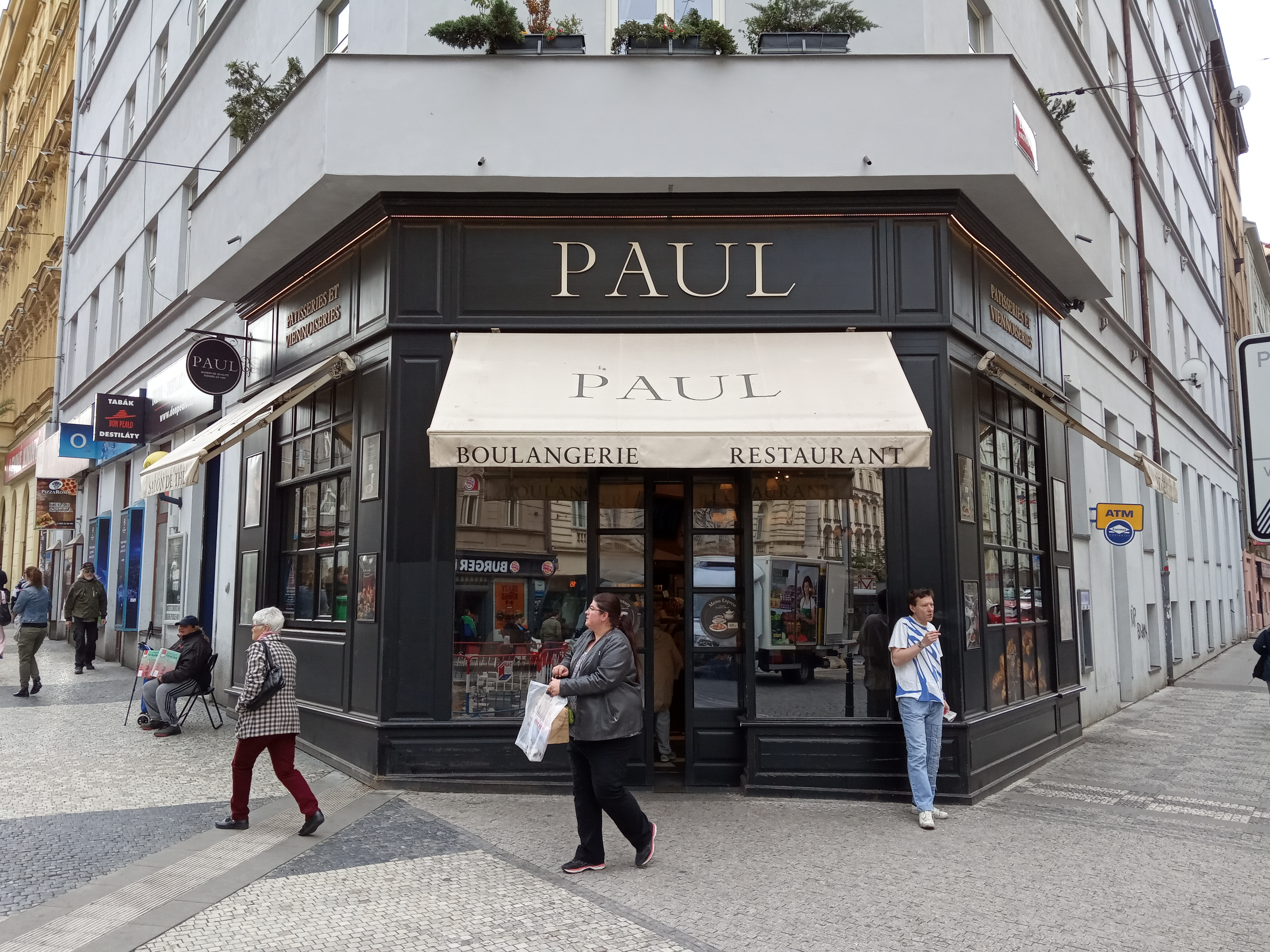
Paul in Prague, Czech Republic

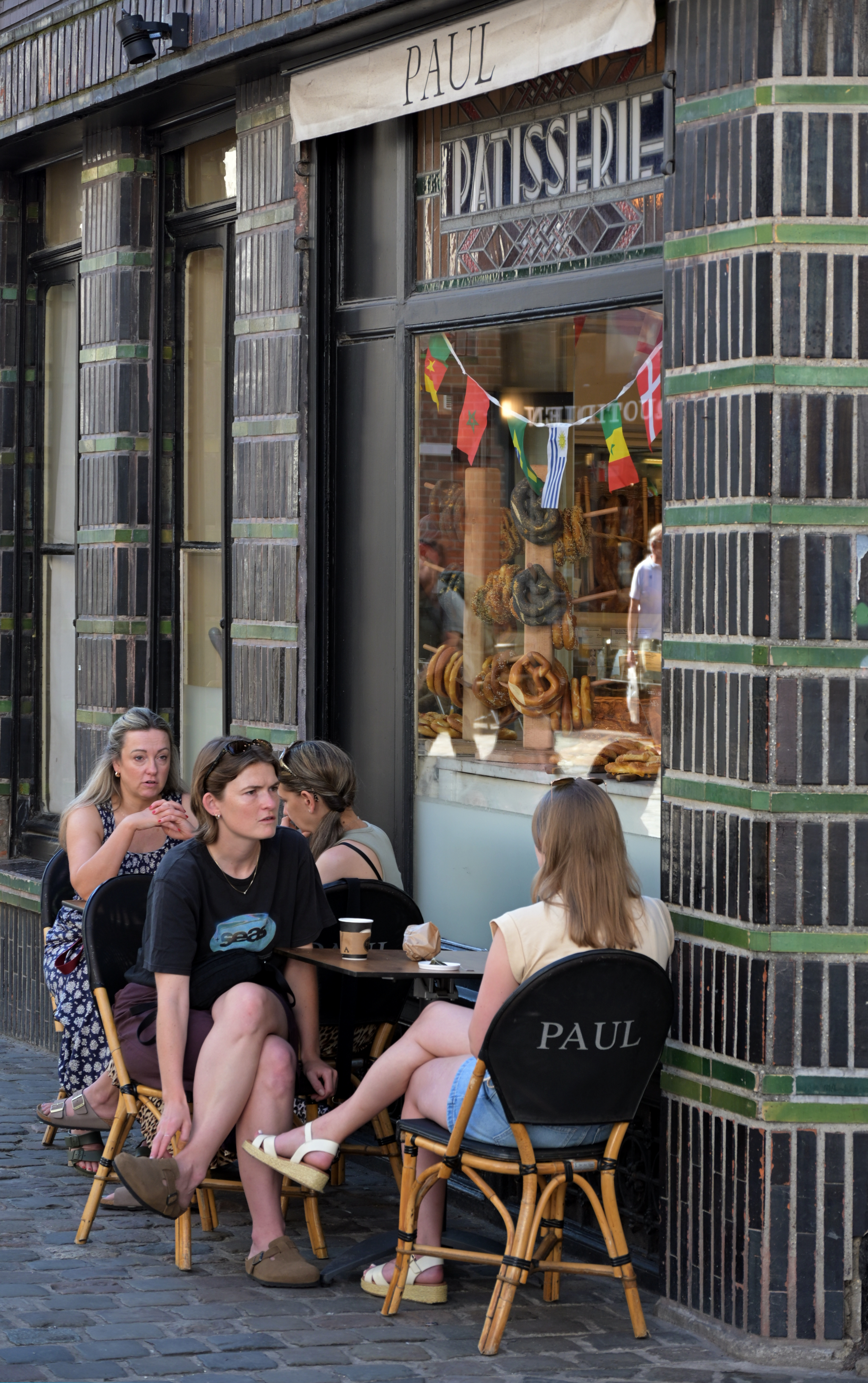
Outdoor seating at Paul in Lille, France

Paul is a French chain of bakery-café restaurants operating in 47 countries with the head office at Marcq-en-Barœul, Greater Lille, France. It specializes in serving French products, including breads, crêpes, sandwiches, macarons, soups, cakes, pastries, coffee, wine and beer. It is a five generation, family company currently owned by Groupe Holder, which also owned the French luxury pâtisserie Ladurée from 2002 to 2021.

== History ==
In 1889, a bakery was established by Charlemagne Mayot and his wife in the town of Croix, Nord, France. In 1908, their son, Edmond Mayot, took over the bakery. In 1935, Edmond's daughter, Suzanne Mayot, married Julien Holder, himself a baker and pastry chef. Together, they opened a bakery on Rue des Sarrazins, in the Wazemmes district of Lille. In 1953, the Holders and their son Francis took over a better known bakery-pâtisserie owned by the Paul family, and they kept the "Paul" name.

Following the death of his father in 1958, Francis Holder with his mother took over the family bakery in Lille. Because of his status as a breadwinner, Francis Holder did not fight in the Algerian War, however, he was sent for his military obligations to Nogent-le-Rotrou, in Eure-et-Loir. When he returned in 1963, he opened a new Paul bakery, on boulevard de Belfort, Lille, with 10,000 old francs. With his mother's assistance, he expanded the business and when the Nouvelles Galeries opened in 1965, he immediately offered to supply their bread. Under the "Moulin Bleu", Francis Holder provided bread to Auchan and Monoprix from his bakery in Lambersart. By 1970, he was able to purchase an abandoned industrial site at La Madeleine, in the suburbs of Lille, transforming it into an enormous bakery.

The installation in 1972 of a wood stove at the original Lille bakery proved so popular that, as the Paul chain expanded into French malls in Paris and other major French cities, it was incorporated into the general layout. Apart from a change of livery in 1993 (to the now-signature black), the layout and visual aesthetic of Paul stores has not changed.

== Locations ==
As of 2022, there are more than 750 Paul bakery/café restaurants, of which 424 are in France and over 300 are in 47 other countries.

The first bakery outside France was opened in 1985 in Barcelona. The first international franchise started in 1989 in Japan, with a bakery opened in Nagoya. The third country outside France to open was Morocco in 1998, where 14 Paul bakeries are open. It is also present with 34 bakeries in United Kingdom since 2000, 14 in Lebanon since 2002, 21 in Belgium since 2007, 12 in Romania, six in Taiwan since 2008, seven in Singapore since 2012, four (with one under construction) in India and over 70 in the Middle East since 2013.

In addition to French cities, it has multiple locations in other cities such as Abu Dhabi, Bahrain, Beirut, Bruxelles, Bucharest, Cairo, Cape Town, Casablanca, Doha, Dubai, Johannesburg, London, Nouakchott, Prague, Rabat, Riyadh, Singapore, Taipei, Tokyo, and Washington.

Paul's first bakery in Pakistan was opened in Karachi in March 2021. In May 2021, Paul opened its first Canadian bakery in Vancouver.

| Since | Country |
|---|---|
| 1985 | Spain |
| 1990 | Japan |
| 1998 | Morocco |
| 2000 | United Kingdom |
| 2002 | Lebanon |
| 2003 | Kuwait, United Arab Emirates |
| 2005 | United States |
| 2007 | Belgium, China (closed), Jordan, Réunion (France) |
| 2008 | Romania, Taiwan |
| 2009 | South Korea (closed 2013) |
| 2010 | Czech Republic, Greece |
| 2011 | Egypt, Saudi Arabia, Singapore |
| 2012 | Luxembourg, Russia, Saudi Arabia |
| 2013 | Indonesia, Ivory Coast, Kazakhstan, Oman, Philippines |
| 2014 | Azerbaijan, Thailand, Ukraine |
| 2015 | Panama, Poland |
| 2015 | South Africa |
| 2016 | Georgia, Portugal, Vietnam |
| 2017 | Belarus, Cyprus, Gabon, Malaysia, South Africa, Tunisia |
| 2018 | Mauritius |
| 2019 | Uzbekistan, India |
| 2021 | Pakistan, Canada |
| 2022 | Armenia, Mauritania |
| 2023 | Cameroon, Italy |
| 2024 | Mongolia |
| 2025 | Algeria |
| 2026 | Iraq |

== Menu ==
Products include pastries, cakes, beignets, croissants, sandwiches, soups, quiches, tarts, crepes, eggs, and over 140 types of bread. They also have tea, wine, beer, mineral water, soft drinks and coffee-based drinks.

== See also ==
- List of bakery cafés
