= Francis Holder =

French businessman

Francis Holder (born July 28, 1940) is a French businessman, Founder, Chairman, Chief Executive Officer and Managing Director of the Groupe Holder which owns companies like Ladurée and PAUL.

== Biography ==
Holder began working for his parents in 1953 after they took over a pastry shop belonging to the Paul family and decided to keep its name. In 1958, when his father died, Holder and his mother took over the family bakery in Lille and continued its development, founding the Groupe Holder in 1962.

In 1965, operating from a bakehouse in Lambersart, Holder began supplying Nouvelles Galeries in Lille with bread. His customer list soon included Auchan, Nouvelles Galeries and later Monoprix. This was the first step in the creation of his production company, the “Moulin Bleu” brand. By 1970, he was able to expand his business into the mass retail sector through his purchase of a property at La Madeleine in the suburbs of Lille where he established his first Moulin Bleu bakery plant. He continued to expand both the Moulin Bleu and Paul businesses and broadened the reach of the business by acquiring sites in selected French cities.

In 1993, Holder purchased Ladurée in Paris. Taking note of an emerging rustic trend for storefronts, he decided to reestablish the use of a traditional wheat in creating a new line of loaves. He is also responsible for the expansion of Paul into a previously untapped market of convenience stores in France, with the goal of creating mini-malls that would be called "Paul Villages." The concept was first tested in 1993 in Marcq-en-Barœul (in Lille) and, with 1000 customers visiting the bakery daily, the next four years saw the development of three more in the North. In 2001 the company announced that they would be opening four more locations in the following nine months.

== Personal life ==
Holder is the son of Suzanne Mayot and Julien Holder, who set up their home in a bakery on Rue des Sarrazins in Lille. He and his wife Françoise have three children who work in the business as well: Elisabeth, who is responsible for the development of Ladurée in Paris, Maxime, who directs the development of Paul International, and David, President of Ladurée and Vice President of Groupe Holder.
