= John P. D'Arcy =

American electrical engineer (1957–1994)

John Paul D'Arcy
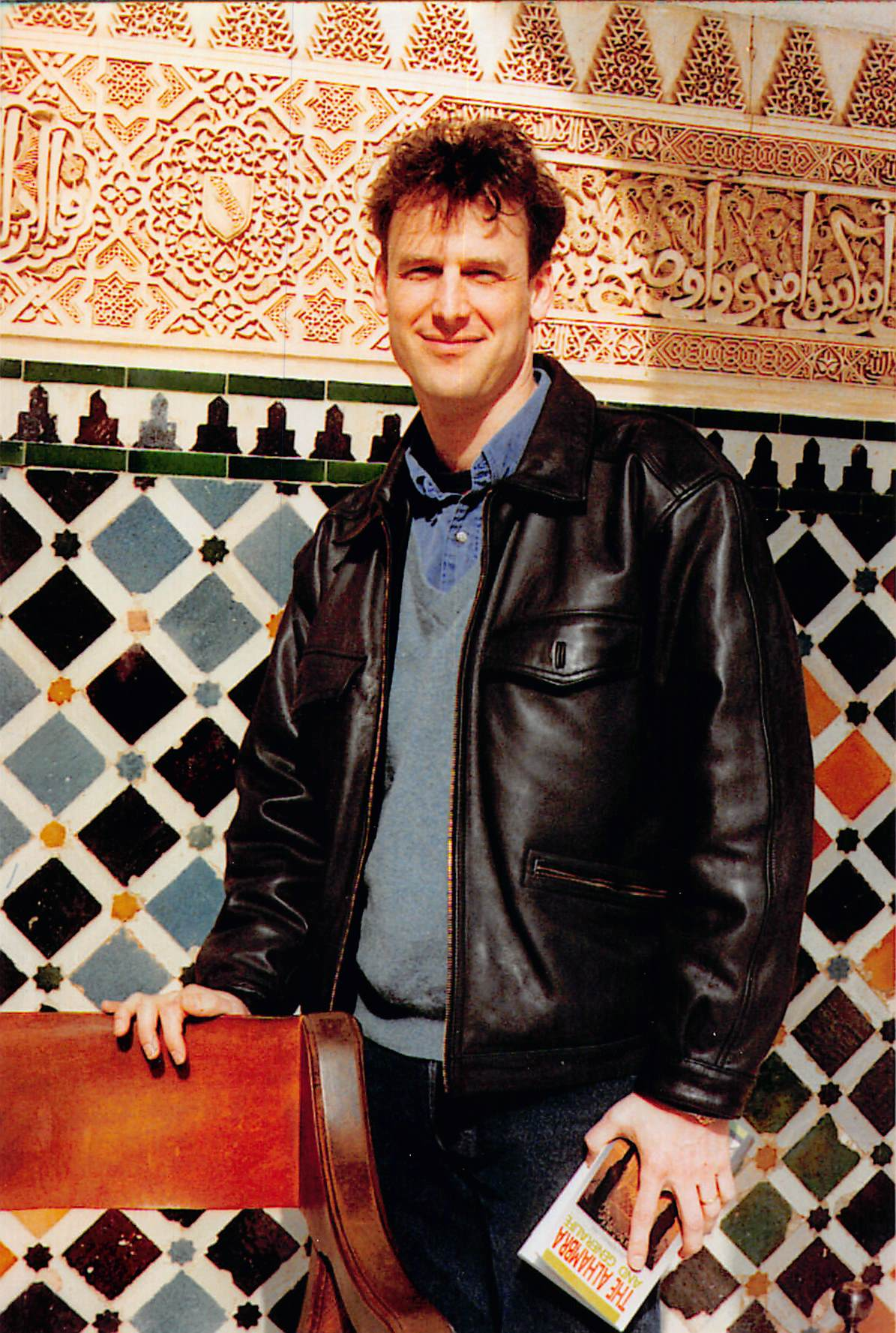
- John P. D'Arcy, Granada, Spain, 1990s
- Born: December 28, 1957; Indianapolis, Indiana
- Died: July 4, 1994 (aged 36)
- Citizenship: USA
- Education: Brown University
- Employer(s): Miller & Kreisel Sound Corporation
- Spouse: Meredithe Stuart-Smith (née Karl)
- Children: 1

John Paul D'Arcy (December 28, 1957 – July 4, 1994) was an American electrical engineer and inventor closely associated with designing commercial subwoofers and lasers for Photorefractive keratectomy.

He attended Palos Verdes High School in Los Angeles County from 1972 to 1975, and graduated from Northfield Mount Hermon preparatory school in 1976, before enrolling at Brown University. He worked at A Broun Sound in San Rafael, California, reconing loudspeakers for the Grateful Dead before taking a position at Miller & Kreisel Sound Corporation (M&K), where he worked from 1980 to 1984. His contributions to the filter and amplifier sections of their powered subwoofers (Models V-1B, V-2B, V-3B, VX-4 and VX-7), and to the development of the Satellite speakers (Models S-1B, S-2B, S-3B and SX-4) helped establish M&K as an early leader in the satellite/subwoofer market. M&K Executive Vice President Charles Back called D'Arcy "the best digital engineer we ever worked with.". He subsequently worked for Spectra Physics Corporation in San Jose, California, designing lasers for supermarket scanners, and for VISX Corporation of San Jose where he developed lasers for optical surgery until his death. In the early 1990s, he served as a guest lecturer at Stanford University's Center for Computer Research in Music and Acoustics.

D'Arcy was married to Meredithe Stuart-Smith, founder of the international children's lifestyle company Meri Meri. Their daughter, Jocelyn D’Arcy, graduated from MIT and is founder and chief executive of Poindexter Labs,"Poindexter Labs raises £2M to improve training data for advanced AI". Tech.eu. 2 June 2026.
