= Macaron =

Sweet meringue-based confectionery

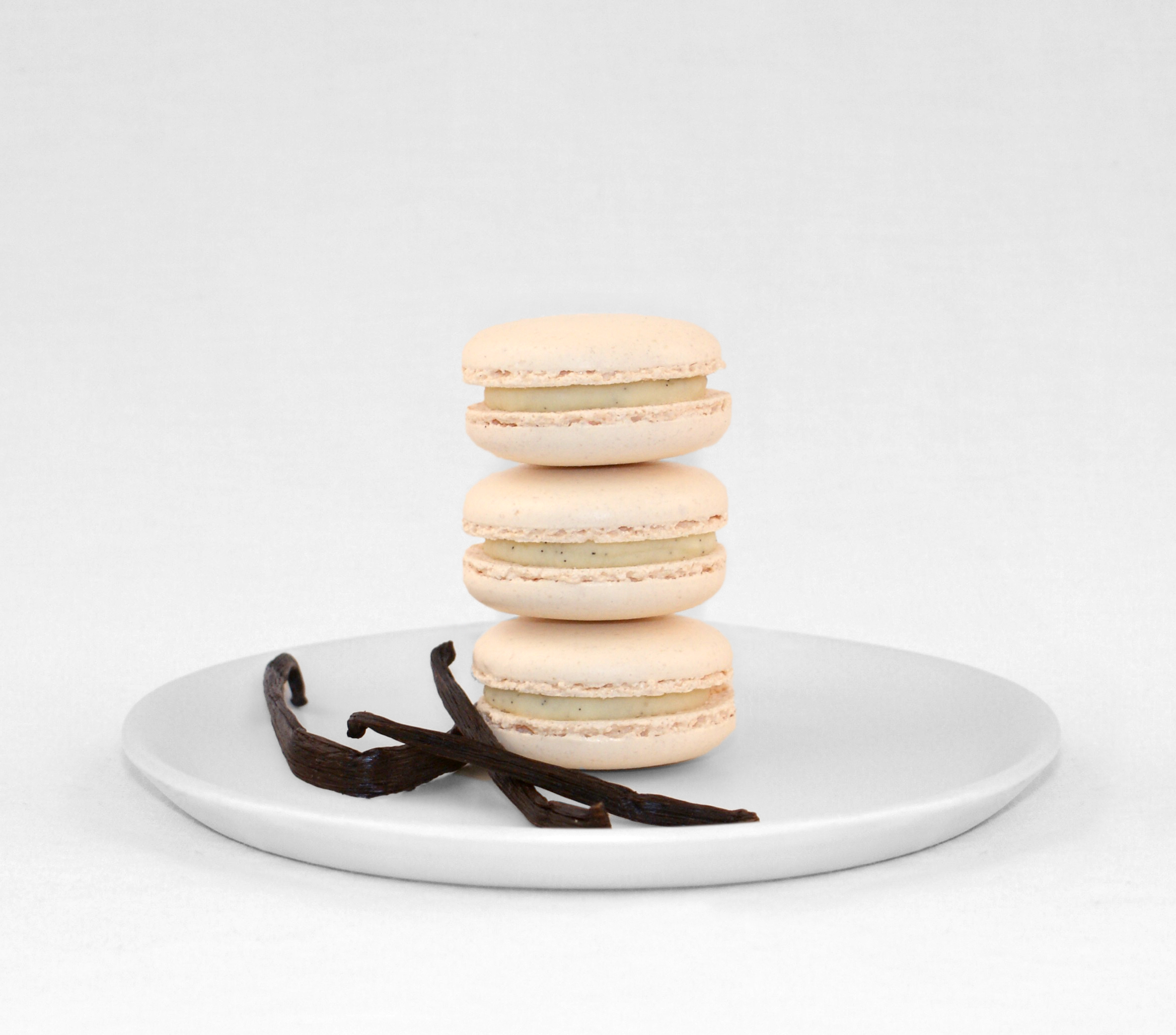
- Parisian-style macarons (vanilla flavour)
- Alternative names: French macaroon
- Type: Confectionery
- Place of origin: France
- Created by: Pierre Desfontaines or Claude Gerbet
- Main ingredients: Meringue: egg white, icing sugar, granulated sugar, almond powder, food colouring Filling: buttercream or clotted cream, ganache, or jam

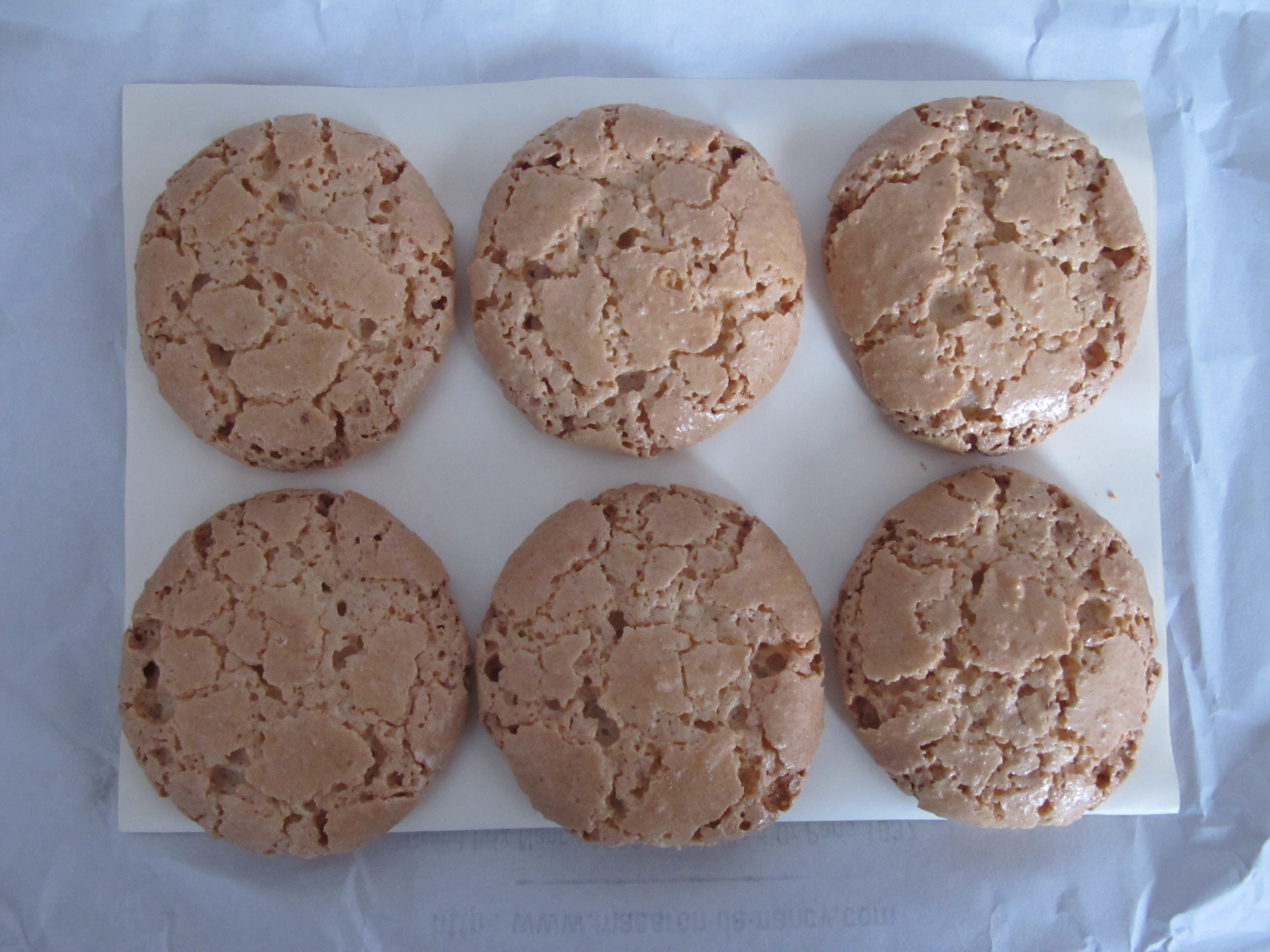
Traditional macarons de Nancy

A macaron (/ˌmækəˈrɒn/ MAK-ə-RON, French: [makaʁɔ̃]) or French macaroon (/ˌmækəˈruːn/ MAK-ə-ROON) is a sweet meringue-based confection made with egg white, icing sugar, granulated sugar, almond meal, and often food colouring.

Since the 19th century, a typical Parisian-style macaron has been filled with a ganache, buttercream or jam. As baked, the circular macaron displays a smooth, square-edged top, a ruffled circumference—referred to as the "crown" or "foot" (or "pied")—and a flat base. It is mildly moist and easily melts in the mouth. Macarons can be found in a wide variety of flavours that range from traditional sweet such as raspberry or chocolate to savoury (as a foie gras).

== Name ==
The names "macaron" and "macaroon" both derive from the French word macaron, which in turn derives from the Italian maccheroni (also the source of "macaroni"). French words ending with "-on" that were borrowed into English in the 16th and 17th centuries usually end with "-oon" (for example: "balloon", "cartoon", "platoon"). In North America, most bakers use the term "macaron", distinguishing it from the related coconut or almond macaroon. In addition to "macaron", in the UK they are also referred to as "French macaroons" (or just "macaroons").

== History ==
Although the sandwich-style macaron known today was created in Paris by Claude Gerbet, the story of the macaron can be traced to other almond-based cakes that appeared earlier.

Arab troops from Ifrīqiya (now Tunisia) occupied Sicily in 827. They brought with them nut-based sweets such as fālūdhaj and lauzinaj—baked goods with sweet almond cream inside. These pastries had been handed down by the Sassanid shahs in Persia, where the almond cake was made to celebrate the Zoroastrian New Year (Nowruz). In Sicily and in Toledo, Spain, another contact point between Muslim and Christian culture, fālūdhaj and lauzinaj developed into various desserts, such as the almond-paste tarts called marzapane and caliscioni.

Some food historians trace the origin of macarons to a French monastery in Cormery in the 8th century (791), in the Loire Valley. This particular macaron is made with egg whites, sugar and almonds.

A Swiss online encyclopaedia on the history of baking says that they were brought from al-Andalus (present-day Spain) to Marrakesh (present-day Morocco) in the early 11th century by the sultan and first king of the Almoravid dynasty Yusuf ibn Tashfin, and that they were served mainly during Ramadan.

A popular legend tells that the macaron was introduced in France by a chef of Catherine de Medici, however, a thorough investigation of records listing service personnel who worked with Catherine since her arrival in France until her death revealed the absence of any Italian chefs.

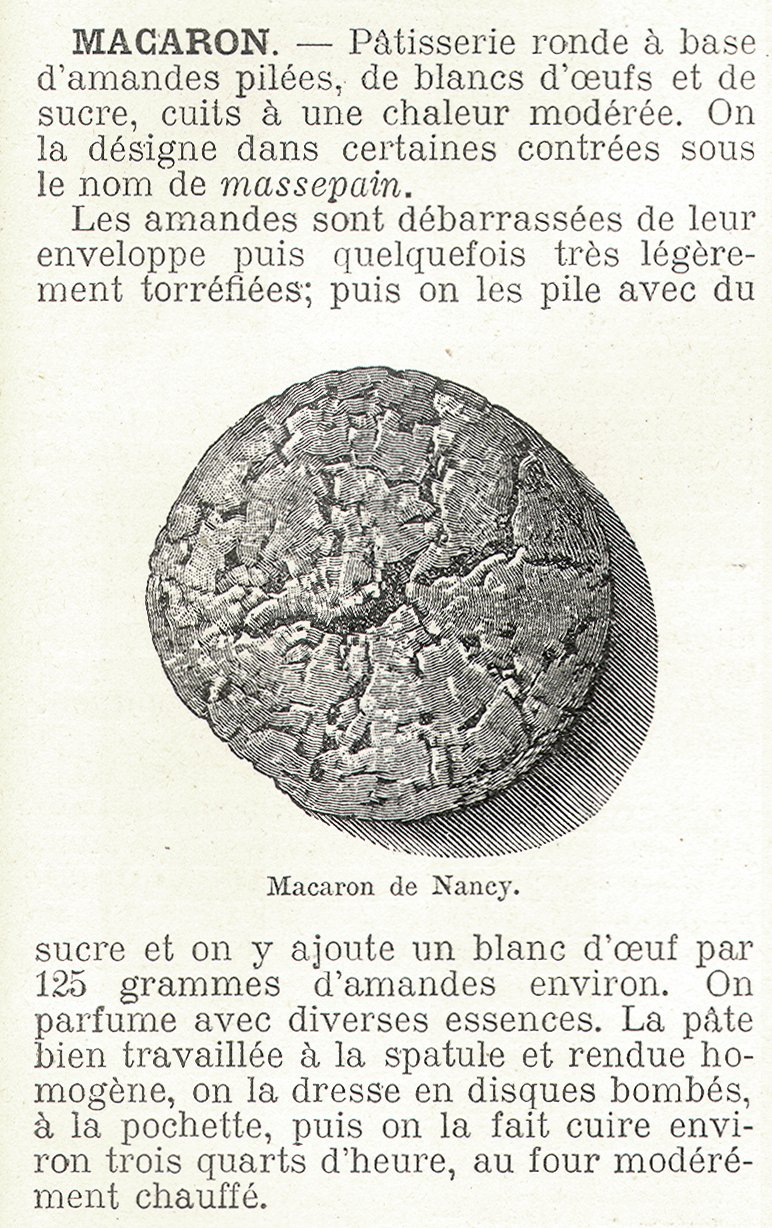
Picture from Dictionnaire encyclopédique de l'épicerie et des industries annexes, by Albert Seigneurie, edited by L'Épicier in 1904, page 431

In the 1790s, macarons began to gain fame when two Carmelite nuns, seeking asylum in Nancy during the French Revolution, baked and sold the macarons in order to pay for their housing. These nuns became known as the "Macaron Sisters". In these early stages, macarons were served without special flavours or fillings.

It was not until the 1930s that macarons began to be served as a sandwich with the addition of jams, liqueurs, and spices. The macaron as it is known today, composed of two almond meringue discs filled with a layer of buttercream, jam, or ganache, was originally called the "Gerbet" or the "Paris macaron". Pierre Desfontaines, of the French pâtisserie Ladurée, has sometimes been credited with its creation in the early part of the 20th century, but another baker, Claude Gerbet, also claims to have invented it. French macaron bakeries became trendy in North America in the 2010s.

== Earliest recipe ==
The earliest known recipe dates back to the early 17th century and appears to be inspired by a French version of the recipe:

To make French Macaroones
Wash a pound of the newest and the best Jordane Almonds in three or foure waters, to take away the rednesse from their out-side, lay them in a Bason of warme water all night, the next day blanch them, and dry them with a faire cloath, beat them in a stone morter, until they be reasonably fine, put to them halfe a pound of fine beaten Sugar, and so beat it to a perfect Paste, then put in halfe a dozen spoonefuls of good Damaske Rose-water, three graines of Ambergreece, when you have beaten all this together, dry it on a chafingdish of coales until it grow white and stiffe, then take it off the fire, and put the whites of two new laid Egs first beaten into froath, and so stirre it well together, then lay them on wafers in fashion of little long rowles, and so bake them in an Oven as hot as for Manchet, but you must first let the heat of the Oven passe over before you put them in, when they rise white and light, take them out of the Oven, and put them in a warm platter, and set them againe into the warme Oven & so let them remain foure or five houres, and then they wil be thoroughly dry, but if you like them better being moist, then dry them not after the first baking.

— John Murrell, A Daily Exercise for Ladies and Gentlewomen (1617)

== Method ==
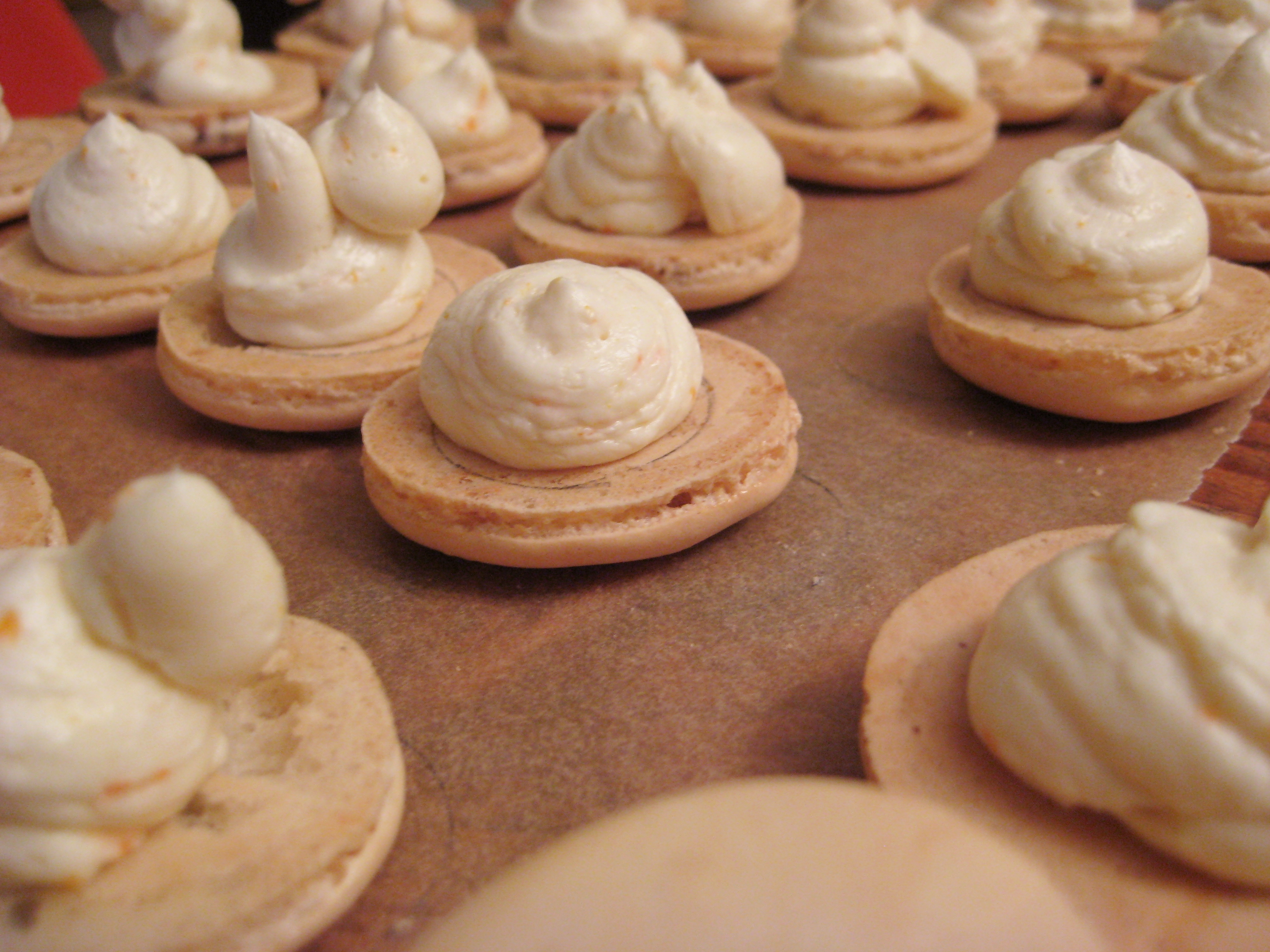
Macaron preparation

There are two main methods for making a macaron – using either French or Italian meringue (which also originated in France despite its name).

In the French method, egg whites are whisked until stiff-peaked meringue forms. From there, sifted, ground almonds and powdered sugar are folded in slowly until the desired consistency is reached. This process of knocking out air and folding is called macaronage.

In the Italian method, egg whites are whisked with hot sugar syrup to form a meringue. Sifted almonds and icing sugar are separately mixed with raw egg whites to form a paste. The meringue and almond paste are mixed together to form the macaron mixture. This method is often deemed more structurally sound yet also sweeter and also requires a candy thermometer for the sugar syrup.

A vegan variation involves the use of aquafaba in place of egg white. All other ingredients are essentially the same.

Either Italian or French meringue can be combined with ground almonds. The two elements are then folded together until they are the consistency of "shaving foam", and then are piped, left to form a skin, and baked. Sometimes, a filling is added.

== Variations ==
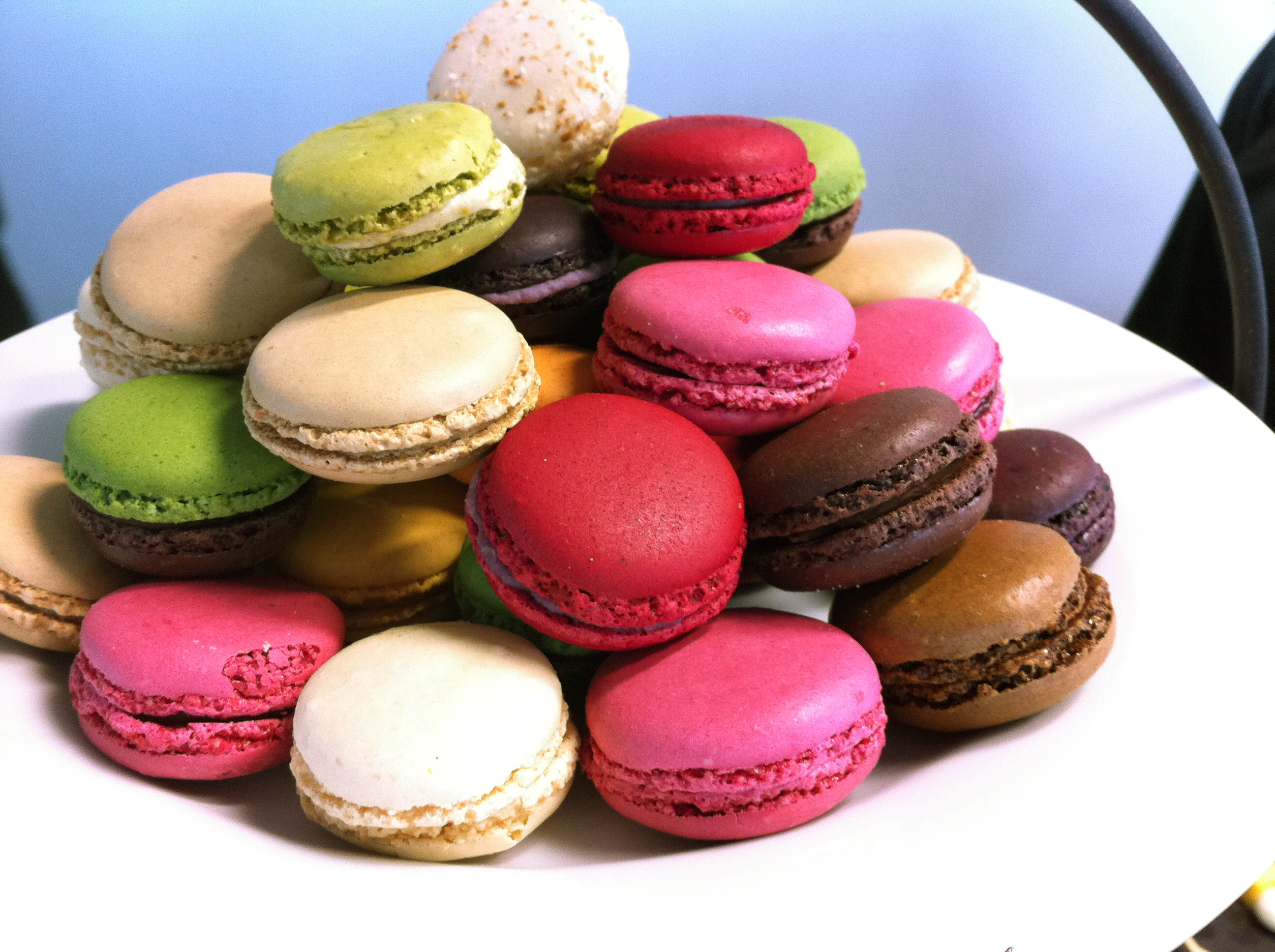
Macarons in a variety of colours

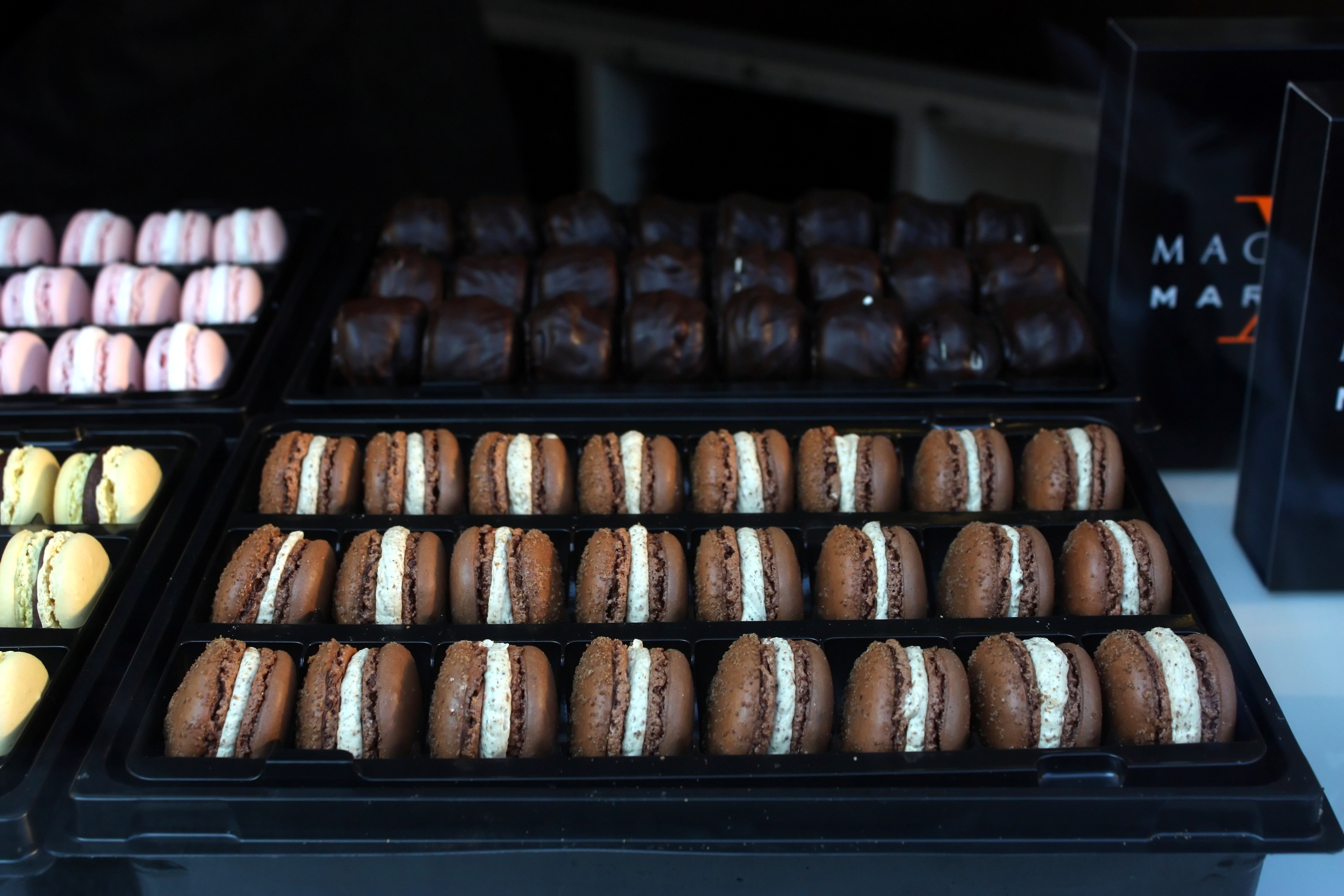
Macarons in a Pierre Marcolini shop window

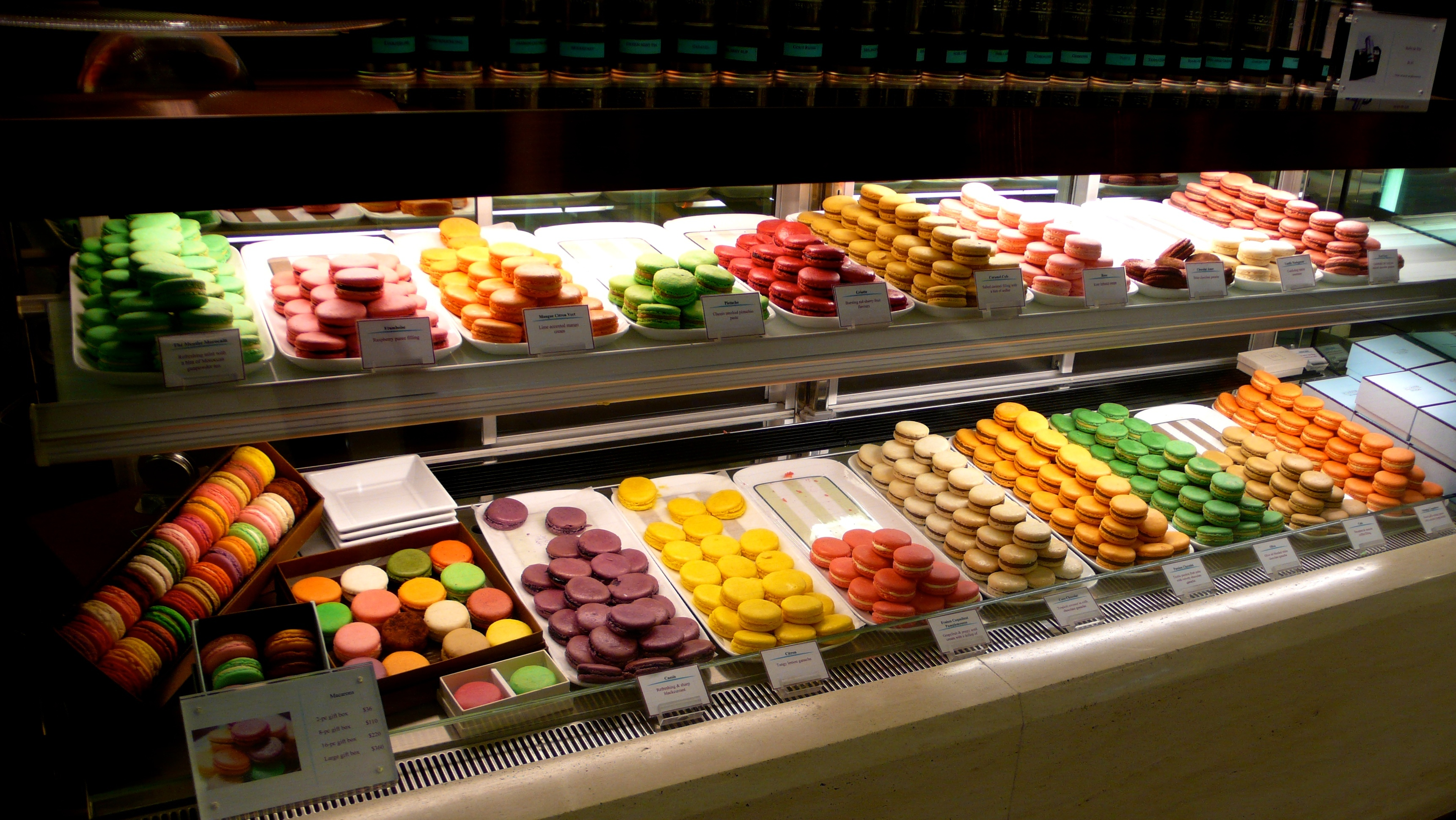
Macarons (caramel and salt) on sale at Two International Finance Centre (IFC), Hong Kong

=== France ===
Several French cities and regions claim long histories and variations, notably Lorraine (Nancy and Boulay), Basque Country (Saint-Jean-de-Luz), Saint-Émilion, Amiens, Montmorillon, Le Dorat, Sault, Chartres, Cormery, Joyeuse and Sainte-Croix in Burgundy.

Macarons d'Amiens, made in Amiens, are small, round-shaped biscuit-type macarons made from almond paste, fruit and honey, which were first recorded in 1855.

The city of Montmorillon is well known for its macarons and has a museum dedicated to them. The Maison Rannou-Métivier is the oldest macaron bakery in Montmorillon, dating back to 1920. The traditional recipe for Montmorillon macarons has remained unchanged for over 150 years.

The town of Nancy in the Lorraine region has a storied history with the macaron. It is said that the abbess of Remiremont founded an order of nuns called the "Dames du Saint-Sacrement" with strict dietary rules prohibiting the consumption of meat. Two nuns, Sisters Marguerite, and Marie-Elisabeth are credited with creating the Nancy macaron to fit their dietary requirements. They became known as the 'Macaron Sisters' (Les Soeurs Macarons). In 1952, the city of Nancy honoured them by giving their name to the Rue de la Hache, where the macaron was invented.

=== India ===
Thoothukudi in Tamil Nadu has its own variety of macaroon made with cashews instead of almonds, adapted from macarons introduced in colonial times.

=== Japan ===
Macarons in Japan are a popular confection known as マカロン (makaron). There is also another widely available version of makaron which substitutes peanut flour for almond and a wagashi-style flavouring. The makaron is featured in Japanese fashion through cell phone accessories, stickers, and cosmetics aimed towards women.

=== Switzerland ===
In Switzerland, Luxemburgerli (also Luxembourger) are a brand name of macaron made by Confiserie Sprüngli in Zürich. A Luxemburgerli comprises two disks of almond meringue with a buttercream filling, available in a variety flavours. Luxemburgerli are smaller and lighter than macarons from many other vendors.

=== United States ===
Pastry chefs in the US have expanded the classic macaron to include such varied flavours as mint chocolate chip, peanut butter and jelly, Snickers, peach champagne, pistachio, strawberry cheesecake, candy corn, salted pretzel, chocolate peanut butter, oatmeal raisin, candy cane, cinnamon, maple bacon, pumpkin, and salted caramel popcorn.

=== South Korea ===
In addition to macarons, fat-carons (뚱까롱, thick macarons), also called ttungcarons, were invented and became popular in South Korea. The bakers intentionally overfill the macaron filings and later decorate them as well. The appearance can resemble more to that of a small ice cream sandwich.

== Popularity ==
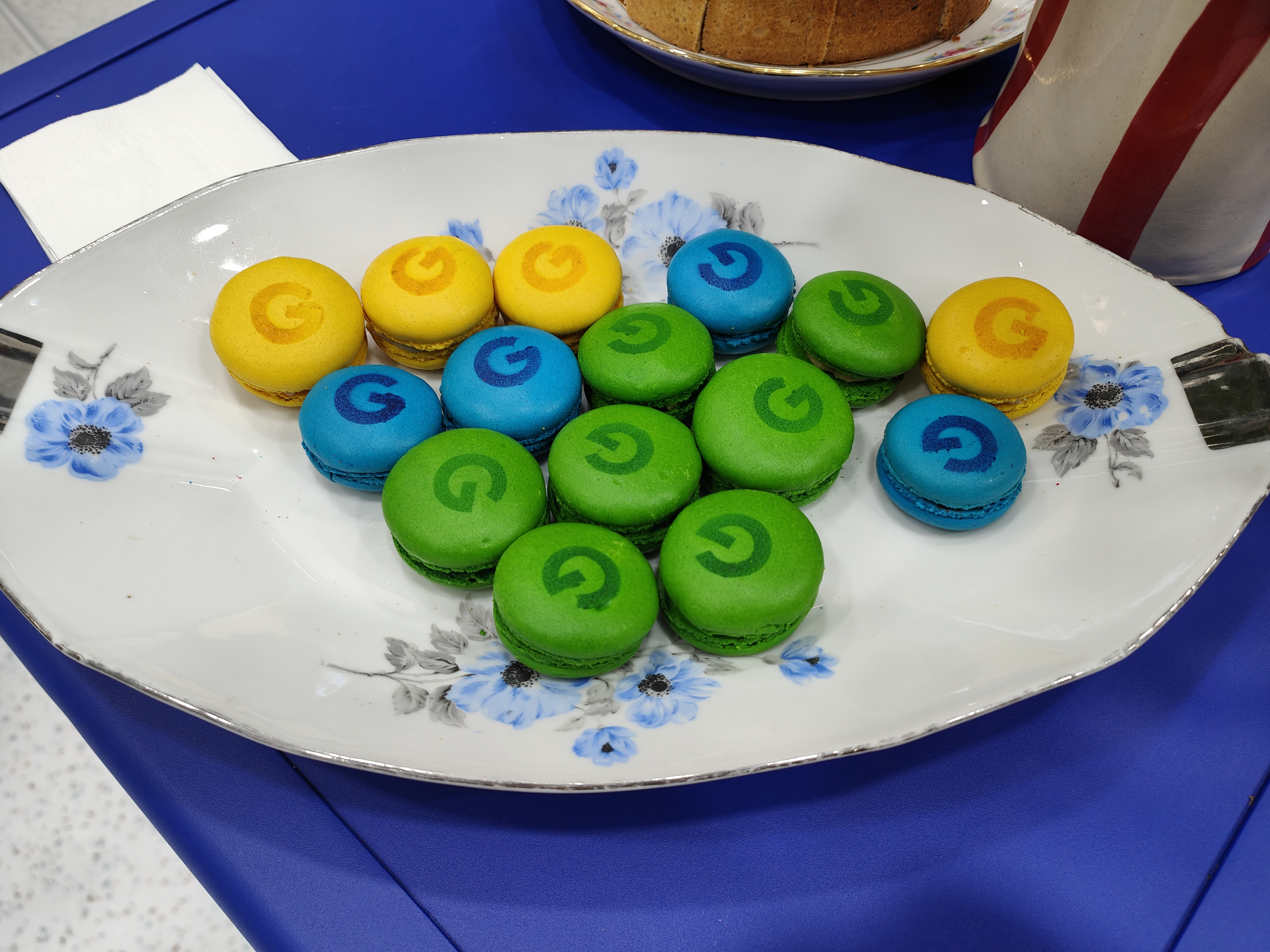
Stylized macarons with the Google logo in 2025.

In Paris, the Ladurée chain of pastry shops has been known for its macarons for about 150 years.

In Portugal, Spain, Australia, France, Belgium, Switzerland, and New Zealand McDonald's sells macarons in their McCafés (sometimes using advertising that likens the shape of a macaron to that of a hamburger). McCafé macarons are produced by Château Blanc, which, like Ladurée, is a subsidiary of Groupe Holder, though they do not use the same macaron recipe.

Outside of Europe, the French-style macaron can be found in Canada and the United States.

== See also ==
- Macaroon
- Sandwich cookie
- Alfajor – a similar Spanish confection
- Petit four
- Empire biscuit
- Fudge cookie
- Jammie Dodgers
- List of almond dishes
