= Meredithe Stuart-Smith =

American designer (born 1957)

Meredithe Stuart-Smith (née Karl; born 1957) is an American designer. She was a major figure in the alternative card movement of the 1980s and has continued to be influential in the subsequent development of greetings cards and lifestyle markets. She is founder of the multi-national children’s lifestyle company Meri Meri. Since 1996 she has lived primarily in the UK.

== Early life ==
Stuart-Smith grew up in Kansas City, near to the headquarters of Hallmark. In 1978 she married the design engineer John P. D'Arcy (1957–1994). They moved to California where Mr. D'Arcy worked for Miller & Kreisel Sound Corporation from 1980 to 1984.

== Early career ==
Stuart-Smith showed an interest in fashion and making things from an early age. In 1985 she started making greetings cards at home and selling them to stores in Los Angeles. There were no hand-made cards in the market at that time. Following local success, she exhibited in NYC in 1987, where her company Meri Meri attracted the attention of Bergdorf Goodman and established a nationwide customer base. Meri Meri was an early member of the alternative card movement of small design-led companies that started to compete against Hallmark and American Greetings in the 1980s. The company established a base in Belmont, California. A self-taught designer inspired by clothing, fabric and fashion, Stuart-Smith's hand-made cards were very different from the standard styles of the time. Stuart-Smith’s designs revolutionized greetings cards, using materials and design sources previously unknown in that sector. Between 1987 and 2005, Meri Meri won 81 Louie awards, a record for any company. In 1996 Stuart-Smith moved to England and set up a UK arm of the company: the HQ remained in Belmont. The company continued to expand, with a growing design team in the UK.

== Design Expansion ==
The growth of internet communication in the early 2000s put pressure on Stuart-Smith to move into different product areas. She moved initially into party invitations, followed by a focus on paper products for children’s parties. She introduced cupcake kits to the market in 2008, and expanded further into other children's party products in the following years. She is considered to have reshaped the children’s party sector.

== Current career ==
Stuart-Smith has remained current, producing design collaborations for a variety of premium brands: these have included Ladurée and Liberty of London. Her products continue to be used by an international clientele.

== Personal life ==
Stuart-Smith lives in the UK and is married to James Stuart-Smith, son of the British Judge James Stuart-Smith. They have two children. Her hobbies include building and sailing boats.
