= Laboratoires Urgo =

French pharmaceutical company

- Type: Private (SAS)
- Industry: Pharmaceuticals
- Founded: 1880 (as Laboratoires Fournier)
- Founders: Eugène Fournier, Pierre Bon
- Headquarters: Dijon, France
- Key people: Briac Le Lous, Tristan Le Lous, Guirec Le Lous
- Products: Urgo, UrgoK2, Alvityl, Belloc, Humer
- Owner: Le Lous family
- Parent: Urgo Group
- Website: www.urgo.fr

Laboratoires Urgo is a French pharmaceutical and medical device company based in Dijon. It is part of the Urgo Group, a family owned healthcare group.

== History ==
The company originated as Laboratoires Fournier, founded in Dijon in 1880. Jean Le Lous, who headed the company from 1940, created the Urgo brand in 1958. After his death in 2002, the Fournier group was split up and Laboratoires Urgo was bought by his son Hervé Le Lous. The company then expanded abroad through acquisitions in the United Kingdom, Spain and Brazil. Since 2019, the group has been chaired in rotation by Hervé Le Lous's three sons.

== Brands ==
Laboratoires Urgo sells consumer healthcare products under brands including Urgo (first aid), Alvityl (dietary supplements), Belloc (digestive discomfort) and Humer (nasal hygiene).

== Operations ==
The Urgo Group employs about 4,000 people, half of them in France, and passed one billion euros in annual revenue in 2026. In November 2025, it announced a €60 million plant in Andrézieux-Bouthéon to produce UrgoK2 medical compression bandages, with the first phase scheduled for 2028.

== Legal issues ==
In January 2023, Laboratoires Urgo was fined €1,125,000, of which €625,000 was suspended, for giving pharmacists benefits in kind worth €55 million in exchange for giving up commercial discounts.
