= Groupe Holder =

French business group

Groupe Holder SAS
- Company type: Private (SAS)
- Founded: 1962
- Founder: Francis Holder
- Headquarters: Marcq-en-Barœul, France
- Products: Bakery, pastries
- Revenue: 323,000,000 euro (2023)
- Net income: 6,000,000 euro (2023)
- Website: www.groupeholder.com

Groupe Holder SAS is French business group founded by Francis Holder in 1962. The group includes companies like Ladurée, Chateau Blanc, PANAPRO, Panétude-Pandéco, IFH (Institut de Formation Holder) and Paul. The head office is located at Marcq-en-Barœul in Greater Lille, France.

== Brands ==
Château Blanc was one of the first French bakeries that specializes in bread, cakes, viennoiserie and ready-to-eat products. They focus on using new technologies to produce goods in the style of traditional French artisans. Château Blanc divides their products into five categories: Grand Pain de France, Grande Viennoiserie de France, Grande Pâtisserie de France, Grand Traiteur de France and a line of breads that you can make at home.

Paul was founded in 1889 and now has more than 449 bakery and pastry shops across four continents. The Holder family took over the bakery in 1953 and decided to keep the name while expanding the business. Paul endeavors to adhere to strict recipes to ensure that all their bread is fresh and has the same taste across the globe. Paul offers a wide range of baked goods and pastries as well as a number of restaurants.
