= Hôtel de Ville, Marcq-en-Barœul =

Town hall in Marcq-en-Barœul, France

Hôtel de Ville
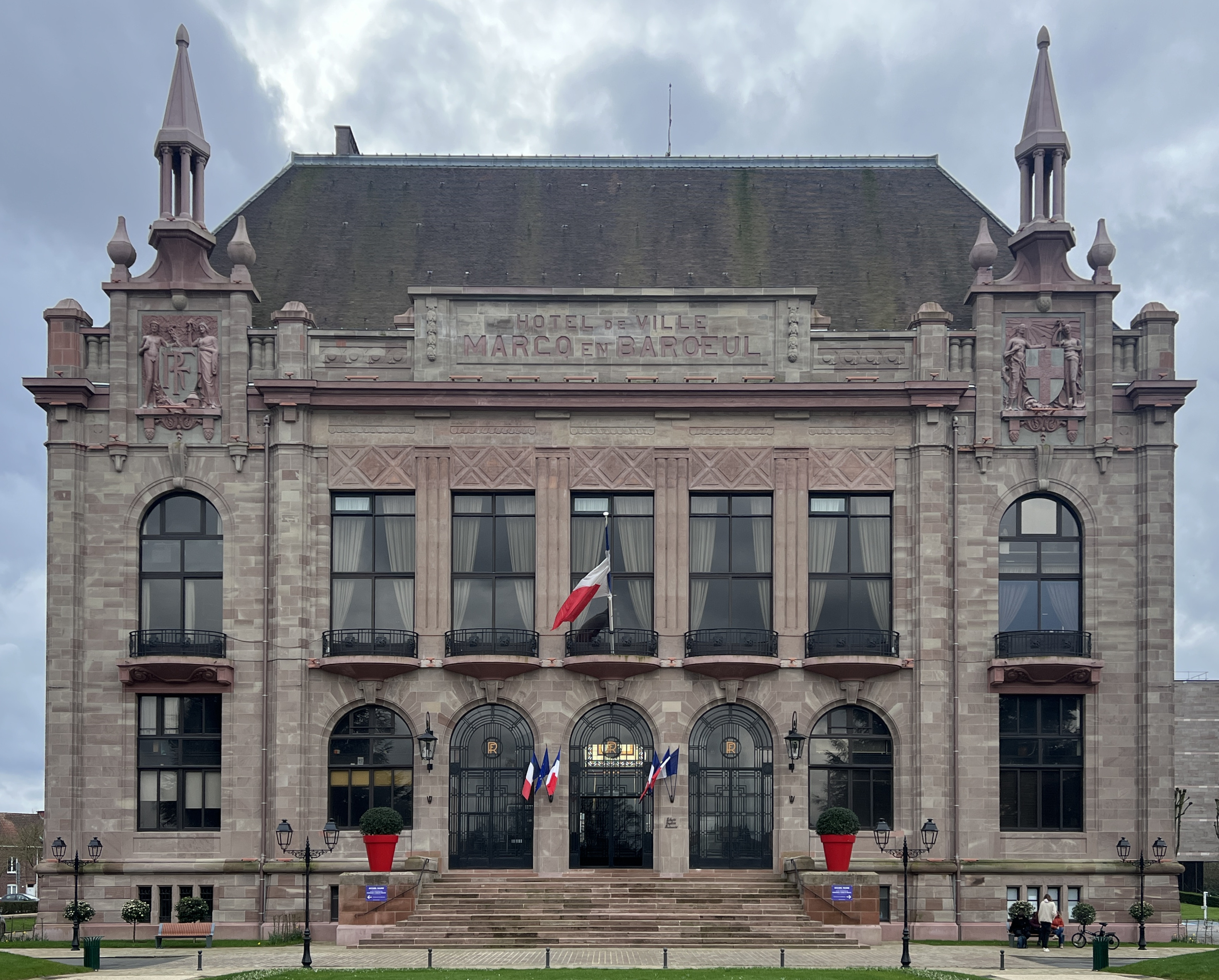
- The main frontage of the Hôtel de Ville in February 2024
- Interactive map of the Hôtel de Ville area

General information
- Type: City hall
- Architectural style: Art Deco style
- Location: Marcq-en-Barœul, France
- Coordinates: 50.6734°N 3.0940°E
- Completed: 1937

Design and construction
- Architects: René Gobillon and Gaston Trannoy

The Hôtel de Ville (French pronunciation: [otɛl də vil], City Hall) is a municipal building in Marcq-en-Barœul, Nord, in northern France, standing on Avenue du Maréchal Foch.

== History ==
Following the French Revolution, the town council initially met at the home of the mayor at the time. This arrangement continued until the early 1840s, when the council led by the mayor, Pierre François Delos, decided to commission a dedicated town hall. The site they selected was on Place du Bourg (now Place du Genéral de Gaulle), at the corner of Rue Gabriel-Péri and Rue du Lazaro. The new building was designed in the neoclassical style, built in brick with a white stucco finish, and was completed in 1847. The design involved a symmetrical main frontage of seven bays facing onto the square. The central bay featured a square-headed doorway flanked by pilasters supporting a balcony with iron railings; on the first floor, there was a French door with a moulded surround and there were quoins at the edges of the bay. At roof level, there was a cornice, a pediment above the central bay and a small tower behind. The tower contained an oculus in the first stage and was surmounted by six columns supporting a dome. The wings contained doorways in the second bay from each end and were fenestrated by casement windows in the other bays.

During the First World War, the old town hall was the place where the local German commander posted notices setting out prohibitions and obligations, and threats against offenders. After being vacated by the council in 1937, it was used as accommodation for troops during the Second World War and then as a shelter for refugees after the war. The fabric of the building began to deteriorate and it was demolished in 1962.

In the early 1930s, the town council decided to commission a more substantial town hall. The site they selected was open agricultural land on the southwest side of what is now Avenue du Maréchal Foch. The new building was designed by René Gobillon and Gaston Trannoy in the Art Deco style, built with a reinforced concrete frame and faced with pink sandstone, and was officially opened by the mayor, Albert Bailly, on 27 June 1937.

The design involved a symmetrical main frontage of seven bays facing onto Avenue du Maréchal Foch. The central section of five bays featured a short flight of steps leading up to a group of three rounded headed doorways with voussoirs and keystones, flanked by two round headed windows, also with voussoirs and keystones. On the first floor, there were five casement windows with balconies and iron railings: the windows were flanked by fluted pilasters supporting an entablature, a cornice and a parapet. The parapet was broken by a central panel inscribed "Hotel de Ville Marcq-en-Barœul". The end bays were fenestrated by casement windows on the ground floor and by round headed windows with balconies and iron railings on the first floor. The end bays were surmounted by panels which were decorated with heraldic devices, surmounted by turrets and flanked by pilasters supporting finials. Internally, the principal room was the Salle du Conseil (council chamber).

During the Second World War, elements of the French Resistance seized the town hall on 2 September 1944. This was three days before troops from the British Second Army, commanded by Lieutenant General Miles Dempsey, arrived at the town hall on 5 September 1944. A bust of the politician, Maurice Schumann, sculpted by Bénédicte Dubart, was unveiled in a small park in front of the town hall in December 2012.
