= Marcq-en-Barœul =

Marcq-en-Barœul Marke-in-Bareul (Picard)
- Commune
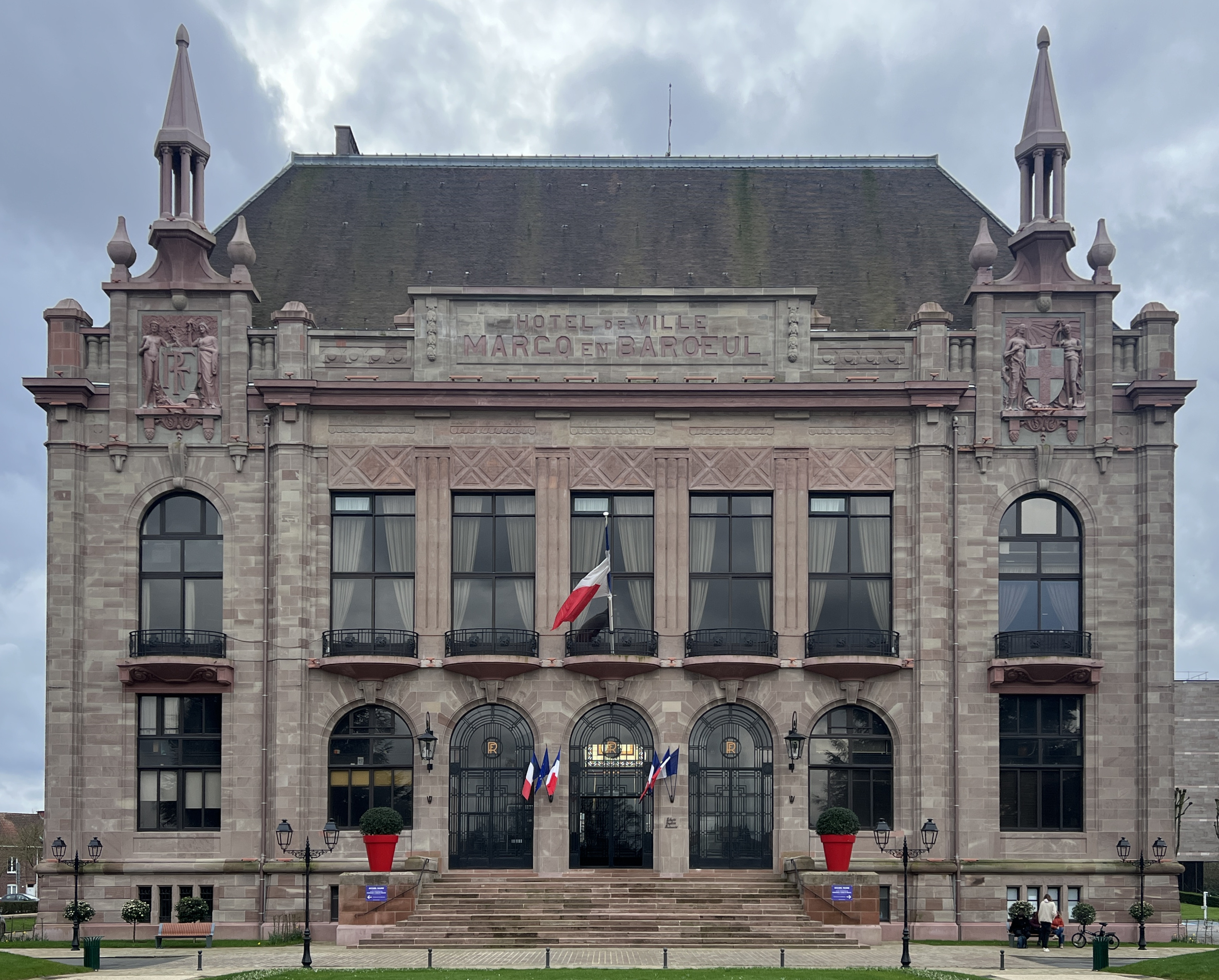
- The Hôtel de Ville

- Coat of arms
- Location of Marcq-en-Barœul
- Location within France Location within Hauts-de-France
- Coordinates: 50°40′16″N 3°05′50″E
- Country: France
- Region: Hauts-de-France
- Department: Nord
- Arrondissement: Lille
- Canton: Lille-2
- Intercommunality: Métropole Européenne de Lille

Government
  - Mayor (2026–32): Loïc Cathelain (LR)
- Area^{1}: 14.04 km^{2} (5.42 sq mi)
- Elevation: 21 m (69 ft)
- Highest elevation: 51 m (167 ft)
- Lowest elevation: 16 m (52 ft)
- Population (2023): 40,184
  - Density: 2,862/km^{2} (7,413/sq mi)
- Time zone: UTC+01:00 (CET)
  - Summer (DST): UTC+02:00 (CEST)
- INSEE/Postal code: 59378 /59700
- ^{1} French Land Register data, which excludes lakes, ponds, glaciers > 1 km^{2} (0.386 sq mi or 247 acres) and river estuaries.

Marcq-en-Barœul (French pronunciation: [maʁkɑ̃ baʁœl], lit. 'Marcq in Barœul'; Picard: Marke-in-Bareul; older Dutch: Marke) is a commune in the Nord department in the Hauts-de-France region, northern France.

It is a suburb of the city of Lille, and is immediately adjacent to it on the northeast. It is the sixth-largest component of the Métropole Européenne de Lille. Marcq-en-Barœul is known as the most affluent suburb city of Lille, it is part of the 'Triangle d'or' (Golden triangle) of Lille. It features expensive real estate, especially alongside the Grand Boulevard and Hippodrome des Flandres racecourse. The city is also home to one of the campuses of the elite international private collège and lycée active bilingue Jeannine-Manuel. Furthermore, the city is home to the Jacques Delors European School of Metropolitan Lille (École Européenne de Lille Métropole Jacques Delors), one of the only accredited European Schools in France.

== History ==
The Hôtel de Ville was completed in 1937.

== Heraldry ==
Arms of Marcq-en-Barœul	The arms of Marcq-en-Barœul are blazoned : Argent, a cross azure. (Croix, Clairfayts and Marcq-en-Barœul use the same arms.)

== Population ==
Historical population

Year	Pop.	±% p.a.
1793	2,648	—
1800	2,613	−0.19%
1806	2,706	+0.58%
1821	2,925	+0.52%
1831	3,132	+0.69%
1836	3,348	+1.34%
1841	3,586	+1.38%
1846	3,937	+1.89%
1851	3,989	+0.26%
1856	4,617	+2.97%
1861	5,922	+5.10%
1866	7,335	+4.37%
1872	7,548	+0.48%
1876	8,411	+2.74%
1881	9,266	+1.96%
1886	9,418	+0.33%
1891	9,752	+0.70%
1896	10,392	+1.28%
1901	11,142	+1.40%

Year	Pop.	±% p.a.
1906	11,520	+0.67%
1911	12,149	+1.07%
1921	12,713	+0.45%
1926	16,145	+4.90%
1931	19,163	+3.49%
1936	21,322	+2.16%
1946	22,271	+0.44%
1954	24,564	+1.23%
1962	29,234	+2.20%
1968	35,136	+3.11%
1975	36,126	+0.40%
1982	35,278	−0.34%
1990	36,601	+0.46%
1999	37,177	+0.17%
2007	39,101	+0.63%
2012	39,600	+0.25%
2017	38,617	−0.50%
2023	40,184	+0.67%

Source: EHESS and INSEE (1968-2023)

== Economy ==
Groupe Holder and subsidiaries Ladurée and Paul have their head offices in the commune.

== Sport ==
A racecourse field is located in the town where several races take place along the year.

Two golf courses are opened:

- Golf des Flandres, near the racecourse
- Cité golfe

=== Rugby ===
Founded in 1971, the rugby club is called Olympique Marcquois Rugby. It is a section of the local multi-sports Club. The Club grew up quickly and join the honneur régional league in 1973. It was promoted in the upper league, Fédérale 3, in 1993 for the first time and again in 2002.

In 2006, the club was promoted in the Fédérale 2 league and remains in the same league up to now.

The rugby school is a strength of the club which welcomes 350 youngsters from 7 years old to 15 years old.

More than six hundred players and sixty volunteers belong to the Olympique Marcquois Rugby which is one of the most important clubs in the County.

The club is affiliated to the Stade Toulousain since 1999.

== Twin towns and sister cities ==
Marcq-en-Barœul is twinned with:

- Ealing, England, United Kingdom
- Gladbeck, Germany
- Poggibonsi, Italy
- Kuurne, Belgium

== See also ==
- Communes of the Nord department
