= Meri Meri =

American design house and lifestyle company

Meri Meri is an American design house and children's lifestyle company founded in 1985. Beginning as a greeting card company, it was a significant member of the alternative card movement of the 1980s. It has been influential in developing greeting cards and party and lifestyle markets and is credited with creating the children's party product sector. Meri Meri is both the company name and the principal brand of the American designer Meredithe Stuart-Smith.

== History ==
=== Greetings Cards ===
Meri Meri originated in 1985 in Los Angeles when Meredithe Stuart-Smith started making greeting cards at home and selling them to stores under the Meri Meri name. There were no commercially sold hand-made cards in the market at that time. Stuart-Smith's cards were different from the standard styles of the time, using materials and design sources previously unknown in that sector.

Following local success, Meri Meri exhibited in New York City in 1987, where the company attracted the attention of Bergdorf Goodman and began to establish a nationwide customer base. By some measures, Meri Meri was the most successful member of the alternative card movement of small design-led companies that started to compete against Hallmark and American Greetings in the 1980s. Between 1987 and 2005, it won 81 Louie awards, a record for any company.

In 1990, the company moved its base to Belmont, California.

In 1996, Stuart-Smith moved to England and set up a United Kingdom arm of the company; the HQ remained in Belmont. The company continued to expand, with a growing design team in the United Kingdom.

=== Design Expansion ===
The growth of Internet communication in the early 2000s put pressure on the company to move into different product areas. The company moved initially into party and event invitations, followed by a focus on paper products for children's parties. In 2008, Meri Meri showed six children's party accessories collections at the New York Stationery Show. They developed the first cupcake kits and introduced them to the market that year. It expanded further into other children's party products in the following years. The company is credited with creating the children's party sector.

Around 2017, it moved into children's bedlinen and soft furnishings, together with homewares, children's jewelry and other sectors.

== Current Operations ==
The company currently has bases in the United States, the United Kingdom, and the Netherlands. Its managing director is Paul Cripps.

The company's products continue to be used by an international clientele.

== Collaborations ==
Meri Meri has produced design collaborations with a variety of artists and brands:

In 2017, it produced a homewares range in collaboration with design-focused store The Hambleton.

In 2020, it produced a range of plates and other products in collaboration with French artist Nathalie Lete.

In 2021, it produced a collaboration with Liberty of London

It has also produced collaborations with London store Harrods and with French patisserie house Ladurée.
