= Thooththukkudi macaroon =

Type of macaroon made in Tamil Nadu, India

Thoothukudi macaroon
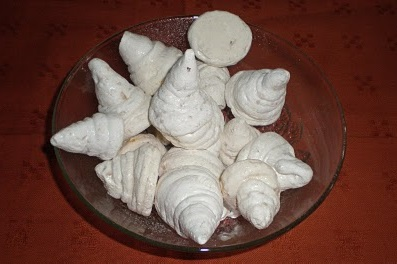
- Thoothukudi macaroon
- Alternative names: Tuticorin macaroon
- Type: Biscuit
- Course: Snack
- Place of origin: India
- Region or state: Tamil Nadu
- Main ingredients: Sugar, egg white and Cashew

A Thoothukudi macaroon (or Tuticorin) is a type of macaroon from the port town of Thoothukudi, in the India state of Tamil Nadu. Traditional European macaroons are made from egg whites, sugar, and ground almonds. In Thoothukudi, the almond was replaced with locally available cashew.

== History ==
Thoothukudi macaroons are basically European macaroons Indianised in Thoothukudi. The macaroon originated in France and Italy but has made its way to different parts of the world. Many of these regions have modified the recipe by adding or modifying the ingredients. Some of the regions have added grated coconut to add a local flavour. In Thooththukkudi almond was replaced with the locally available cashew. The Portuguese introduced the macaroon to India. It came via Ceylon, now Sri Lanka and reached Thooththukkudi, a port town in Tamil Nadu, South India.

== Method ==
Several bakeries in Thoothukudi manufacture the macaroon using the same century-old method. The process starts with the grinding of cashew nuts. The grinding is done in two batches. The first batch produces coarse cashew nut powder while the second batch produces a fine powder. The two types of paste add to the texture and taste of the final product. The two types of cashew powder are mixed with ground sugar in an electric mixer. Meanwhile, the egg white is separated from the yolk and stored. Finally the egg white is mixed with the mixture of ground cashew nuts and sugar. This is done by hand. The process is known as folding and adds air in the mixture. This gives the final product a fluffy texture. Finally, the mixture is ready and is poured into piping cones. The Thooththukkudi macaroon has a spiral cone-like appearance, resembling a modak more than its European counterpart. It follows a slow baking process for six hours with a temperature of 152 °C.
