= Ladurée =

French pastry company

Pâtisserie E. Ladurée
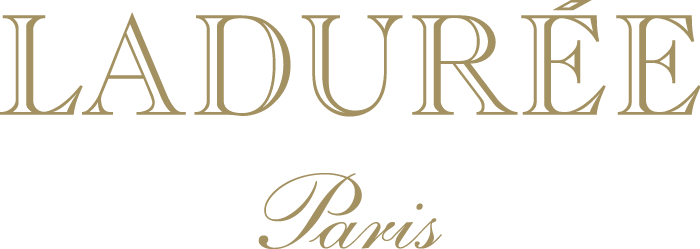
- Trade name: Ladurée
- Type: Private (SAS)
- Industry: Confectionery
- Genre: Pâtisserie
- Founded: 1862; 164 years ago in Paris, France
- Founder: Louis Ernest Ladurée
- Headquarters: Paris, France
- Number of locations: 129 (2024)
- Products: Pastries and candy
- Owner: Stéphane Courbit
- Website: laduree.com/en/

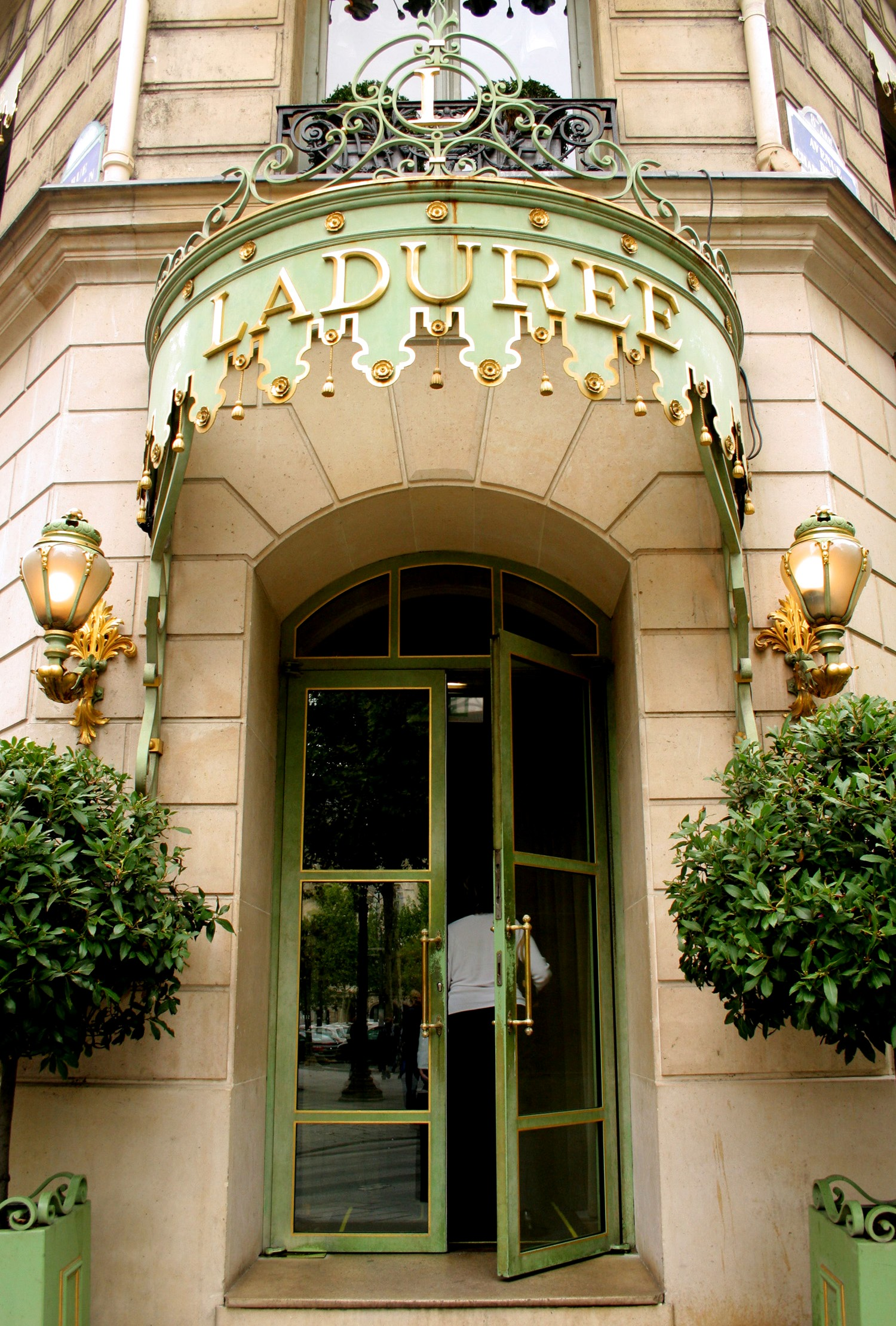
Celadon green façade at the Champs-Élysées flagship

The queue inside Ladurée's Champs-Élysées flagship

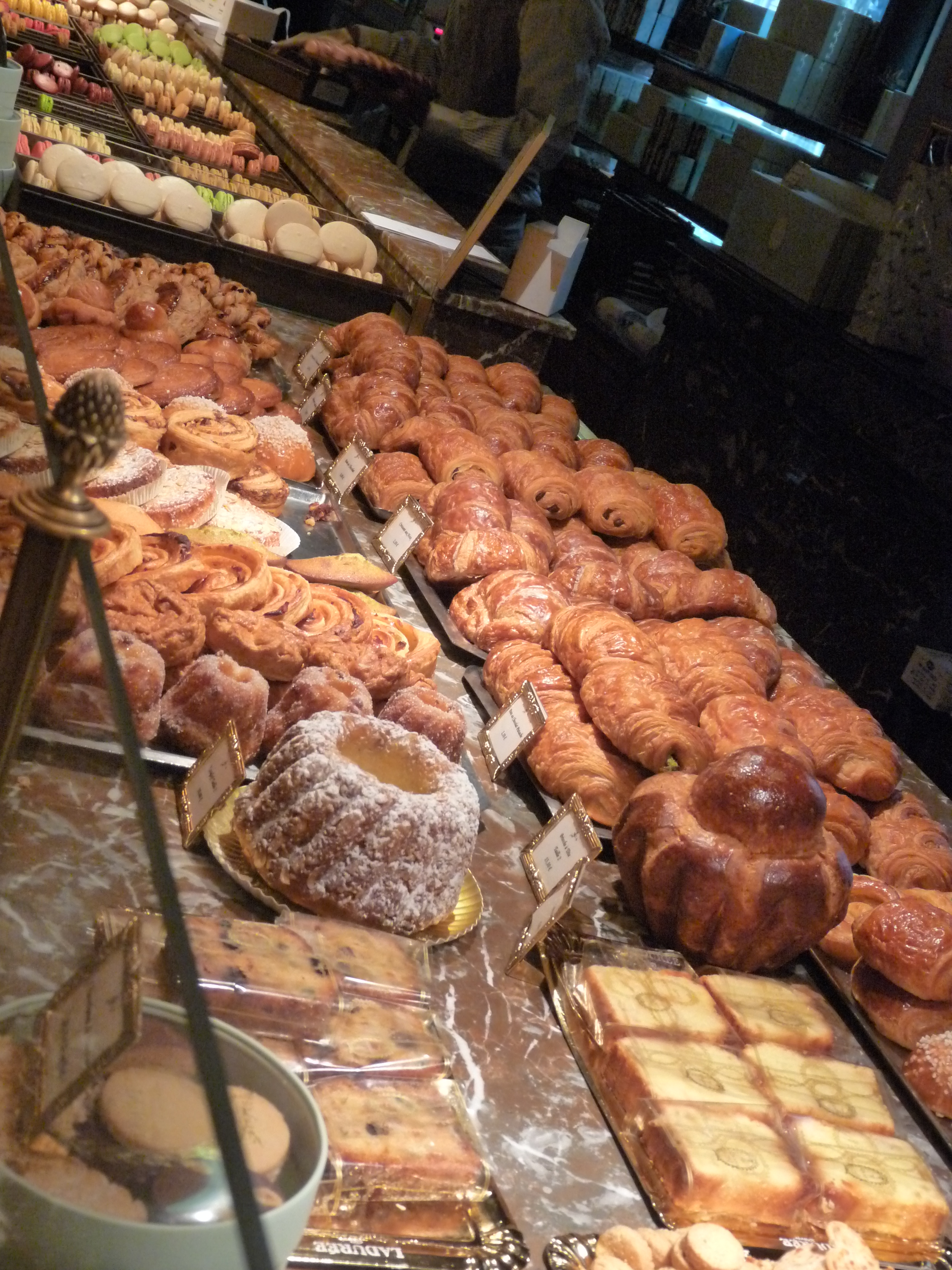
Pastries on display in the Champs-Élysées flagship

Pâtisserie E. Ladurée, commonly known as Ladurée (French pronunciation: [ladyʁe]), is a French manufacturer and retailer of high-end pastries and candy, established in 1862. Ladurée is well known throughout the world for its macarons. The company is a société par actions simplifiée (simplified joint stock corporation) and has its head office in Paris, France.

== Early years ==
Louis Ernest Ladurée, a miller, founded a bakery in 1862 on the rue Royale, Paris. During the Paris Commune uprising of 1871, the bakery was burnt down. A pastry shop was built at the same location, and Jules Chéret was entrusted with the interior decoration. The chubby cherubs dressed as pastry cooks, painted by him on the ceiling, form the company's emblem. The interior of the premises were painted in the same celadon colour as the façade.

Ladurée's rise to fame came in 1930 when his little cousin, Pierre Desfontaines, had the original idea of the double-decker, sticking two macaron shells together with a creamy ganache as filling. Queen Catherine de' Medici had brought the macaron to France from Italy in the 16th century, and the recipe for the biscuit had hardly varied over the years, but the amounts of the ingredients used and the appearance of the end product were up to the individual bakers.

French pastry chef Pierre Hermé helped orchestrate the expansion of Ladurée: "In one year Ladurée went from a little bakery in the eighth district of Paris to a big brand name. When I arrived, there was not a lot of organization. I really brought the savoir-faire to the company. When I arrived, they didn't have a logo."

== Recent history ==
In 1993, Groupe Holder took over Ladurée. The Holder family also owns the PAUL bakery chain in France. Following the takeover, the company began an expansion drive to turn Ladurée from the single rue Royale bakery into a chain, setting up pastry shops and tea rooms on the Champs-Élysées and in Le Printemps Haussmann in 1997, followed by Ladurée Bonaparte in 2002.

The international development of Ladurée started in 2005 with London, in the Harrods department store. In 1997, two shops opened in Paris – the first on the Champs-Élysées, next to its tea room, decorated by Jacques Garcia, and the second in the rue Bonaparte, decorated by Roxane Rodriguez. A shop opened in 2006 in London, also decorated by Roxane Rodriguez. The takeaway models of the rue Bonaparte and Harrods stores were exported to their other locations.

Ladurée stores are now also present in Canada, Belgium, India, Ireland, Japan, Kuwait, Luxembourg, Monaco, Qatar, Saudi Arabia, Switzerland, the United Arab Emirates, the United Kingdom, and the United States.

In 2012, Ladurée released a makeup collection inspired by the colours of their macarons. It became available in Japan in February 2012, and in Europe from November 2012.

In 2019, Ladurée switched to a vegan-only menu at their Beverly Hills location.

In March 2022 80% of Ladurée was bought by Stephane Courbit through Lov Group. Mélanie Carron became the new managing director, replacing David Holder, the son of the founder of the Holder group.

== Collaborations ==
In February 2014, Marie-Hélène de Taillac, a jewelry designer, collaborated with Ladurée to create sets of fashion macaron. The box containing the macarons depicts de Taillac's "Rainbow" necklace, featuring gold sequins and the piece's multicolored briolette gemstone. Ladurée had Marie-Hélène de Taillac-inspired window installations in its Tokyo, Paris, and New York City stores.

In 2018 fashion house Vera Wang produced a range of desserts in collaboration with Ladurée.

In 2021 the Italian designer LadoubleJ collaborated with Ladurėe to produce a porcelain collection.

In 2022 the American children's and party product company Meri Meri collaborated with Ladurée to produce a selection of French tea party decorations and accessories, including candles and dinner plates.

== In popular culture ==
Ladurée made the pastries for the film Marie Antoinette, directed by Sofia Coppola; its famous macarons can be seen in a scene between Marie Antoinette and Ambassador Mercy.

They can also be seen in The CW's hit teen drama Gossip Girl as Blair Waldorf's favorite pastries.

Ladurée regularly collaborate with fashion designers: in 2009 with Christian Louboutin, then the same year with Marni.

In 2011, Ladurée was chosen to conceive macarons for Albert II, Prince of Monaco and Charlene Wittstock's wedding.

== Locations ==
As of September 2024, Ladurée operates 5 stores in Africa, 44 stores in Asia, 66 stores in Europe, 15 stores in North America and 1 store in South America. They are listed below:

=== Europe ===
- Berlin, Germany (1)
- Cannes, France (1)
- Charles de Gaulle Airport, France (13)
- Chavannes-de-Bogis, Switzerland (1)
- Dublin, Ireland (2)
- Geneva, Switzerland (2)
- Giverny, France (1)
- Gordes, France (1)
- Hamburg, Germany (1)
- Heathrow Airport, England (1)
- Ingolstadt, Germany (1)
- Lausanne, Switzerland (1)
- London, England (8)
- Luxembourg City, Luxembourg (1)
- Manchester, England (1)
- Monte Carlo, Monaco (1)
- Munich, Germany (3)
- Nice Côte d'Azur Airport, Nice, France (1)
- Orly Airport, France (7)
- Paris, France (14)
- Serris, France (1)
- Saint-Laurent-du-Var, France (1)
- Saint-Tropez, France (1)
- Sliema, Malta (1)
- Versailles, France (1)

=== Africa ===
- Cairo, Egypt (2)
- El Sheikh Zayed City, Egypt (1)
- Giza, Egypt (1)
- New Cairo, Egypt (1)
- North Coast, Egypt (1)

=== Asia ===
- Abu Dhabi, United Arab Emirates (4)
- Doha, Qatar (6)
- Dubai, United Arab Emirates (6)
- Kuwait City, Kuwait (3)
- Kyoto, Japan (1)
- New Delhi, India (2)
- Mumbai, India (1)
- Muscat, Oman (2)
- Osaka, Japan (1)
- Pune, India (1)
- Riyadh, Saudi Arabia (2)
- Shanghai, China (3)
- Sharjah, United Arab Emirates (1)
- Tokyo, Japan (9)
- Yokohama, Japan (1)
- Manila, Philippines (1)
- Kolkata, India (1)

=== North America ===
- Beverly Hills, United States (1)
- Glendale, United States (1)
- Los Angeles, United States (1)
- Miami, United States (2)
- New York City, United States (5)
- Toronto, Canada (2)
- Vancouver, Canada (3)
- Mexico City, Mexico (1)
