= Société par actions simplifiée =

French type of business entity

Société par actions simplifiée (SAS; simplified joint-stock company in British English or simplified corporation in American English) is a French type of business entity. It is the first hybrid entity enacted under French law and based on common law principles rather than civil. It is similar to a limited liability company under United States law, as the Delaware LLC was the model used by the French government. The SAS is also similar to the limited company in British law, and most other hybrids, though the hybrid in civil-law countries is quite different because there is also a hybrid of common law principles applied.

A société par actions simplifiée has its annual statements audited by an independent body and published. The head of a société par actions simplifiée is its président. However, unlike the société anonyme, it does not have a board. The président is also responsible for the operation of the company. The company may also have a directeur général (managing director), who has the same authority as the président with respect to third parties. The président can be either a physical person or a corporation, if there is only one shareholder. An SAS with only one shareholder is known as a société par actions simplifiée unipersonnelle (SASU).

The société par actions simplifiée form of organization is useful for companies that are wholly owned subsidiaries of another company, often a publicly traded corporation, since it does not need a complex capital equity structure. An example of this is European aerospace giant Airbus, which is an SAS wholly owned by a Dutch-based societas Europaea of the same name. It is also useful for companies held by families or small, close-knit groups of families. For example, the Louis Dreyfus Group, a trading conglomerate, is held in this manner by members of the Louis-Dreyfus family.
