= Gettman Hollow =

Valley in the American state of Missouri

Gettman Hollow is a valley in Taney County in the Ozarks of southwestern Missouri. Gettman Hollow is a tributary to Bull Creek.

The head of the valley is located at 36°45′57″N 93°08′06″W and its confluence is at 36°44′57″N 93°10′16″W. The stream begins as a mountainside spring. The stream flows to the southwest and joins Bull Creek about 1.5 miles northeast of Walnut Shade.

The name was sometimes spelled "Getman Hollow". The valley has the name of the local Getman family.
