= Gravelly Hollow =

Valley in the American state of Missouri

Gravelly Hollow is a valley in northern Taney County in the Ozarks of southwest Missouri. The stream in the valley is a tributary to Bull Creek.

The headwaters of the stream is at 36°48′01″N 93°07′02″W and the confluence with Bull Creek is at 36°48′03″N 93°10′54″W. The stream source area lies adjacent to Missouri Route H at approximately 1150 feet and the confluence about four miles to the west is at 837 feet.

Gravelly Hollow was so named on account of deposits of gravel within the valley.
