= Bonniebrook Homestead =

- U.S. National Register of Historic Places
- Location within Missouri Location within the United States
- Location: U.S. Route 65, near Walnut Shade, Missouri
- Coordinates: 36°46′24″N 93°13′11″W
- Area: 172 acres (70 ha)
- Built: 1893
- NRHP reference No.: 84002720
- Added to NRHP: May 29, 1997

Bonniebrook Homestead is a historic homestead site located near Walnut Shade, Taney County, Missouri. It was a pioneer homestead of the O'Neills, the first family to enter the land from the public domain as a Homestead property. It was the Ozark home of Rose O'Neill (1874–1944), inventor of the kewpie doll and illustrator of "sweet monsters". She is buried on the site in the O'Neill family cemetery. Rose O'Neill named the estate after the stream that ran near the family's original cabin. The homestead burned down in January 1947. The building that exists now is a reconstruction of the original home. The Bonniebrook Historical Society began reconstructing the homestead in 1975 with construction completing on the 14-room building in 1993. The reconstructed building is furnished in the style typical of the era when the O'Neill family occupied the estate. The property now consists of the reconstructed homestead, Bonniebrook Art Gallery, Kewpie Museum, gift shop, research library and Rose O'Neill archives

It was listed on the National Register of Historic Places in 1997.
