= Eaudevie, Missouri =

Extinct town in Missouri, U.S.

Eaudevie is an extinct town in southern Christian County, in the U.S. state of Missouri. The community was located along the east bank of Bull Creek at 36°50′30″N 93°10′59″W at an elevation of 900 feet. U.S. 65 passes two miles west of the location.

A post office was established at Eaudevie in 1904, and remained in operation until 1929. Eaudevie was established as a spa, with its name a translation from the French language, meaning "water of life".
