= Branson Cross =

Religious structure in Missouri, USA

Coordinates: 36°45′6.76″N 93°13′29.58″W

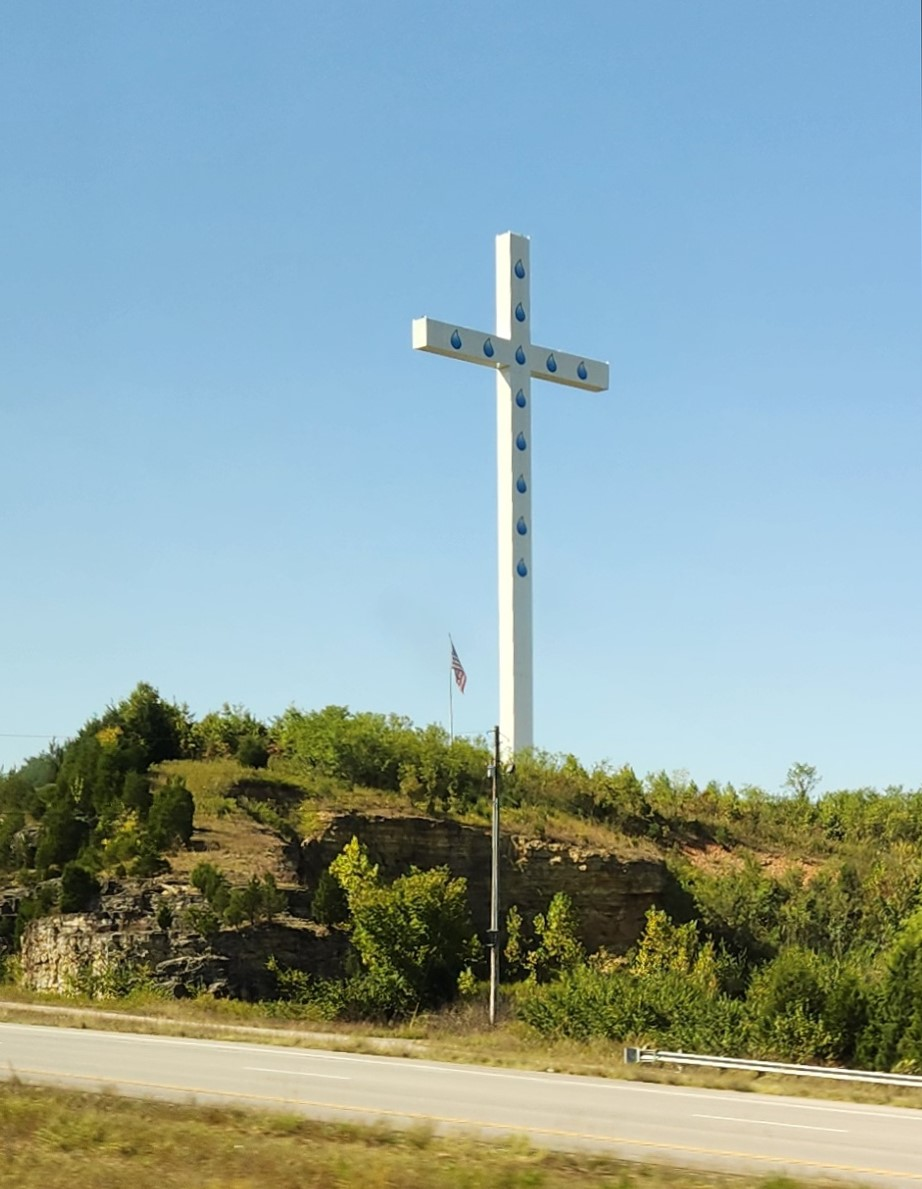
- Branson Cross, view from U.S. Route 65
- Interactive map of Branson Cross
- Location: Walnut Shade, Branson, Missouri, United States
- Designer: Kerry Brown
- Material: 1-inch thick plate steel
- Height: 218 ft (66 m)
- Beginning date: August, 2018
- Completion date: September, 2018
- Opening date: April 21, 2019
- Dedicated to: Jesus Christ

Branson Cross is a large structure in the shape of a cross located in Walnut Shade, Missouri near Branson, Missouri. At 218 feet (66.45m) tall, it is claimed to be the largest cross in North America. The cross is among the ten largest such structures in the world. The Branson Lakes Area Chamber of Commerce held a ceremony in April, 2019 to declare the monument open to the public.

== Design and symbolism ==
The cross is painted white with blue teardrop shaped embellishments. The designer explained that the vertical teardrops are "representative of new beginnings" and a reference to the eight people saved in Noah's Ark. The horizontal teardrops reflect the suffering of Jesus Christ during his crucifixion, with "3 nail wounds, the spear in the side and the crown of thorns".

== Construction ==
Construction began in August 2018. The cross was originally planned to be built on a 16-acre plot of land, however a further 14-acres of adjacent land were subsequently purchased during the construction phase. The cross is constructed from one inch thick plate steel, and is composed of eight sections with bolts securing it in place. The cross can withstand gusts of wind up to 75 miles per hour. The construction of the cross cost at least $3 million, largely funded through gifts and donations by the public. Alabama Roll Products produced and manufactured all parts to be distributed by the erecting company. The cross was assembled and installed by Headrick's Cross Company, a fabrication and installation firm that has worked on similar cruciform monument projects elsewhere. According to the fabricator, the cross weighs 450,000 pounds (204.12 metric tonnes).
