= Rose O'Neill =

American illustrator (1874–1944)

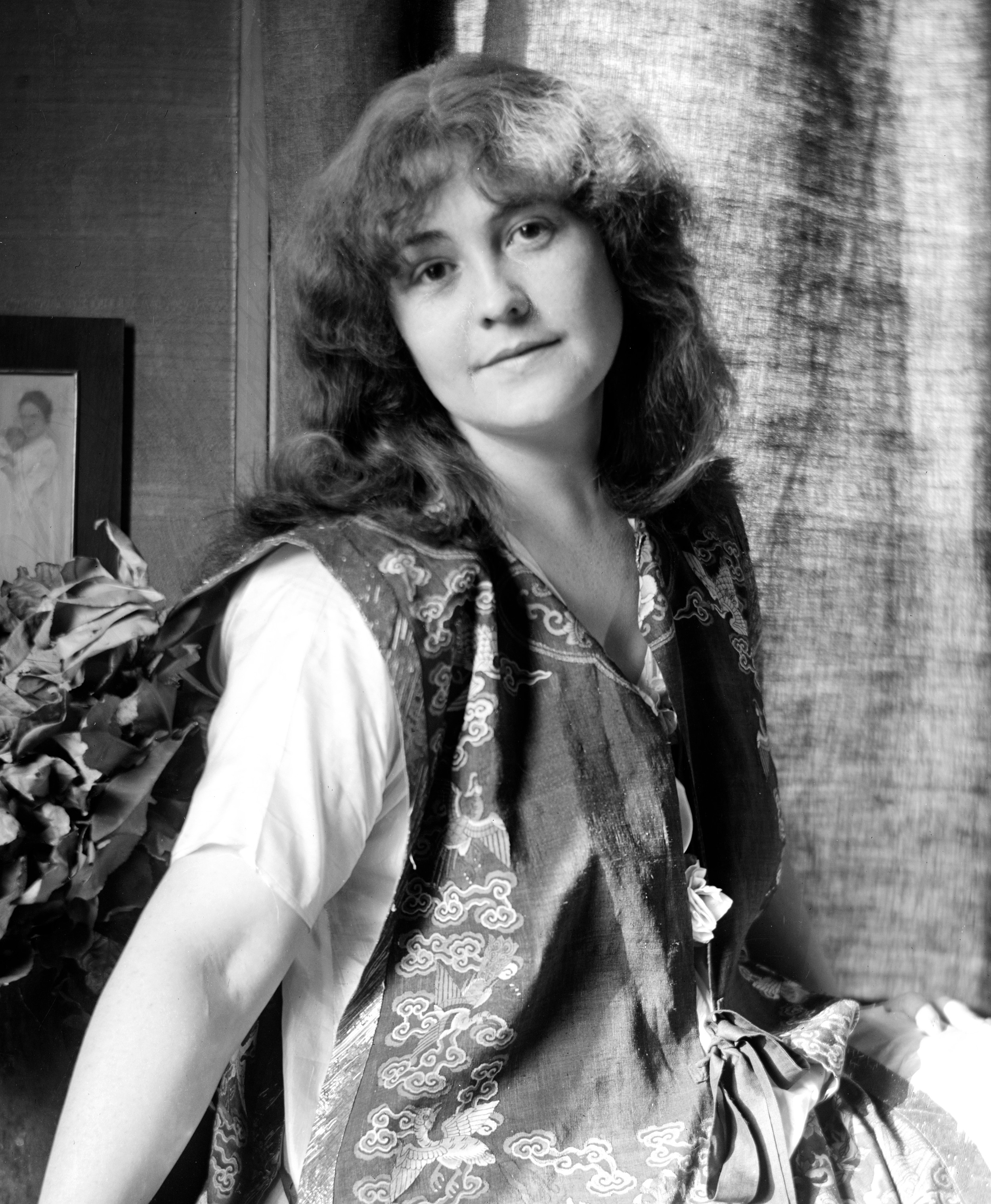
- O'Neill in c. 1907
- Born: Rose Cecil O'Neill; June 25, 1874 Wilkes-Barre, Pennsylvania, U.S.
- Died: April 6, 1944 (aged 69) Springfield, Missouri, U.S.
- Areas: Cartoonist; writer; artist
- Notable works: Kewpie
- Spouses: Gray Latham (m. 1896–1901) Harry Leon Wilson (m. 1902; div. 1907)

Rose Cecil O'Neill (June 25, 1874 – April 6, 1944) was an American cartoonist, illustrator, artist, and writer. She rose to fame for her creation of the popular comic strip characters, Kewpies, in 1909, and was also the first published female cartoonist in the United States.

The daughter of a book salesman and a homemaker, O'Neill was raised in rural Nebraska. She exhibited interest in the arts at an early age, and sought a career as an illustrator in New York City. Her Kewpie cartoons, which made their debut in a 1909 issue of Ladies' Home Journal, were later manufactured as bisque dolls in 1912 by J. D. Kestner, a German toy company, followed by composition material and celluloid versions. The dolls were wildly popular in the early twentieth century, and are considered to be one of the first mass-marketed toys in the United States.

O'Neill also wrote several novels and books of poetry, and was active in the women's suffrage movement. She was for a time the highest-paid female illustrator in the world upon the success of the Kewpie dolls. O'Neill has been inducted into the National Women's Hall of Fame.

In 2022 at San Diego Comic-Con, Rose O'Neill was inducted into the Eisner Awards Hall of Fame as a Comic Pioneer.

== Early life ==
O'Neill was born on June 25, 1874, in Wilkes-Barre, Pennsylvania, the daughter of William Patrick, an Irish immigrant, and Alice Asenath "Meemie" Smith O'Neill. She had two younger sisters, Lee and Callista, and three younger brothers: Hugh, James, and Clarence. The family moved to rural Nebraska while O'Neill was young. From early childhood, she expressed significant interest in the arts, immersing herself in drawing, painting, and sculpture. At thirteen, she entered a children's drawing competition sponsored by the Omaha Herald and won first prize for her drawing, titled "Temptation Leading to an Abyss".

Within two years, O'Neill was providing illustrations for the local Omaha publications Excelsior and The Great Divide as well as other periodicals, having secured this work with help from the editor at the Omaha World-Herald and the Art Director from Everybody Magazine who had judged the competition. The income helped support her family, which her father had struggled to support as a bookseller. O'Neill attended the Sacred Heart Convent school in Omaha.

== Career ==
=== Move to New York ===
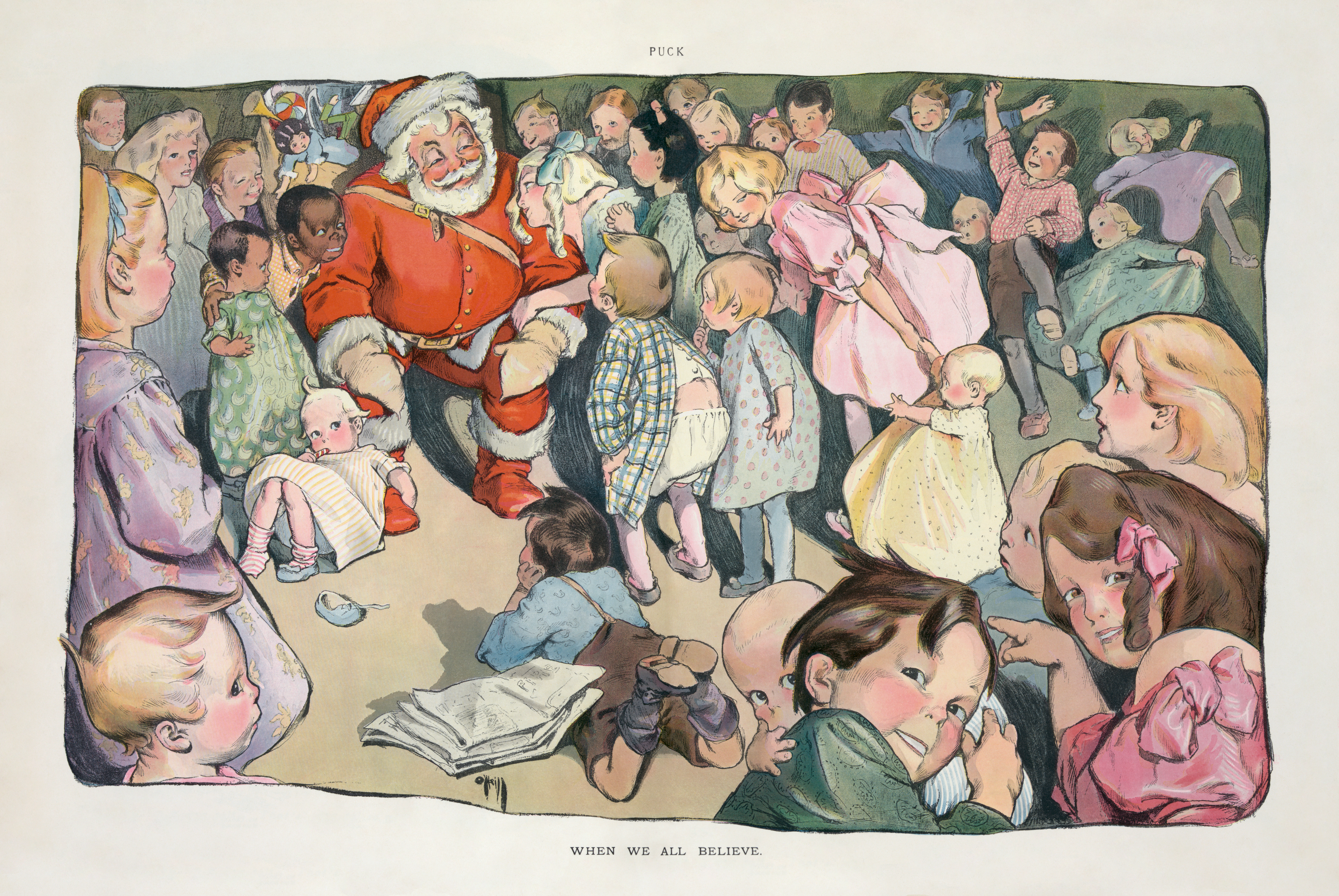
"When We All Believe": An illustration of children surrounding Santa Claus for the 1903 issue of Puck

To market her skills to a broader audience, O'Neill moved to New York in 1893; she stopped in Chicago en route to visit the World Columbian Exposition. The nuns accompanied her to various publishers to sell work from her portfolio of sixty drawings. She was able to sell her drawings to numerous publishing houses and began taking orders for more. A four-panel comic strip by O'Neill was featured in a September 19, 1896, issue of Truth magazine, making her the first American woman to publish a comic strip.

While O'Neill was living in New York, her father made a homestead claim on a small tract of land in the Ozarks wilderness of southern Missouri. The tract had a "dog-trot" cabin with two log cabins (one was used for eating and the other for sleeping) and a breezeway between. A year later when O'Neill visited the land, it had become known as "Bonniebrook". During this time O'Neill was experiencing considerable success, having joined the staff of Puck, an American humor magazine, where she was the only female on staff. In 1909, she began work drawing advertisements for Jell-O, and contributed illustrations to Harper's and Life magazines.

=== Early illustrations ===
In 1892, while in Omaha, O'Neill met a young Virginian named Gray Latham, whom she married in 1896. He visited O'Neill in New York City, and continued writing to her when she went to Missouri to see her family. After Latham's father went to Mexico to make films, he went to Bonniebrook in 1896. Concerned with the welfare of her family, O'Neill sent much of her paycheck home.

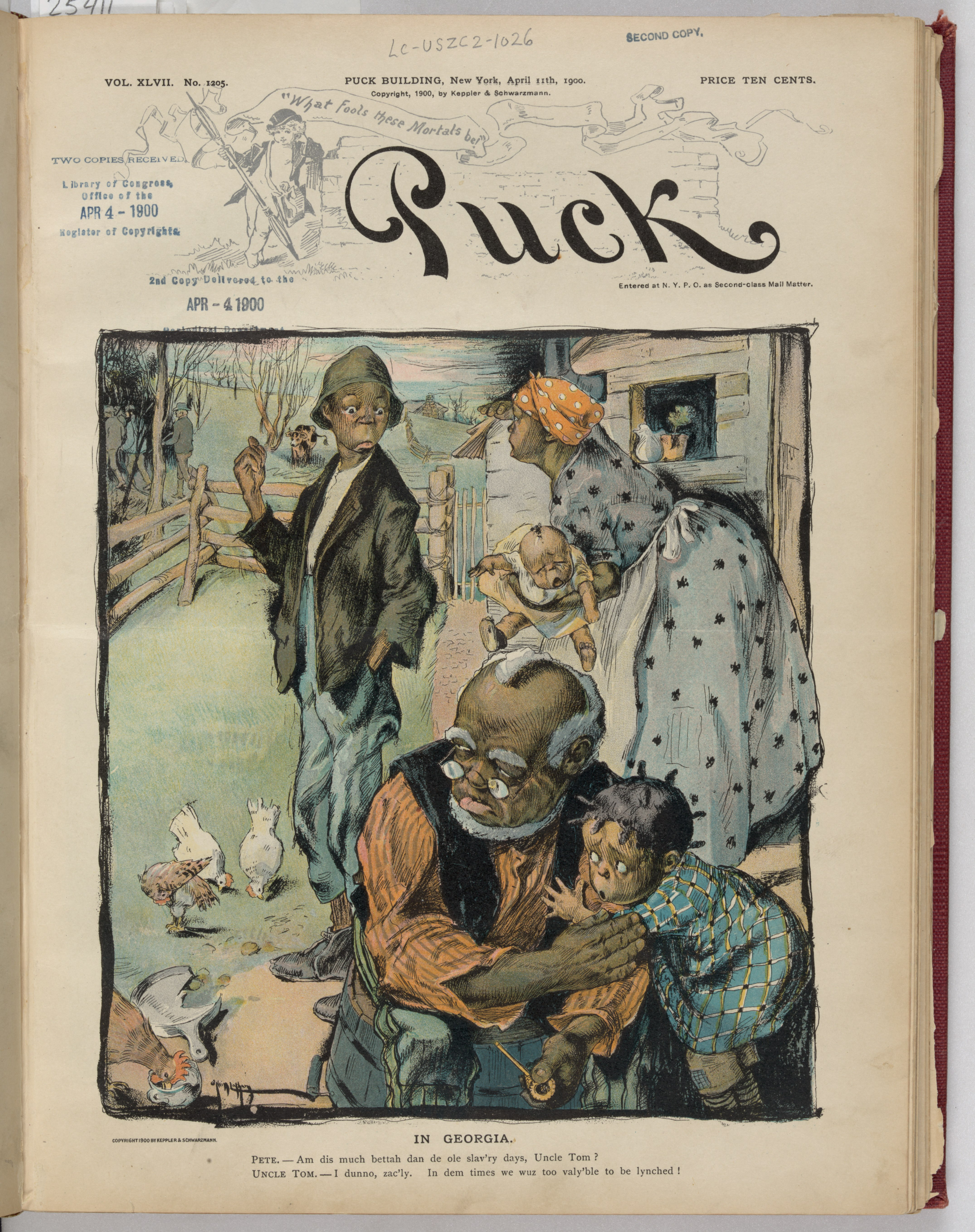

In the following years O'Neill became unhappy with Latham, as he liked "living large" and gambling, and was known as a playboy. O'Neill found that Latham, with his very expensive tastes, had spent her paychecks on himself. O'Neill then moved to Taney County, Missouri, where she filed for divorce in 1901, returning to Bonniebrook. Latham died the same year, and some sources state that O'Neill was widowed.

In late 1901, O'Neill began receiving anonymous letters and gifts in the mail. She learned that they were sent by Harry Leon Wilson, an assistant editor at Puck. O'Neill and Wilson became romantically involved soon after, and married in 1902. After a honeymoon in Colorado, they moved to Bonniebrook, where they lived for the next several winters. During the first three years Wilson wrote two novels, The Lions of the Lord (1903) and The Boss of Little Arcady (1905), both of which O'Neill drew illustrations for. One of Wilson's later novels, Ruggles of Red Gap, became popular and was made into several motion pictures, including a silent movie, a "talkie" starring Charles Laughton, and then a remake called Fancy Pants starring Lucille Ball and Bob Hope. The couple divorced in 1907.

In 1904, O'Neill published her first novel, The Loves of Edwy, which she also illustrated. A review published by Book News in 1905 considered O'Neill's illustrations to "possess a rare breadth of sympathy with and understanding of humanity".

=== Kewpies and breakthrough ===
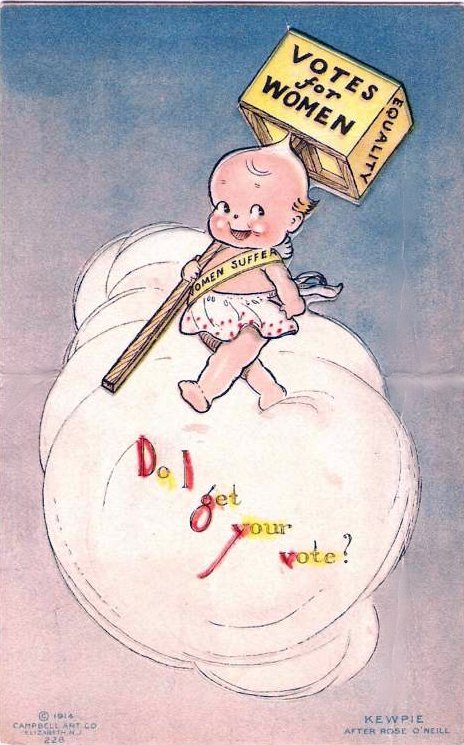
Kewpie votes for women postcard, 1914

As educational opportunities were made available in the 19th century, women artists became part of professional enterprises, and some founded their own art associations. Artwork made by women was considered to be inferior, and to help overcome that stereotype women became, according to art historian Laura Prieto, "increasingly vocal and confident" in promoting women's work. Many women artists, including O'Neill, could be characterized as examples of the educated, modern, and independent New Woman. According to Prieto, artists "played crucial roles in representing the New Woman, both by drawing images of the icon and exemplifying this emerging type through their own lives". In the late 19th century and early 20th century, about 88% of the subscribers of 11,000 magazines and periodicals were women. As women entered the artist community, publishers hired women to create illustrations that depicted the world from a woman's perspective. Other successful illustrators were Jennie Augusta Brownscombe, Jessie Willcox Smith, Elizabeth Shippen Green, and Violet Oakley.

It was amid the New Woman and burgeoning suffragist movements that, in 1908, O'Neill began to concentrate on producing original artwork, and it was during this period that she created the whimsical Kewpie characters for which she became known. Their name, "Kewpie", derives from Cupid, the Roman god of love. According to O'Neill, she became obsessed with the idea of the cherubic characters, to the point that she had dreams about them: "I thought about the Kewpies so much that I had a dream about them where they were all doing acrobatic pranks on the coverlet of my bed. One sat in my hand." She described them as "a sort of little round fairy whose one idea is to teach people to be merry and kind at the same time". The Kewpie characters made their debut in comic strip form in 1909 in an issue of Ladies' Home Journal. Further publications of the Kewpie comics in Woman's Home Companion and Good Housekeeping helped the cartoon grow in popularity rapidly.

In 1913, German doll manufacturer Kestner & Co. began making Kewpie dolls. The dolls were immediately successful, and more companies were licensed to produce them in order to meet demand. O'Neill repeatedly visited Germany to supervise the doll manufacturers. As O'Neill rose to fame, she garnered a public reputation as a bohemian, and became an ardent women's rights advocate. The success of the Kewpies amassed her a fortune of $1.4 million, with which she purchased properties including Bonniebrook, an apartment in Washington Square Park in Greenwich Village, Castle Carabas in Connecticut, and Villa Narcissus (bought from Charles Caryl Coleman) on the Isle of Capri, Italy. At the height of the Kewpie success, O'Neill was the highest-paid female illustrator in the world. O'Neill was well known in New York City's artistic circles, and through her association, she was the inspiration for the song "Rose of Washington Square".

=== Paris and later career ===
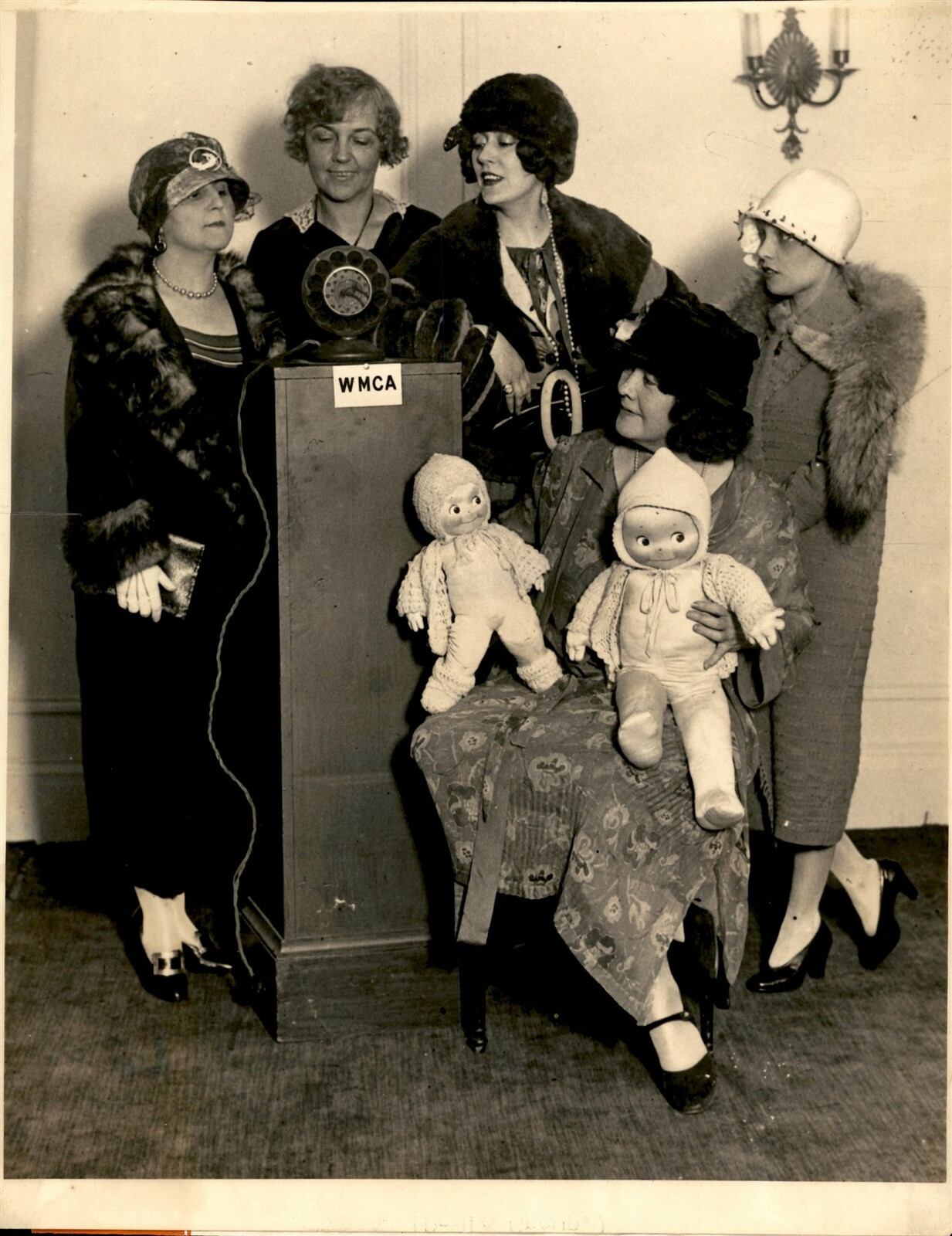
Nina Morgan, Jackie Wilbur, Olga Petrova, Anita Loos, Rose O’Neill, Women’s Arts And Industries Exposition Sept. 24, 1925.

O'Neill continued working, even at her wealthiest, exploring many different types of art. She learned sculpture at the hand of Auguste Rodin and had several exhibitions of sculptures and paintings in Paris and the United States. These works were more experimental in nature, and largely influenced by dreams and mythology. O'Neill spent 1921 to 1926 living in Paris. While there, she was elected to the Société Coloniale des Artistes Français in 1921, and had exhibitions of her sculptures at the Galerie Devambez in Paris and the Wildenstein Galleries in New York in 1921 and 1922, respectively.

In 1927, O'Neill returned to the United States, and by 1937 was living at Bonniebrook permanently. By the 1940s, she had lost the majority of her money and properties, partly through extravagant spending, as well as the cost of fully supporting her family, her entourage of "artistic" hangers-on, and her first husband. The Great Depression also hurt O'Neill's fortune. During that period, O'Neill was dismayed to find that her work was no longer in demand. After thirty years of popularity, the Kewpie character phenomenon had faded, and photography was replacing illustration as a commercial vehicle. O'Neill experimented with crafting a new doll, eventually creating Little Ho Ho, which was a laughing baby Buddha. However, before plans could be finalized for production of the new little figure, the factory burned to the ground.

== Personal life ==
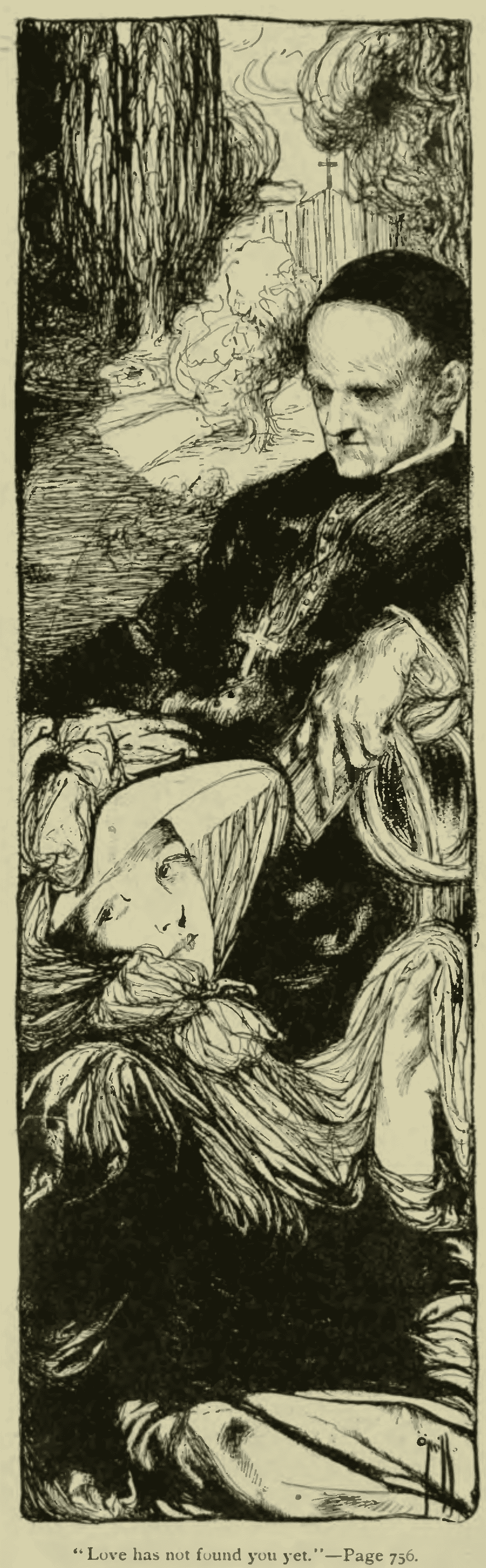
Page 757, Scribner's Magazine 1908. Extract from scan of illustration for the story "Phyllida" by Temple Bailey.

O'Neill became a prominent personality in the Branson, Missouri community donating her time and pieces of artwork to the School of the Ozarks at Point Lookout, Missouri, and remaining active in the local art community.

On April 6, 1944, O'Neill died of heart failure resulting from paralysis at the home of her nephew in Springfield, Missouri. She is interred in the family cemetery at Bonniebrook Homestead, next to her mother and several family members. Bonniebrook Homestead was listed on the National Register of Historic Places in 1997.

In 2025, O'Neill was posthumously inducted into the Luzerne County Arts & Entertainment Hall of Fame.

== Published works ==
=== As author and illustrator ===
- The Loves of Edwy (Boston: Lothrop, 1904)
- The Lady in the White Veil (New York: Harper and Brothers, 1909)
- The Kewpies and Dottie Darling (New York: George H. Doran, 1912)
- The Kewpies: Their Book, Verse and Poetry (New York: Frederick A. Stokes, 1913)
- The Kewpie Kutouts (1914)
- The Kewpie Primer (1916)
- The Master-Mistress (New York: Knopf, 1922)
- Kewpies and the Runaway Baby (New York: Doubleday, Doran, 1928)
- Garda (New York: Doubleday, Doran, 1929)
- The Goblin Woman (New York: Doubleday, Doran, 1930)

=== Illustrator only ===
- The Lions of the Lord by Harry Leon Wilson (Boston: Lothrop, 1903)
- The Boss of Little Arcady by Harry Leon Wilson (Boston: Lothrop, 1905)
- The Hickory Limb by Parker Hoysted Fillmore (New York: John Lane Co., 1910)
- Our Baby’s Book (New York: Woman's Home Companion, 1914)
- A Little Question of Ladies’ Rights by Parker Hoysted Fillmore (New York: John Lane Co., 1916)
- Tomorrow's House; or The Tiny Angel by George O'Neil (New York: E. P. Dutton, 1930) – brother–sister collaboration
- Sing a Song of Safety by Irving Caesar (New York: I. Caesar, 1937)
