= Bear Creek (Bull Creek tributary) =

Stream in Missouri, U.S.

Bear Creek is a stream in Christian and Taney counties in the Ozarks of southern Missouri. It is a tributary of Bull Creek.

The stream headwaters are at 36°51′01″N 93°19′42″W and the confluence with Bull Creek is at 36°43′49″N 93°11′47″W at an elevation of 735 ft (224 m). The source area for the stream is in the southwest corner of Christian County adjacent to U.S. Route 160 about two miles southwest of Spokane. The stream flows south and southeast and flows under U.S. Route 65 along Bear Creek Road. It crosses under US 160 and enters Bull Creek just southwest of Walnut Shade.
