= Schmidt's Candy =

American chocolate company

Schmidt's Candy is a chocolatery selling hand crafted and hand dipped chocolates and confections. It began as a soda fountain in 1925 under the elevated train on Jamaica Ave in Woodhaven, Queens.

== History ==
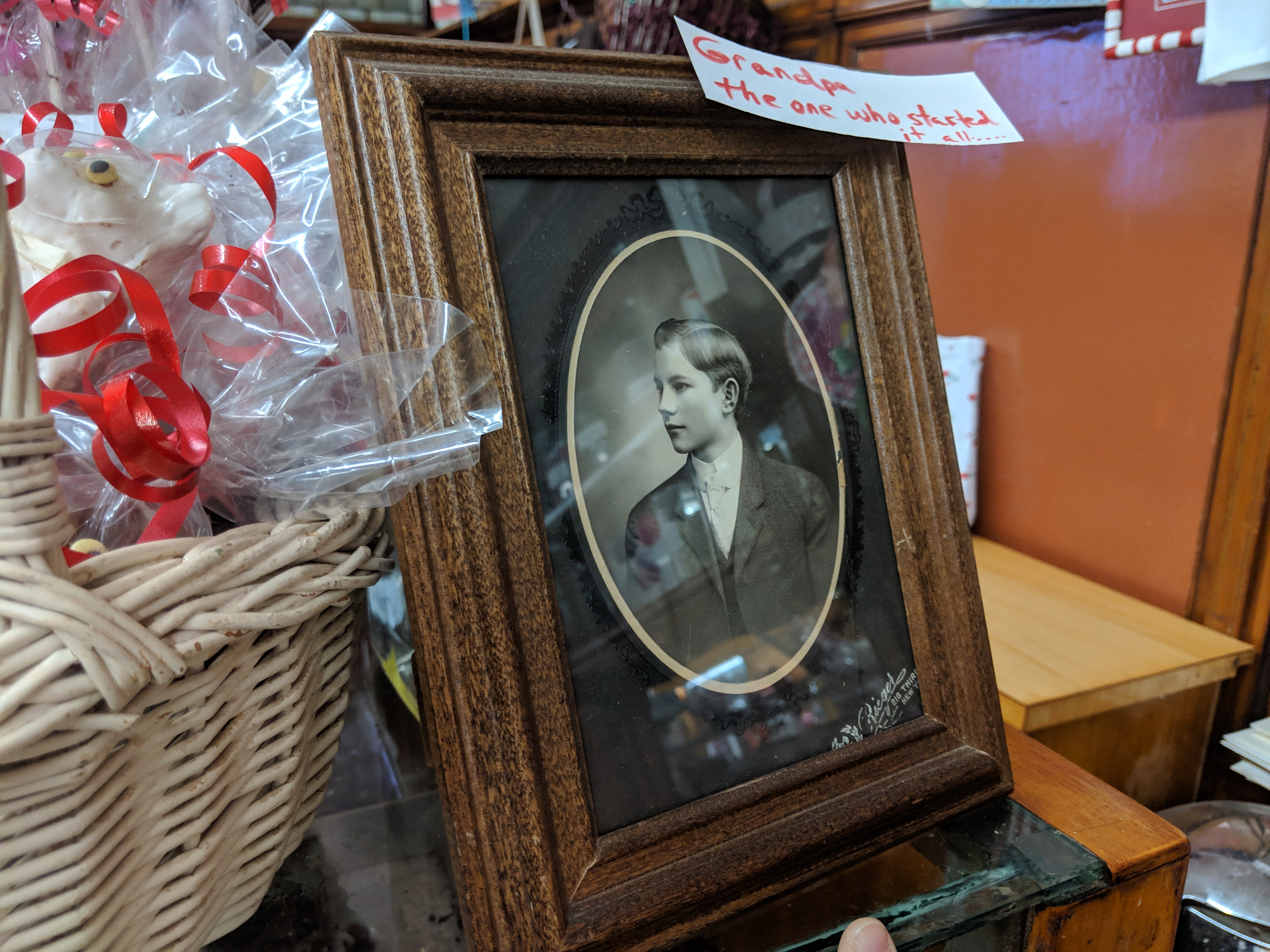
Frank Schmidt Sr.

In 1925 the BMT took over operation of the “El” on Jamaica Avenue and Frank Schmidt opened the soda fountain under the station at Woodhaven Boulevard. His intent was to use old-world chocolate recipes and was following a business plan he found in a pamphlet entitled ’67 tested ways for you to make money’. The business changed over the years and evolved into hand crafting chocolate confections with fine ingredients, the soda fountain is long gone but the prohibition era showcases still hold trays of confections and candy jars line the counters. His granddaughter Margie Schmidt is the current proprietor, having taken over from the second generation, (Frank Jr.) in 1986.

The shop is a local landmark in Woodhaven featuring new and vintage molds of kewpie dolls, chocolate bunnies and hearts along with build your own gift boxes that are populated with your own choices. The counters were originally from other stores on the avenue, Meyer Luncheonette and Wilkins Ice Cream parlor. The molds for many creations date back to the 1920s and 1930s.

The stretch of Jamaica Avenue in the 1940s and 1950s had soda fountains and Ice Cream Parlors on nearly every block (Popp's, Wilken's, Meyer's, Muller's, Grader's, Sam & Rose's, Behren's, Schmidt's on 94th, Wrede's); Soda fountains and luncheonettes fell out of favor in the 1980s leaving this candy store reminiscent of earlier times frozen in place under the elevated J train.

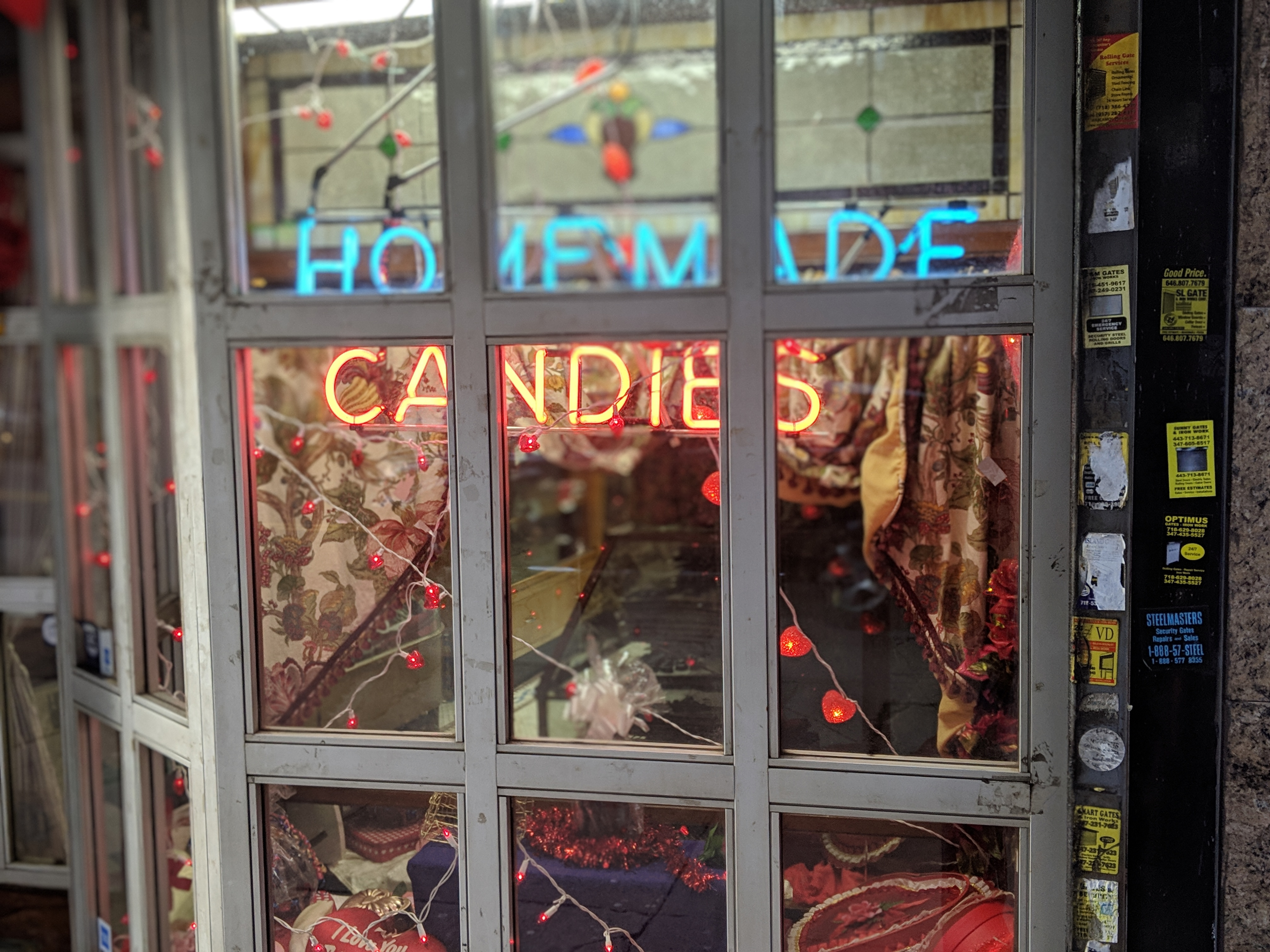
Handmade confectioners

== See also ==
- List of German desserts
