= Chocolaterie =

Company that manufactures chocolates and sells them directly

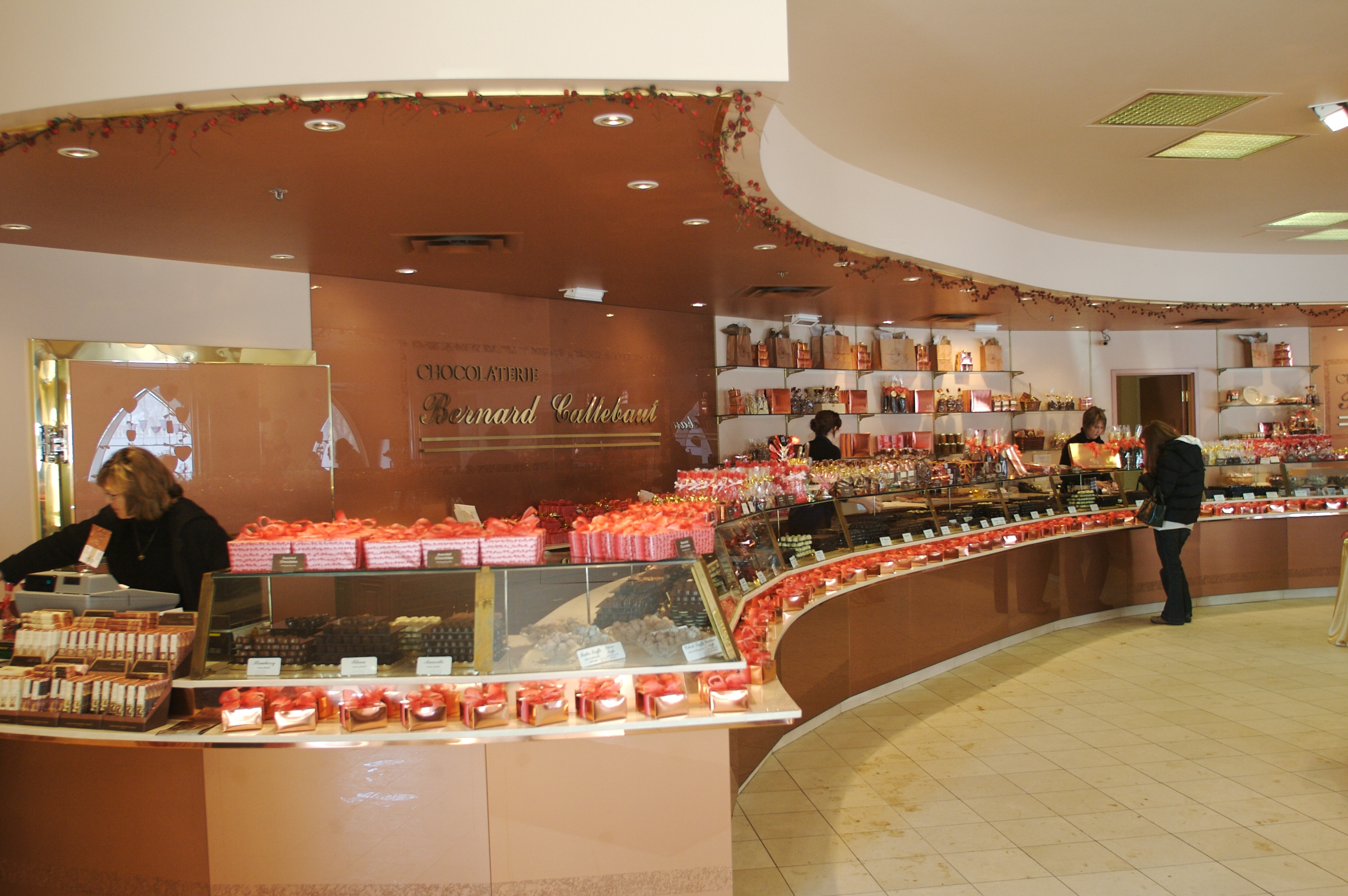
Chocolaterie Bernard Callebaut

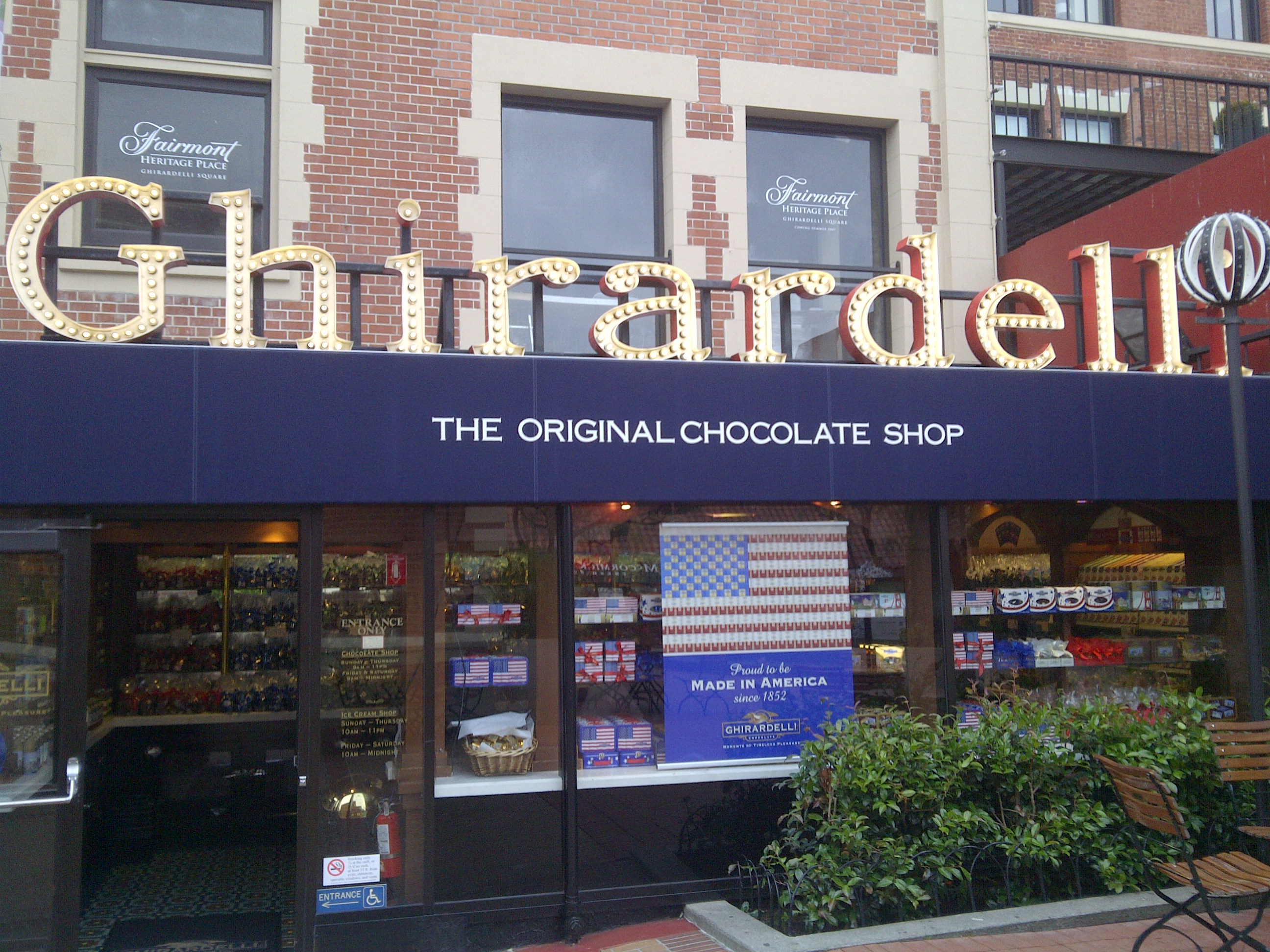
Ghirardelli Chocolate Company, San Francisco, a chocolate shop and manufacturer

A chocolaterie is a type of business which both manufactures chocolate confections and sells them, at the same location. It is usually a small family business, often operating at only one location. The word is of French origin, and shops named as such are common in France and Belgium. The term is also used to designate larger chocolate production companies, such as Chocolaterie Guylian, many of which started as smaller shops. This type of store operates in other countries, such as the US, Canada, the UK and Germany, sometimes using the French term. Stores which sell candies and chocolate but do not produce their own brand are called confectionery stores, or other names depending on the region. The related occupational term is chocolatier, though this term is also used sometimes to describe chocolateries, such as Godiva Chocolatier.

== History ==
Until the discovery of the New World, the cacao tree was unknown to Europeans. The Spanish were the first to bring cocoa beans to Europe along with cocoa grinding equipment. In the 18th century, the invention of the hydraulic press by Doret and the steam-driven chocolate mill by Dubuisson allowed for the beginning of mass production of chocolate.

The first chocolaterie opened in Paris in 1659.

== Usage ==
As an example of the term's usage, the novel Charlie and the Chocolate Factory was entitled Charlie et la Chocolaterie in France. The novel and 2000 film Chocolat are set in a chocolaterie.

== See also ==
- Candy making
- Schmidt's Candy
- List of chocolatiers – a biographical list of chocolatiers
- List of bean-to-bar chocolate manufacturers

Businesses which produce and sell foods at one location:

- Brewpubs
- Coffeehouses – also roast coffee beans on the premises
