= Walnut Shade, Missouri =

Unincorporated community in Missouri, U.S.

Coordinates: 36°43′57″N 93°11′37″W

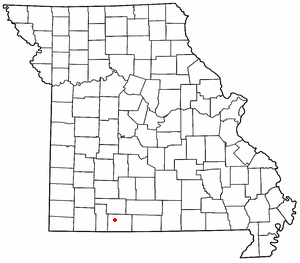

Walnut Shade is an unincorporated community in Taney County, Missouri, United States. It is located approximately six miles northwest of Forsyth on U.S. Route 160. The town sits at the confluence of Bull and Bear Creeks. Walnut Shade is part of the Branson, Missouri Micropolitan Statistical Area. The ZIP Code for Walnut Shade is 65771.

A post office called Walnut Shade has been in operation since 1860. The community once had Walnut Shade Schoolhouse, now defunct. The name "Walnut Shade" is commendatory.

Bonniebrook Homestead was listed on the National Register of Historic Places in 1997.

Walnut Shade is the site of the Branson Cross, the largest cross monument in North America.
