= Kewpie =

Dolls popular in the early 20th century

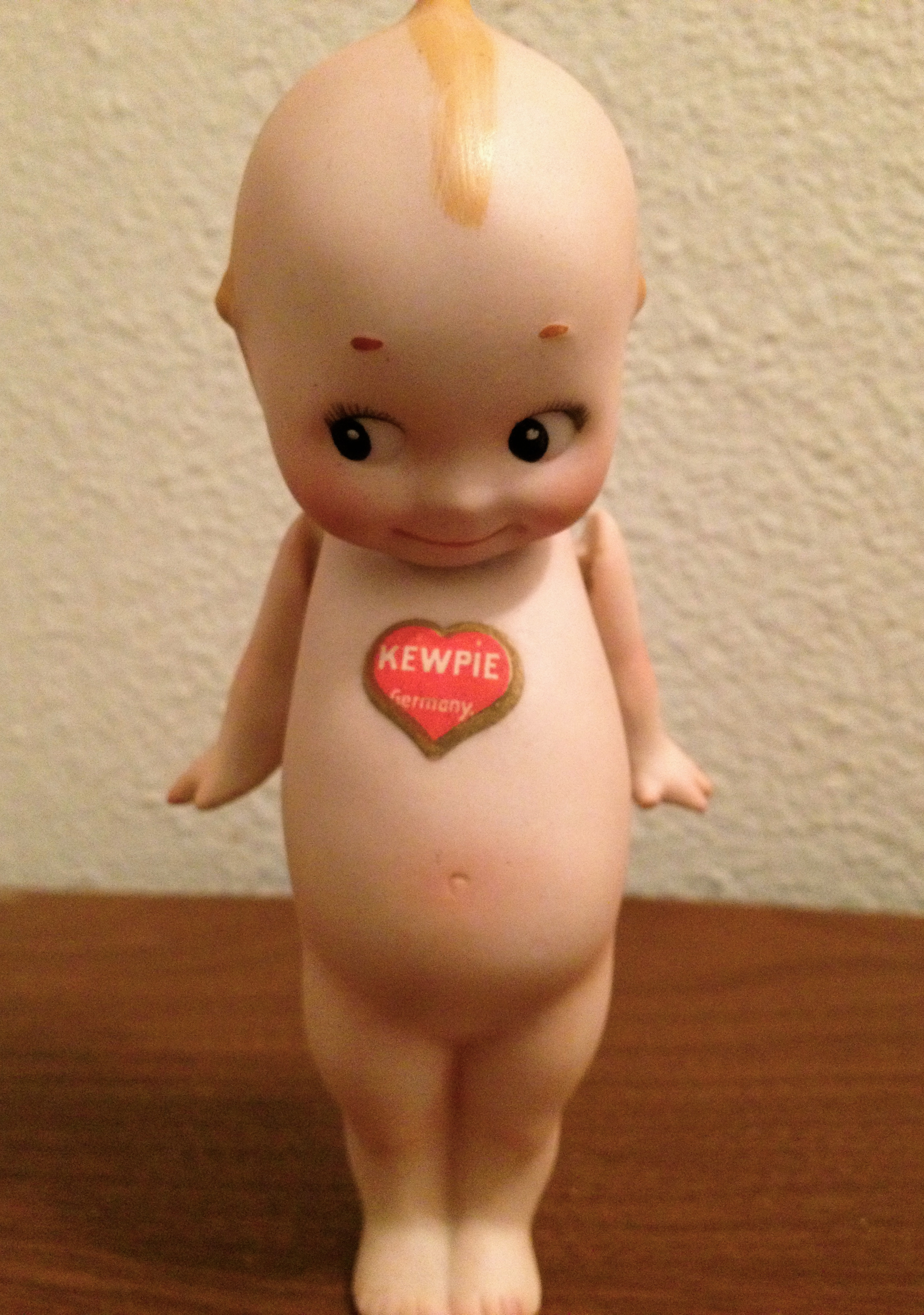
- Original German-made bisque Kewpie, c. 1912
- Type: Doll, figurine
- Invented by: Rose O'Neill
- Company: J. D. Kestner (1912–1920s); Cameo Co. (c. 1930s–1960s); Jesco (c. 1970s–2011); Kewpie Corporation(c. 2012–present)
- Country: United States
- Availability: 1912–present
- Materials: Bisque, composition, celluloid

Kewpie is a brand of dolls and figurines that were conceived as comic strip characters by American cartoonist Rose O'Neill. The illustrated cartoons, appearing as baby Cupid characters, began to gain popularity after the publication of O'Neill's comic strips in 1909, and O'Neill began to illustrate and sell paper doll versions of the Kewpies. The characters were first produced as bisque dolls in Waltershausen, Germany, beginning in 1912, and became extremely popular in the early 20th century.

The Kewpie dolls were initially made out of bisque exclusively, but composition versions were introduced in the 1920s, and celluloid versions were manufactured in the following decades. In 1949, Effanbee created the first hard plastic versions of the dolls, and soft rubber and vinyl versions were produced by Cameo Co. and Jesco between the 1960s and 1990s.

The earlier bisque and composition versions of Kewpie dolls are widely sought after by antique and doll collectors, who especially want those hand-signed by O'Neill. Kewpies should not be confused with the baby-like Billiken figures that debuted in 1908.

== Background and history ==
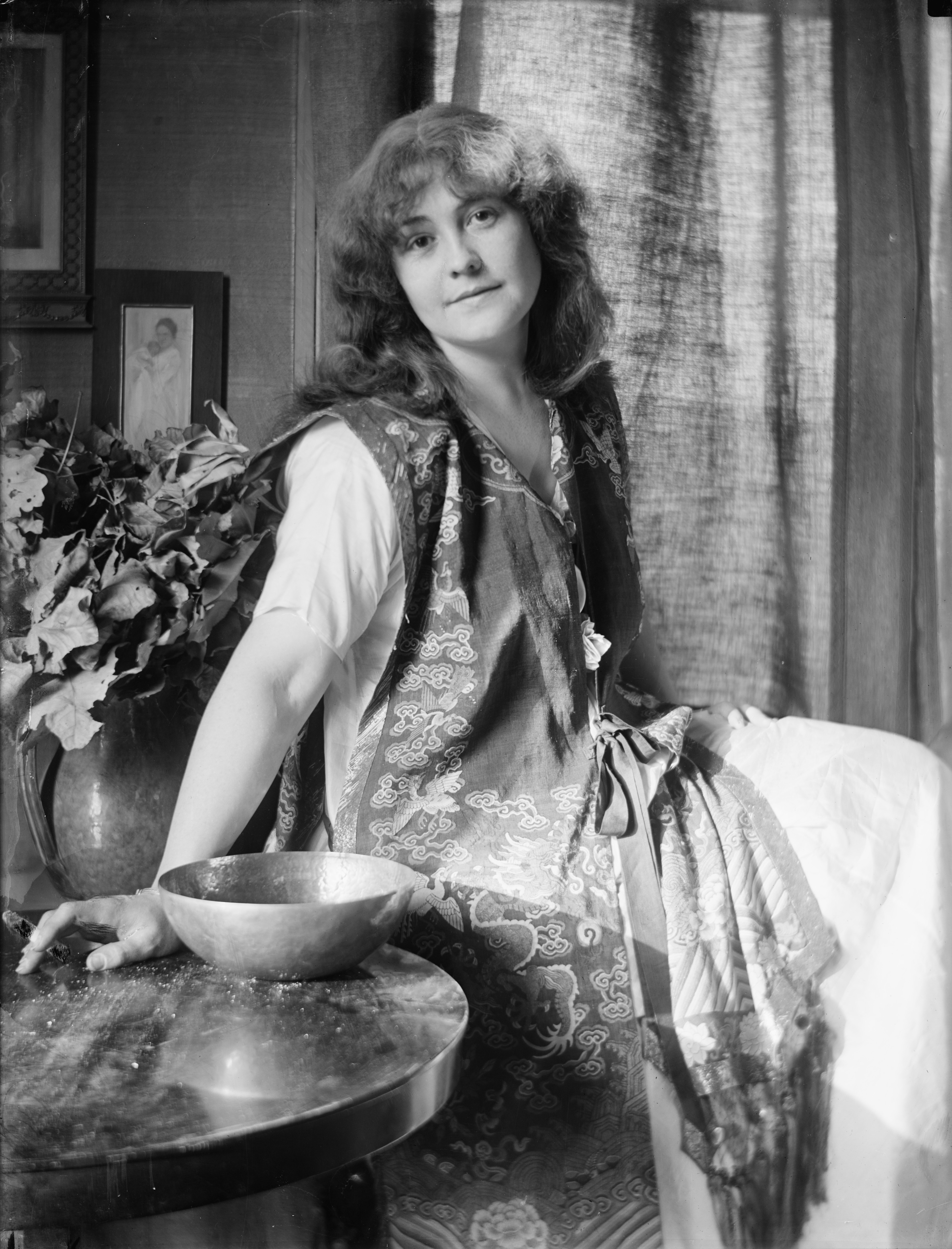
Rose O'Neill, c. 1907

Rose O'Neill, a Nebraska native who had worked as a writer and illustrator in New York City, initially conceptualized the Kewpie as a cartoon intended for a comic strip in 1909. According to O'Neill, the idea for the Kewpies came to her in a dream. The comic, featuring the cherub-faced characters, was first printed in Ladies' Home Journal in the December 1909 issue. O'Neill described the characters as "a sort of little round fairy whose one idea is to teach people to be merry and kind at the same time." The name Kewpie is derived from Cupid, the Roman god of erotic love. After the characters gained popularity among both adults and children, O'Neill began illustrating paper dolls of them, called Kewpie Kutouts.

O'Neill produced a Sunday comic strip for newspapers starting December 2, 1917, syndicated by the McClure Syndicate. The strip ended nine months later, on July 28, 1918. She produced a second Sunday strip starting November 25, 1934, and that version lasted until February 6, 1937.

== Production ==
=== German bisque: 1912–1915 ===
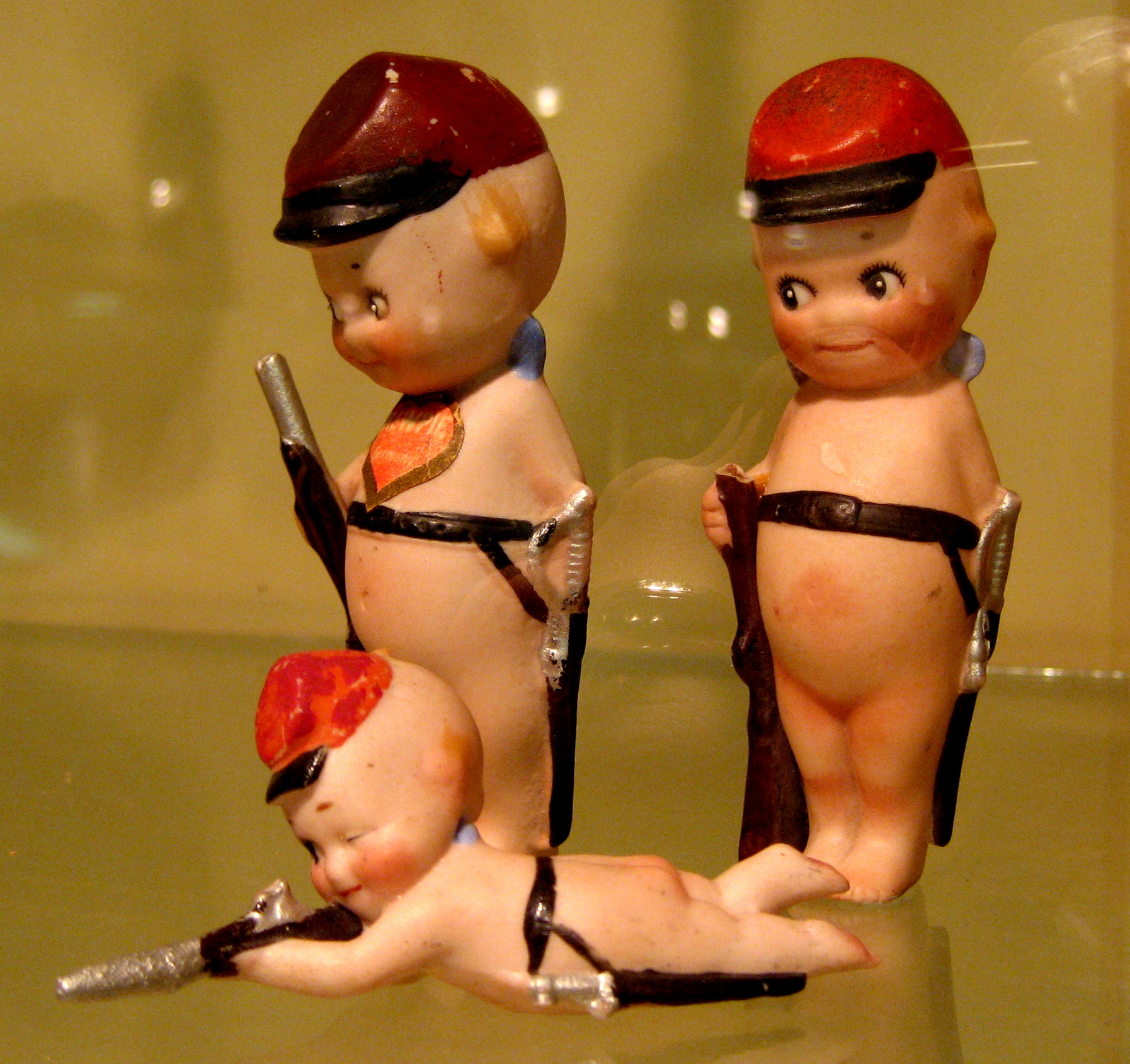
Soldier-themed bisque Kewpies at the Ralph Foster Museum

Kewpies in a Jell-O newspaper ad from 1915

As demand for the Kewpie characters increased, Geo. Borgfeldt & Co. in New York contacted O'Neill in 1912 about developing a line of dolls and figurines. O'Neill agreed, and J.D. Kestner, a German toy company located in Waltershausen, set forth to manufacture small bisque dolls of the Kewpies. After the company manufactured the first run of dolls, they sent samples to O'Neill, who disapproved of the design because she felt they "did not look like her characters."

O'Neill traveled to Germany and had the company destroy the moulds of the dolls, and oversaw the final redesign of them, working with a 17-year-old art student named Joseph Kallus. The dolls were then released in nine different sizes, ranging from 1 to 12 inches (25–305 mm) in height. These early Kewpies wore a heart-shaped decal on their chests, which read "Kewpie, Germany", and some had jointed arms. Many of these original German Kewpies were signed by O'Neill herself, and some were featured in various poses.

The small dolls became an international hit, and by 1914, O'Neill had become the highest-paid female illustrator in the country, garnering a small fortune from the wild popularity of the dolls. The Kewpie brand soon became a household name, and was used widely in product advertising, including promotion for Jell-O, Colgate, Kellogg's Corn Flakes, and Sears. The Kewpies also appeared as a brand on a multitude of household items and other memorabilia, such as dishware, rattles, soap, pepper shakers, coloring books, poetry collections, and stationery.

O'Neill also famously used the characters to promote the women's suffrage movement, using the illustrations in slogans and cartoons.

=== Composition and celluloid: 1916–1930s ===
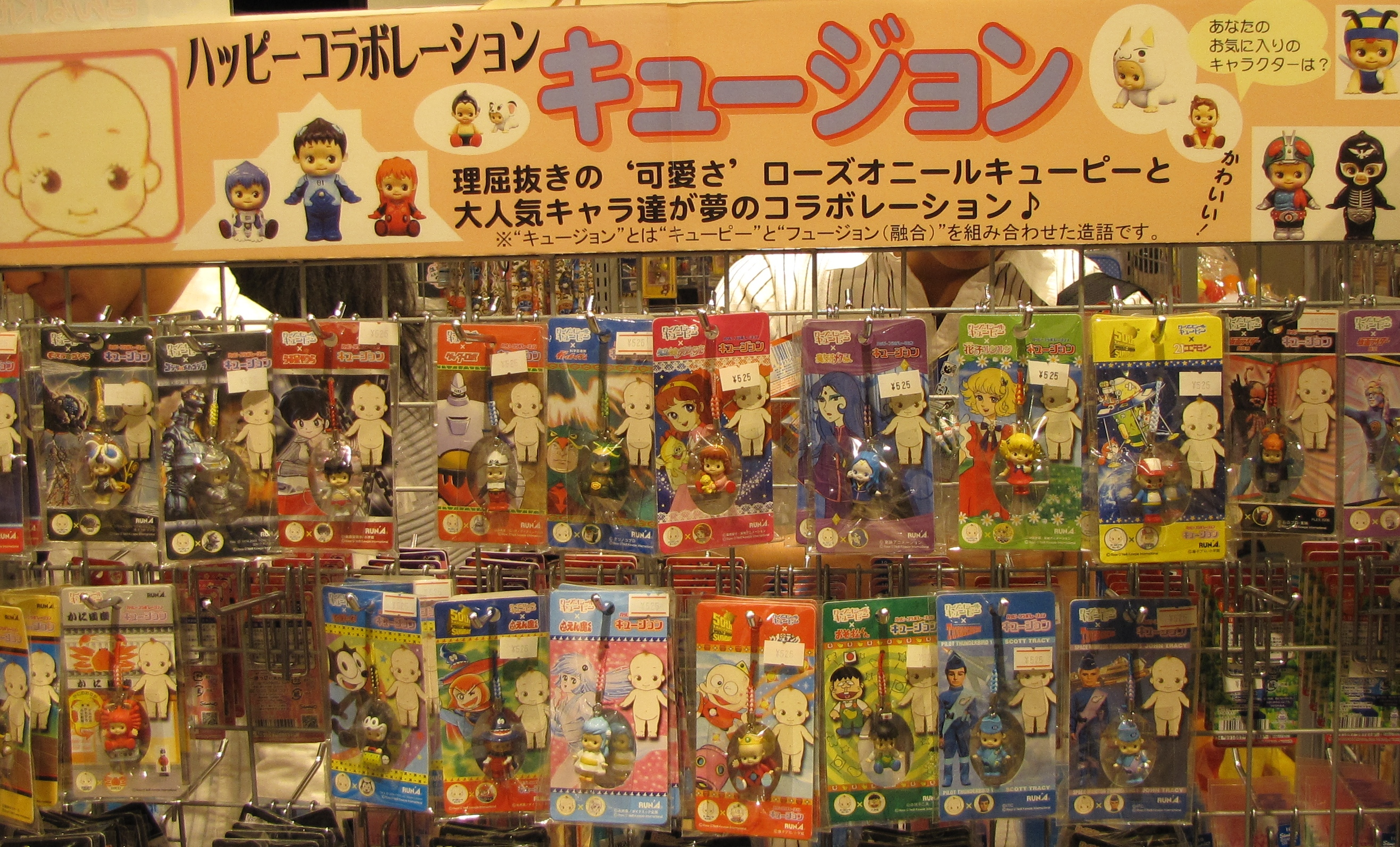
Kewpie Fusion toys in Japan

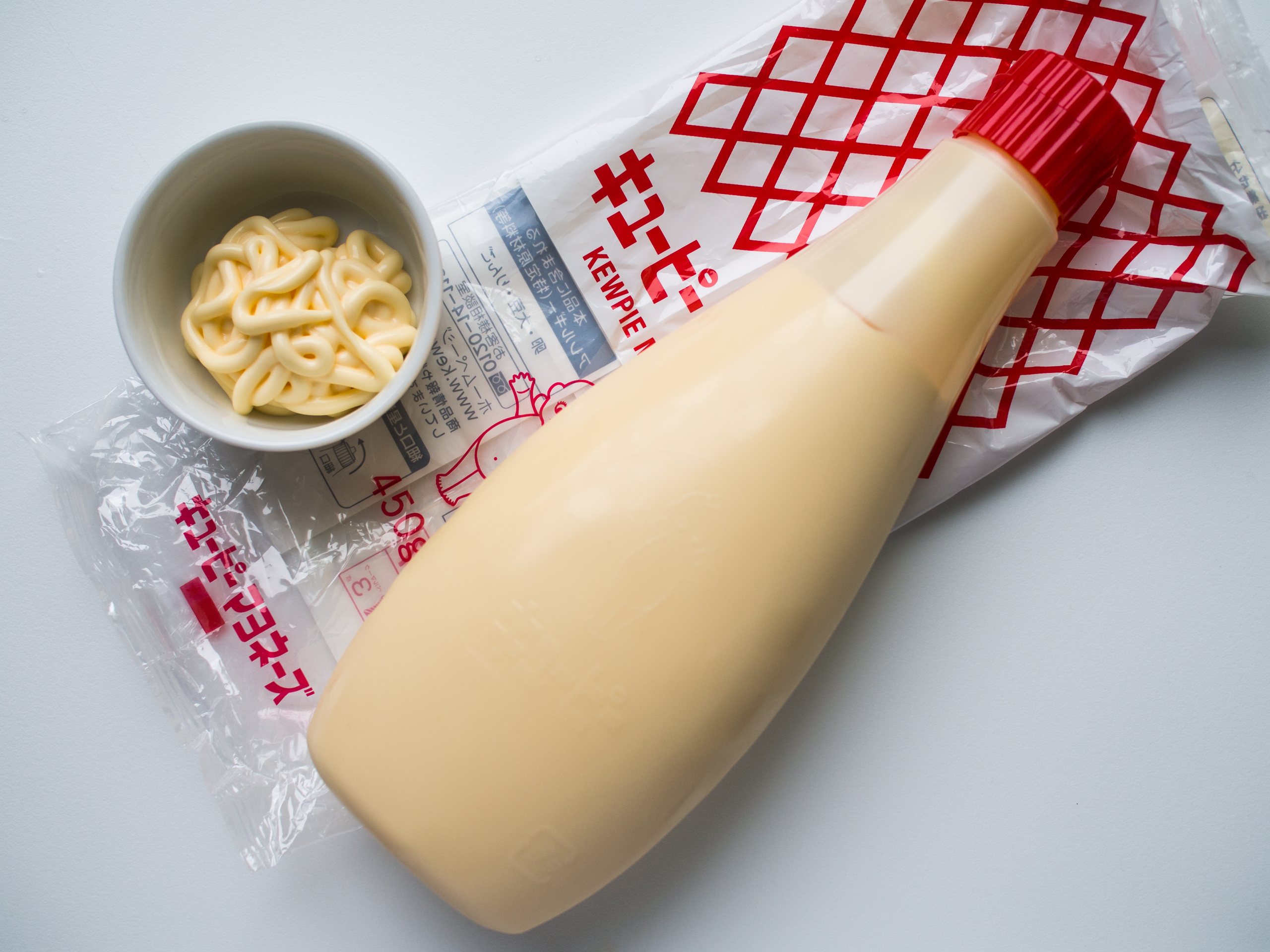
Kewpie mayonnaise from Japan

After World War I began in Europe, production of the bisque Kewpie dolls moved from Germany to France and Belgium, due to rising tensions after the assassination of Archduke Franz Ferdinand. Around this time, the dolls also began to be produced in the United States, made of composition material rather than bisque, due to bisque's fragility. The manufacturers also began to increase the sizes of the dolls, producing 22-inch (560 mm) versions in addition to the 12-inch (300 mm) versions. The American composition dolls also had the distinctive heart-shaped decal on the chest, reading "Kewpies, des. & copyright by Rose O'Neill." Like the original bisque models, some of the composition Kewpies were also hand-signed by O'Neill, and they all included jointed arms.

In the mid-1920s, small-sized celluloid versions of Kewpies appeared, and were often given out as prizes at carnivals. Many of the celluloid versions were mainly manufactured in Japan, unlicensed, and were of a lower quality than other Kewpies. During this time, many Kewpies were sold with clothing, as well.

After noticing a trend of Westernization in Japan following 1923’s Great Kantō Earthquake, Toichiro Nakashima of the Shokuhin Kogyo company began working to manufacture Kewpie Mayonnaise, inspired by his years spent in the United States and United Kingdom as an overseas intern of the then Japan Department of Agriculture and Commerce. The newly established company used the brand name Kewpie due to the popularity of the Kewpie doll in Japan at the time, adopting the doll as the product’s logo. Kewpie went on to become the best-selling mayonnaise in Japan.

=== Later models: 1944–present ===
As photographs became more commonplace in advertising, the prominence of Kewpies in the marketing circuit began to wane. O'Neill returned to Missouri, where she died purportedly impoverished of complications from a series of strokes in 1944. Despite the lessening in popularity, Kewpies continued to be manufactured for the majority of the century, including hard plastic versions, as well as all-bisque replicas of the original Kewpies, produced by Jesco and Cameo Co. in the 1960s until the 1990s. These reproduction Kewpies lack the heart-shaped decal that distinguishes the original, older versions.

== Collectibility ==
According to 200 Years of Dolls (fourth edition), a 10-inch Kewpie with a bisque head, composition body, and glass eyes today is worth $6,500, while a 20-inch (510 mm) doll is valued at $20,000. Many of the original, small-sized German-produced bisque Kewpies (c. 1912-1915) range from $200–$500 among collectors. Composition Kewpies range from $100–$300, while celluloid versions (especially unlicensed Japanese reproductions) are worth considerably less. Kewpies that were hand-signed by Rose O'Neill (most often etched on their arms or feet) are much rarer than unsigned Kewpies.

== Gallery ==
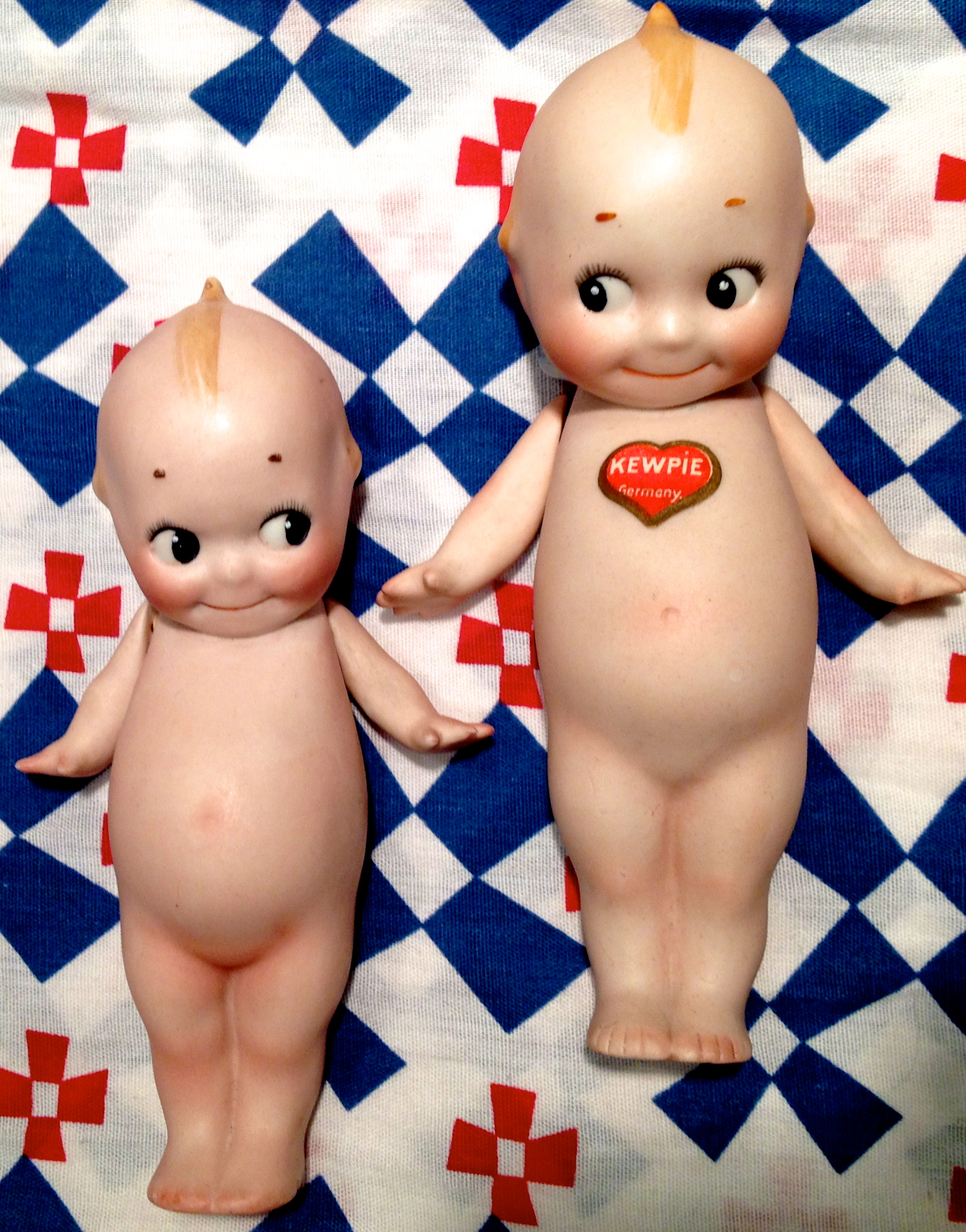
Original German bisque Kewpies

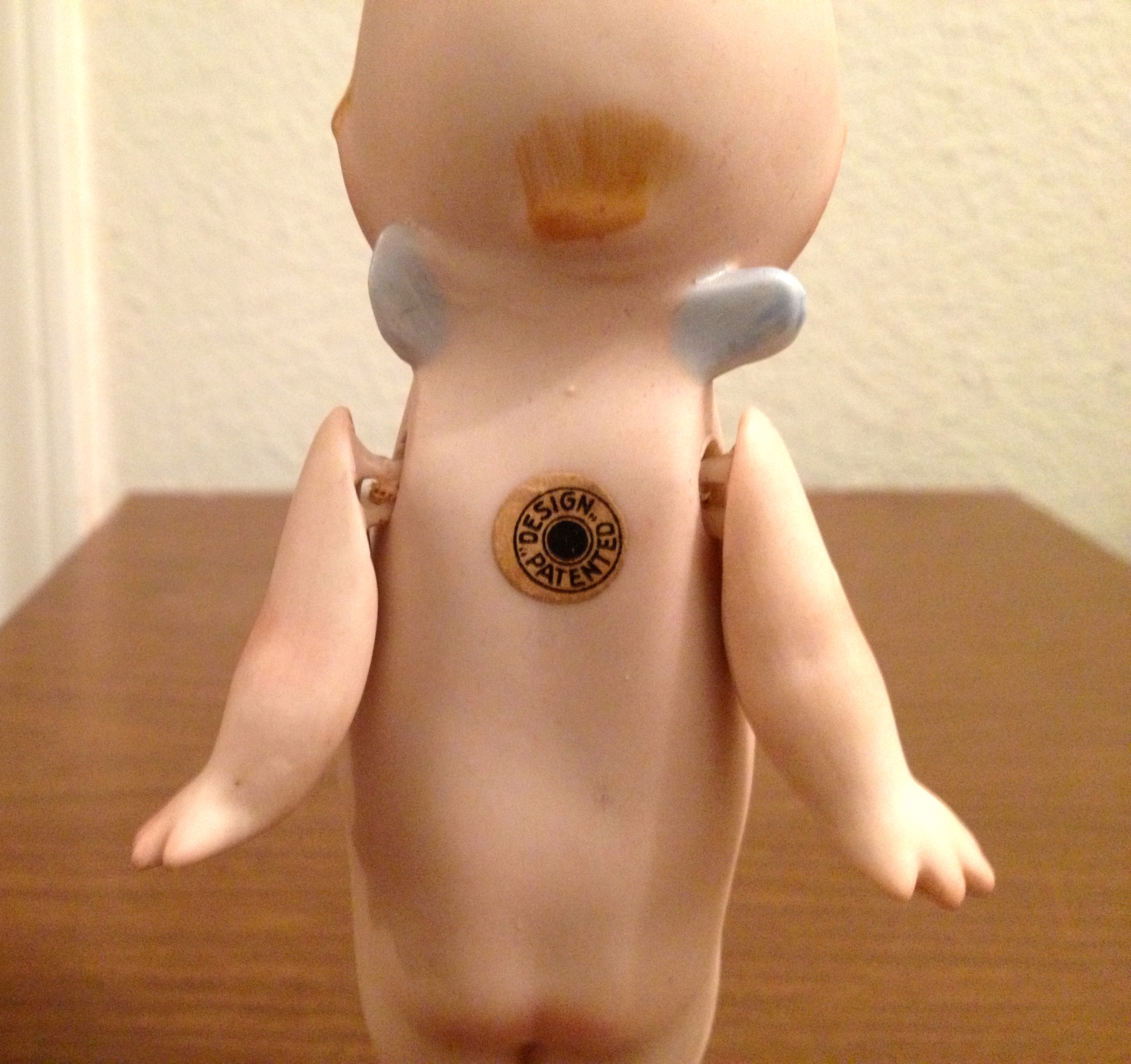
Back of bisque Kewpie, c. 1912: All official Kewpies have signature blue wings on the back of their necks.

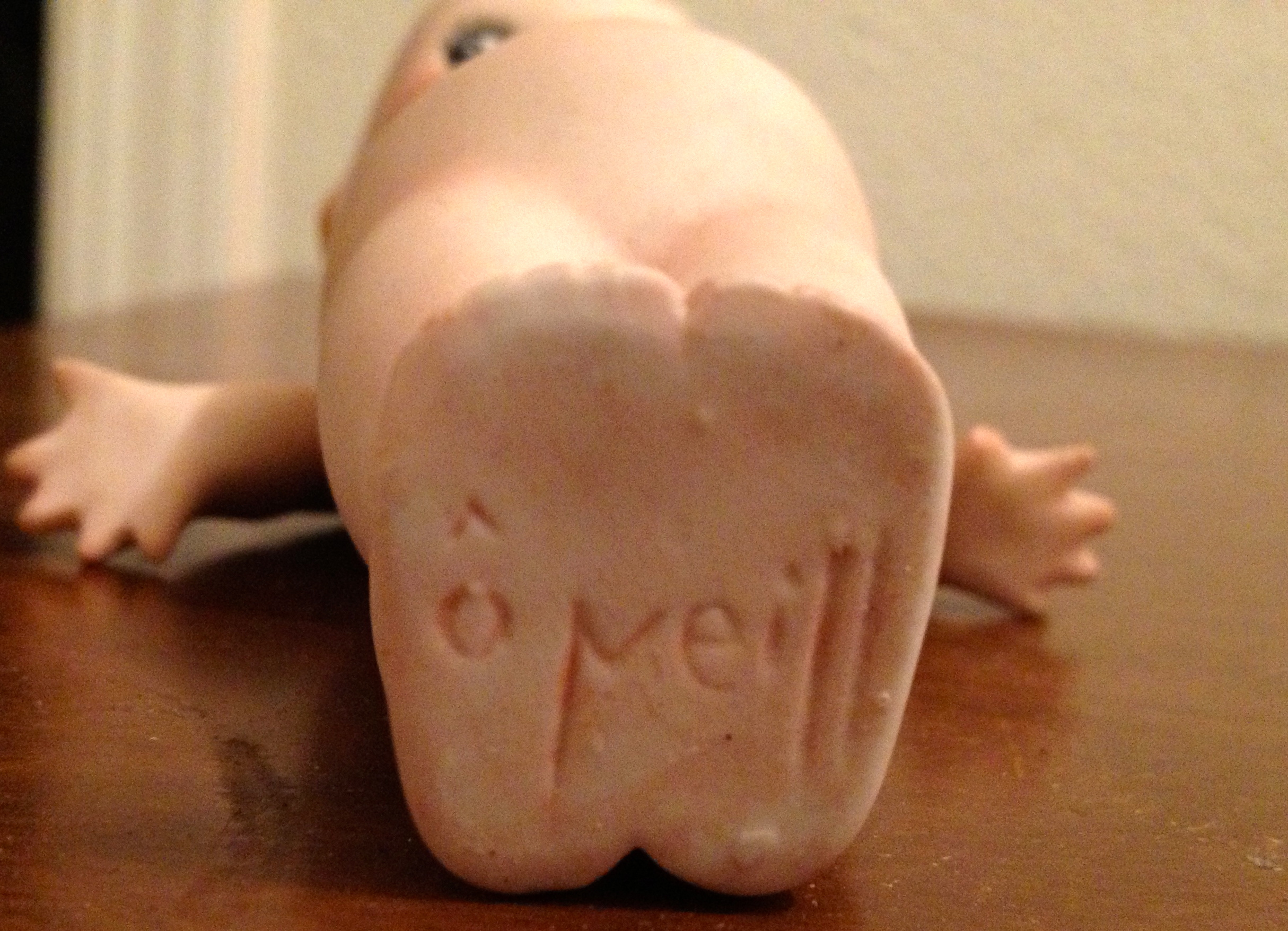
Signature of Rose O'Neill on bottom of a c. 1912 bisque Kewpie

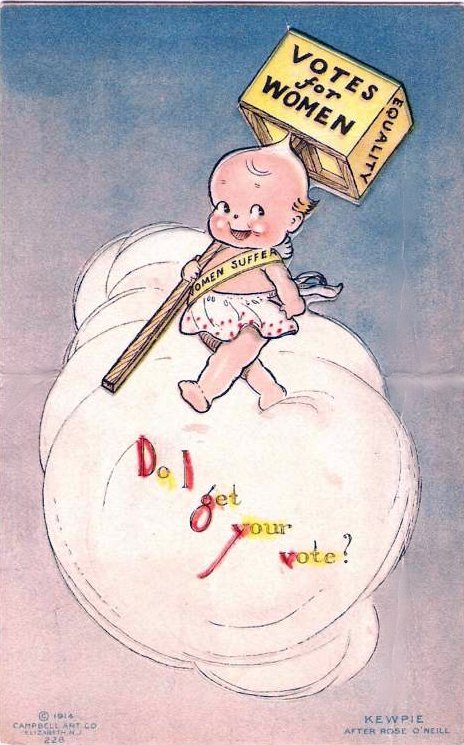
Postcard promoting women's suffrage movement, illustrated by O'Neill, 1914

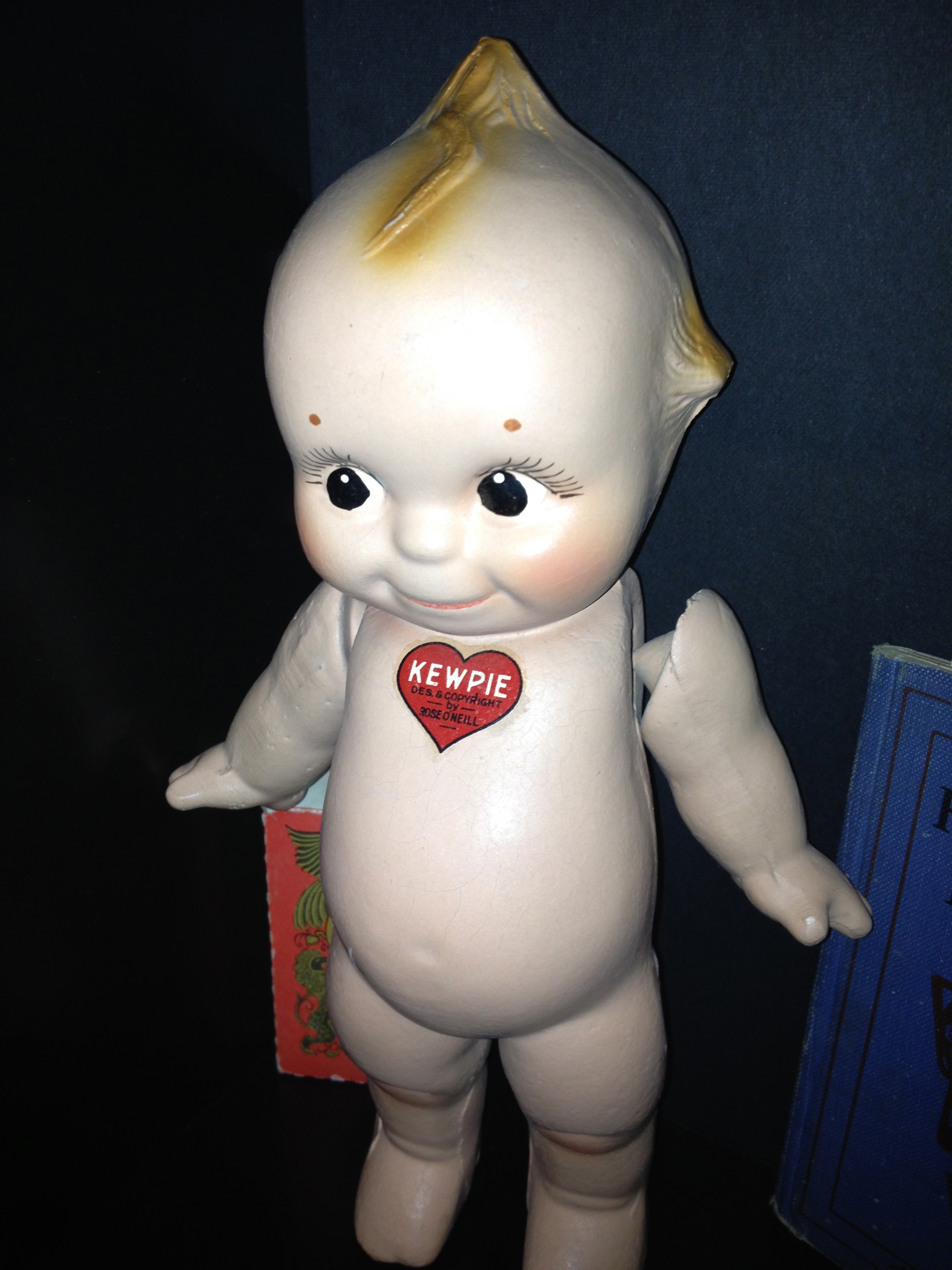
Composition Kewpie, c. 1920

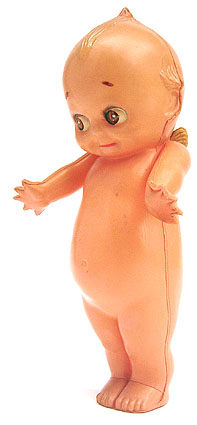
Celluloid Kewpie, c. 1930s: These were often given out as prizes at carnivals.

== See also ==
- Kewpie doll effect
- Chocolate Kewpies
- Kewpie (mayonnaise)
