= Bull Creek (Lake Taneycomo) =

Stream in the U.S. state of Missouri

Bull Creek is a stream in Christian and Taney counties in the Ozarks of southern Missouri.

Bull Creek's headwaters are on the south edge of the Springfield Plateau just south of Sparta at an elevation of 1,370 ft (420 m). The stream flows south and southwest through portions of the Mark Twain National Forest. As it enters Taney County the stream gradient lessens and it occupies a series of entrenched meanders. As it passes Walnut Shade the stream is bridged by US 160 and receives the flow of Bear Creek. It enters the White River and Lake Taneycomo just southwest of Rockaway Beach. The confluence elevation is 699 ft (213 m). At Walnut Shade, the creek has an average discharge of 224 cubic feet per second.

Source coordinates: 36°59′18″N 93°04′51″W; confluence coordinates: 36°41′46″N 93°09′59″W.

According to tradition, Bull Creek was named for the fact the area was the hunting ground of buffalo bulls by pioneer citizens.

== See also ==
- List of rivers of Missouri
