= Square Maréchal Montgomery =

Square in Brussels, Belgium

Square Montgomery (French); Montgomeryplein (Dutch)
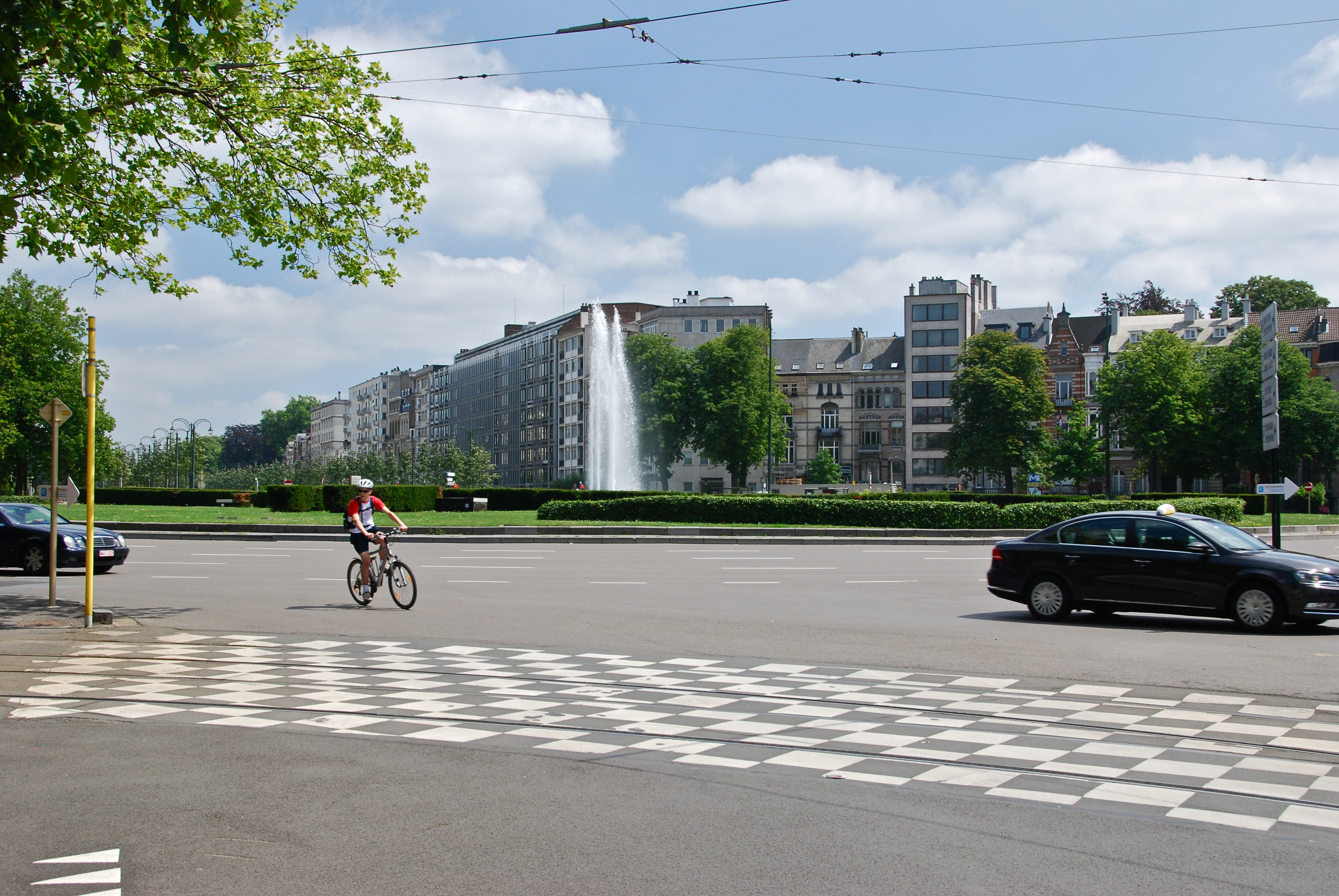
- View of the Square Montgomery roundabout

- Location within Brussels Location within Belgium
- Namesake: Bernard Montgomery
- Type: Square
- Location: Woluwe-Saint-Pierre, Brussels-Capital Region, Belgium
- Postal code: 1150
- Nearest metro station: 1 Montgomery
- Coordinates: 50°50′15″N 04°24′27″E

Construction
- Completion: c. 1870

The Square Maréchal Montgomery (French, pronounced [skwaʁ ma.ʁe.ʃal mɔ̃.ɡɔm.ʁi]) or Maarschalk Montgomeryplein (Dutch, pronounced [ˈmaːrsxɑlk ˈmɔntɡɔmərɪˌplɛin]), usually shortened to the Square Montgomery, or Montgomery by locals, is a major intersection in the Woluwe-Saint-Pierre municipality of Brussels, Belgium. It is named in honour of Field Marshal Bernard Montgomery, a senior British Army officer who served in the First World War, the Irish War of Independence and the Second World War. It is situated on the intersection of the Avenue de Tervueren/Tervurenlaan, the Boulevard Brand Whitlock/Brand Whitlocklaan and the Boulevard Saint-Michel/Sint-Michielslaan.

Below the square, Montgomery metro station serves as the first station on the eastern branch of line 1 of the Brussels Metro. The station is also a stop for trams 7, 25, 39 and 44, while tram 81 and various Brussels Intercommunal Transport Company (STIB/MIVB) bus services stop at surface level.

== Description ==
At surface level, the traffic intersection takes the form of a multi-lane roundabout. Traffic not turning is routed through two tunnels; the Tervuren Tunnel takes vehicles travelling on the Avenue de Tervueren/Tervurenlaan under the junction, while traffic on the Greater Ring (from the Boulevard Brand Whitlock/Brand Whitlocklaan and the Boulevard Saint-Michel/Sint-Michielslaan) is routed away from the intersection via the Montgomery Tunnel.

The centre of the roundabout is occupied by a large fountain, while a statue of Montgomery stands on the Avenue de Tervueren facing it.

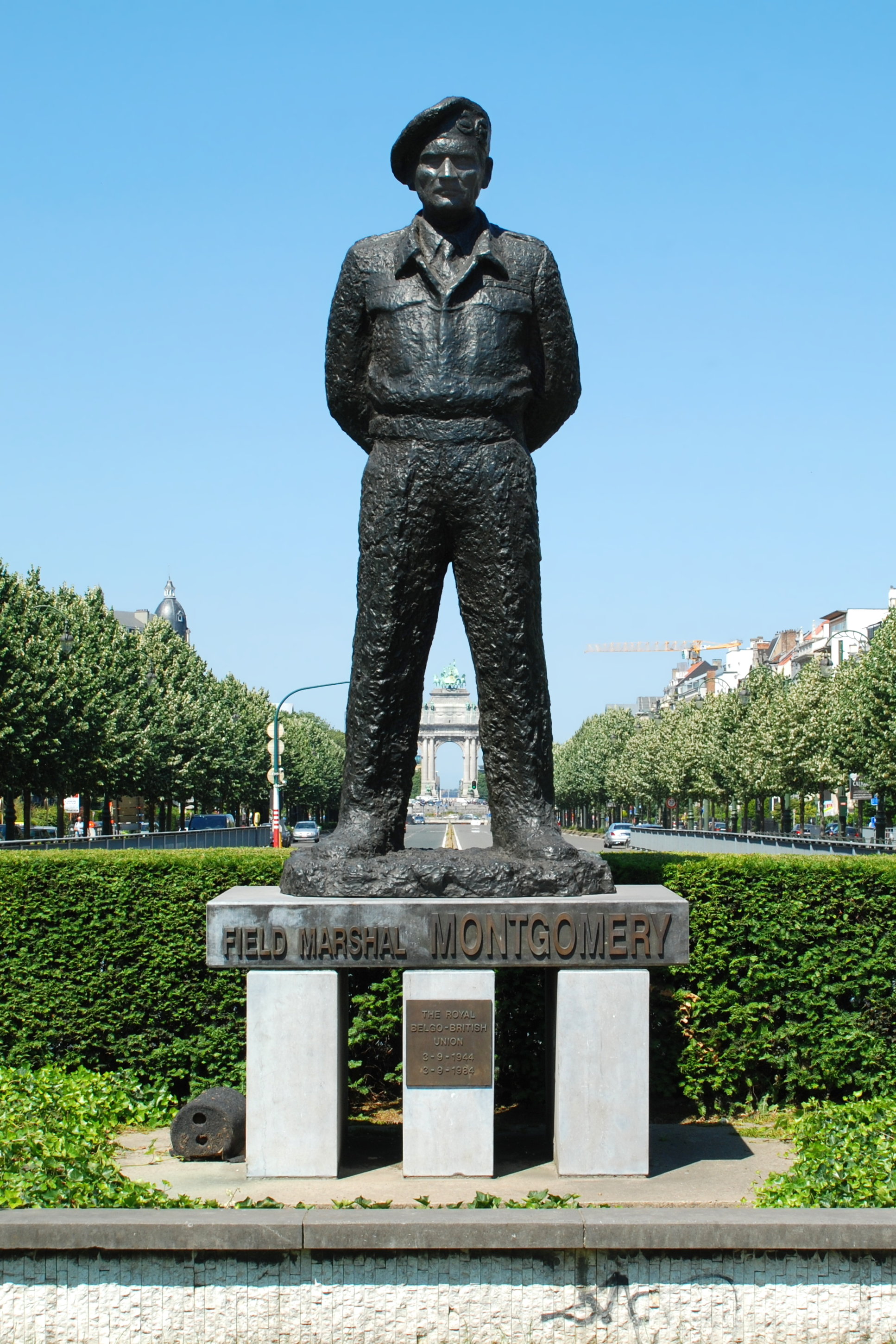
Statue of Bernard Montgomery

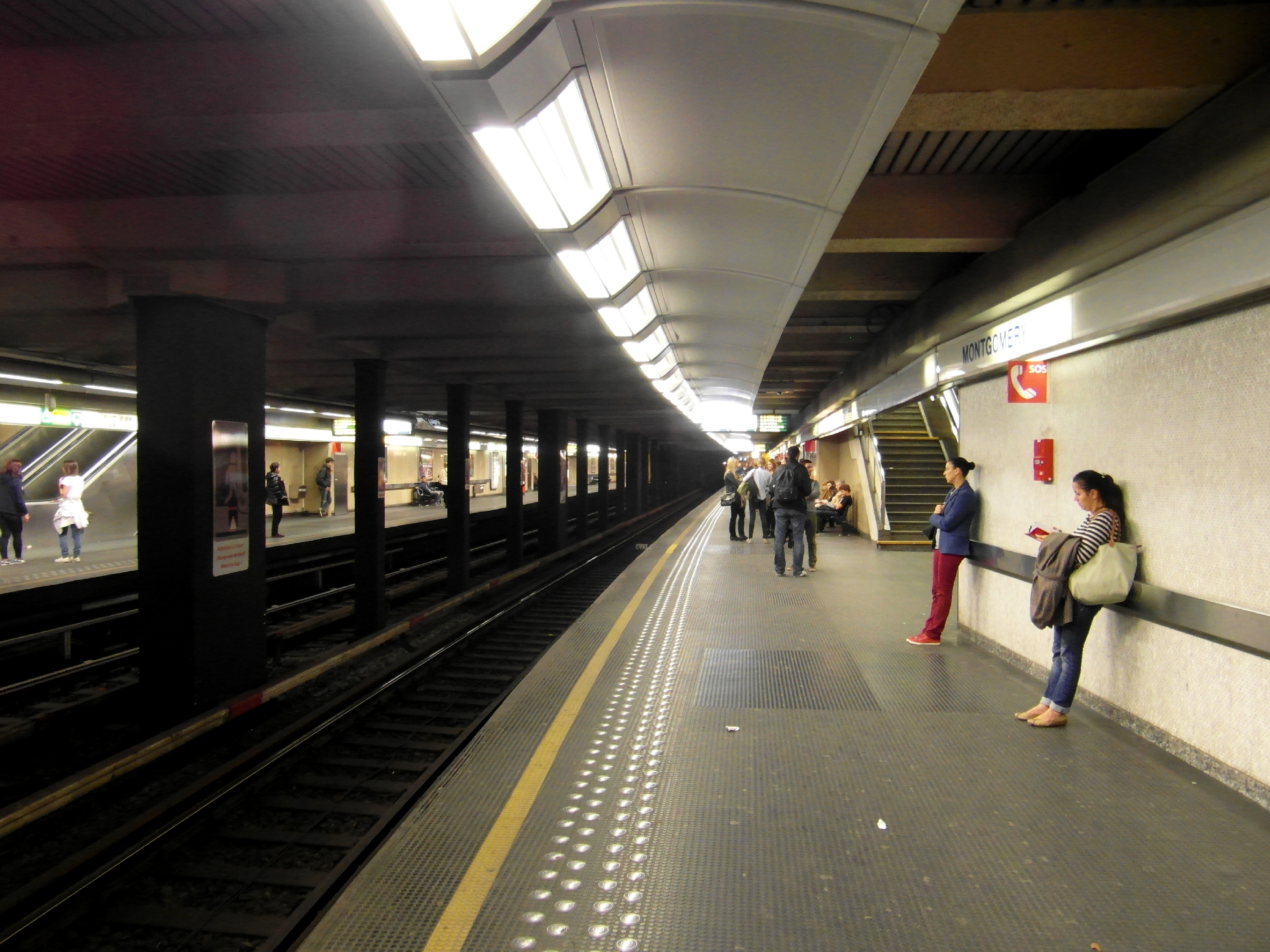
Montgomery metro station

== See also ==
- History of Brussels
- Belgium in the long nineteenth century
