= Brussels tram route 39 =

Tram route in Brussels, Belgium

STIB/MIVB Route 39
- Ban Eik – Montgomery
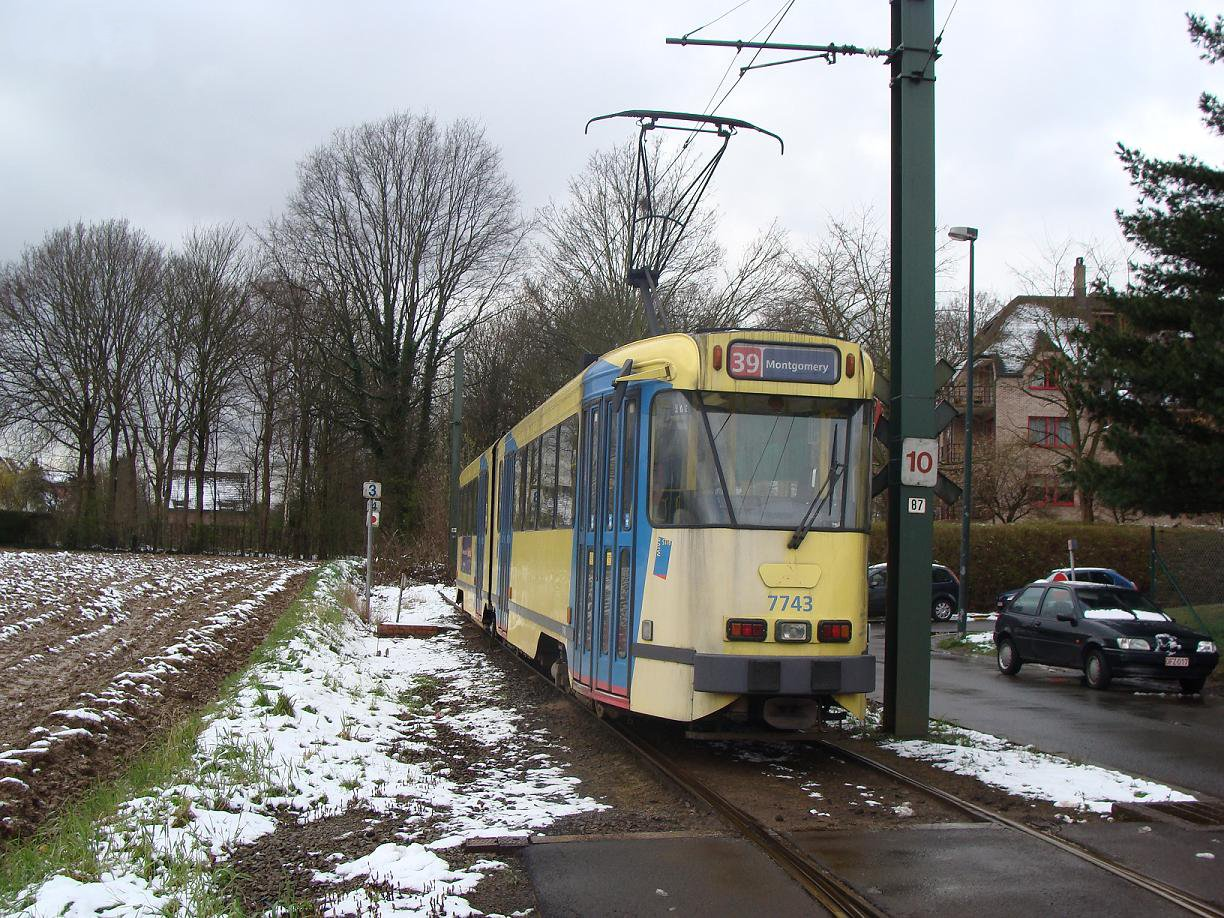
- PCC 7743 at Ban Eik

Overview
- System: Brussels tramway network
- Operator: STIB/MIVB
- Depot: Ixelles, Woluwe-Saint-Pierre
- Vehicle: PCC 7700/7800
- Status: Operational
- Began service: 16 April 1968

Route
- Locale: Brussels, Belgium
- Communities served: Wezembeek-Oppem; Kraainem; Woluwe-Saint-Pierre
- Start: Ban Eik
- End: Montgomery
- Length: 8.90 km (5.53 mi)

Service
- Journey time: 20 minutes
Route map


The tram route 39 in Brussels, Belgium, is operated by STIB/MIVB, and connects Montgomery metro station in the municipality of Woluwe-Saint-Pierre to the Ban Eik stop in the Flemish municipality of Wezembeek-Oppem.

== History ==
The tram route 39 began in 1925, and ran from the city centre to the Place Dumon/Dumonplein in the Stockel/Stokkel neighbourhood of Woluwe-Saint-Pierre, in eastern Brussels. The square had recently been purchased by the municipality and served as the turning circle for the tram.

== Route ==
Starting from the underground terminus at Montgomery metro station, the route exits the tunnel to run on the north side of the Avenue de Tervueren/Tervurenlaan, mostly in reserved track, along with tram route 44. It then runs alongside Woluwe Park, Parmentier Park and the Mellaerts Ponds, passing the Brussels Urban Transport Museum. At the junction with the Avenue Alfred Madoux/Alfred Madouxlaan, the route exits the Avenue de Tervueren and heads toward Stockel/Stokkel metro station via the Avenue Orban/Orbanlaan. Past Stockel, the route runs on the Avenue de Hinnisdael/De Hinnisdaellaan and then turns right, where it enters the Flemish Region and the municipalities of Kraainem and Wezembeek-Oppem respectively. At some point, the route runs on a bridge over the Brussels Ring.

Route
Stops	Correspondances
Montgomery	
GJ Martin	
Léopold II/Leopold II
Jules César/Julius Caesar	
Chien Vert/Groene Hond
Musée du Tram/Trammuseum	
de Villalobar	
Madoux
Rue au Bois/Bosstraat	
Aviation/Luchtvaart
Escrime/Schermkunst
Stockel/Stokkel	
Amitié/Vriendschap
Églantiers/Wilderozen
de Burbure
Bel-Air/Schone Lucht
Louis Marcelis	
Beek/Ruisseau
Ter Meeren
Ban-Eik

== See also ==
- List of Brussels tram routes
