= Van Huffel =

Van Huffel is the surname of:

- Albert Van Huffel, Belgian architect of Basilica of the Sacred Heart, Brussels
- Chris Van Huffel, American drummer for psychedelic rock band SubArachnoid Space
- Danny van Huffel, Dutch footballer for AFC Ajax (amateurs)
- Mary-Anne Plaatjies van Huffel, South African pastor and academic
- Nick Van Huffel, Belgian footballer for Hoogstraten VV
- Peter van Huffel, Canadian jazz saxophonist, clarinetist and composer
- Sabine Van Huffel, Belgian applied mathematician
- Valentin van Huffel, French archer, bronze medalist at the 2007 World Indoor Archery Championships
- Wim Van Huffel, Belgian bicycle racer

== See also ==
- Van Huffel, fictional police officer in action film Until Death
