= Sophie Tassignon =

Belgian singer & musician (born 1980)

- Born: 29 March 1980 (age 46); Brussels, Belgium
- Genres: Jazz
- Occupations: Singer, composer
- Instrument: Piano
- Years active: 2002–present
- Spouse: Peter van Huffel (divorced)
- Website: www.sophietassignon.com

Sophie Tassignon (born March 29, 1980 in Brussels, Belgium) is a Belgian jazz singer, improvisational musician (vocals) and composer based in Berlin since 2008.

== Biography ==
Tassignon, who spent part of her childhood in Germany, received her first classical piano lessons at the age of four. At the age of seven, she won first prize at the Jugend musiziert children and adolescents music competition in Hanover. As a child, she sang in a choir. As a teenager, she also studied drums for five years and trumpet for two years, but returned to piano and vocals. She also wrote songs and experimented with several recordings. She continued her studies in Brussels and attended the German School of Brussels. She then attended the Royal Conservatory of Brussels, where she obtained a master's degree. She also studied jazz piano and took classical singing lessons.

In 2005, Tassignon founded the a cappella project Screaming Bitches with singers Anu Junnonen, Elena Dunkelman and Jacobien Vlasman, who toured European jazz clubs. With her first Jazz Quartet, she released Zoshia: Moon Talk in 2006. In 2008, she published the album Hufflignon with her then-husband, Canadian jazz musician and saxophonist, Peter van Huffel, bassist Michael Bates and trombonist Samuel Blaser. With the British electronic musician Simon Vincent, she formed the electro-acoustic duo Charlotte & Mr. Stone, performing sonic textures and compositions in a live context. The duo first released the album Trees & Birds & Beautiful Things in 2011 on the Vision of Sound label followed by Live at Café le Burgaud in 2014.

In addition, Tassignon has worked for eight productions by Polish theater director Elzbieta Bednarska. In 2013, with the songwriter, singer and saxophonist Susanne Folk, she founded the group Folk-Tassignon Quartet (from 2015 Azolia), which toured Europe and China and released its first album Dancing on the Rim (Ajazz/NRW Records) in 2014 with bass clarinetist Lothar Ohlmeier and double bassist Andreas Waelti. The group made appearances at the Viersen Jazz Festival and other festivals. Her solo album Mysteries Unfold (RareNoise/Cargo) was released in 2020. Her album KHYAL features eight compositions, all sung in Arabic. She was awarded two gold medals from the Global Music Awards in the categories of Female Singer and Composition.

== Discography ==
- 2006: Zoshia: Moon Talk (Alone Blue)
- 2008: Hufflignon with Peter van Huffel (Clean Feed Records)
- 2011: Charlotte & Mr. Stone: Trees & Birds & Beautiful Things with Simon Vincent (Vision of Sound)
- 2011: Azolia: Dancing On The Rim with Simon Vincent (Vision of Sound)
- 2013: House of Mirrors: Act One (WismART)
- 2011: Charlotte & Mr. Stone: Live At Café Le Burgaud with Simon Vincent (Vision of Sound)
- 2017: Azolia: Everybody Knows (Ajazz)
- 2017: Sophie Tassignon: Licht-Raum-Erkundungen
- 2020: Sophie Tassignon: Mysteries Unfold (RareNoise/Cargo)
- 2021: Azolia: Not About Heroes (Jazzwerkstatt Berlin)
- 2023: Sophie Tassignon: Khyal (W.E.R.F. Records)
- 2025: Sophie Tassignon: A Slender Thread (NEMU Records)
