= Brussels tram route 44 =

Tram route in Brussels, Belgium

STIB/MIVB Route 44
- Montgomery – Tervuren Station
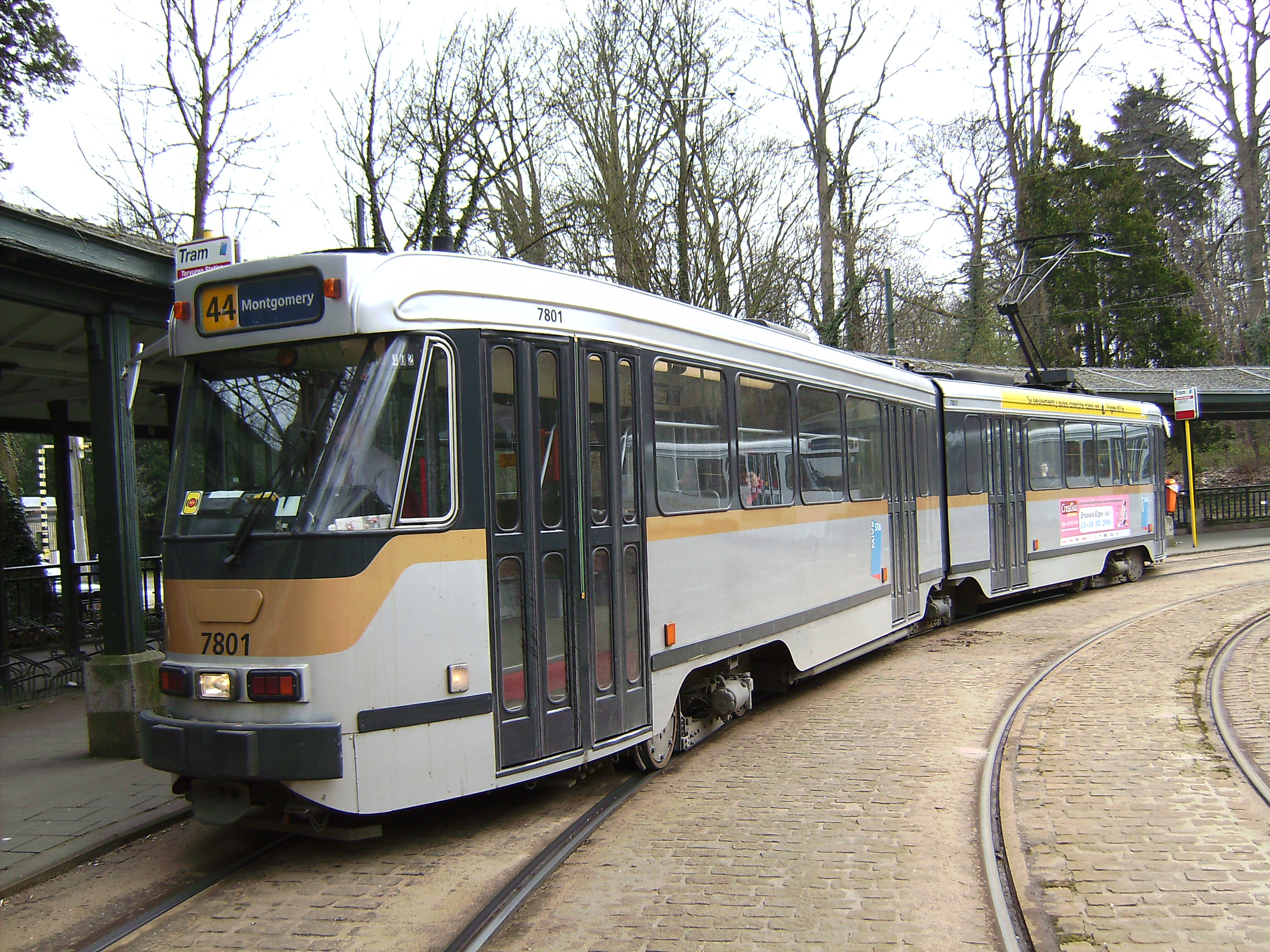
- PCC 7801 at Tervuren Station

Overview
- System: Brussels tramway network
- Operator: STIB/MIVB
- Depot: Ixelles, Woluwe-Saint-Pierre
- Vehicle: PCC 7700/7800
- Status: Operational
- Began service: 19 April 1968

Route
- Locale: Brussels, Belgium
- Communities served: Wezembeek-Oppem; Woluwe-Saint-Pierre; Kraainem; Tervuren
- Start: Montgomery
- End: Tervuren Station
- Length: 9.34 km (5.80 mi)

Service
- Journey time: 20 minutes
Route map


The tram route 44 in Brussels, Belgium, is operated by STIB/MIVB, and connects Montgomery metro station in the municipality of Woluwe-Saint-Pierre to the Flemish municipality of Tervuren, almost exclusively by running on the Avenue de Tervueren/Tervurenlaan.

== History ==
The current tram route 44 was first inaugurated in 1897, at the time of the Brussels International Exposition. It allowed visitors to travel by tram along the newly constructed Avenue de Tervueren/Tervurenlaan, between the Parc du Cinquantenaire/Jubelpark and what is now known as the Royal Museum for Central Africa in Tervuren. This route was previously designated tram route 40 until it was renumbered in 1968.

== Route ==
Starting from the underground terminus at Montgomery metro station, the route exits the tunnel to run on the north side of the Avenue de Tervueren/Tervurenlaan, mostly in reserved track, along with tram route 39. It then runs alongside Woluwe Park, Parmentier Park and the Mellaerts Ponds, passing the Brussels Urban Transport Museum. At the junction with the Avenue Alfred Madoux/Alfred Madouxlaan, route 39 turns off to the left. After a stretch through the northern edge of the Sonian Forest, the route crosses the Brussels Ring, entering the Flemish Region and the municipality of Tervuren at Quatre Bras/Vier Armen. It continues along the Avenue de Tervuren up to its terminus loop at Tervuren Station.

== See also ==
- List of Brussels tram routes
