= Montgomery metro station =

Metro station in Brussels, Belgium

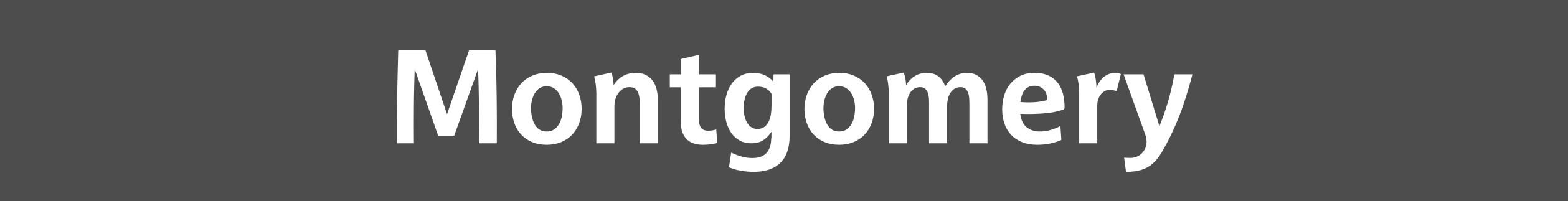

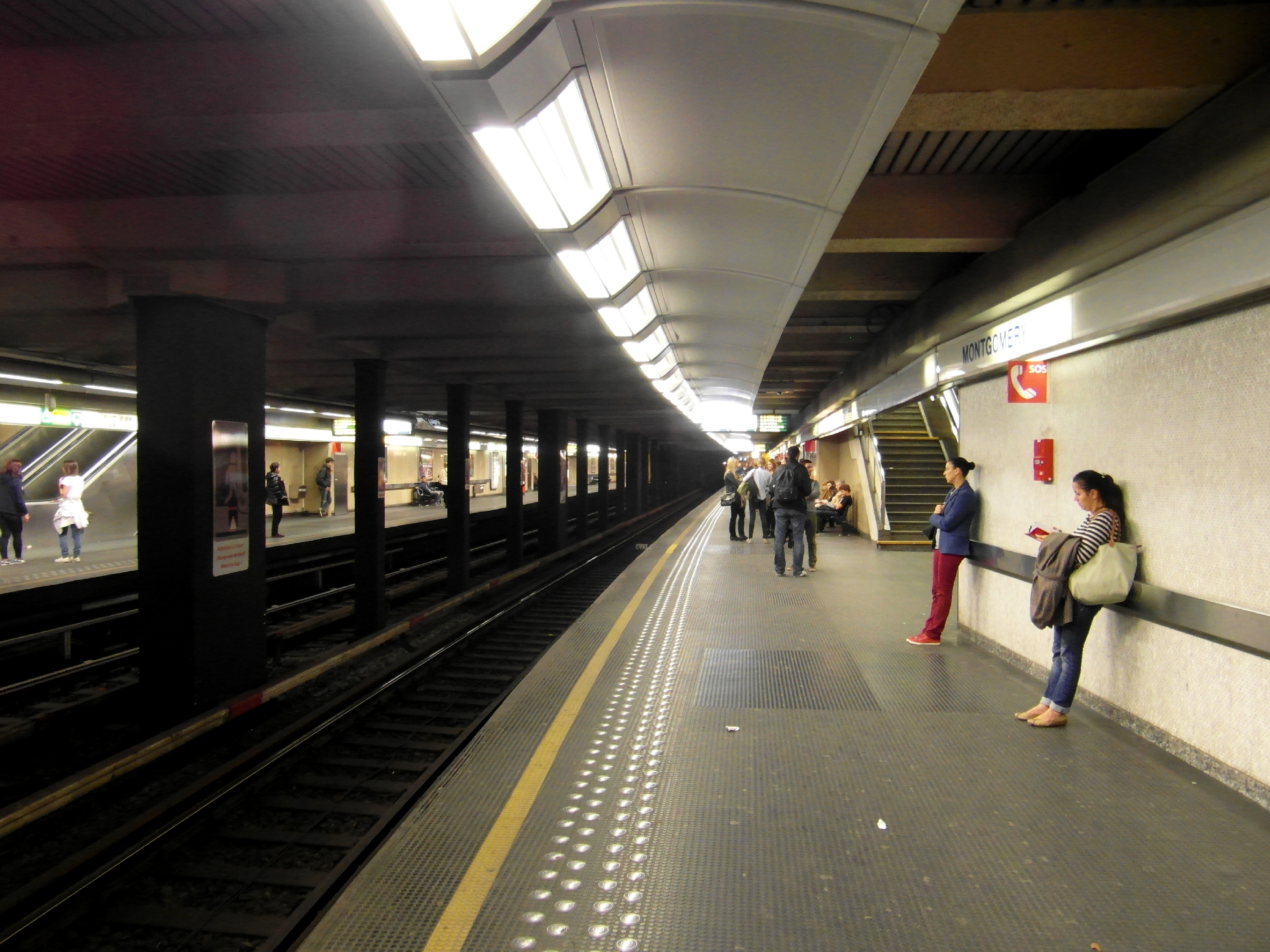
- Montgomery metro station

General information
- Location: Square Maréchal Montgomery / Maarschalk Montgomeryplein, 1150 Woluwe-Saint-Pierre, Brussels-Capital Region, Belgium
- Coordinates: 50°50′16″N 4°24′25″E
- Owner: STIB/MIVB
- Platforms: 2 (metro); 2 (premetro)
- Tracks: 2 (metro); 2 (premetro)

Construction
- Structure type: Underground

History
- Opened: 30 January 1975; 51 years ago (premetro); 20 September 1976; 49 years ago (metro)

Services
Preceding station	Brussels Metro	Following station
Merode towards Gare de l'Ouest/Weststation	Line 1	Joséphine-Charlotte towards Stockel/Stokkel
Location

Montgomery is an underground station on the Brussels Metro, the first station on the eastern branch of line 1 (formerly line 1B), in the Brussels-Capital Region, Belgium. The station also serves a number of tram lines and buses: Brussels tram routes 7 and 25 pass through, and 39 and 44 terminate there, while tram route 81 and a number of buses stop at surface level.

== History ==
The metro station opened on 30 January 1975 and is named after the roundabout above (Square Maréchal Montgomery/Maarschalk Montgomeryplein), which in turn was named after Field Marshal Bernard Montgomery. It is located in the municipality of Woluwe-Saint-Pierre (Sint-Pieters-Woluwe).

== Description ==
The trams' entrance is from the Rue du Duc/Hertogstraat; they exit to the Avenue de Tervueren/Tervurenlaan. The walls of the station are decorated with a large fresco by Jean-Michel Folon titled Magic City.

== See also ==
- Transport in Brussels
- History of Brussels
