= Brussels Urban Transport Museum =

Museum of trams in Brussels, Belgium

- Musée du transport urbain bruxellois (French); Museum voor het Stedelijk Vervoer te Brussel (Dutch)

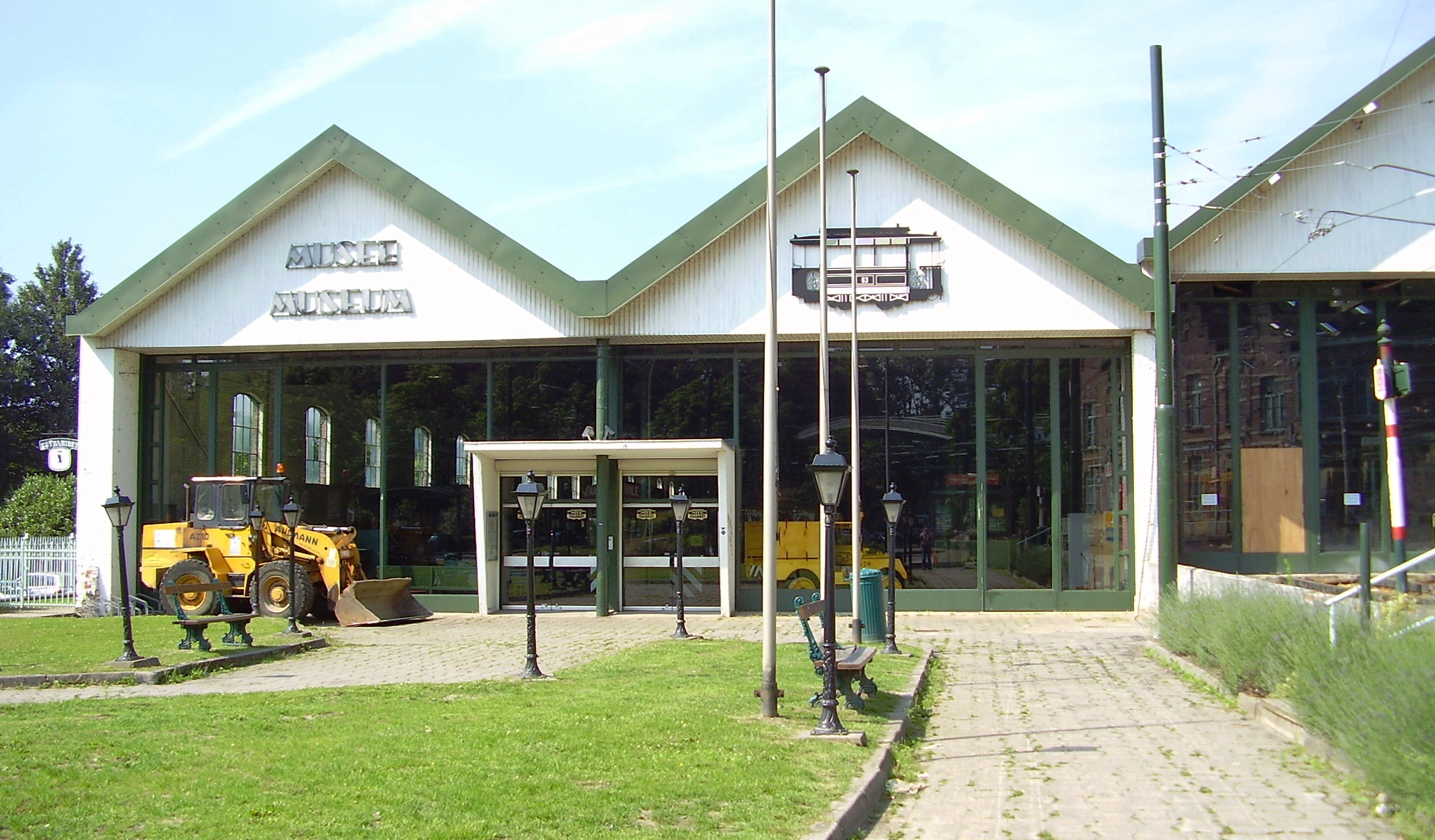
- Entrance of the museum
- Interactive fullscreen map
- Established: 18 March 1982; 44 years ago
- Location: Avenue de Tervueren / Tervurenlaan 364b, 1150 Woluwe-Saint-Pierre, Brussels-Capital Region, Belgium
- Coordinates: 50°49′54″N 4°26′2″E
- Founder: STIB/MIVB
- Website: trammuseum.brussels/en

The Brussels Urban Transport Museum (French: Musée du transport urbain bruxellois (MTUB); Dutch: Museum voor het Stedelijk Vervoer te Brussel (MSVB)), also known as the Tram Museum (French: Musée du Tram; Dutch: Trammuseum), is a transport museum in Woluwe-Saint-Pierre, a municipality of Brussels, Belgium.

Located in an old tram depot, the museum displays a collection of trams and buses from different eras in the history of public transport in Brussels. It is situated at 364b, avenue de Tervueren/Tervurenlaan, opposite Woluwe Park.

== Location ==
The museum is housed in part of an old tram depot in the Brussels municipality of Woluwe-Saint-Pierre. The tram depot consists of two parts: one part containing the museum and maintenance areas for the historic trams and the other part that is still used by the Brussels Intercommunal Transport Company (STIB/MIVB).

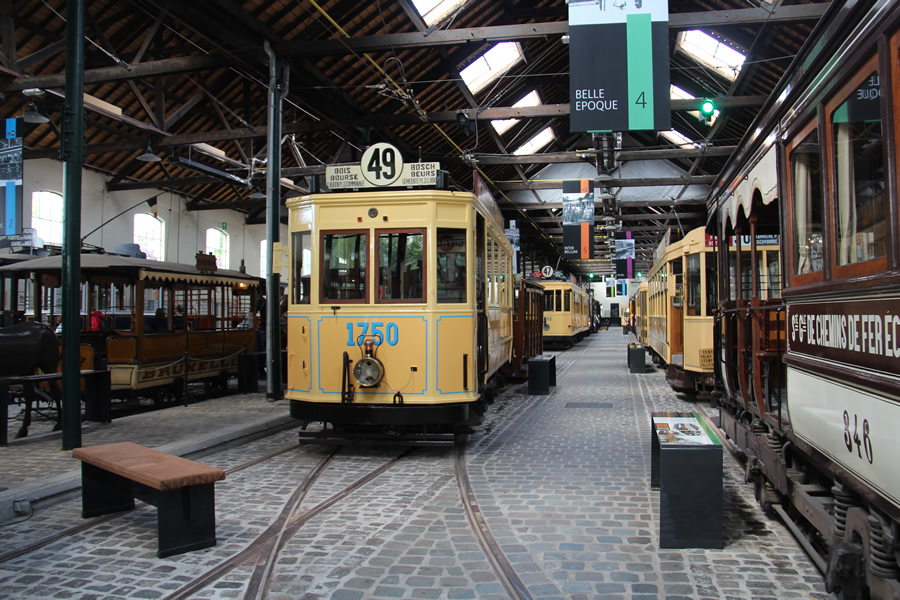
Interior view

== History ==
=== Woluwe depot ===
The first tram depot at this location dates back to 1897 and was built as part of the International Exposition of 1897. Its history is closely linked to the prestigious Avenue de Tervueren/Tervurenlaan, realised in 1896–97 by the contractor Edmond Parmentier, based on plans by the architect and urbanist Victor Besme. The avenue and tramline were constructed at the behest of King Leopold II to connect the exhibition sites at the Parc du Cinquantenaire/Jubelpark and the Palace of the Colonies, in the suburb of Tervuren. Parmentier received a 50-year concession for the line, which he transferred to the Société Anonyme du Chemin de Fer à Voie Étroite de Bruxelles à Ixelles-Boendael (BIB). The narrow-gauge line was inaugurated in May 1897, with the Woluwe depot then comprising a single shed, a small workshop, a power station, and an administrative building.

After the BIB was taken over by Les Tramways Bruxellois in 1899, the line was upgraded to standard gauge, like the rest of the Brussels tramway network. In 1907–08, the depot was expanded: the storage capacity tripled, the workshop and power station were demolished, two new sheds were built and extended to Bovenberg, and the administrative building was enlarged with a residence along the Rue du Leybeek/Leybeekstraat. The depot remained largely unchanged until 1941, when the rear of the first shed was converted to a staff canteen, offices, and workshops. By 1952, the Woluwe depot covered 12,000 m^{2} (130,000 sq ft), had 3,930 m (12,890 ft) of indoor tracks, a capacity of 285 vehicles, and operated 14 tram lines.

=== Museum ===
Around 1976, the first two halls of the depot were out of use. In September 1976, these halls were gradually abandoned and transformed into exhibition halls to establish a transport museum. The first exhibitions were held in June 1977. STIB/MIVB decided to convert these halls into an exhibition space where historic vehicles have been on display since 1977.

In 1982, STIB/MIVB entrusted the management of the museum to the non-profit organisation Brussels Urban Transport Museum (French: Musée du transport urbain bruxellois (MTUB), Dutch: Museum voor het Stedelijk Vervoer te Brussel (MSVB)), whose first members were mostly STIB/MIVB staff and public transit enthusiasts. It consists entirely of volunteers, many of whom are also (former) STIB/MIVB staff members. Although both the buildings and the collection are owned by STIB/MIVB, they are maintained by the volunteers of the non-profit organisation.

The building was designated a historic monument on 29 November 2001. It was thoroughly renovated between 2006 and 2009. Nowadays, the third hall remains an active STIB/MIVB depot, housing about 30 trams that serve lines 39, 44, and part of line 8. Over the coming years, it will be partly rebuilt to its 1945 condition.

== Presentation ==
=== Exhibits ===
The museum has a collection of around 130 vehicles (including trams, trailers, buses and trolleybuses)—all owned by STIB/MIVB—which, over the course of 150 years, have operated public transport in Brussels or, in the form of work wagons, helped support it. There are five horse-drawn trams, dating from 1868 to 1891; a steam tram from 1920; and 30 electric trams dating from 1888 to 1963. There are also 11 trailers dating from 1888 to 1935. Road vehicles include 22 buses, dating from 1939 to 1978; and two trolleybuses, from 1939 and 1956. Many of the motor vehicles are in roadworthy condition and some are operated with an (open) trailer. In addition, the collection includes a number of service vehicles, including ladder trucks and a car, as well as other items relating to public transport, including destination plates and an electrical substation.

=== Tourist trips ===
In 1988, the museum trialled vintage tram rides round the city on several Sundays in Summer. The response was very successful and trips now take place on Saturdays and Sundays in Summer using both trams and buses. In addition, special runs are made along the Rue Royale/Koningsstraat and the Avenue Louise/Louizalaan on certain days of the year.

== Gallery ==
=== Trams ===
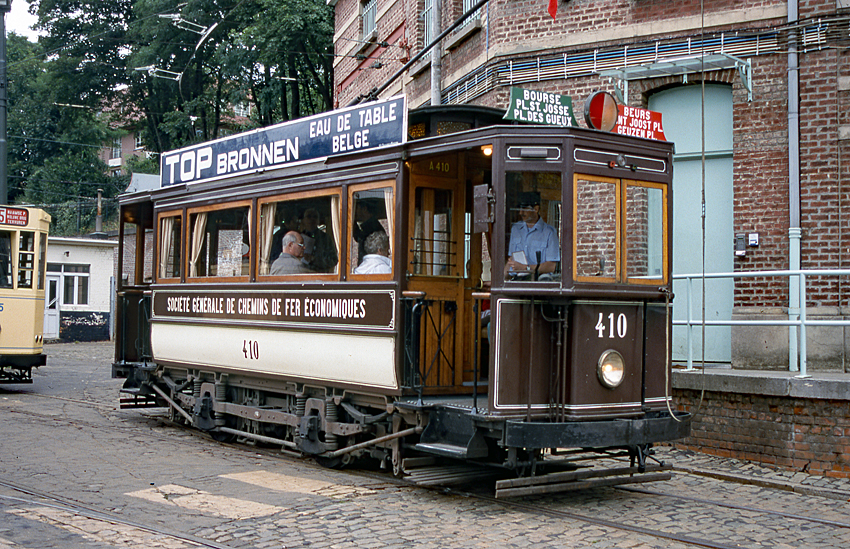
CFE tram 410 (1903)

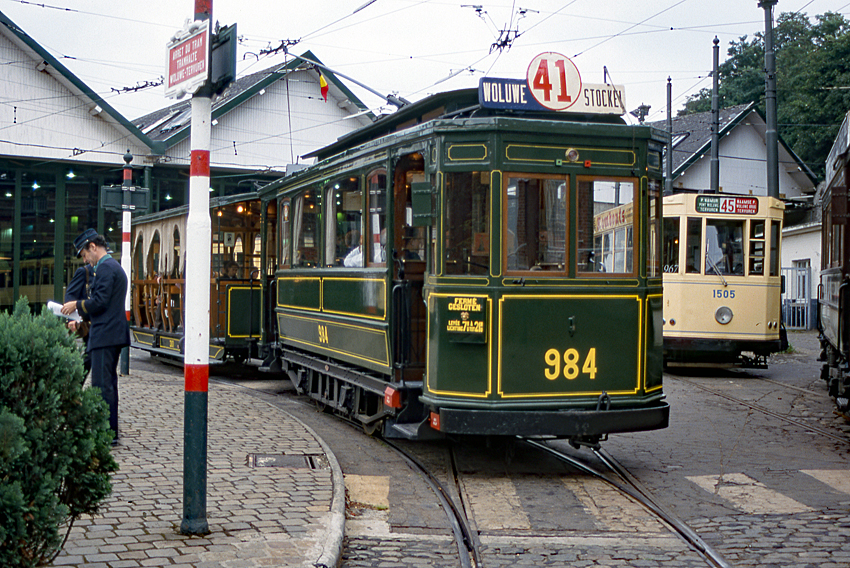
TB tram 984 and trailer 301 (1906)

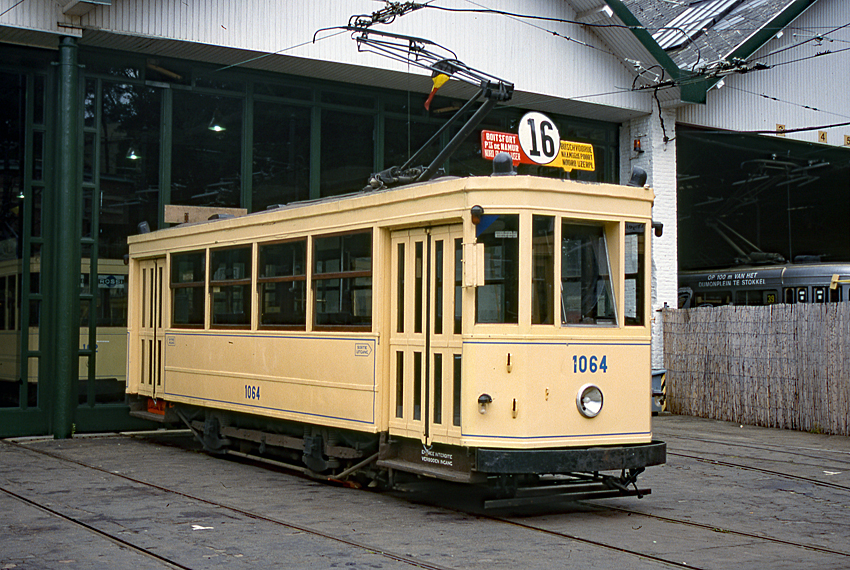
1064 ATB Standard tram (1934)

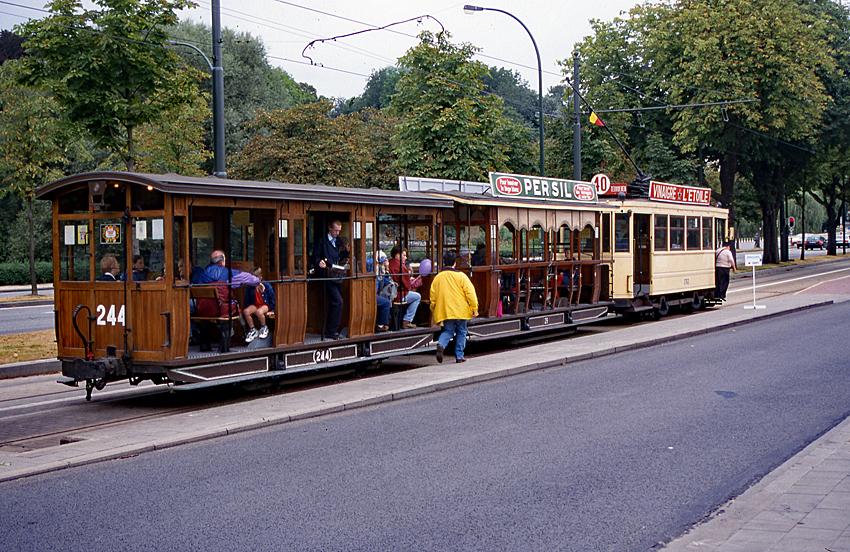
1763 ATB Standard tram hauling trailers 29 and 244

=== Buses ===
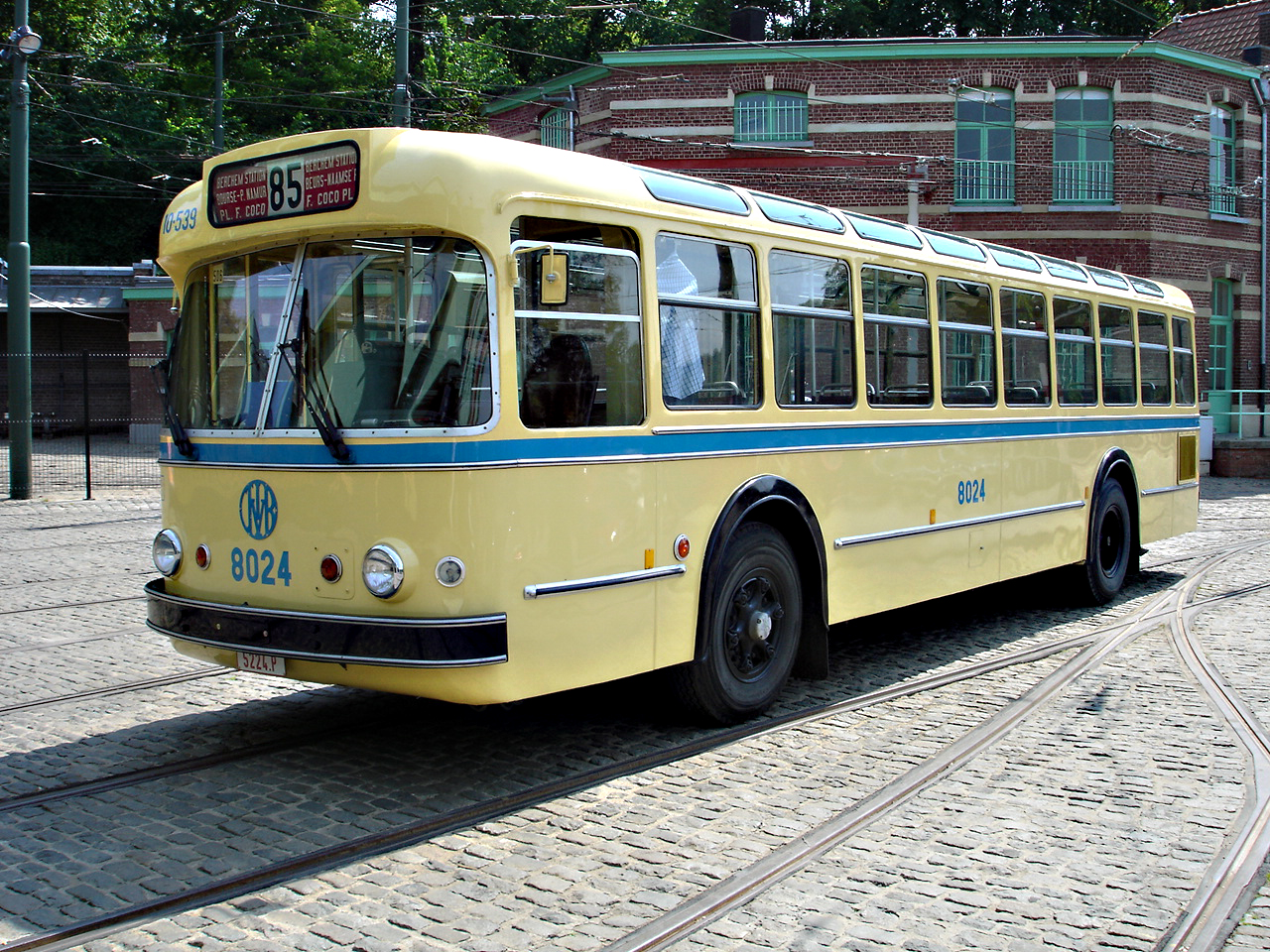
8024 Brossel A96 Rhageno bus (1956)

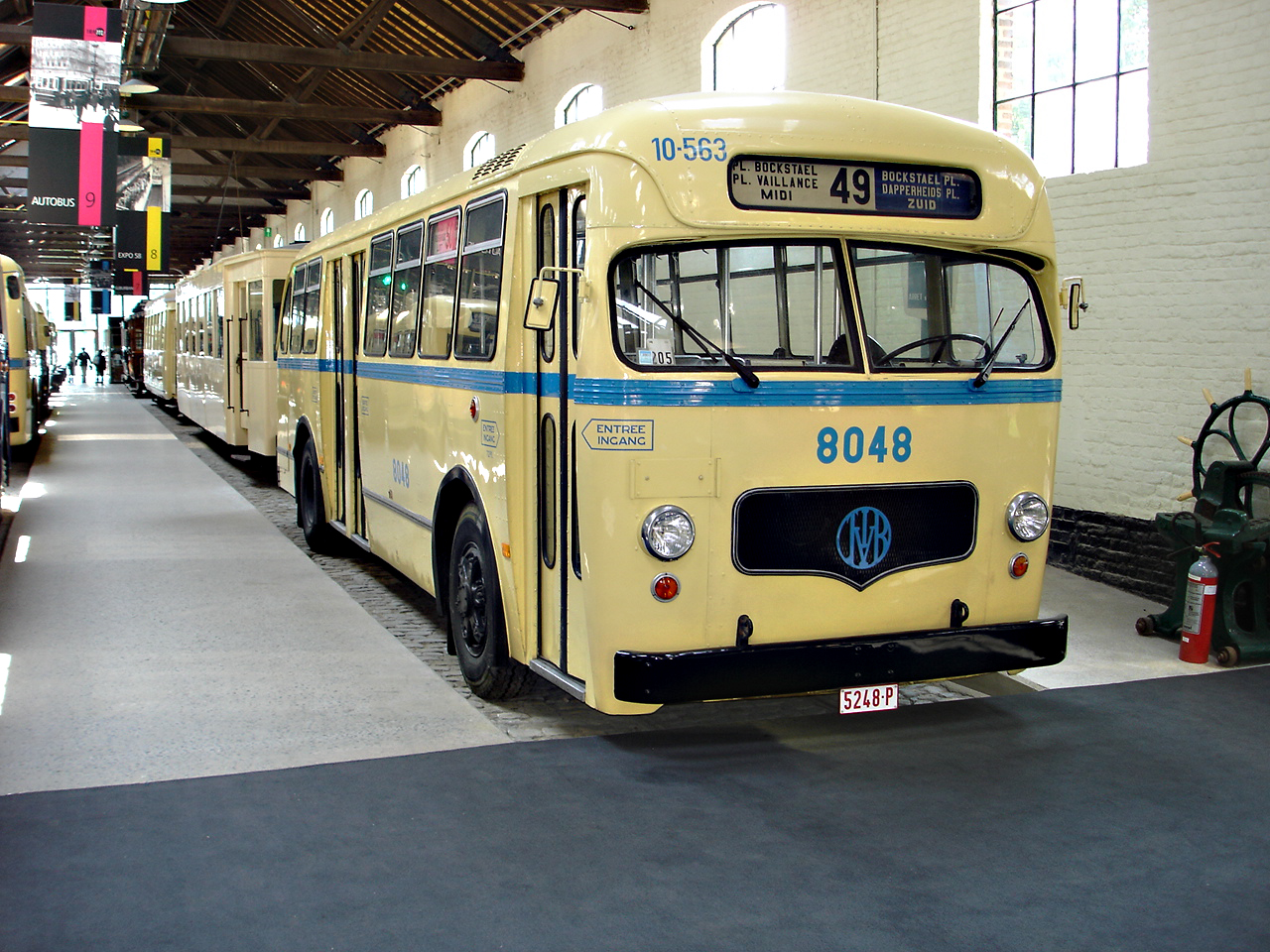
8048 Atelier Belges Réunis bus (1957)

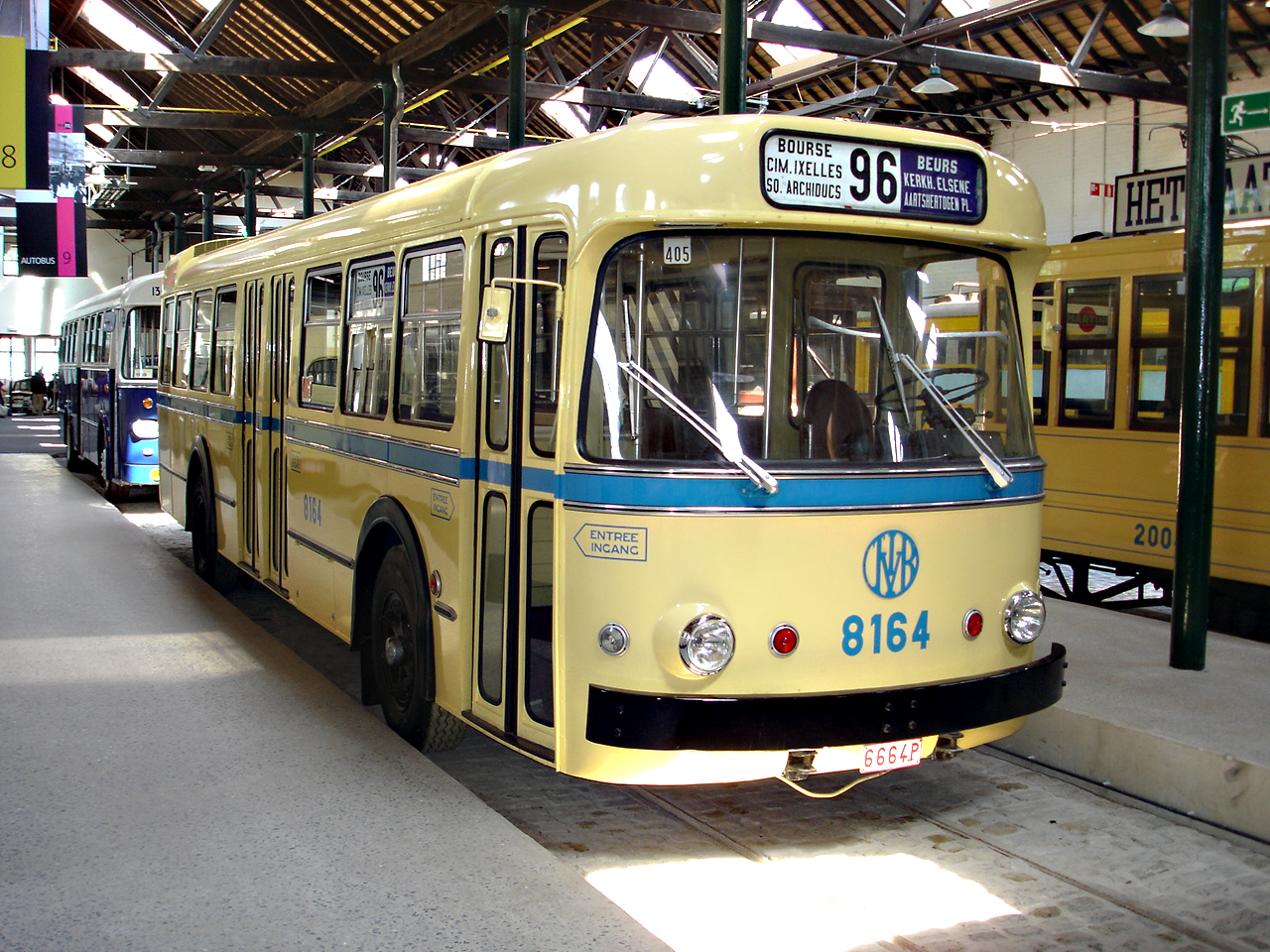
8164 Brossel A99 van Hool bus (1958)

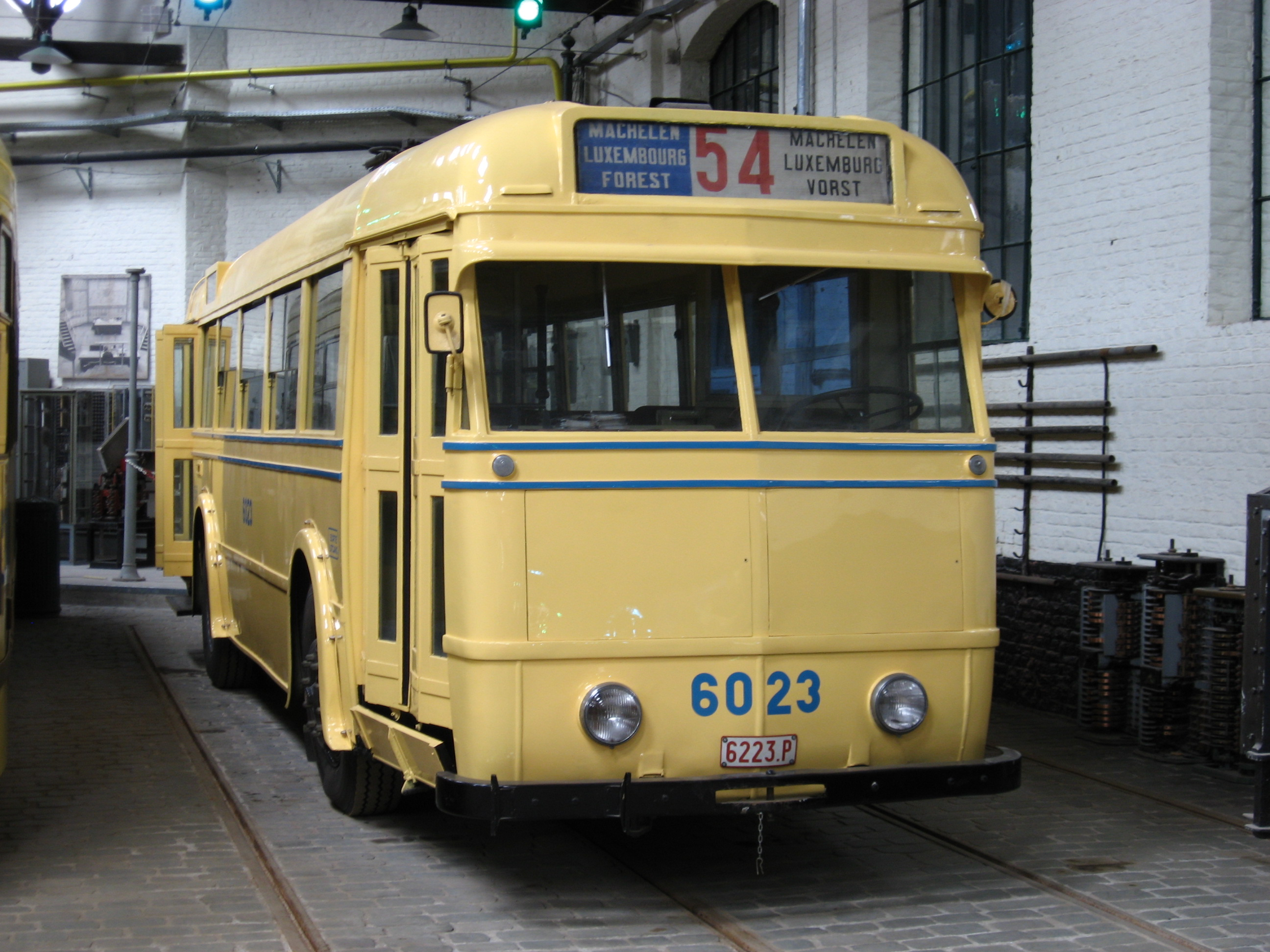
6023 Brossel ACEC trolleybus (1963)

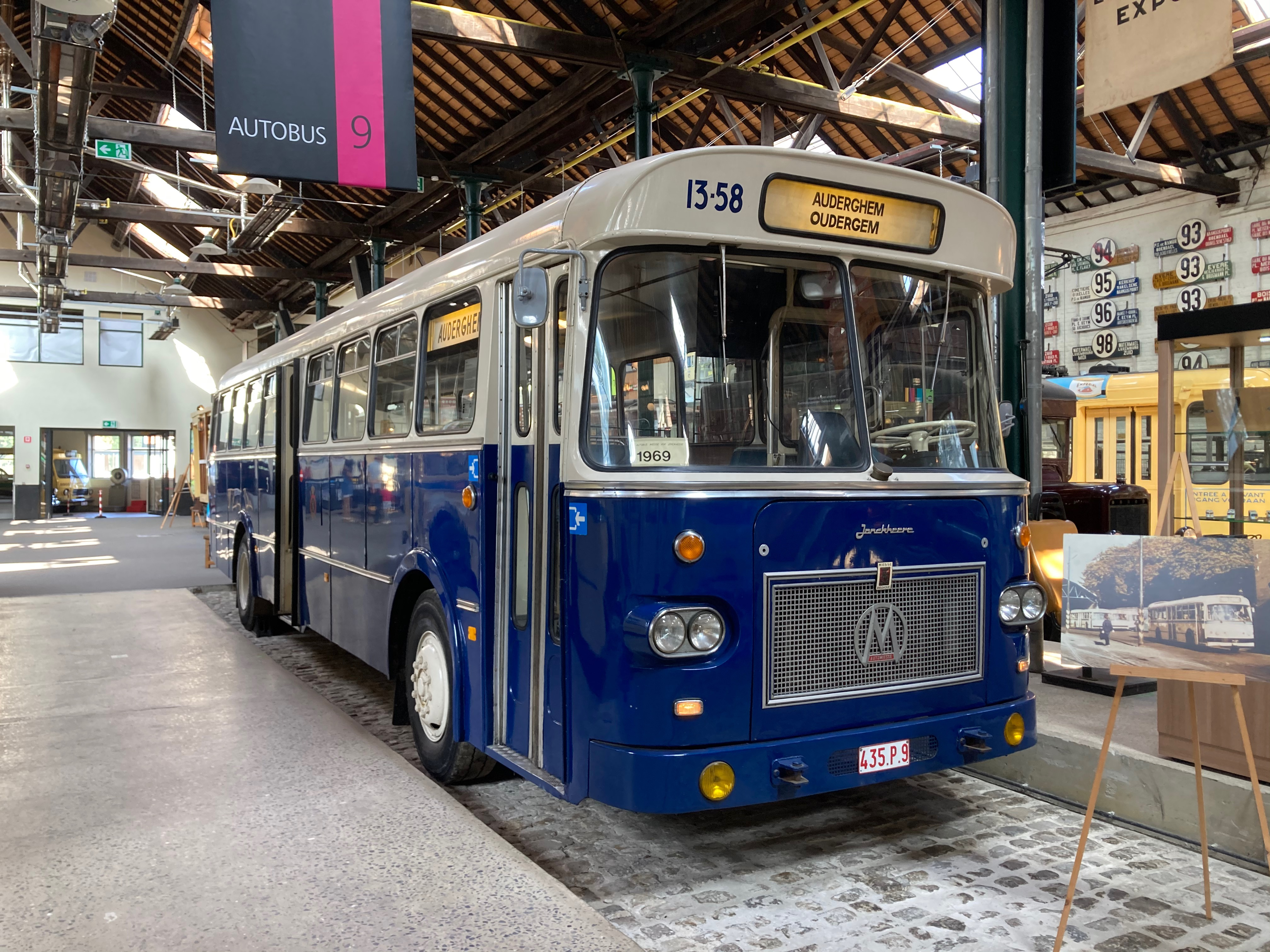
1358 Miesse VGX/Jonckheere Pullman bus (1969)

== See also ==
- List of museums in Brussels
- History of Brussels
- Belgium in the long nineteenth century
