= International German School of Brussels =

Coordinates: 50.8525°N 4.4922°E

- (German: Internationale Deutsche Schule Brüssel)
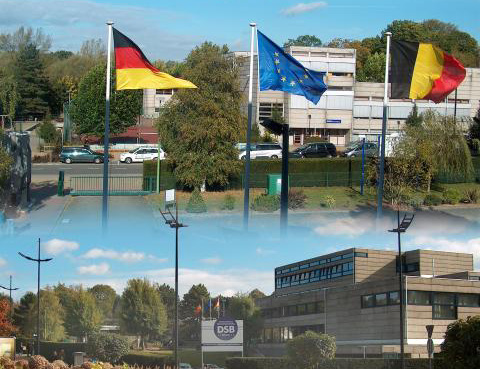
- Site campus
- Lange Eikstraat 71, Wezembeek-Oppem, Flemish Brabant; Belgium

Information
- Former name: German School of Brussels (German: Deutsche Schule Brüssel)
- Established: 1803
- Principal: Jochen Flohn
- Staff: 80
- Enrollment: 560
- Language: German
- Website: Official website

International German School of Brussels (German: Internationale Deutsche Schule Brüssel, iDSB) is a German international school in Wezembeek-Oppem, Flemish Brabant, Belgium, near Brussels. Founded in 1803, it has around 560 students and 80 staff.

== Notable former pupils ==
- Sophie Tassignon, Belgian jazz singer and composer
- Fabian Thylmann, German businessman and investor
- Christine von Brühl, German writer and journalist
