= Wezembeek-Oppem =

- Municipality
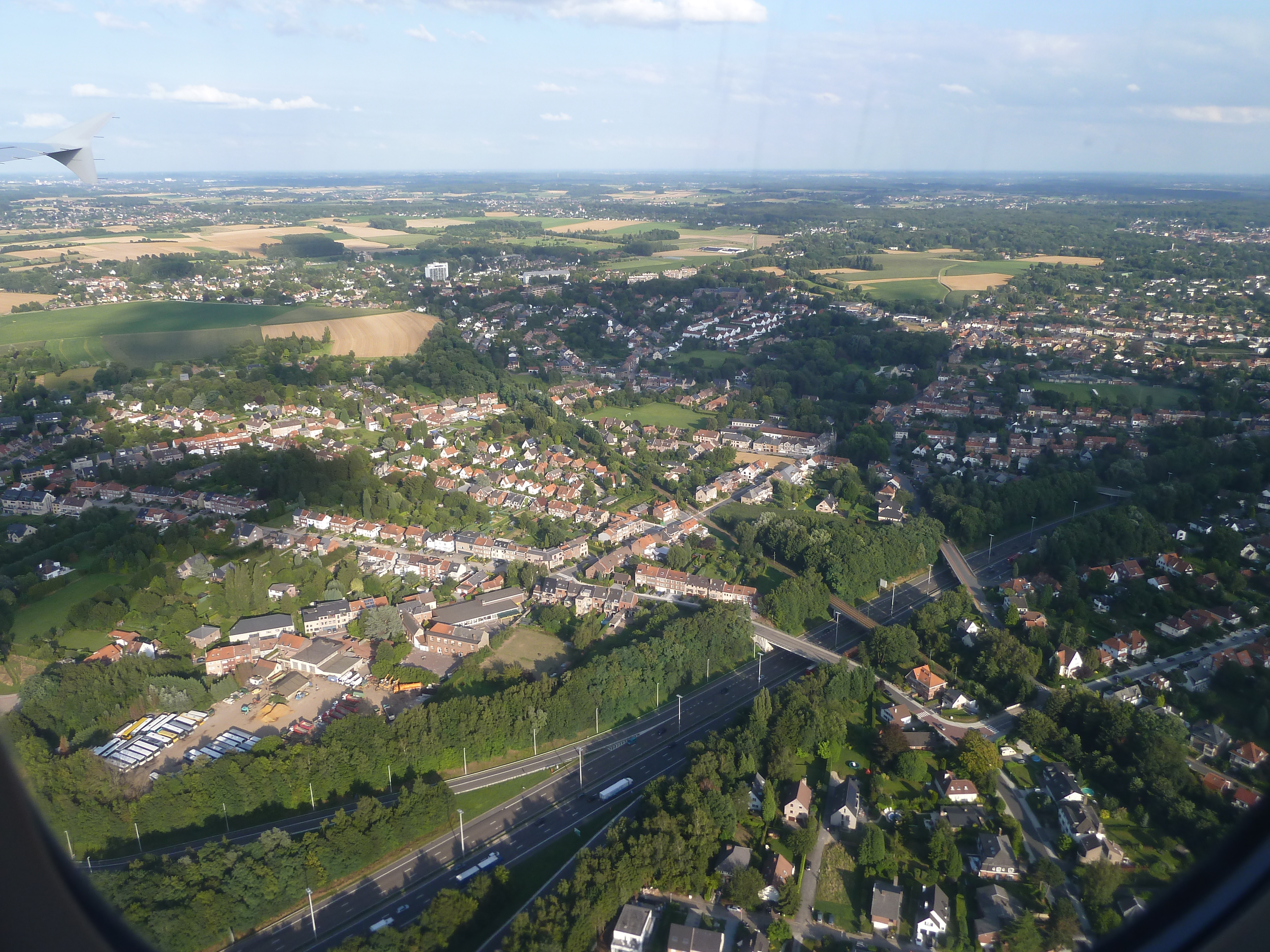

- Flag Coat of arms

- Location of Wezembeek-Oppem in Flemish Brabant
- Interactive map of Wezembeek-Oppem
- Location in Belgium
- Coordinates: 50°51′N 04°29′E
- Country: Belgium
- Community: Flemish Community
- Region: Flemish Region
- Province: Flemish Brabant
- Arrondissement: Halle-Vilvoorde

Government
  - Mayor: Frédéric Petit (LB-Union)
  - Governing party: LB-Union

Area
  - Total: 6.86 km^{2} (2.65 sq mi)

Population (2018-01-01)
  - Total: 14,021
  - Density: 2,040/km^{2} (5,290/sq mi)
- Postal codes: 1970
- NIS code: 23103
- Area codes: 02
- Website: www.wezembeek-oppem.be

Wezembeek-Oppem (Dutch: [ˈʋeːzəmbeːk ˈɔpəm]) is a municipality in the province of Flemish Brabant, in the Flemish region of Belgium, 10 kilometres (6.2 mi) east of the centre of Brussels. The municipality only comprises the town of Wezembeek-Oppem proper. On January 1, 2016, Wezembeek-Oppem had a total population of 14,095. The total area is 6.82 km^{2} (2.63 sq mi), which gives a population density of 2,066/km^{2} (5,350/sq mi). It is essentially a suburb of Brussels and was a component of the short-lived Arrondissement of Brussels-Periphery, although it does not directly adjoin any part of the Brussels-Capital Region. The Brussels Ring (R0) orbital motorway bisects the municipality.

Wezembeek-Oppem is home to a large community of international expatriates, in part because of the presence of the Internationale Deutsche Schule Brüssel (iDSB) in Wezembeek-Oppem itself, and the British School of Brussels in nearby Tervuren.

== Languages ==
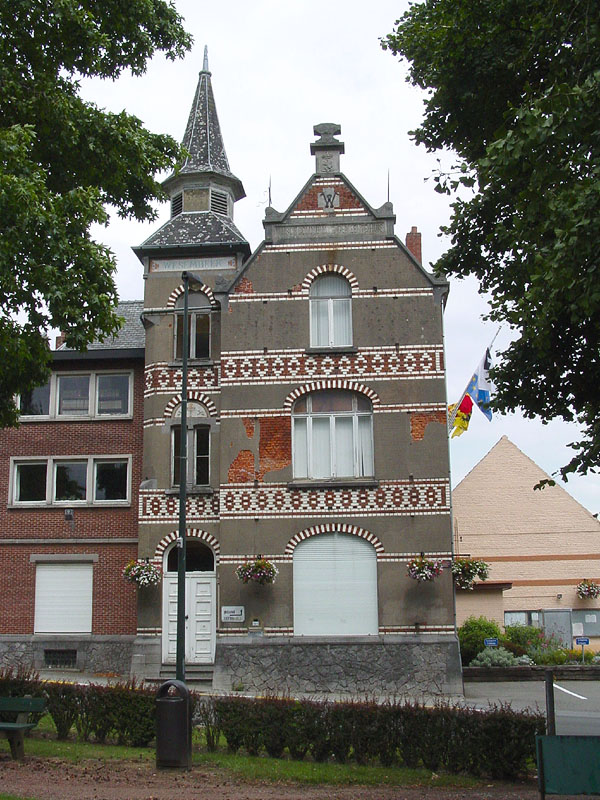
Wezembeek-Oppem town hall

Wezembeek-Oppem is one of the six municipalities with language facilities in the Flemish Region surrounding the Brussels-Capital Region. Wezembeek-Oppem is the only one of these that does not border Brussels directly since a narrow strip of land belonging to the neighbouring municipality of Kraainem lies in between the closest city boundary at Stockel (Woluwe-Saint-Pierre).

When the last official language census was taken in 1947, just under 30% of the population in Wezembeek-Oppem had French as their mother tongue. In 1963, when the official language border was finalised in Belgium, the municipality was designed as officially Dutch-speaking, however with facilities for French-speakers. In 1993, when Belgium was turned into a federation, the municipality was included in the newly established Flemish Region.

The official language is Dutch (as everywhere in Flanders), but the facility status means citizens have the right to request official documents from the local administration in French, may get primary school education in French as well as certain other public services.

== Orphanage in World War II ==
During the Nazi German occupation in the Second World War, Wezembeek was the home of an orphanage set up by the Association of Belgian Jews (AJB), a Judenrat-like authority forcibly organised by the German occupational force and collaborating with the Nazis. The orphanage was for Jewish children whose parents had been murdered in Nazi extermination camps. From August 1944, the AJB, under hard pressure of the Comité de Défense des Juifs, decided to hide the children until the end of the occupation. The children were dispersed to Catholic schools, orphanages and other locations. During the Battle of the Bulge in December 1944 and January 1945, the children survived bombardment by American and British forces while in the basements of homes, schools and orphanages which were occupied by Nazi troops resisting the Allied forces. Children who were at the orphanage and survived include Regina Feld Glinzman (born 1935 as Rosa Feld in Antwerp) and Estelle Alter (born 1936 as Stella Feld in Antwerp).

== Education ==
- The International German School of Brussels is located in the municipality.
- The Saint-Hart College is located in the municipality.
