= Peter van Huffel =

Canadian musician (born 1978)

- Born: 6 September 1978 (age 47); Kingston, Ontario, Canada
- Genres: Jazz
- Occupations: Musician, composer
- Instruments: Alto saxophone, Baritone saxophone, Soprano saxophone, clarinet
- Years active: 2002–present
- Member of: Gorilla Mask
- Formerly of: House of Mirrors; The Scrambling EX; Peter Van Huffel Quintet; Peter Van Huffel Quartet; Peter Van Huffel Octet; Boom Crane; Animal Forum; Kronix
- Spouse: Sophie Tassignon (divorced)
- Website: petervanhuffel.com

Peter van Huffel (born September 6, 1978 in Kingston, Ontario) is a Canadian jazz saxophonist, clarinetist and composer based in Berlin.

== Biography ==
Van Huffel grew up in Kingston, Ontario. He first learned to play the clarinet at the age of twelve, but switched to the alto saxophone at the age of 13. In 1997, he attended Humber College in Toronto, where he studied jazz under Pat LaBarbera and Don Thompson, and graduated from in 2001. His music career also began in Toronto. From 2002 to 2008, he lived in New York City. He earned a master's degree from the Manhattan School of Music. During this time, he made a name for himself in the local jazz scene and performed alongside jazz musicians Chris Potter, Clarence Penn and Donny McCaslin. He released his first independent album Mind Over Matter in 2003. He released the album of On Common Ground in 2005 and the album Silvester Battlefield in 2007 by the "Peter van Huffel Quintet".

In 2008, he moved to Berlin. He cooperated, among other things, with his then-wife, the Belgian vocalist Sophie Tassignon, the Canadian-Ukrainian guitarist Alex Maksymiw, German guitarist Andreas Willers and German batterist Oliver Steidle. In 2008, he released the album Hufflignon with Sophie Tassignon, bassist Michael Bates and trombonist Samuel Blaser. He formed the punk jazz trio "Gorilla Mask" with the German bassist Roland Fidezius and the German drummer Rudi Fischerlehner in 2009. He released five albums by "Gorilla Mask", with HOWL! being the first in 2012, followed by four albums on the Portuguese label Clean Feed Records. In 2009, he formed the "Peter van Huffel Quartet" with Jesse Stacken, Miles Perkin and German batterist Samuel Rohre, and released their album Like the Rusted Key in 2010 on Fresh Sound/New Talent Records.

== Discography ==
- 2003: Peter Van Huffel Mind Over Matter (PVH Records)
- 2005: Peter Van Huffel Quintet 566 On Common Ground (PVH Records)
- 2007: Animal Forum (Peter Van Huffel/Samuel Blaser/Ziv Ravitz) Animal Forum (ZPS)
- 2007: Peter van Huffel Quintet (Peter Van Huffel/Scott DuBois/Jesse Stacken/Michael Bates/Jeff Davis) Silvester Battlefield (Fresh Sound New Talent)
- 2008: Peter van Huffel/Sophie Tassignon Hufflignon (Clean Feed Records)
- 2010: Peter van Huffel Quartet (Peter van Huffel/Jesse Stacken/Miles Perkin/Samuel Rohrer) Like the Rusted Key (Fresh Sound New Talent)
- 2012: Gorilla Mask (Peter van Huffel/Roland Fidezius/Rudi Fischerlehner) HOWL! (Between the Lines)
- 2013: House of Mirrors (Peter van Huffel/Sophie Tassignon/Julie Sassoon/Miles Perkin) Act One (WismART)
- 2014: Boom Crane (Peter van Huffel/Michael Bates/Jeff Davis) Boom Crane (Fresh Sound New Talent)
- 2014: Gorilla Mask (Peter van Huffel/Roland Fidezius/Rudi Fischerlehner) Bite My Blues (Clean Feed Records)
- 2015: The Scrambling Ex (Peter van Huffel/Andreas Willers/Oliver Steidle) The Scrambling Ex (FMR Records)
- 2016: KRONIX (Peter van Huffel/Alex Maksymiw) KRONIX (Fresh Sound New Talent)
- 2017: Gorilla Mask (Peter van Huffel/Roland Fidezius/Rudi Fischerlehner) Iron Lung (Clean Feed Records)
- 2019: Gorilla Mask (Peter van Huffel/Roland Fidezius/Rudi Fischerlehner) Brain Drain (Clean Feed Records)
- 2022: Gorilla Mask (Peter van Huffel/Roland Fidezius/Rudi Fischerlehner) Mind Raid (Clean Feed Records)
