= Kraainem =

Municipality in Flanders, Belgium

- Municipality
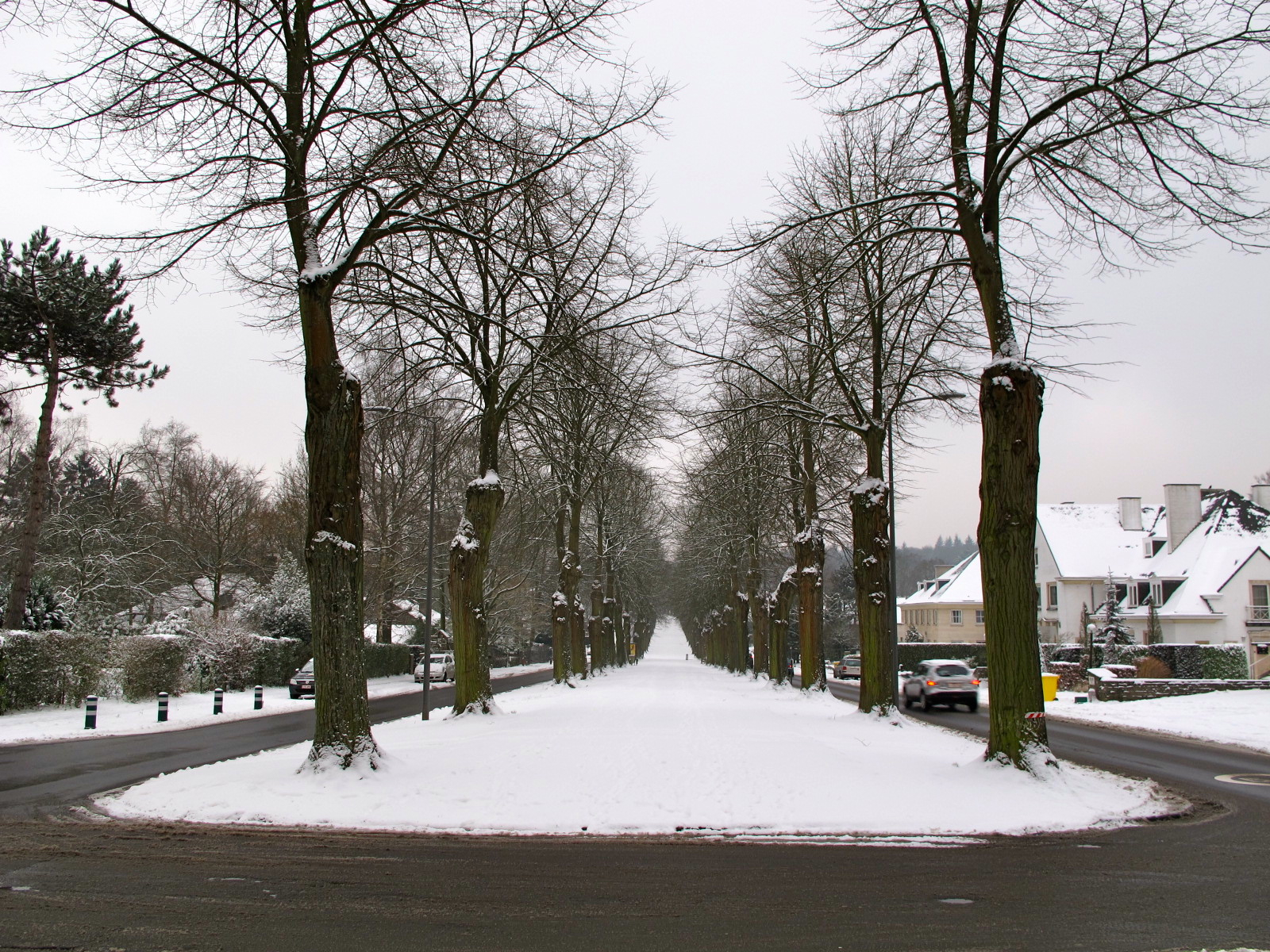
- Avenue Baron Albert d'Huart

- Flag Coat of arms

- Location of Kraainem in Flemish Brabant
- Interactive map of Kraainem
- Location in Belgium
- Coordinates: 50°52′N 04°28′E
- Country: Belgium
- Community: Flemish Community
- Region: Flemish Region
- Province: Flemish Brabant
- Arrondissement: Halle-Vilvoorde

Government
  - Mayor: Bertrand Waucquez (Kraainem-Unie)
  - Governing parties: Kraainem-Unie, LB

Area
  - Total: 5.84 km^{2} (2.25 sq mi)

Population (2018-01-01)
  - Total: 13,690
  - Density: 2,340/km^{2} (6,070/sq mi)
- Postal codes: 1950
- NIS code: 23099
- Area codes: 02
- Website: www.kraainem.be

Kraainem (Dutch pronunciation: [ˈkraːinɛm]) (Note: Sometimes unofficially spelt Crainhem in French, pronounced [kʁajnɛm].) is a municipality in the province of Flemish Brabant, in the Flemish region of Belgium. The municipality only comprises the town of Kraainem proper. On January 1, 2006, Kraainem had a total population of 13,150. The total area is 5.80 km^{2} (2.24 sq mi), which gives a population density of 2,266/km^{2} (5,870/sq mi). A suburb of Brussels, it directly borders the Stockel/Stokkel and Kapelleveld neighbourhoods (Woluwe-Saint-Pierre municipality) within the city, and was a component of the short-lived Arrondissement of Brussels-Periphery.

Kraainem is a municipality with language facilities in Flanders, where the sole official language is Dutch. In 1954, however, special linguistic facilities were granted to local French speakers, who were then still a minority. They can request official documents from the local administration in French. Today, a majority of the inhabitants are French-speaking.

== Urbanisation ==
The forest of Stokkel belonged to the d'Huart family until the 1920s. When grandfather d'Huart died in 1927, his family decided to found "la Société Immobilière de Stockel" and built a lane through the forest. This lane is the current Albert d'Huartlaan that used to be covered with gravel until 1960.

The homes surrounding the "Hurlevent" were built and afterwards those of the society of Utrecht. The real construction started in 1930 and accelerated after the second world war. Approximately 2800 people lived in Kraainem in 1940, 3254 in 1945 and 5190 in 1954, which was the year in which urbanisation really experienced its surge.

In 1949 the social housing of Eigen Haard were built followed by the Josephine Charlotte neighbourhood in 1954. Over 11,000 persons lived in the Kraainem region in 1967. In 1993, of a total population of 12,780 residents, 2,623 were immigrants. Despite being located in Flanders, Kraainem became increasingly francophone during the 20th century, reducing the Dutch-speakers to a minority. Communal politics is centred upon the language issue. Given the commune's proximity and good transport links to the airport, to NATO and to the European Quarter, an increasing number of non-Belgians have settled in the municipality and this trend looks set to continue as the few remaining greenfield sites are developed.

The commune has two state schools, one Dutch and one francophone, and in 1968 the new St-Dominicus chapel was inaugurated.

The southern end of the Albert d'Huartlaan boulevard feeds onto the Quatre Bras road intersection, where the Brussels Ring (R0) and Avenue de Tervueren (N3) meet (alongside a stop on the Brussels tram route 44). Other parts of the municipality are served by Brussels tram route 39, while three stations on Brussels Metro line 1 (including the one named Kraainem) are situated just over the boundary into the Brussels city-region.

== Tourism ==
Its rich industrial and cultural legacy, in addition to its favorable location next to Brussels and the Zaventem Airport, have enabled Kraainem to develop its position as a touristic destination in recent years. The 8th century St. Pancras Church, the 20th century Bouvier-Washer Cité and its Salesian monastery are popular attractions for tourists. A lack of local lodging infrastructure has slowed touristic development until the early 2000s, when guest houses and AirBnB resolved this shortcoming.

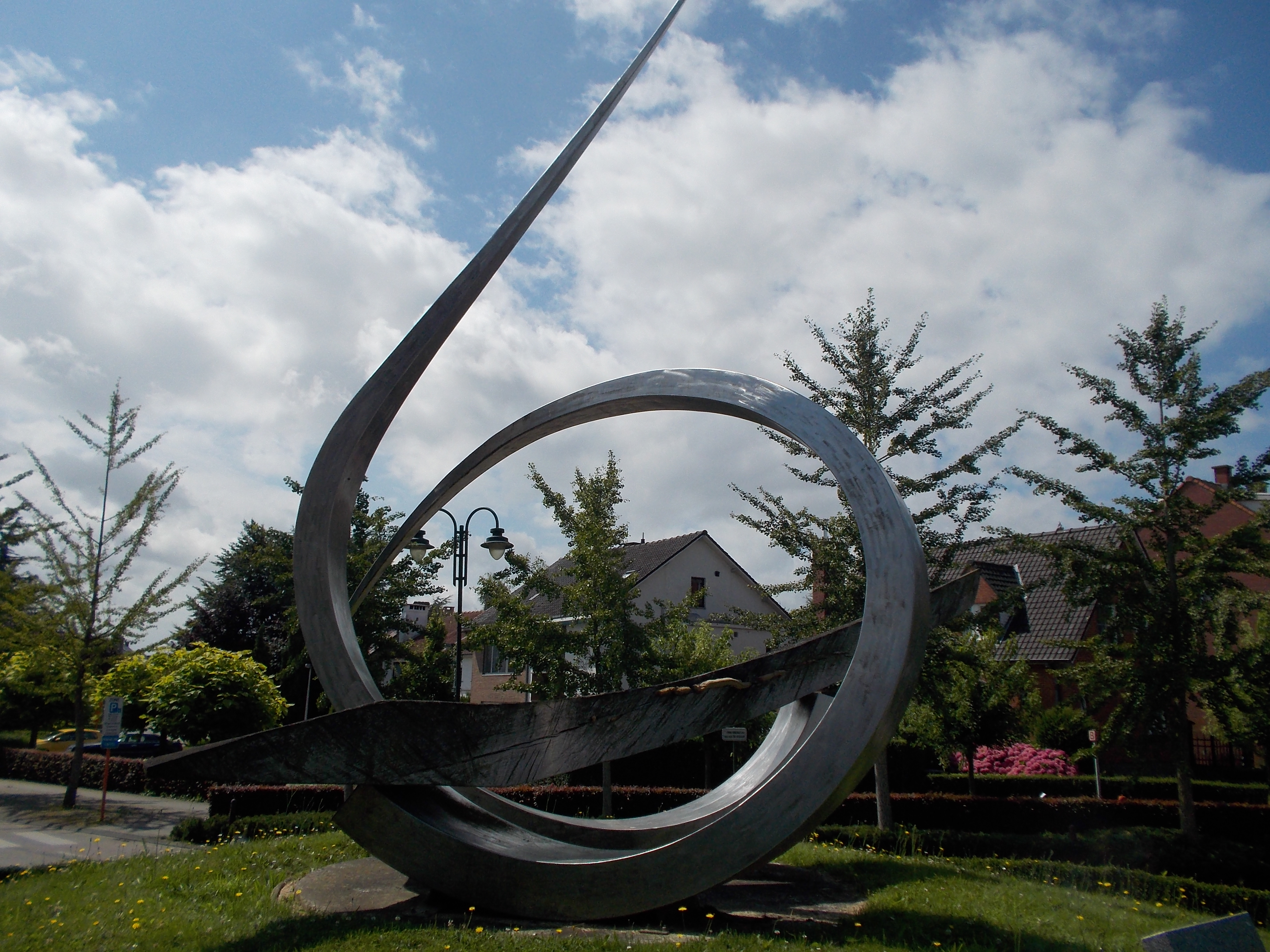
"Balance" in Kraainem, a memorial to the town's rich industrial legacy
