= Avenue de Tervueren =

Thoroughfare in Brussels, Belgium

Avenue de Tervueren (French); Tervurenlaan (Dutch)
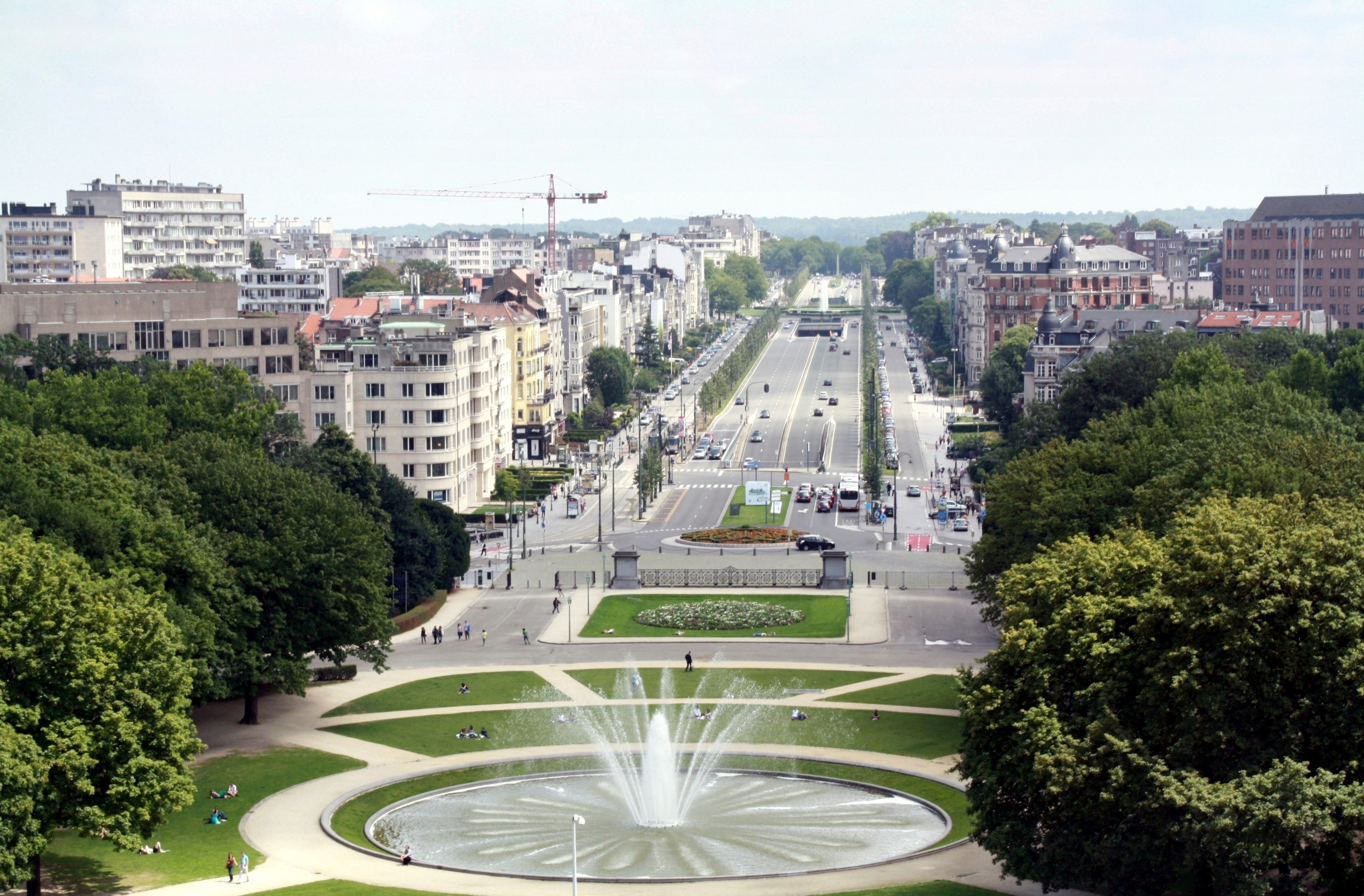
- The start of the Avenue de Tervueren at the Cinquantenaire/Jubelpark, looking east towards Square Montgomery/Montgomeryplein

- Location within Brussels Location within Belgium
- Namesake: Tervuren
- Type: Avenue
- Location: Brussels-Capital Region and Flemish Brabant, Belgium
- Coordinates: 50°50′12″N 04°24′42″E

Construction
- Completed: 1897

The Avenue de Tervueren (French, pronounced [avny də tɛʁvyʁœn]) or Tervurenlaan (Dutch, pronounced [tɛrˈvyːrə(n)ˌlaːn]) is a major thoroughfare in Brussels, Belgium. It was originally commissioned by King Leopold II as part of his building campaign, and was finished in 1897, in time for the Brussels International Exhibition of that year.

Geographically, the Avenue de Tervueren forms a continuation of the Rue de la Loi/Wetstraat, which ends at the western end of the Parc du Cinquantenaire/Jubelpark, running from Merode station in the west, connecting with Square Maréchal Montgomery/Maarschalk Montgomeryplein, passing through the municipality of Woluwe-Saint-Pierre and the Ring at Quatre Bras/Vier Armen, and finishing at the park in Tervuren. A tunnel starting just west of the Robert Schuman Roundabout takes the Rue de la Loi's main lane under the Cinquantenaire (with a short uncovered section in the centre of the park), and emerges at Merode as the Avenue de Tervueren's central lane.

Tram route 44 follows a large portion of the Avenue de Tervueren, from Montgomery station all the way to Tervuren. For much of the distance, it has a dedicated track. The road also has a cycle path for much of its length.

== History ==
This artery, like the Boulevard du Souverain/Vorstlaan, owes much to the initiative of King Leopold II. It was designed in connection with the Brussels International Exhibition of 1897, in order to link the two sites of the exhibition: the Parc du Cinquantenaire/Jubelpark and the Palace of the Colonies, in the suburb of Tervuren. The work was carried out by the contractor Edmond Parmentier, based on plans by the architect and urbanist Victor Besme, and was completed in 1897.

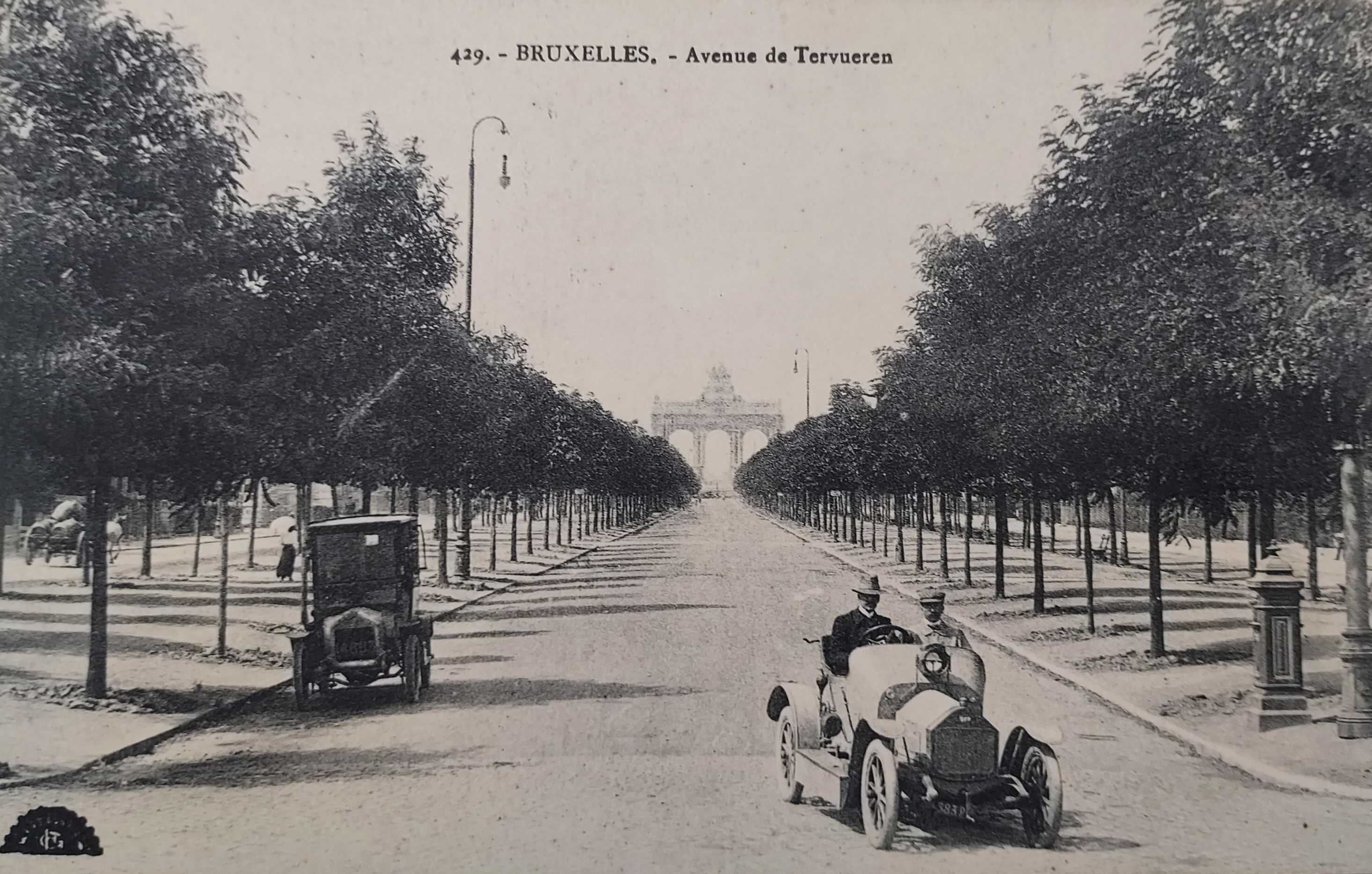
The Avenue de Tervueren in the early 20th century

The Cinquantenaire railway tunnel passes under the Avenue de Tervueren; the 200 metres (660 ft) of tunnel located under the avenue and the neighbouring houses have the particularity of having been built at the same time as the avenue, in 1896. The rest of the tunnel was built in stages, between 1910 and 1911, and from 1924 to 1926.

== Events ==
The annual Festival of the Avenue de Tervueren takes place each May. The road is closed to motor traffic from Merode down to Woluwe Park, market stalls and a flea market are set up and various family attractions and amusements draw crowds. In past years, the celebration has included fireworks, live music and events such as the cooking of a giant omelette. The celebration marks the anniversary of the road's opening.

== Notable buildings ==
The Avenue de Tervueren is home to many buildings in Beaux-Arts, Art Nouveau, Art Deco and eclectic styles, as well as the Brussels Tram Museum.

- No. 68–70: Former Institute for the Treatment of Eye Diseases of Doctor Coppez (1912) by Jean-Baptiste Dewin
- No. 110: Beaux-Arts apartment building (1927) by Antoine Varlet
- No. 166: Beaux-Arts hôtel particulier (1913) by Franz D'Ours
- No. 279–281: Stoclet Palace, a private mansion in the Vienna Secession style (1905–1911) by Josef Hoffmann, and a UNESCO World Heritage Site
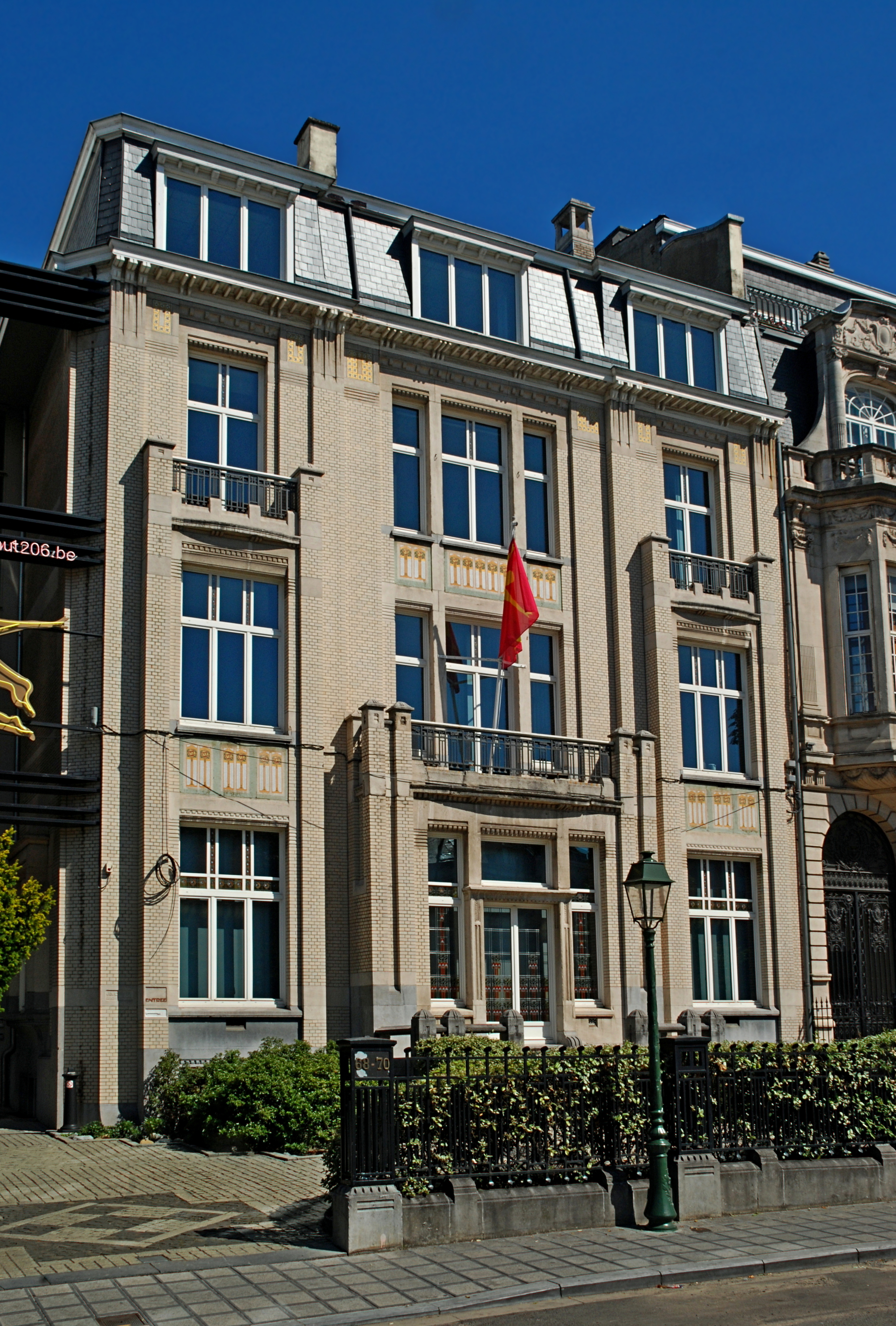
Former Institute for the Treatment of Eye Diseases of Doctor Coppez (Dewin, 1912)

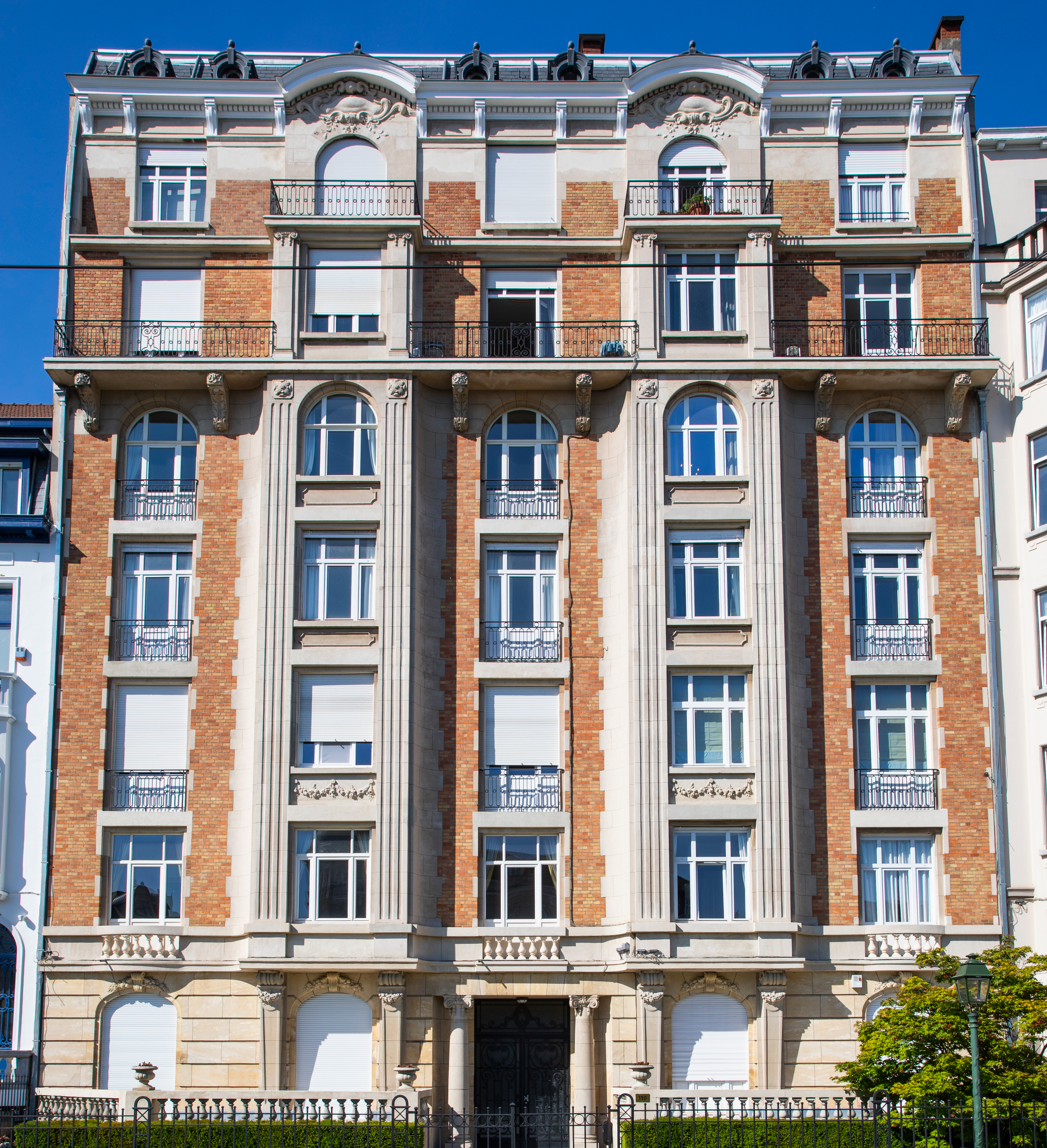
Apartment building (Varlet, 1927)

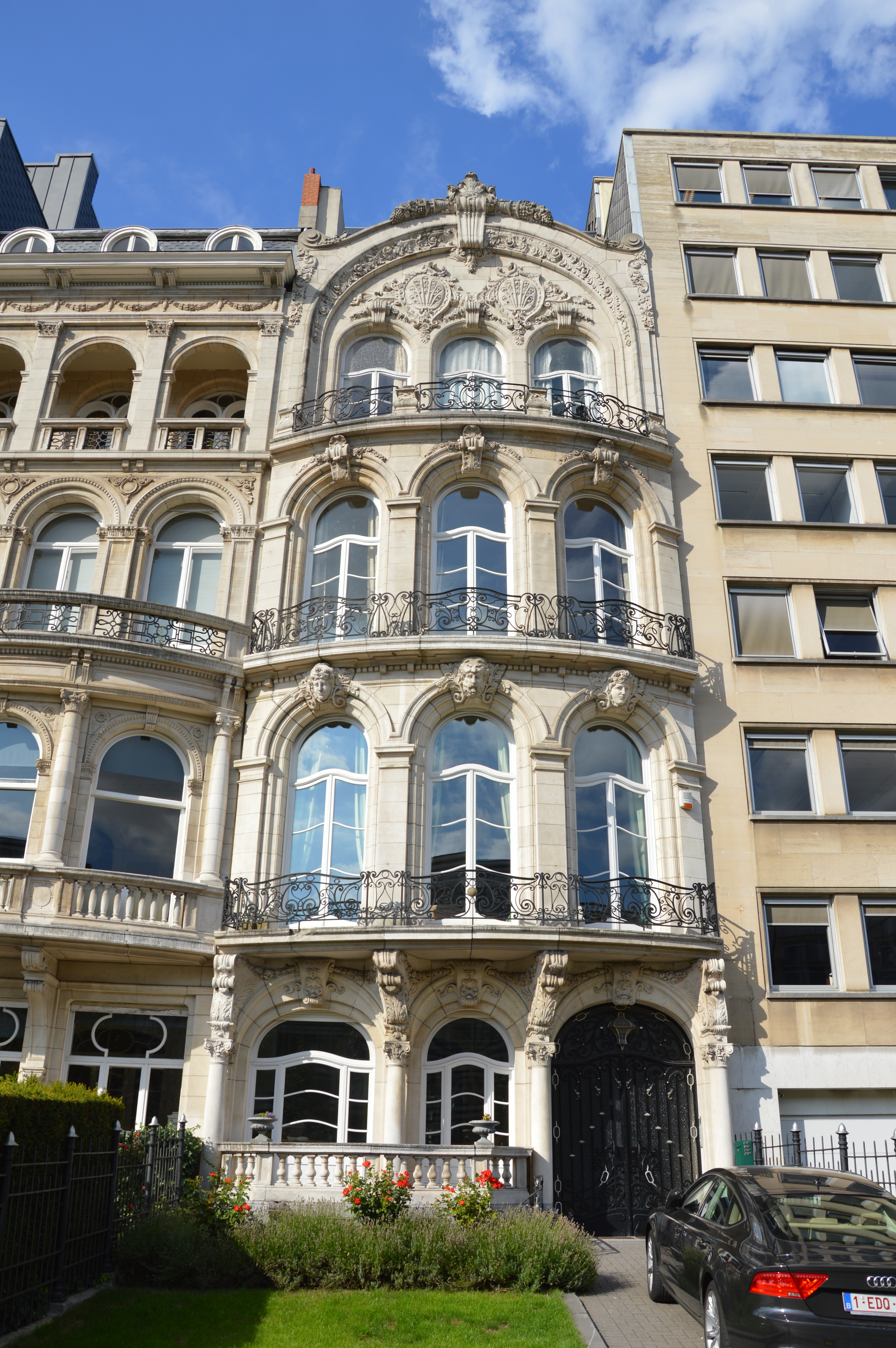
Hôtel particulier (D'Ours, 1913)

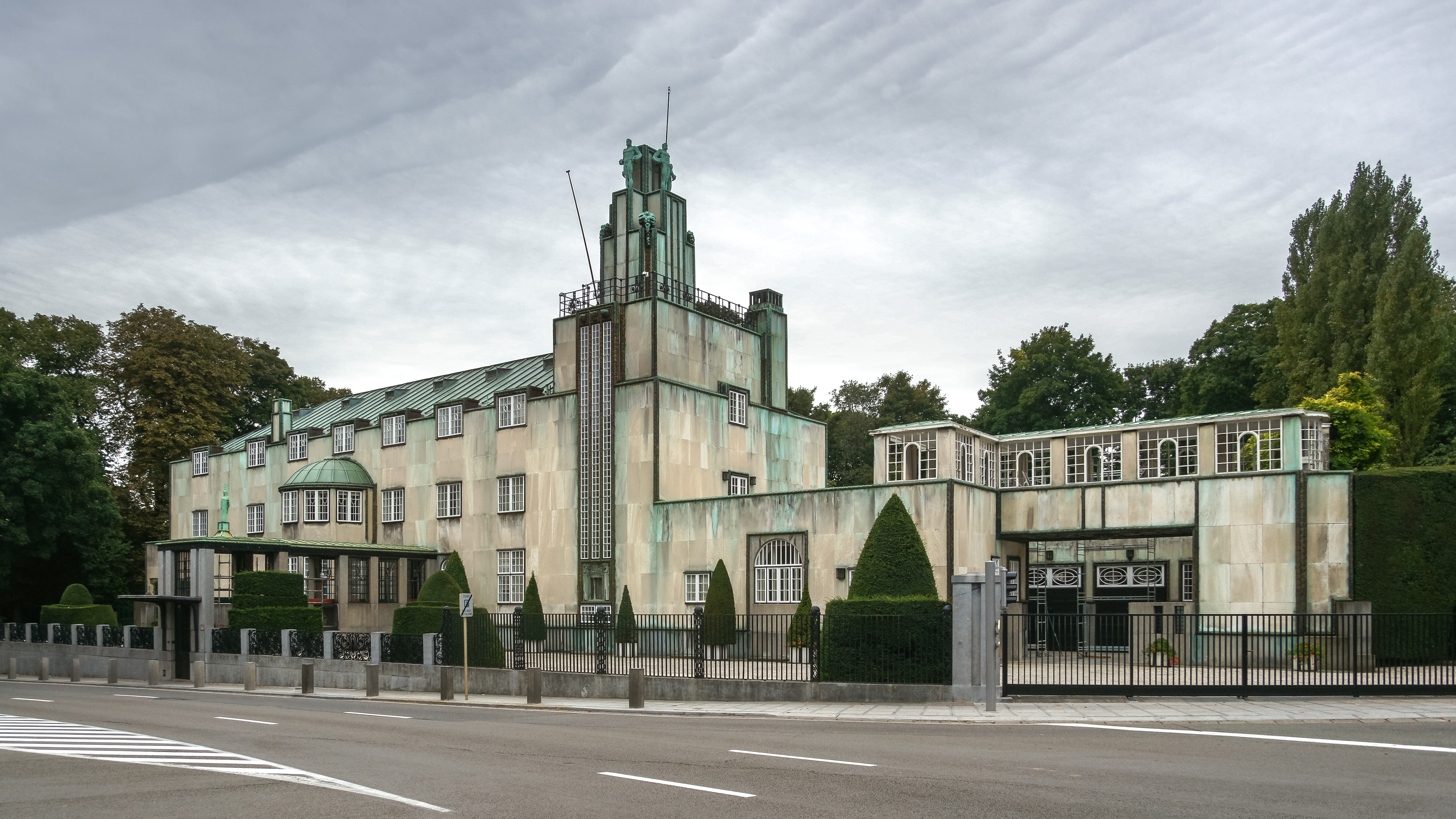
The Stoclet Palace (Hoffmann, 1905–1911)

== See also ==
- List of streets in Brussels
- Art Nouveau in Brussels
- Art Deco in Brussels
- History of Brussels
- Belgium in the long nineteenth century
