= WismART =

German record label

WismART Verlag e.K. NRW Records
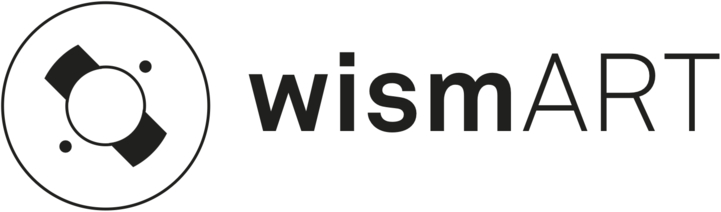
- Founded: 1992
- Founder: Jürgen Czisch
- Status: active
- Distributor(s): NRW Vertrieb - JazzWorksEurope - Fridtjof Weber (Berlin/Stuttgart); Martina Weinmar (Hamburg); Cord Gerken (Cologne)
- Genre: Jazz electroacoustic World music indie-rock pop
- Country of origin: Germany
- Location: Wismar, Germany
- Official website: wismart.de

WismART --- NRW Records is a German record label started in Essen in 1992 by producer Jürgen Czisch; the label was moved to Wismar in 2004. NRW has released albums by jazz, world music, electronic, indie-rock, pop, contemporary artists and groups such as Meike Goosmann, Christina Fuchs, Rosani Reis, Erdmöbel, Lecker Sachen, the WDR Big Band, Cologne and the NDR Big Band (Hamburg). Since its inception, the label has released on average 5 albums a year.

== History ==
Dortmund native Jürgen Czisch graduated from the State University of Music Westphalia-Lippe in the 1980s with a degree in piano performance. In 1992 he and classmate Andreas Seemer-Koeper started NRW Records in Essen, Germany. The label is named for the location of artists and groups the two producers felt were under-represented: 'North Rhine-Westphalia' Records. The company name of 'MV-NRW Musikverlag' stands for the exchange of composers between East and West German federal states.

Czisch moved NRW Records production location from Zeche Zollverein in Essen to Wismar in 2004 and incorporated the WismART name (WismART Verlag e.K.). The NRW recording studio has remained at the Essen location. The new production location in Mecklenburg-Western Pomerania was utilized to coordinate concerts with partners and artists organized by the Festspiele Mecklenburg-Vorpommern and the Schönberger Musiksommer. In addition to CD projects and production, NRW is involved with the film music genre. One of the highlights for NRW in the film music field is contributions to the soundtrack for the 2011 Academy Award nominated movie Pina by Wim Wenders. Under the WismART label umbrella, Czisch has developed several successful sub-labels: Clean Feed Records, NRW Records, Cinaire, A-Jazz, Bigband Records plus a big part of the ECM Records back catalogue.

Early on Czisch experimented with music of René Aubry and was able to attract and have success with controversial artists such as Ukrainian singer, songwriter Mariana Sadovska. Also on his roster have been jazz pianists Martin Ehlers and Oliver Maas. WismART/NRW also handles product distribution for the British, avant-garde jazz label Leo Records and Pirouet Records based in Munich. Czisch has also been handling part of the back catalog of ECM Records. The label is regularly involved with local and international music festivals and trade shows: Jazzahead (Bremen), Classical Next (Rotterdam) and Midem (Cannes). NRW artist Heiner Schmitz awarded the 2019 WDR Jazz Prize for Composition: compositions recorded on NRW jazz releases from 2012 and 2017.

== Recordings (partial list) ==
=== WismART/NRW Recordings (partial list) ===
Item #	Album	Label sublabel	Artist	Release Year
NRW2003	Erste Worte Nach Bad Mit Delfinen	NRW	Erdmöbel	1999
NRW2034	Everything Must Change	NRW	Orange Blossom	2004
NRW2039	Mosaico	NRW	Rosani Reis	2008
NRW2032	Kano	NRW	Tata Dindin/Hans Lüdemann	2009
Big1003	Balkan Jazz	Bigband	WDR Big Band	2010
A5005	Ral 3	Ajazz	Lutz Häfner	2011
Big1004	Odyssee	Bigband	Cologne Contemporary Jazz Orchestra, Christian Brückner	2012
A5014	Tender Tales	Ajazz	Meike Goosmann Quintet	2013
A5026	Vertraum	Ajazz	Filippa Gojo	2015
NRW8016	Favo 3	Ajazz	Volker Schlott, Falk Breitkreuz, Sander de Winne	2017

== See also ==
- List of record labels
- NWR Records (Netherlands)
