= Woluwe-Saint-Pierre =

Municipality of the Brussels-Capital Region, Belgium

Woluwe-Saint-Pierre: Woluwe-Saint-Pierre (French); Sint-Pieters-Woluwe (Dutch)
- Municipality
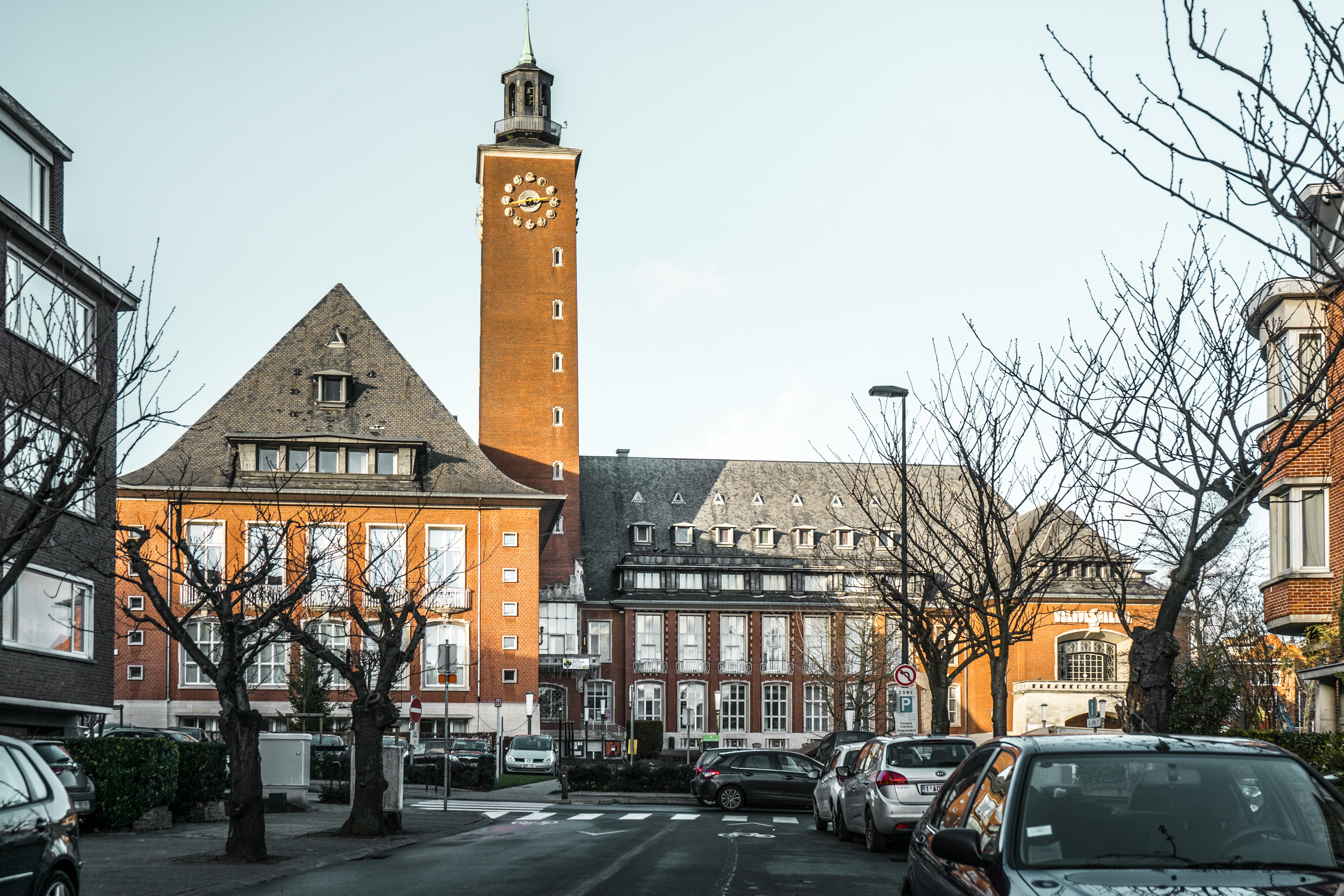
- Woluwe Saint-Pierre's Municipal Hall

- Flag Coat of arms

- Woluwe-Saint-Pierre municipality in the Brussels-Capital Region
- Interactive map of Woluwe-Saint-Pierre
- Location in Belgium
- Coordinates: 50°50′N 04°28′E
- Country: Belgium
- Community: Flemish Community; French Community
- Region: Brussels-Capital
- Arrondissement: Brussels-Capital

Government
  - Mayor: Benoît Cerexhe (LB)
  - Governing parties: LB, Ecolo-Groen, DéFI

Area
  - Total: 8.94 km^{2} (3.45 sq mi)

Population (2020-01-01)
  - Total: 42,119
  - Density: 4,710/km^{2} (12,200/sq mi)
- Postal codes: 1150
- NIS code: 21019
- Area codes: 02
- Website: www.woluwe1150.be

Woluwe-Saint-Pierre (French, pronounced [wolywe sɛ̃ pjɛʁ]) (Note: In French, it is sometimes spelt Woluwé-Saint-Pierre (with an acute accent on the first e) to reflect the Frenchified pronunciation of what was originally a Dutch place name, but the official spelling is without an accent.) or Sint-Pieters-Woluwe (Dutch, pronounced [sɪnt ˈpitərs ˈʋoːlyu.ə]) is one of the 19 municipalities of the Brussels-Capital Region, Belgium. Located in the eastern part of the region, it is bordered by Etterbeek, Auderghem and Woluwe-Saint-Lambert, as well as the Flemish municipalities of Kraainem and Tervuren. Like all municipalities in Brussels, it is officially bilingual (French–Dutch). The Woluwe stream, from which it takes its name, flows through the municipality.

As of 1 January 2022, the municipality had a population of 42,216 inhabitants. The total area is 8.94 km^{2} (3.45 sq mi), which gives a population density of 4,722/km^{2} (12,230/sq mi). It is mostly a well-to-do residential area, which includes the wide, park-lined, Avenue de Tervueren/Tervurenlaan, and the numerous embassies located near the Square Maréchal Montgomery/Maarschalk Montgomeryplein.

== History ==
=== Middle Ages to 17th century ===
The first appearance of the name Wolewe dates from 1117 and can be found in a charter from Forest. At that time, the original hamlet and its farms were dependencies of Park Abbey near Leuven. The onset of difficulties can be traced to the middle of the 16th century, with the hostilities waged by King Philip II of Spain against the heretical Protestants and the ensuing poverty and famine took their toll on the entire population. Safety and prosperity returned under the reigns of Archdukes Albert VII and Isabella at the beginning of the 17th century. The first grand alley linking Tervuren to Brussels, then known as the "Street of the Duke", dates from that period.

=== 18th century until today ===
The French Revolution was also a troubled period for Woluwe-Saint-Pierre. The roads became insecure, the religious freedoms were drastically curtailed, much of the local wild life was exterminated for food, and the lack of coal and wood forced people to use peat for heating. The local administration gained its independence from Brussels, obtained its first mayor on 26 May and its first municipal council in 1819. The commercial opportunities that opened up to the new municipality marked the start of a new era of wealth. The municipality did not expand very quickly, however, until the last two decades of the 19th century. New roads, such as the Avenue de Tervueren/Tervurenlaan; a new train track; imposing mansions, such as the Stoclet Palace; and Woluwe Park, were all built or designed between 1880 and 1910. An important race track, now demolished, was built in 1906. The residential areas came into being right after the First World War and further urbanisation took place after the Second World War.

Nowadays, agriculture and fisheries, common before 1918, have completely disappeared. The area's economy now depends almost entirely on the service sector. Of the three streams that once crossed the municipality, only the Woluwe, a tributary of the Senne, can still largely be seen today.

== Sights ==
- The imposing modern Municipal Hall is open to visitors.
- The Church of St. Peter was erected in 1755 on the site of a much older building and perpendicular to it, with funds from Forest Abbey. Traces of the older building can still be seen on the left of the current church.
- Several turn-of-the-century houses and manors can still be seen today, such as the Stoclet Palace, which was built between 1905 and 1909 to a design by the Viennese architect Josef Hoffmann for the Belgian financier Adolphe Stoclet, and contains mosaic friezes by Gustav Klimt.
- The Bibliotheca Wittockiana houses one of the most prestigious bookbinding collections in the world.
- The memorial on the Avenue Jules-César/Julius Caesarlaan to the Belgian Volunteer Corps for Korea, the force sent by Belgium to aid South Korea during the Korean War (1950–1953).
- The Brussels Urban Transport Museum displays a collection of trams and buses of different ages.
- The extensive Woluwe Park includes giant sequoias, cypresses, and a variety of birds such as mute swans, gulls, and grey herons.
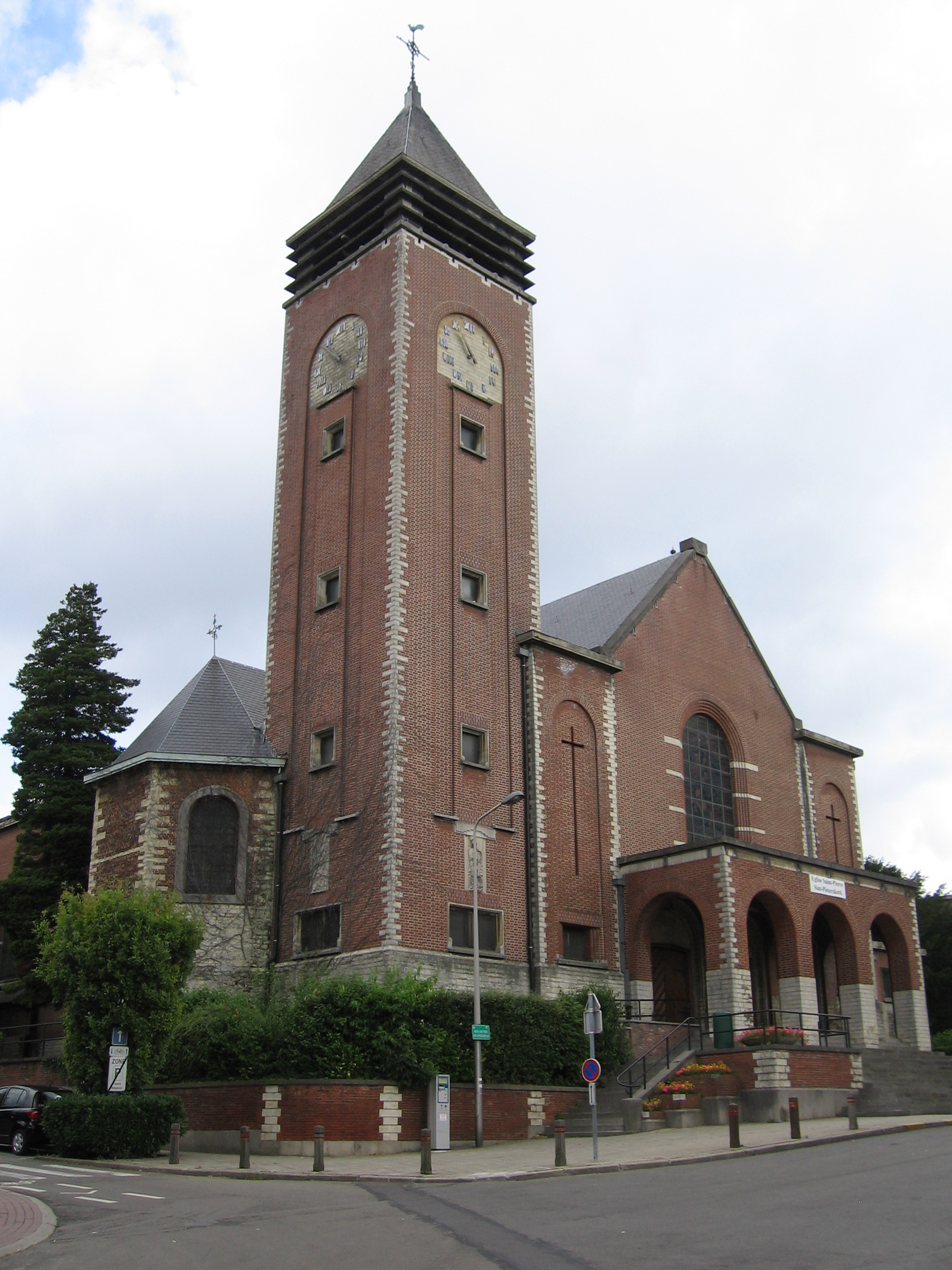
Church of St. Peter

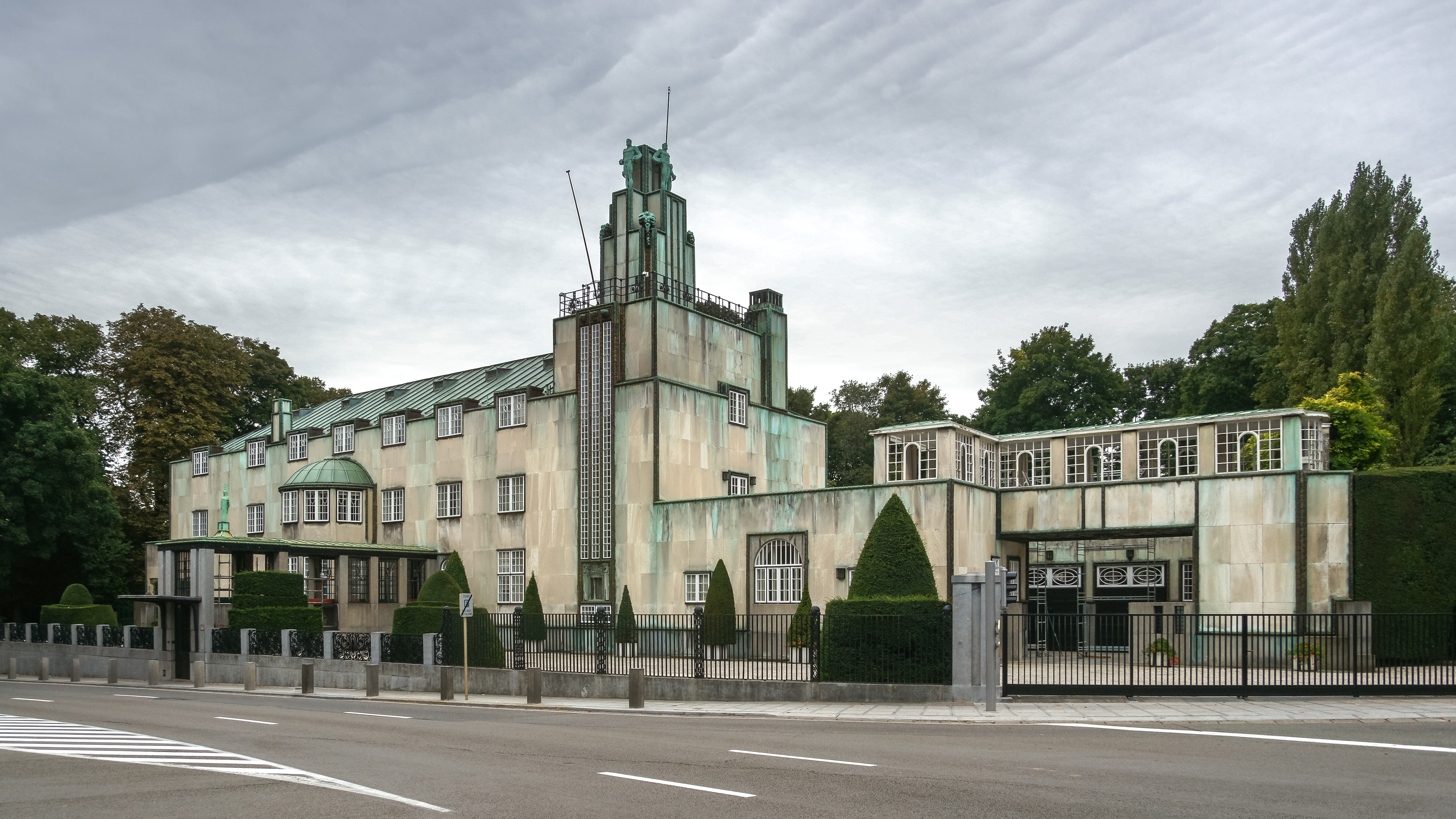
Stoclet Palace

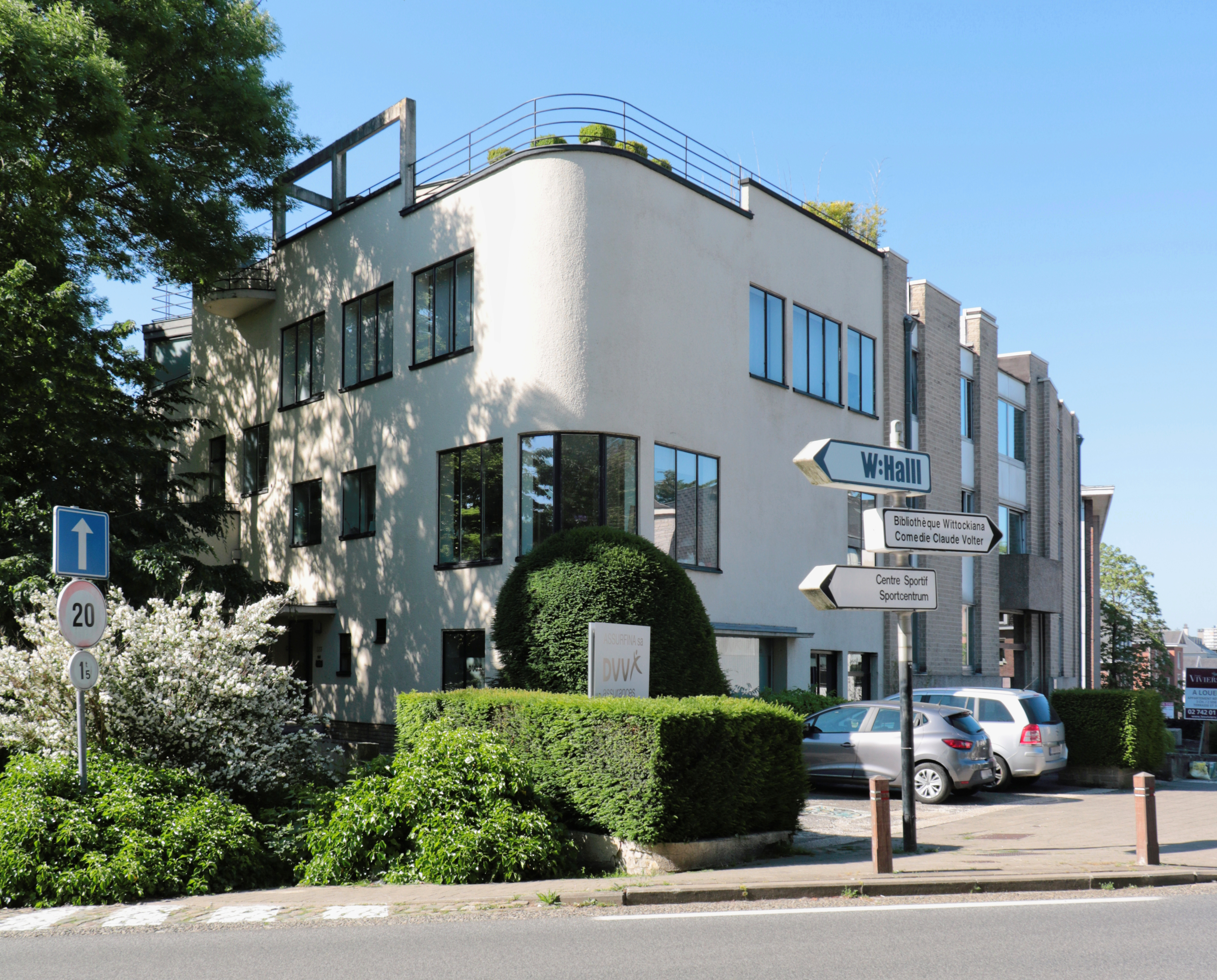
Gombert House

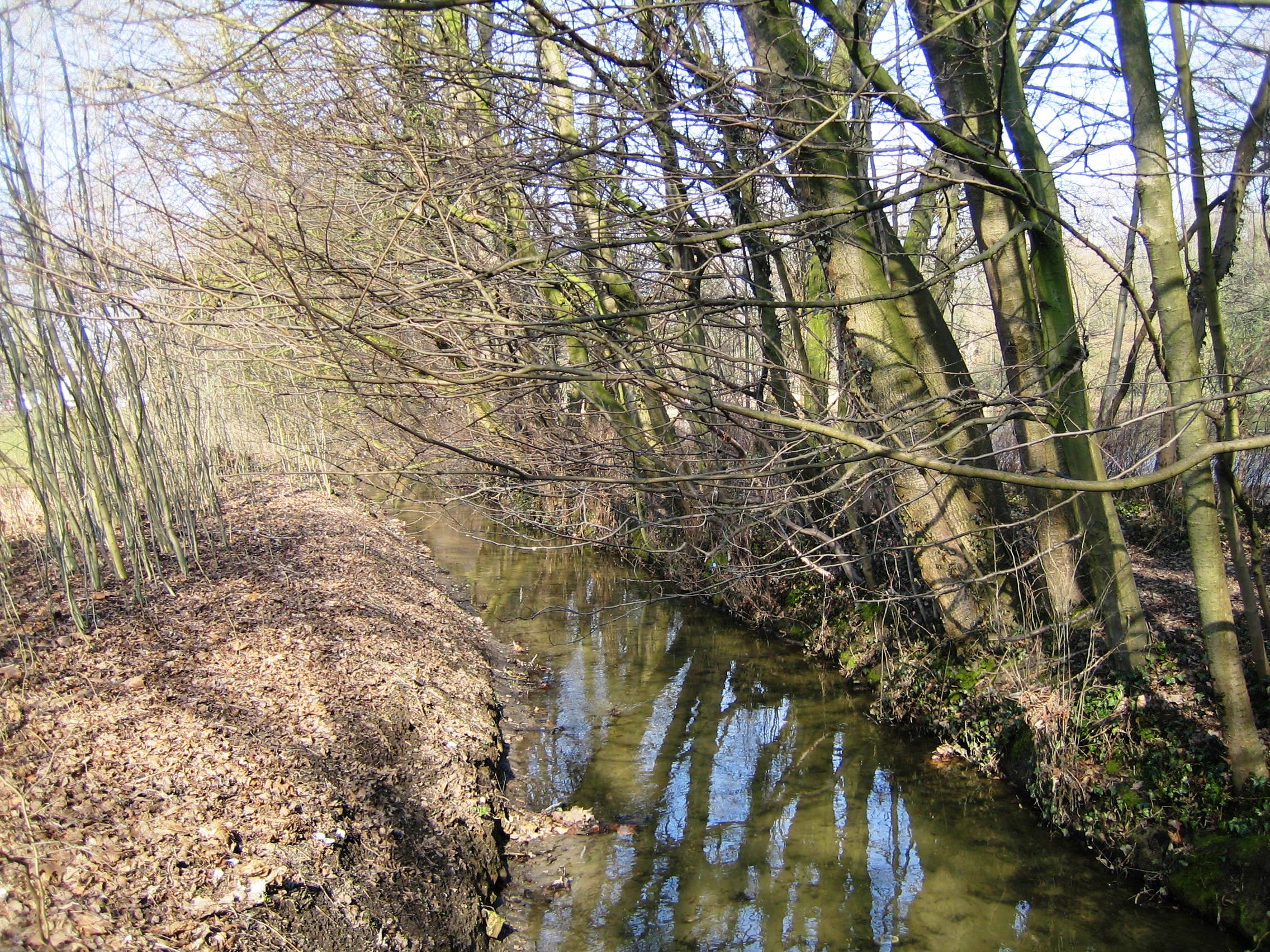
Woluwe stream

== Notable inhabitants ==
- Jean Bingen (1920–2012), papyrologist and epigrapher, died there.
- Henri d'Orléans, Count of Paris (1933–2019), pretender to the French throne
- Eddy Merckx (born 1945), professional cyclist, multiple winner of the Tour de France and Giro d'Italia in the 1960s and 1970s

== International relations ==
=== Twin towns and sister cities ===
Woluwe-Saint-Pierre is twinned with:

- Ruyumba, Rwanda (1970)
- Gangnam-gu, Seoul, South Korea (1976)
- New Iberia, Louisiana, United States (1979)
- Pecica, Romania (1989)
- Chaoyang, Beijing, China
- Goma, Democratic Republic of the Congo
- Saint-Raphaël, France (2025)

== See also ==
- Woluwe stream
- Woluwe-Saint-Lambert (Sint-Lambrechts-Woluwe), an adjacent municipality
- Sint-Stevens-Woluwe
