= The Tree of Life, Stoclet Frieze =

Painting by Gustav Klimt

L'Arbre de Vie, Stoclet Frieze
- The Tree of Life, Stoclet Frieze (English)
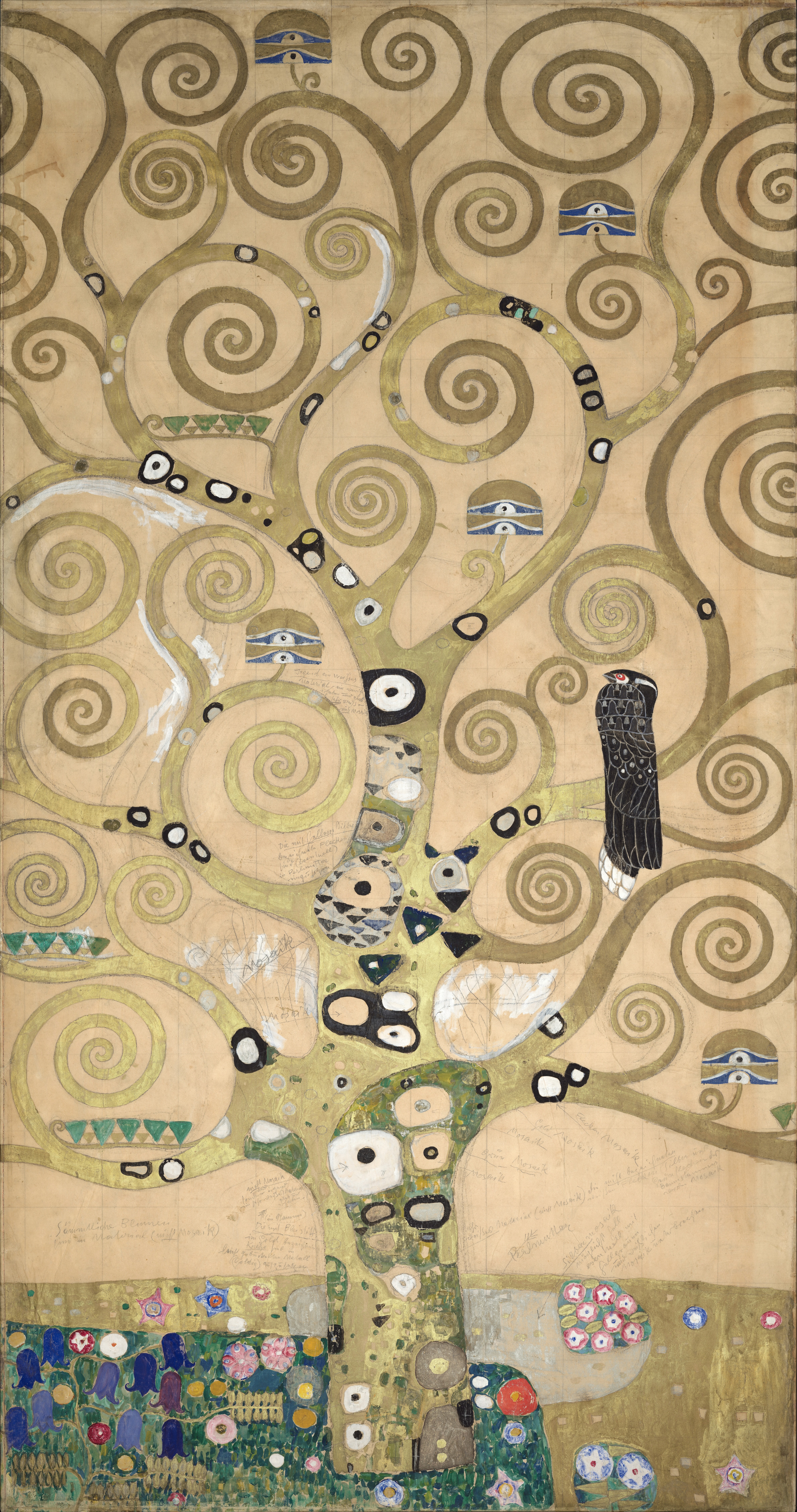
- Artist: Gustav Klimt
- Year: 1909
- Medium: Mixed media
- Dimensions: 195 cm × 102 cm (77 in × 40 in)
- Location: Museum of Applied Arts, Vienna, Austria

The Tree of Life, Stoclet Frieze (French: L'Arbre de Vie, Stoclet Frieze) is a painting by the Austrian symbolist painter Gustav Klimt. It was completed in 1909 and is based on the Art Nouveau (Modern) style in a symbolic painting genre. The dimensions of the painting are 195 by 102 centimetres (77 by 40 in), and it is housed at the Museum of Applied Arts, Vienna, Austria.

The painting is a study for a series of three mosaics created by Klimt for a 1905-1911 commissioned work at the Stoclet Palace in Brussels, Belgium. The mosaics were created in the artist's Late Works period and depict swirling Trees of Life, a standing female figure, and an embracing couple. The mosaics are spread across three walls of the Palais' dining room, along with two figural sections set opposite each other.

The iconic painting later inspired the external facade of the "New Residence Hall" (also called the "Tree House"), a colorful 21-story student residence hall at Massachusetts College of Art and Design in Boston, Massachusetts.

== See also ==
- Stoclet Frieze
- List of paintings by Gustav Klimt
