= Art Deco in Brussels =

Local implementation of a style of architecture and design

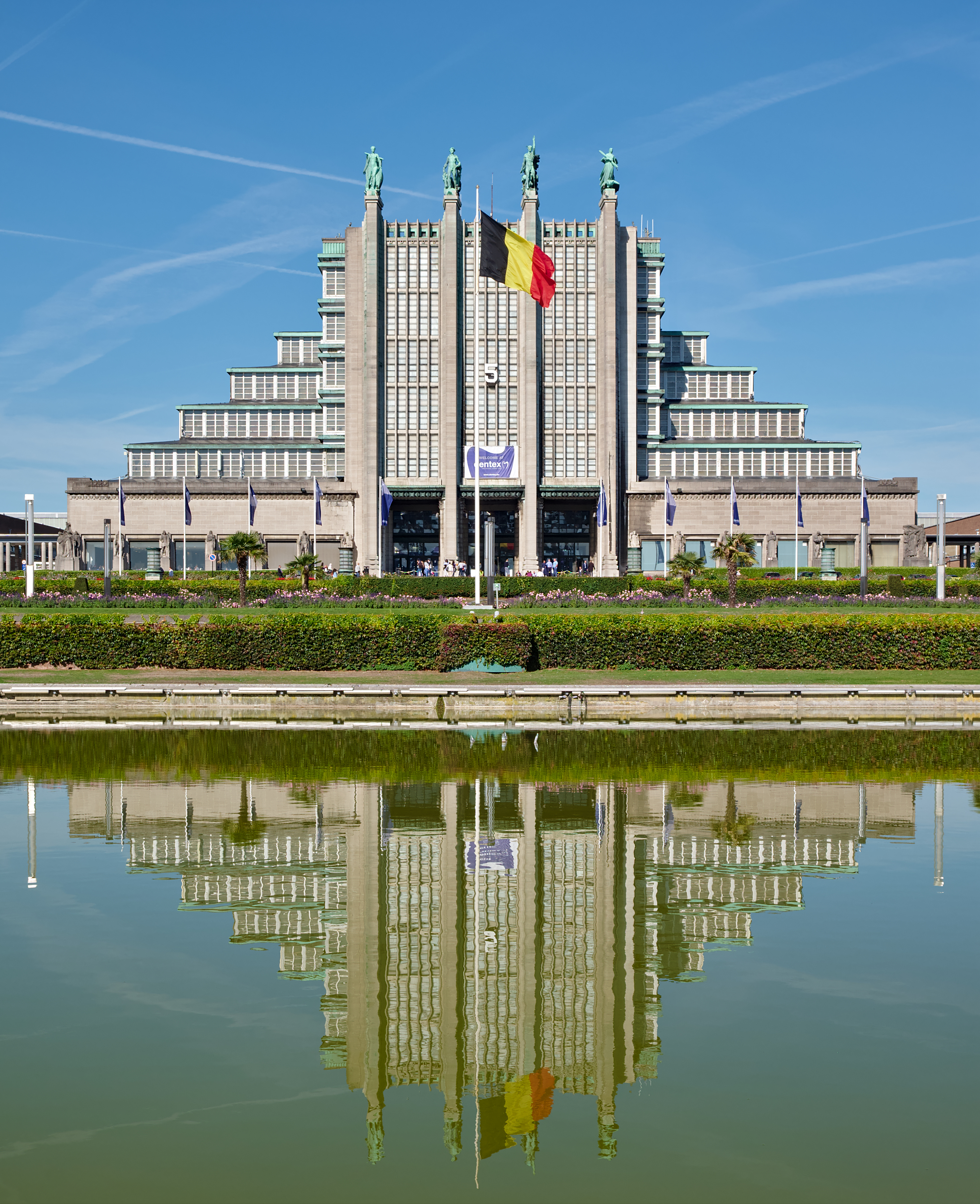
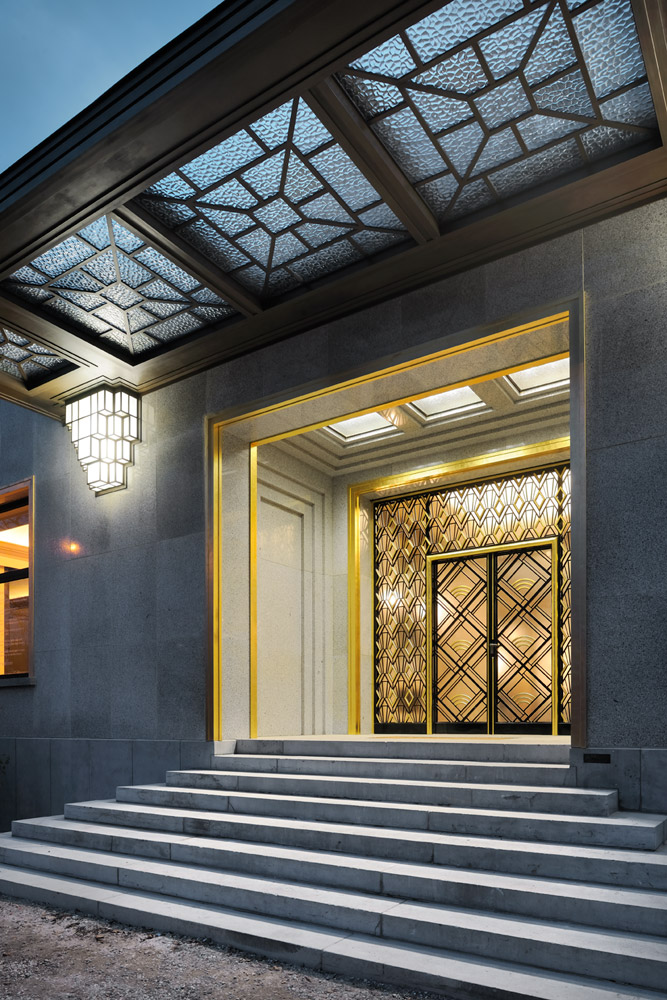
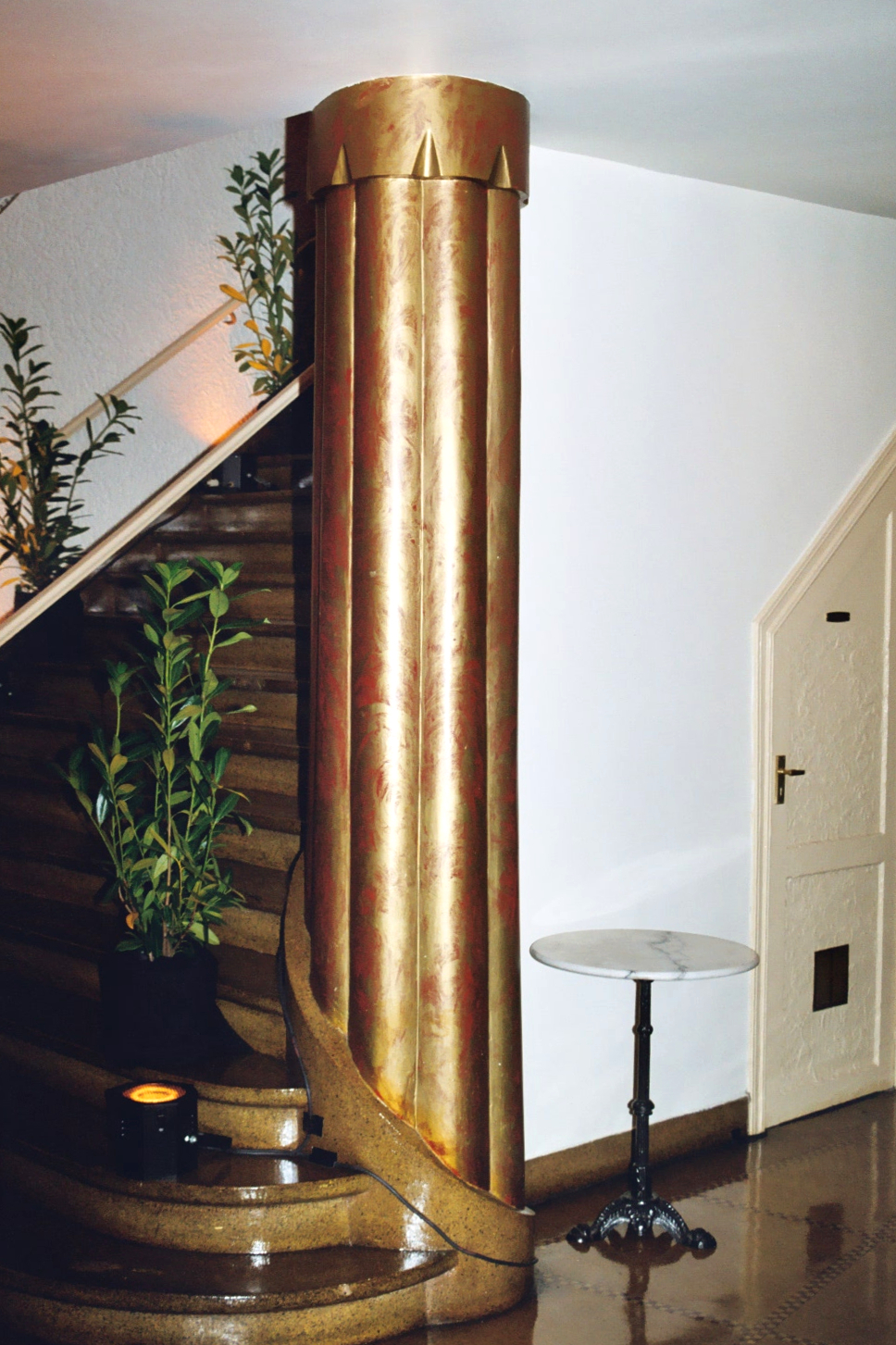
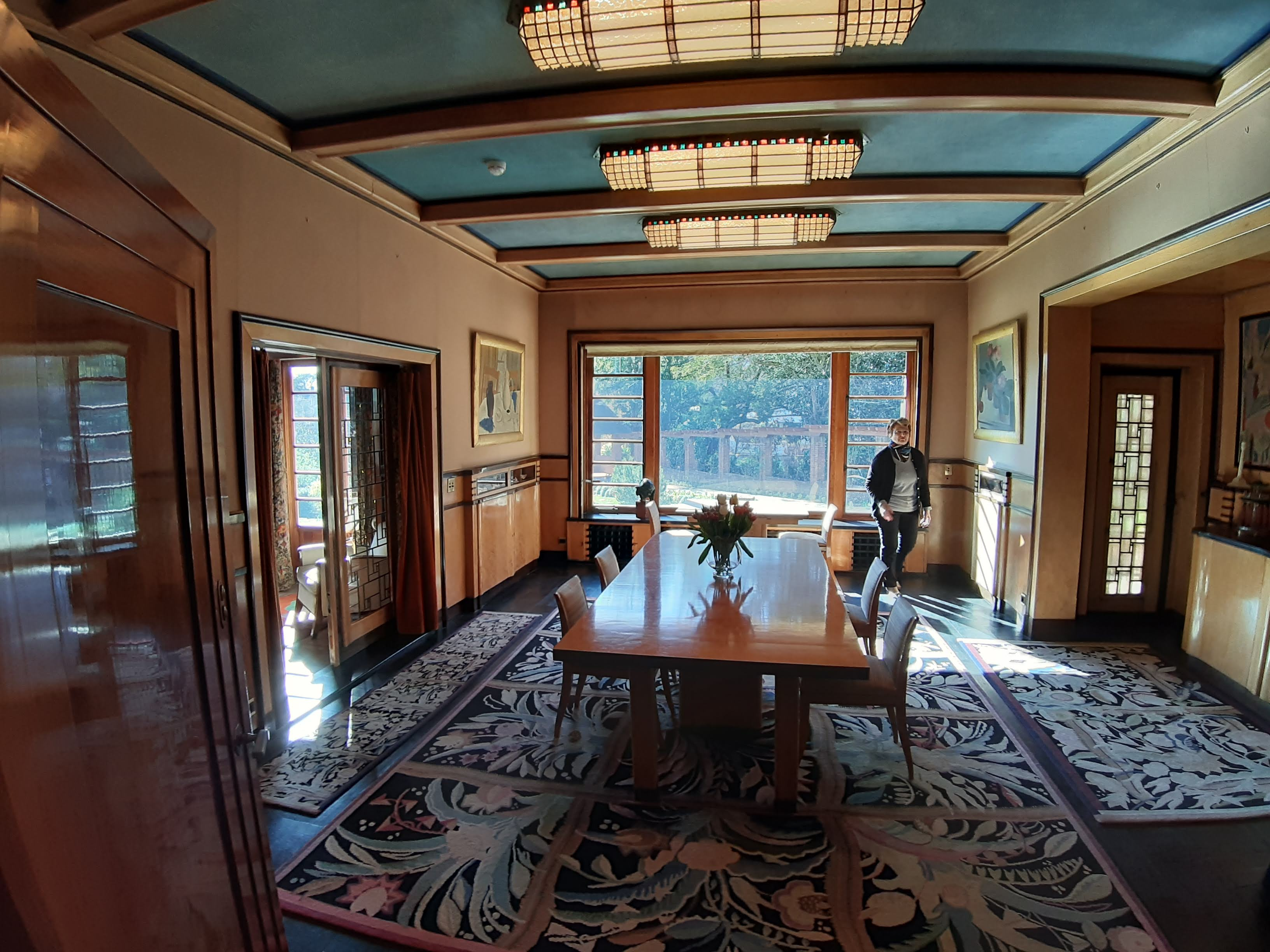
- Top: Centenary Palace (1935); Centre left: Entrance of the Villa Empain (1930–1934); Centre right: Complexe Albert Hall (1931–32); Bottom: Museum David and Alice van Buuren (1924–1928)
- Years active: c. 1919–1939
- Location: Belgium

The Art Deco movement of architecture and design appeared in Brussels, Belgium, immediately after World War I when the famed architect Victor Horta began designing the Centre for Fine Arts, and continued until the beginning of World War II in 1939. It took its name from the International Exposition of Modern Decorative and Industrial Arts held in Paris in 1925. At the end of World War II, Art Deco in Brussels faded to make way for the modernist and international architectural styles that would mark the postwar period.

== Origins ==
Art Deco in Brussels was the result of a dual Austrian and American influence: on the one hand, the influence exerted by the Austrian-Moravian architect Josef Hoffmann and the Viennese Secession, via the Stoclet Palace in the Woluwe-Saint-Pierre municipality, on certain Brussels' architects following geometric Art Nouveau (such as Léon Sneyers, Jean-Baptiste Dewin and Camille Damman), as well as on the new generation of post-World War I architects; on the other, the influence exerted by the American architect Frank Lloyd Wright on Victor Horta who visited his works (like the Unity Temple in Oak Park) during the two years he spent in exile in the United States during the war, from 1916 to 1918.

=== Josef Hoffmann and the Stoclet Palace (1905–1911) ===
The architects of the Vienna Secession (formed in 1897), especially Josef Hoffmann, had a notable influence on Art Deco and early modernism in Brussels. His Stoclet Palace (1905–1911) on the Avenue de Tervueren/Tervurenlaan in Woluwe-Saint-Pierre, was a prototype of the Art Deco style, featuring geometric volumes, symmetry, straight lines, concrete covered with marble plaques, finely-sculpted ornament, and lavish interiors, including mosaic friezes by Gustav Klimt. The house was declared a UNESCO World Heritage Site in 2009.

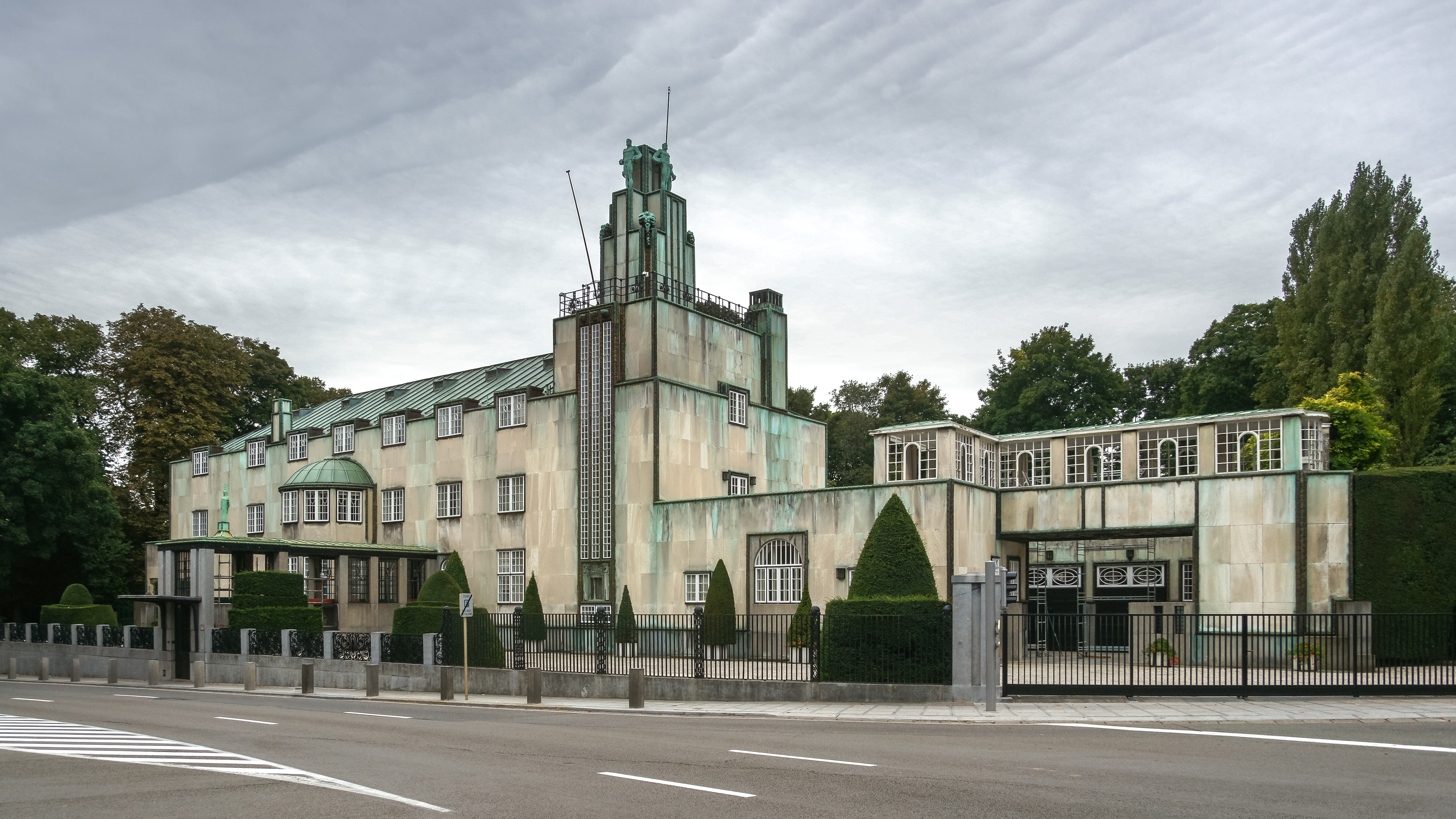
Stoclet Palace by Josef Hoffmann (1905–1911)

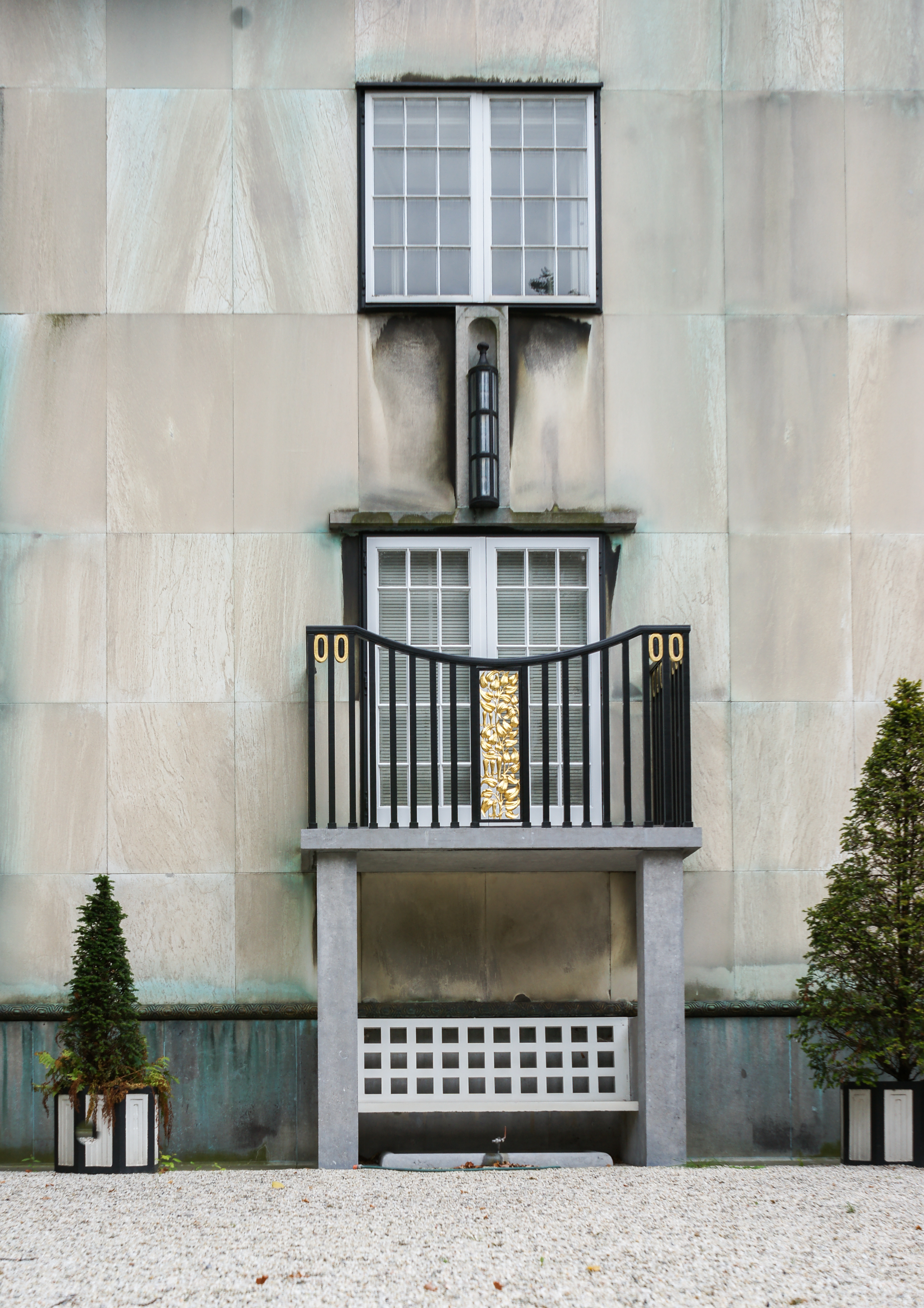
Windows of the Stoclet Palace

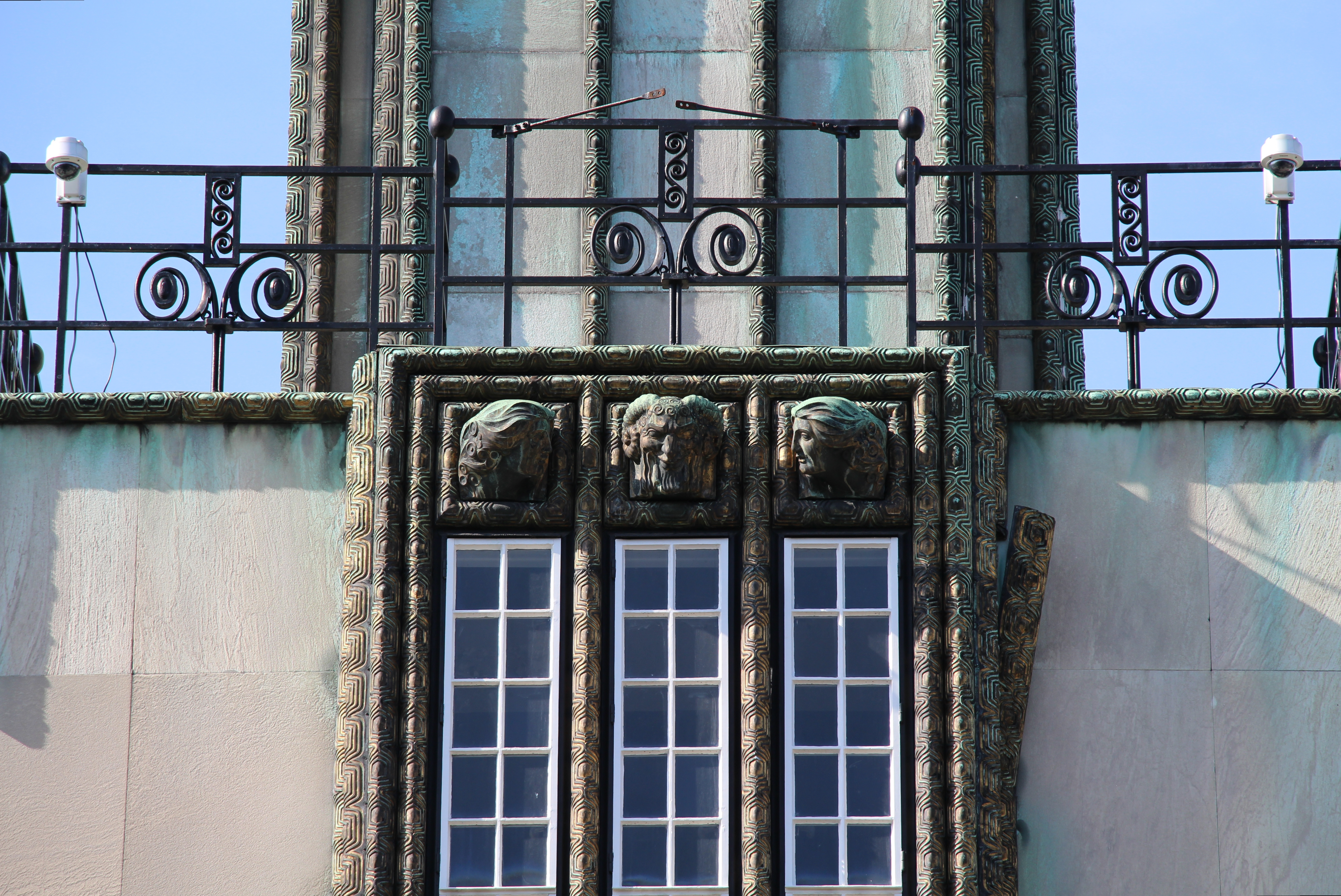
Detail of the façade, made of reinforced concrete covered with marble plaques

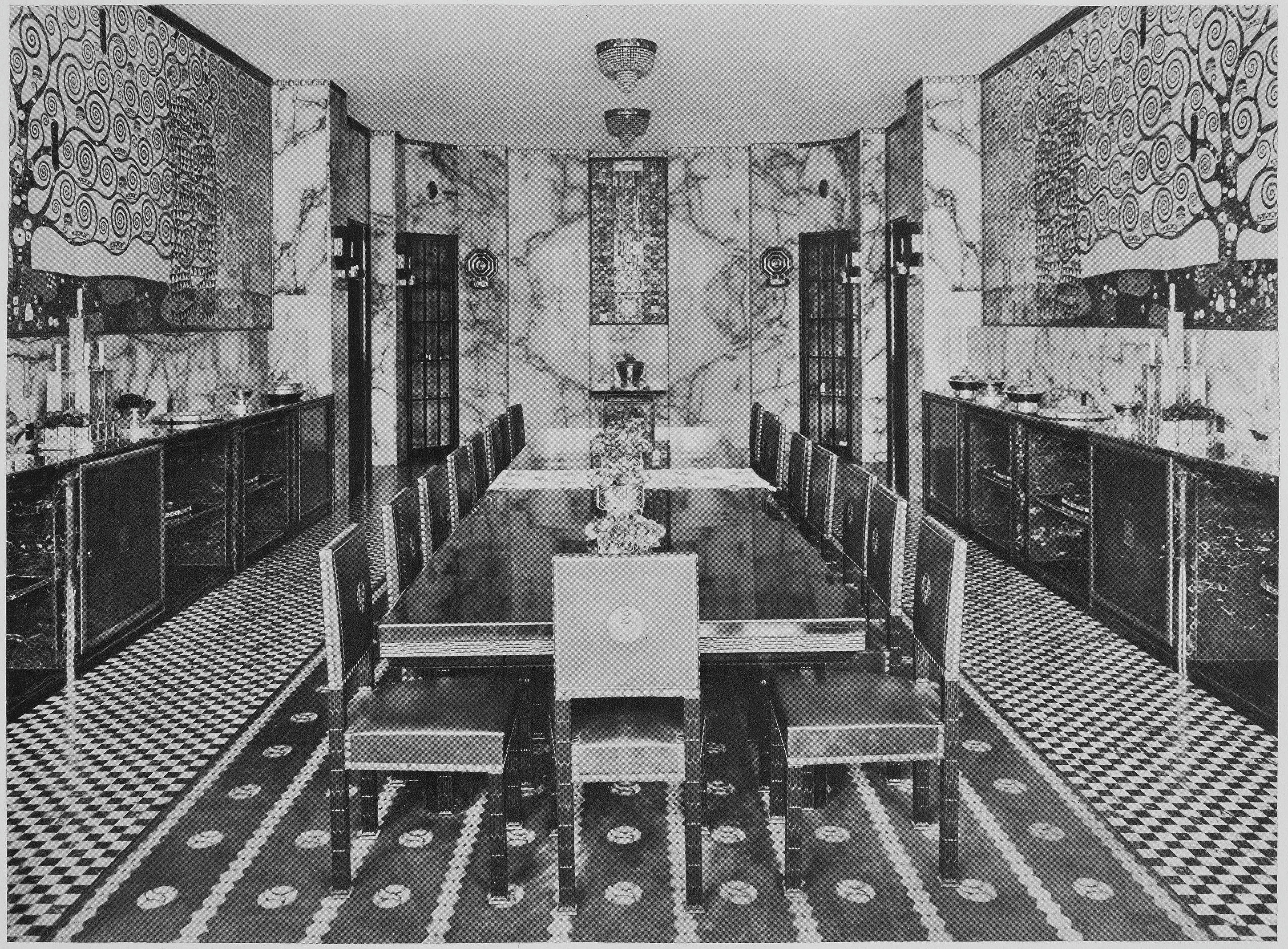
Photograph of the Stoclet Palace's dining room, with furniture by Hoffmann and mosaic frieze by Gustav Klimt

=== Victor Horta and the Centre for Fine Arts (1923–1929) ===
The post-World War I austerity meant that Art Nouveau was no longer affordable or fashionable for Brussels' upper middle class. On his return to Brussels in January 1919, following his exile to the United States, Victor Horta, who had gradually been simplifying his style over the previous decade, abandoned organic forms, and instead based his designs on the geometrical. He continued to use rational floor plans, and to apply the latest developments in building technology and building services engineering. Beginning in 1919, he developed the plans for the Centre for Fine Arts in central Brussels, a multi-purpose cultural centre designed in a more geometric style similar to Art Deco, with construction starting in 1923. It was completed in 1929.

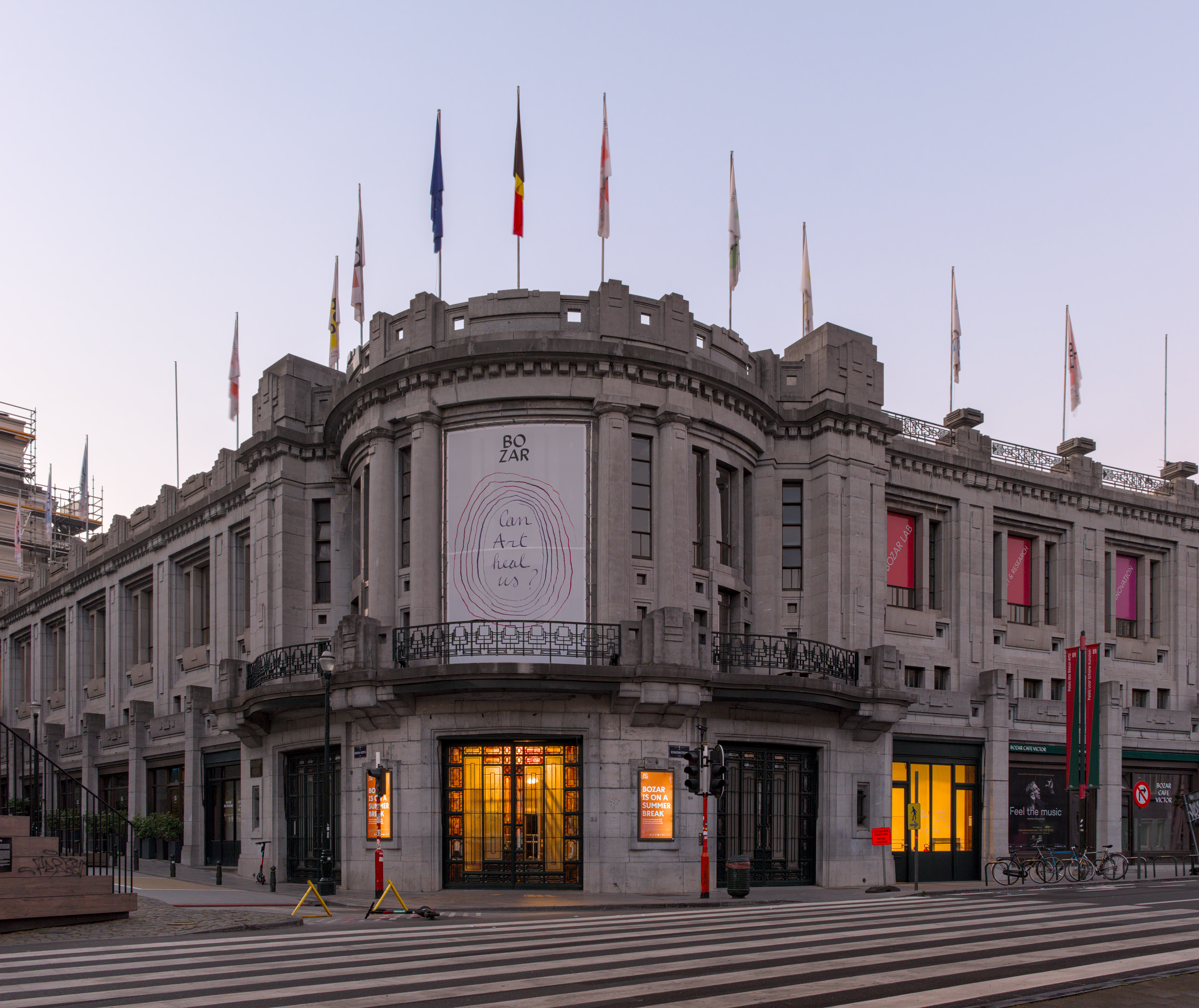
Centre for Fine Arts by Victor Horta (1923–1929)

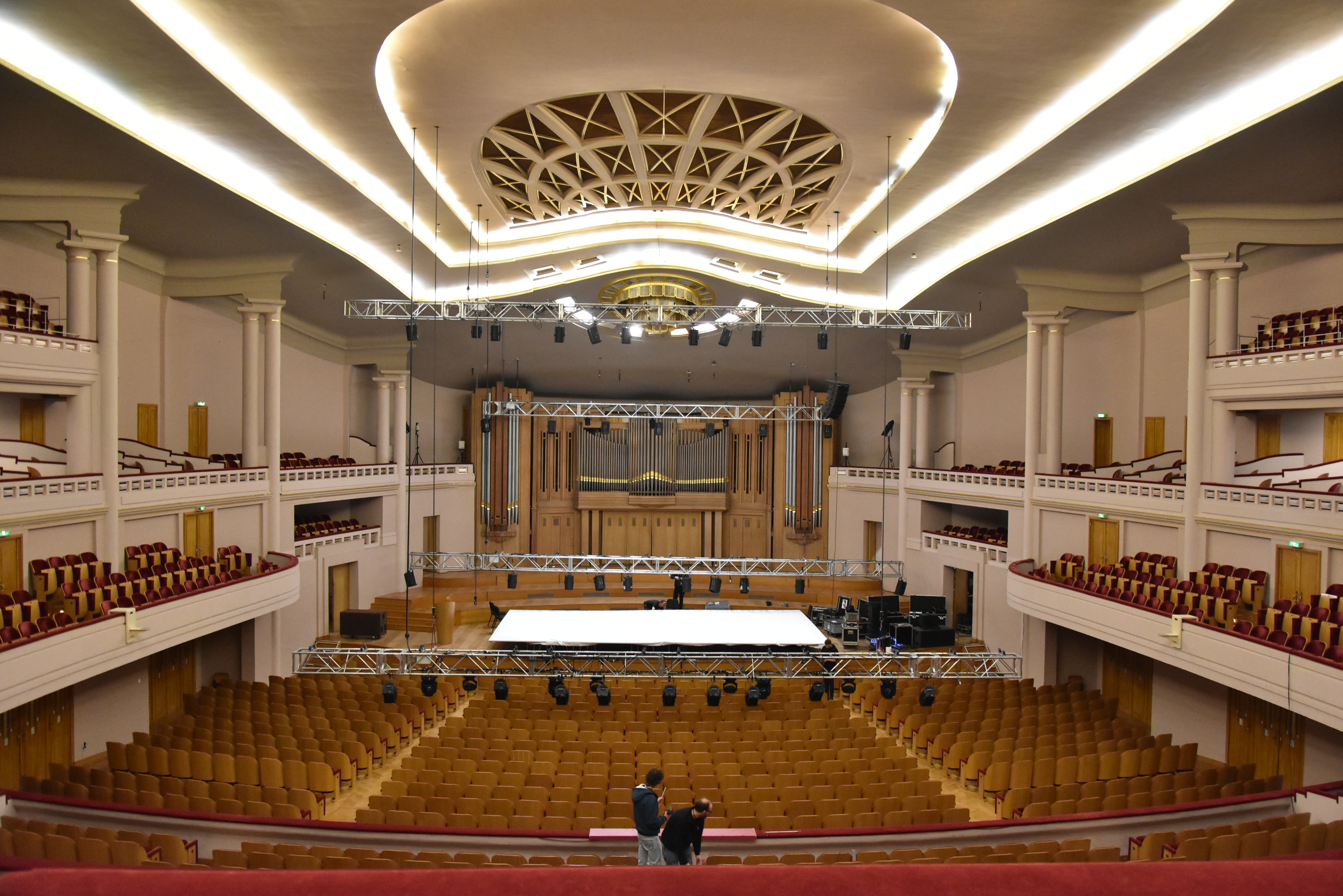
Henry Le Boeuf Hall at the Centre for Fine Arts

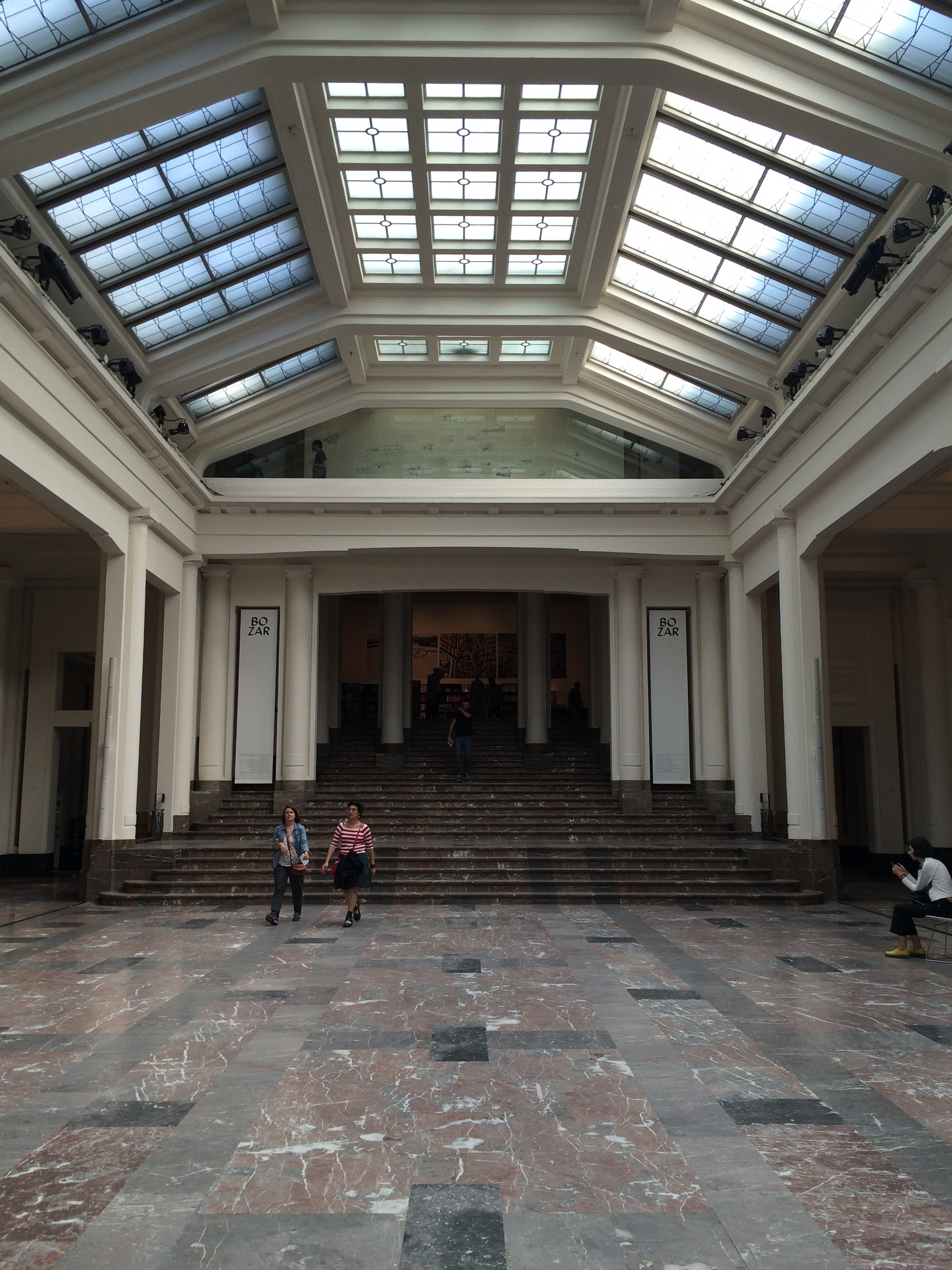
Exhibition hall of the Centre for Fine Arts

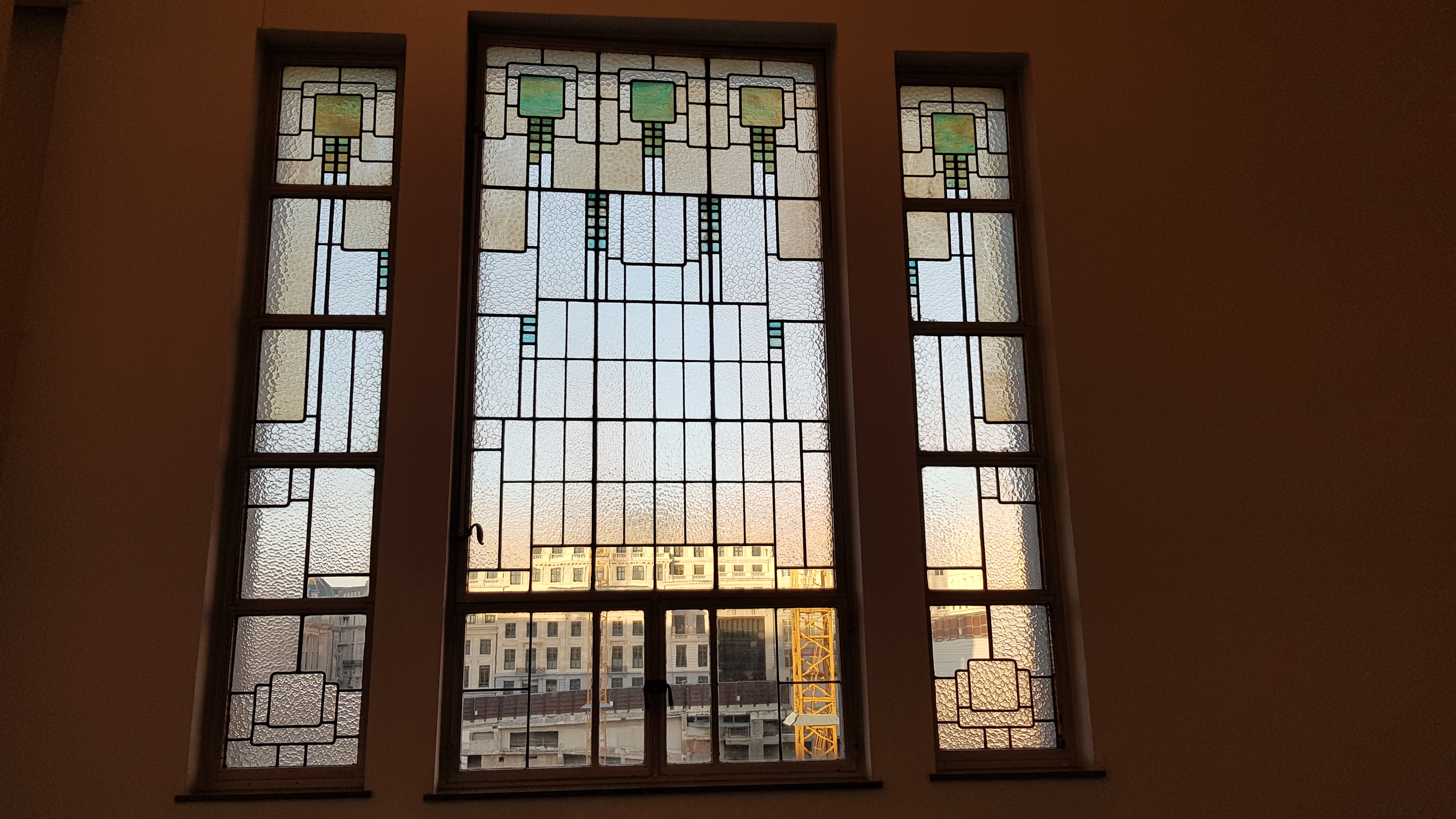
Window of the Centre for Fine Arts

== Architecture ==
Monumental Art Deco structures in Brussels include the National Basilica of the Sacred Heart (1919–1969), located at the border between the Koekelberg and Ganshoren municipalities, as well as Brussels' Central and North railway stations (both constructed as part of the North–South connection). The latter, located in Schaerbeek, has also kept its original clock tower.

- In the City of Brussels, the Centre for Fine Arts (1923–1929) is a prominent Art Deco building; and in the European Quarter so are the Résidence Palace (1927) (now part of the Europa building), as well as the former Eastman Dental Hospital (1933–1935) (now the House of European History). Bordering Brussels' historic city centre (the Pentagon) and the Northern Quarter business district (also called Little Manhattan), the Place Charles Rogier/Karel Rogierplein is home to an important Art Deco architectural heritage, including the Hotel Indigo Brussels - City (formerly the Hôtel Albert I) (1929) and the Hôtel Siru (1932).
- In Ixelles, the Résidence de la Cambre (1938–39), the first high-rise building in Brussels, on the Boulevard Général Jacques/Generaal Jacqueslaan; the Villa Empain (1930–1934) on the Avenue Franklin Roosevelt/Franklin Rooseveltlaan; and the Flagey Building, also known as the Radio House (1935–1938), on the Place Eugène Flagey/Eugène Flageyplein, are also well-known examples of this style.
- In Forest, the Municipal Hall with its tower (1935–1938) illustrates the leading role the style played in public architecture in Brussels.
- In Uccle, the Van Buuren Museum & Gardens (1924–1928) is an example of the Amsterdam School with a brick construction, art glass, and a total architectural experience including bespoke interior designs.

Some religious buildings from the interwar period were also constructed in that style, such as the Church of St. John the Baptist (1930–1932) in Molenbeek and the Church of St. Augustine (1932–1935) in Forest. Another example are the exhibition halls of the Centenary Palace, built for the 1935 World's Fair on the Heysel/Heizel Plateau in northern Brussels, and home to the Brussels Exhibition Centre (Brussels Expo).

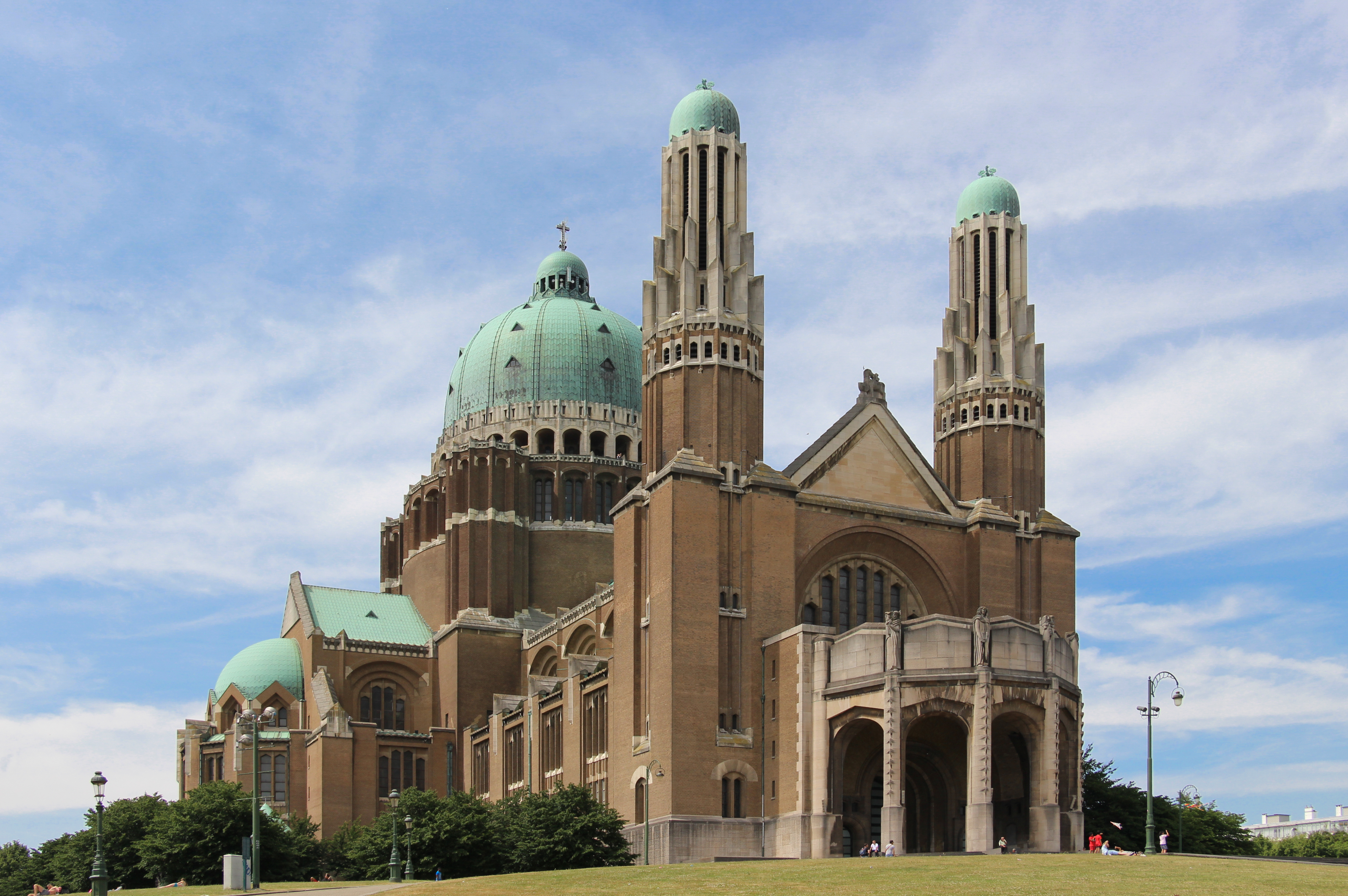
National Basilica of the Sacred Heart by Pierre Langerock, Albert Van Huffel and Paul Rome (1919–1969)

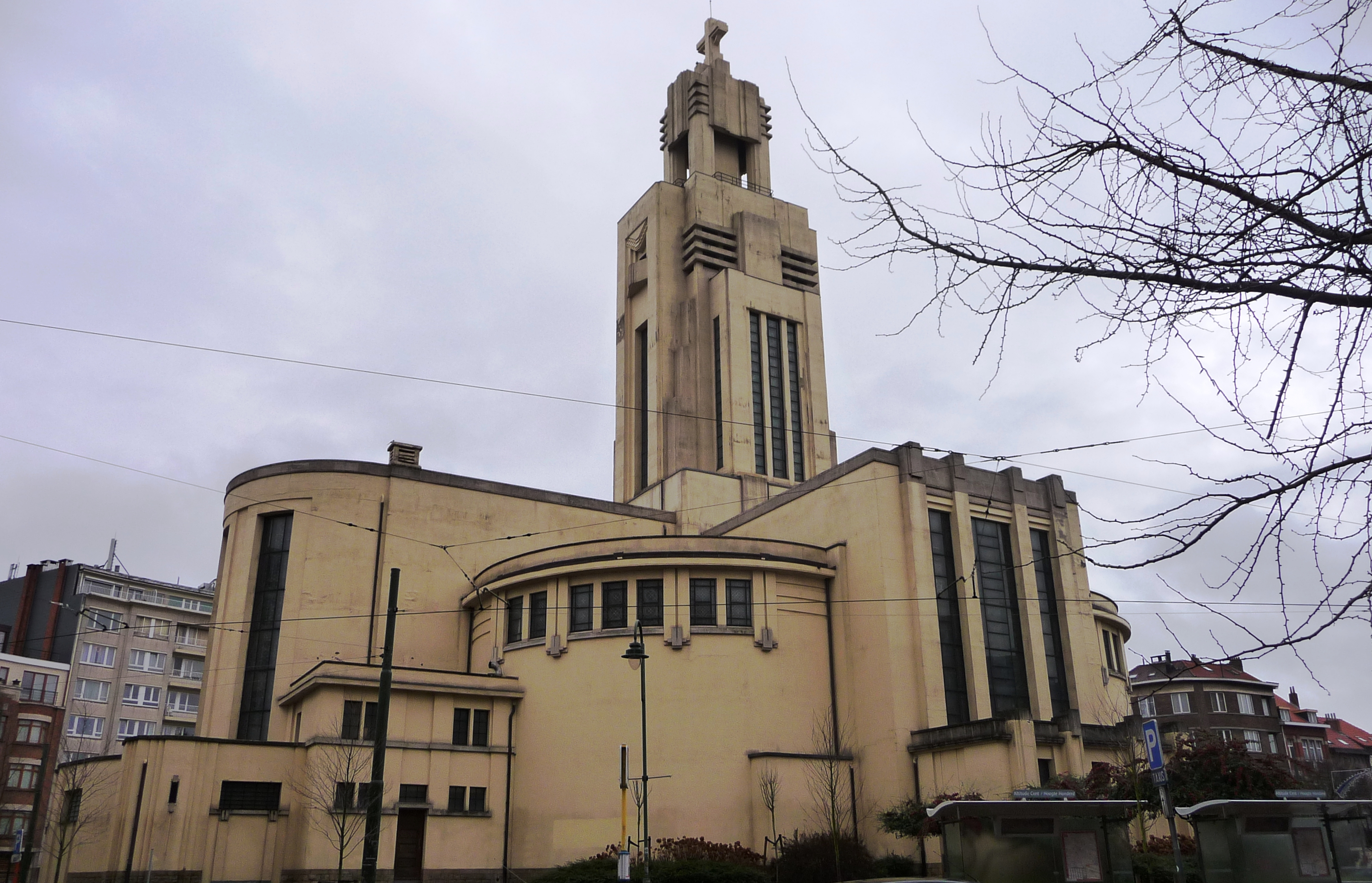
Church of St. Augustine by Léon Guiannotte and André Watteyne (1932–1935)

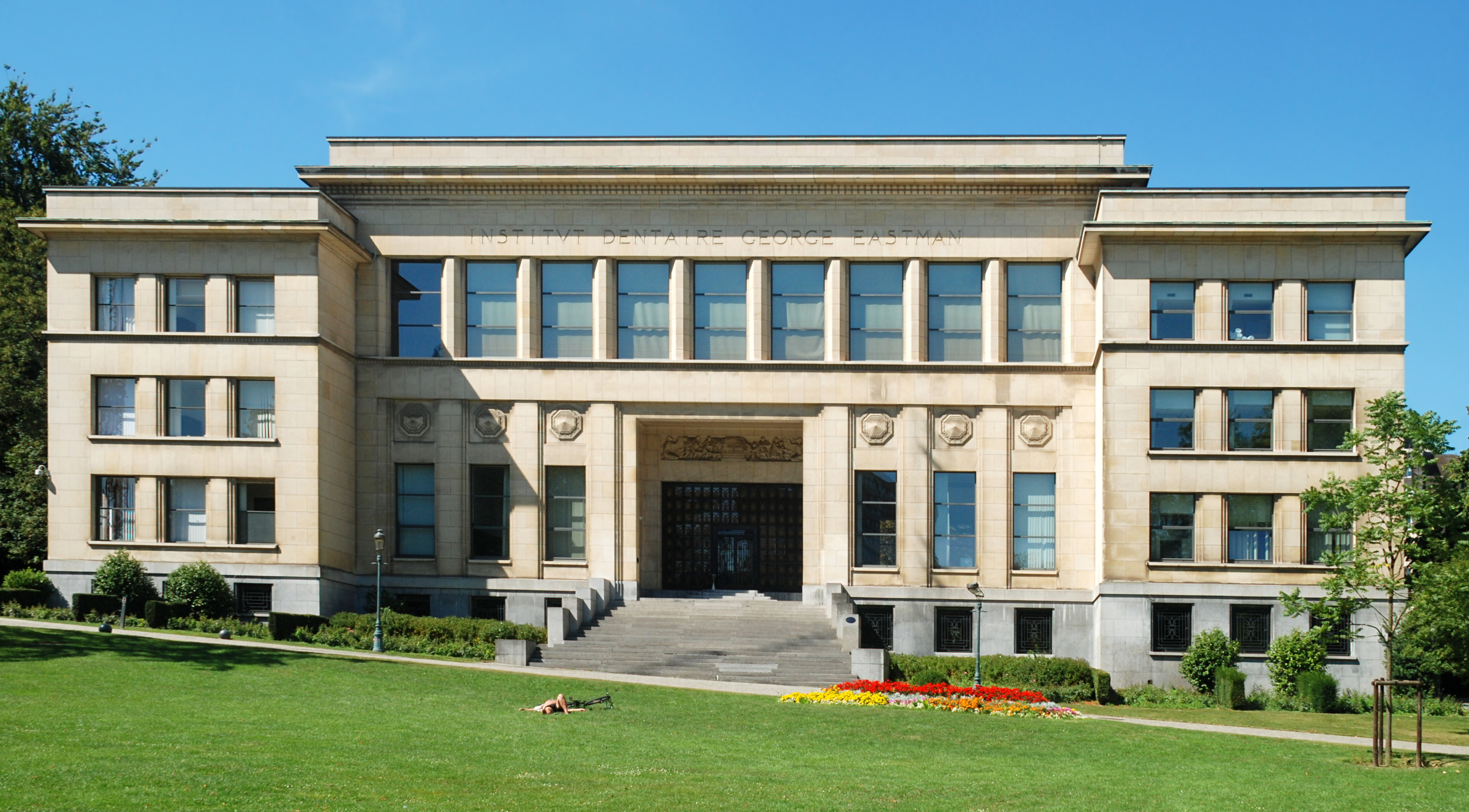
Former Eastman Dental Hospital (now the House of European History) by Michel Polak (1933–1935)

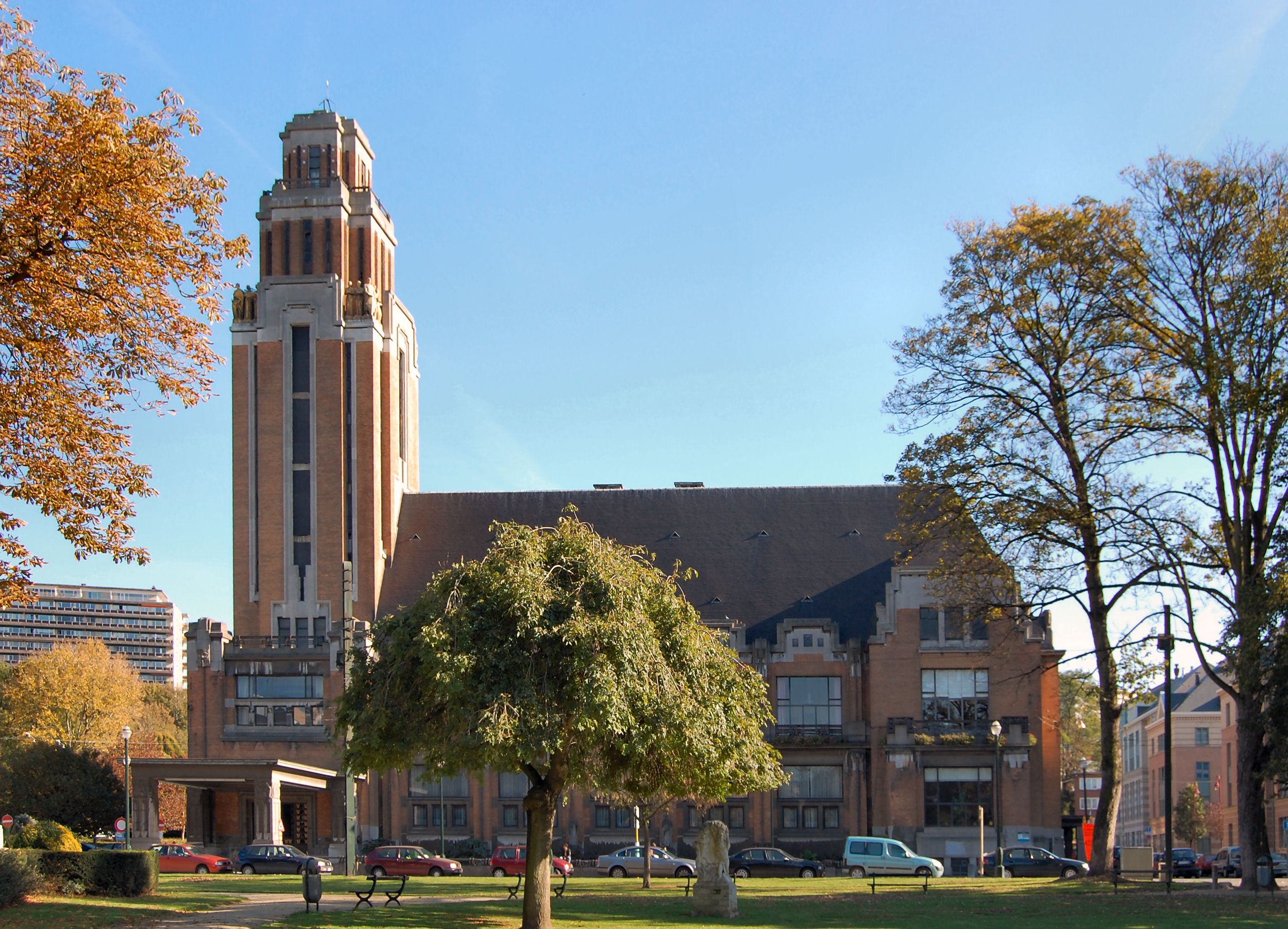
Forest's Municipal Hall by Jean-Baptiste Dewin (1935–1938)

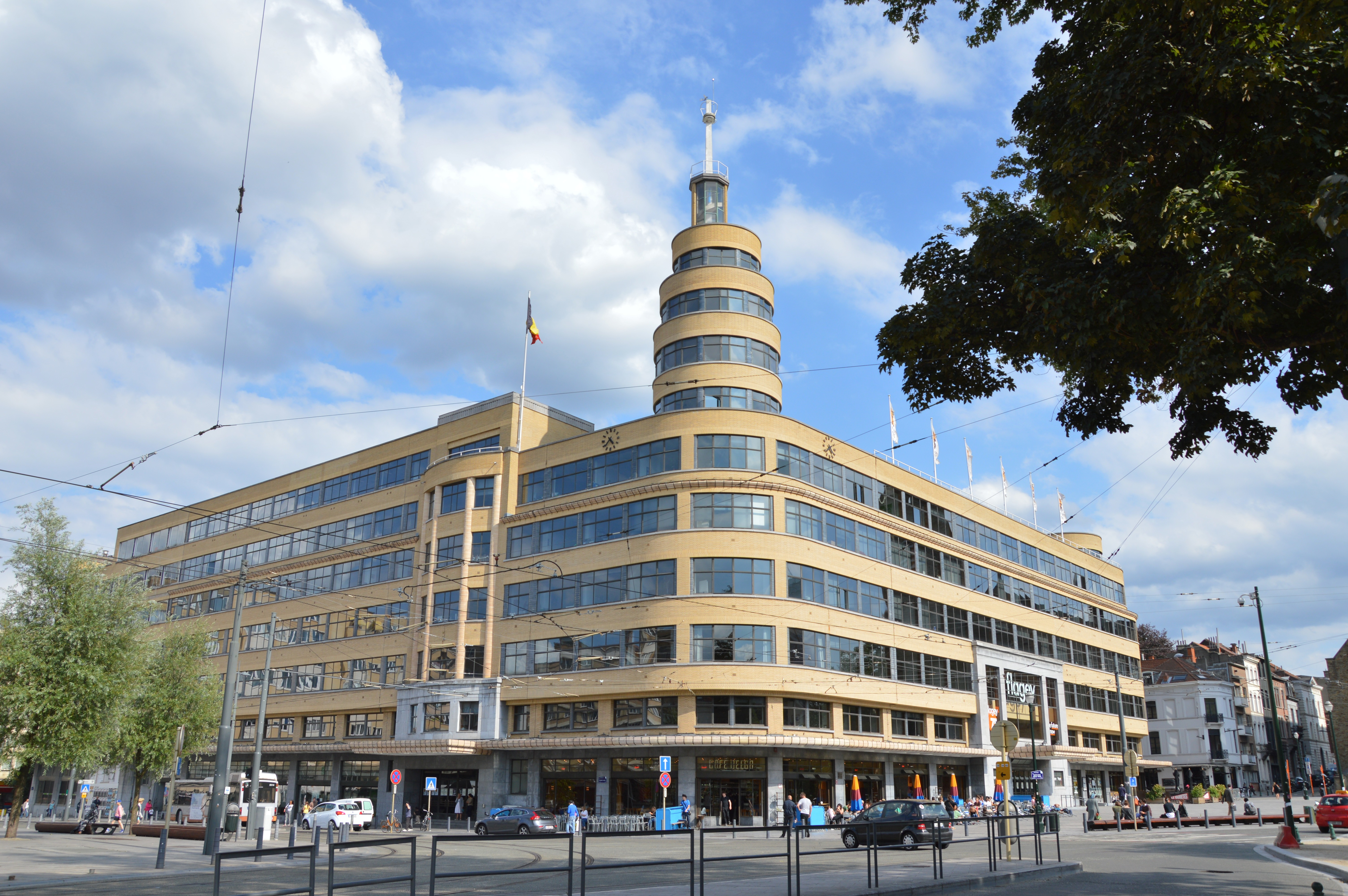
Flagey Building (or Radio House) by Joseph Diongre (1935–1938)

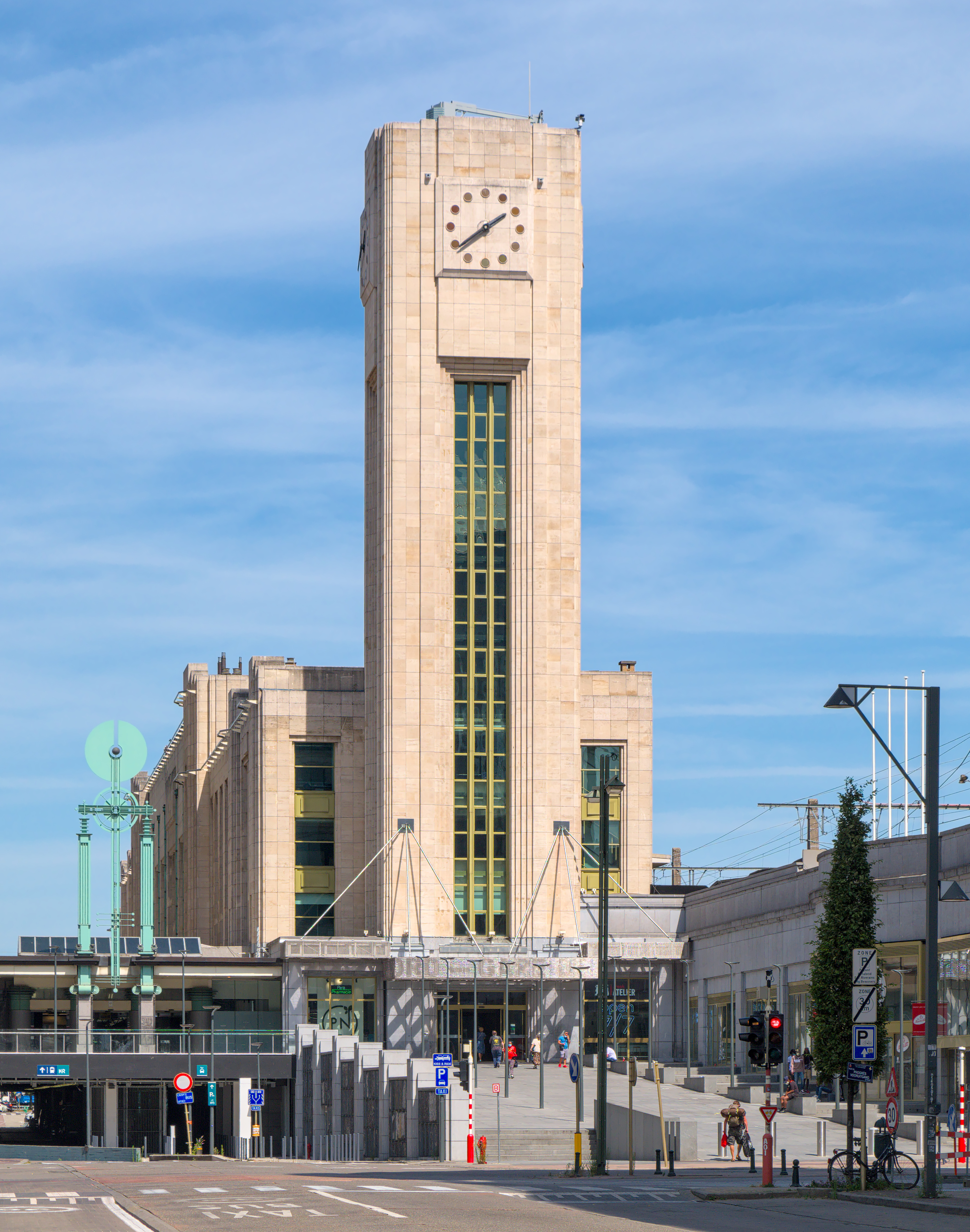
Brussels-North railway station entrance and clock tower by Paul Saintenoy (1952–1956)

== See also ==
- Art Nouveau in Brussels
- History of Brussels
- Culture of Belgium
- Belgium in the long nineteenth century
