= Adolphe Stoclet =

Belgian engineer, financier and noted collector

- Die Erwartung by Gustav Klimt, part of Stoclet Frieze
- Born: 30 September 1871; Saint-Gilles, Belgium
- Died: 3 November 1949 (aged 78); Woluwe-Saint-Pierre
- Known for: Stoclet Palace

Adolphe Stoclet (French pronunciation: [adɔlf stɔklɛ]; 30 September 1871 – 3 November 1949) was a Belgian engineer, financier and noted collector. He is primarily known for commissioning the Stoclet Palace, a mansion in Brussels, Belgium, between 1907 and 1911.

== Life ==
Stoclet was born into a family of Belgian bankers in Saint-Gilles, Belgium, on 30 September 1871. After studying civil engineering at the Free University of Brussels, he was employed by Italian and Austrian railway companies from 1894 onwards. He returned to Belgium in 1904 and began working for the Compagnie Internationale de Chemins de Fer, becoming chairman in 1927.

His wife, Suzanne, was a niece of the painter Alfred Stevens, and daughter of the art historian Arthur Stevens. They had two sons, René (b. 1902) and Jacques (b. 1903), and one daughter, Raymonde (b. 1897). Stoclet was described by contemporaries as charming, but somewhat pompous, and had a large beard said to resemble that of the Assyrian king Ashurbanipal.

After his father's death, Stoclet became one of the directors of the Société Générale de Belgique, which for many years was one of the largest holding companies in Belgium and owned about forty different enterprises, including banks, arms factories, and mines in the Belgian Congo. Banque d'Outremer, an affiliate of the Société Générale de Belgique, had its office on the Rue Brederode/Brederodestraat. Stoclet had his own office there refurbished by the architect Josef Hoffmann, one of the masters of the Vienna Secession (and later, the Wiener Werkstätte).

Stoclet met Hoffmann while in Vienna to oversee the construction of a railroad. Stoclet shared Hoffmann's avant-garde artistic inclinations, and commissioned the latter to build him his own mansion. While Stoclet initially considered building the house in Vienna, eventually he settled on a site in Brussels. The architect received not only artistic license for the design, but also an unlimited budget. Hoffmann left much of the interior decoration of the Stoclet Palace to the painters Gustav Klimt and Fernand Khnopff. Madame Stoclet apparently coordinated the colors of the flowers in the vases with the ties Stoclet wore.

The Stoclet Palace is situated 279–281, avenue de Tervueren/Tervurenlaan, in the Woluwe-Saint-Pierre municipality of Brussels. Stoclet resided there until his death on 3 November 1949. His wife died a fortnight later, and their art collection was divided between their three children. The Stoclet Palace is still owned by family, albeit uninhabited since the death of Anny Stoclet in 2002.
