= Leopold Forstner =

Austrian artist (1878–1936)

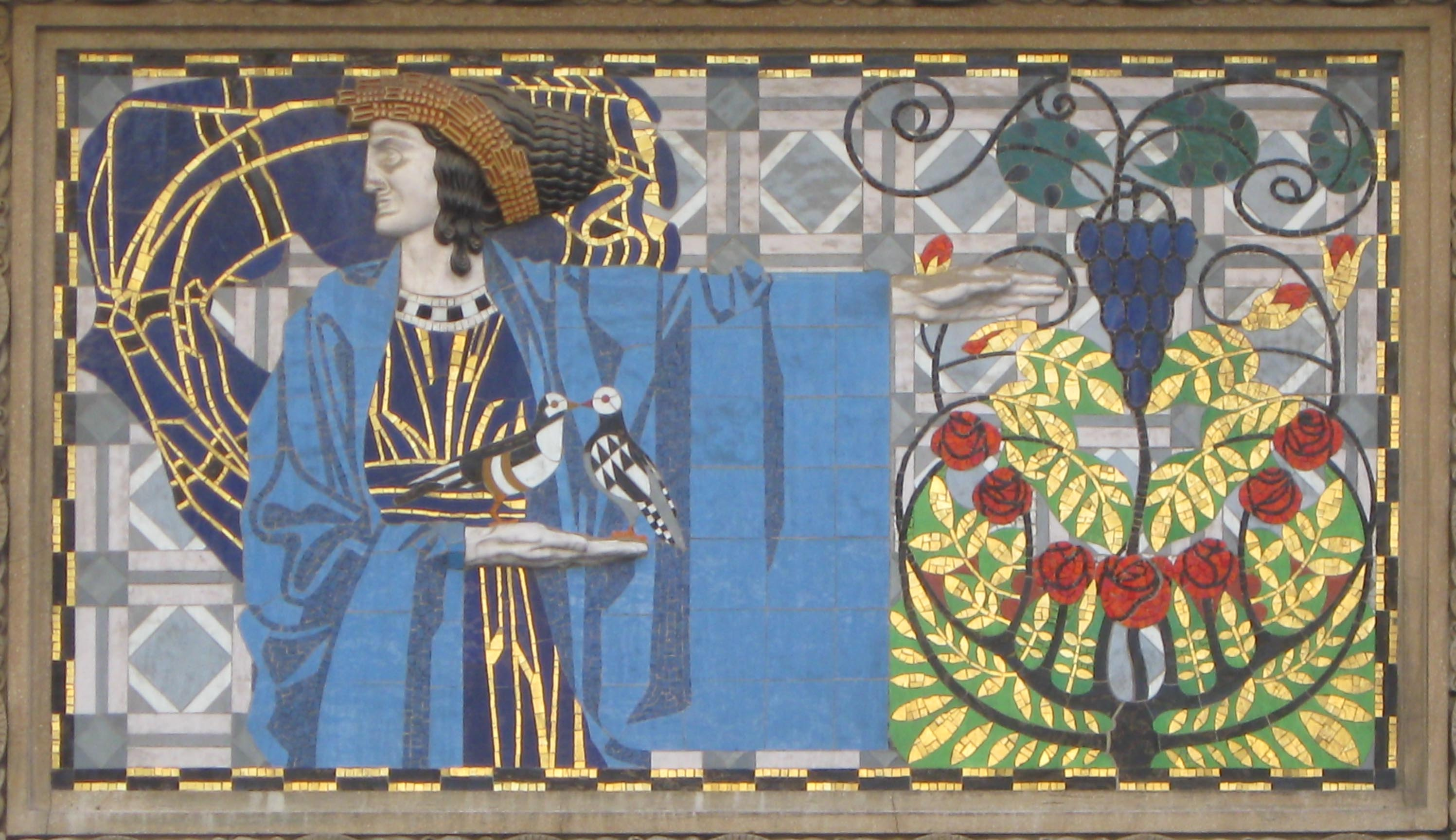
Mosaic over the entrance to Frankenberggasse 3, in Vienna

Leopold Forstner (2 November 1878 in Bad Leonfelden, Upper Austria – 5 November 1936 in Stockerau) was an artist who was part of the Viennese Secession movement, working in the Jugendstil style, focusing particularly on the mosaic as a form.

== Biography ==
Forstner was the only son of Franz Forstner, a carpenter, and his wife Anna. He completed his primary education in Leonfelden, before completing his education in Linz. Through his uncle Anton Forstner he was able to be released from an apprenticeship in glass painting and mosaic installation in Innsbruck and instead studied at the University of Applied Arts in Vienna. There, he studied under Karl Karger and Koloman Moser. Moser would go on to mentor Forstner. After the end of his studies in Vienna, Forstner would go on to study at the Academy of Fine Arts in Munich, under Ludwig von Herterich.

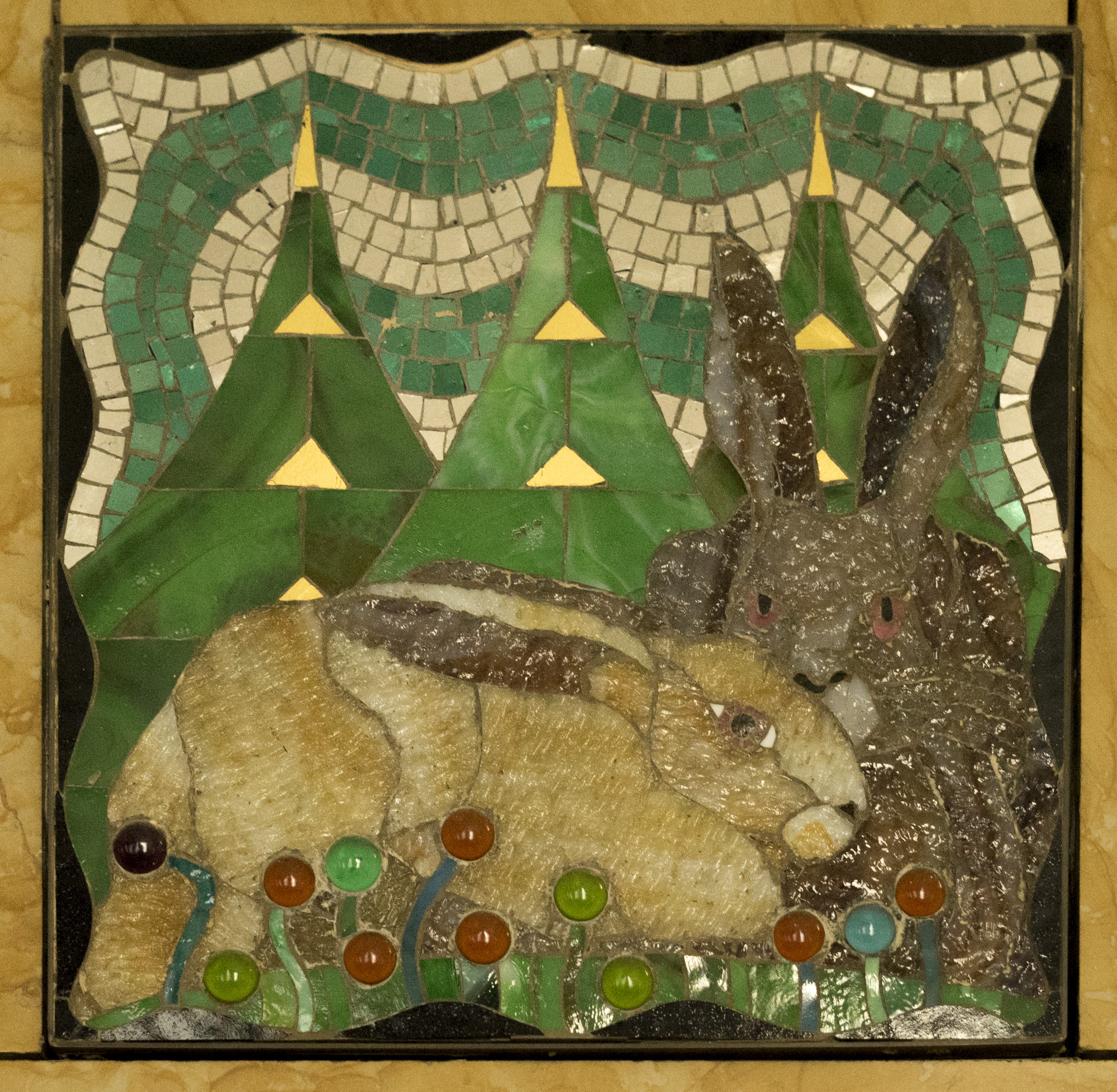
Mosaic at the Grand Hotel Wiesler, in Graz

Although his studies in Munich ran from 1902 to 1903, Forstner had begun to work as an artist, painter and illustrator from 1901. In 1906 he founded the "Wiener Mosaikwerkstätte", and two years later he was given a trade licence to produce glass mosaics. He presented work at the 1908 Wiener Kunstschau, organised by Gustav Klimt and Josef Hoffman. He also presented work at the Spring showings of the Hagenbund, a Viennese art collective.

Originally Forstner's mosaics were in the traditional Venetian or Florentine technique and style, he became famous for his mixed media and tile mosaics, for example the Klimt frieze in the Stoclet Palace. As well as his own designs, Forstner collaborated with many important artists of the time, for example Klimt, Otto Wagner, Otto Schönthal and Emil Hoppe.

Between 1908 and the outbreak of the First World War he produced his most successful work, and expanded his workshop. In 1911, he married his wife, Stephanie (née Stöger), and together they had two children, Georg (born 1912) and Karl (born 1913).

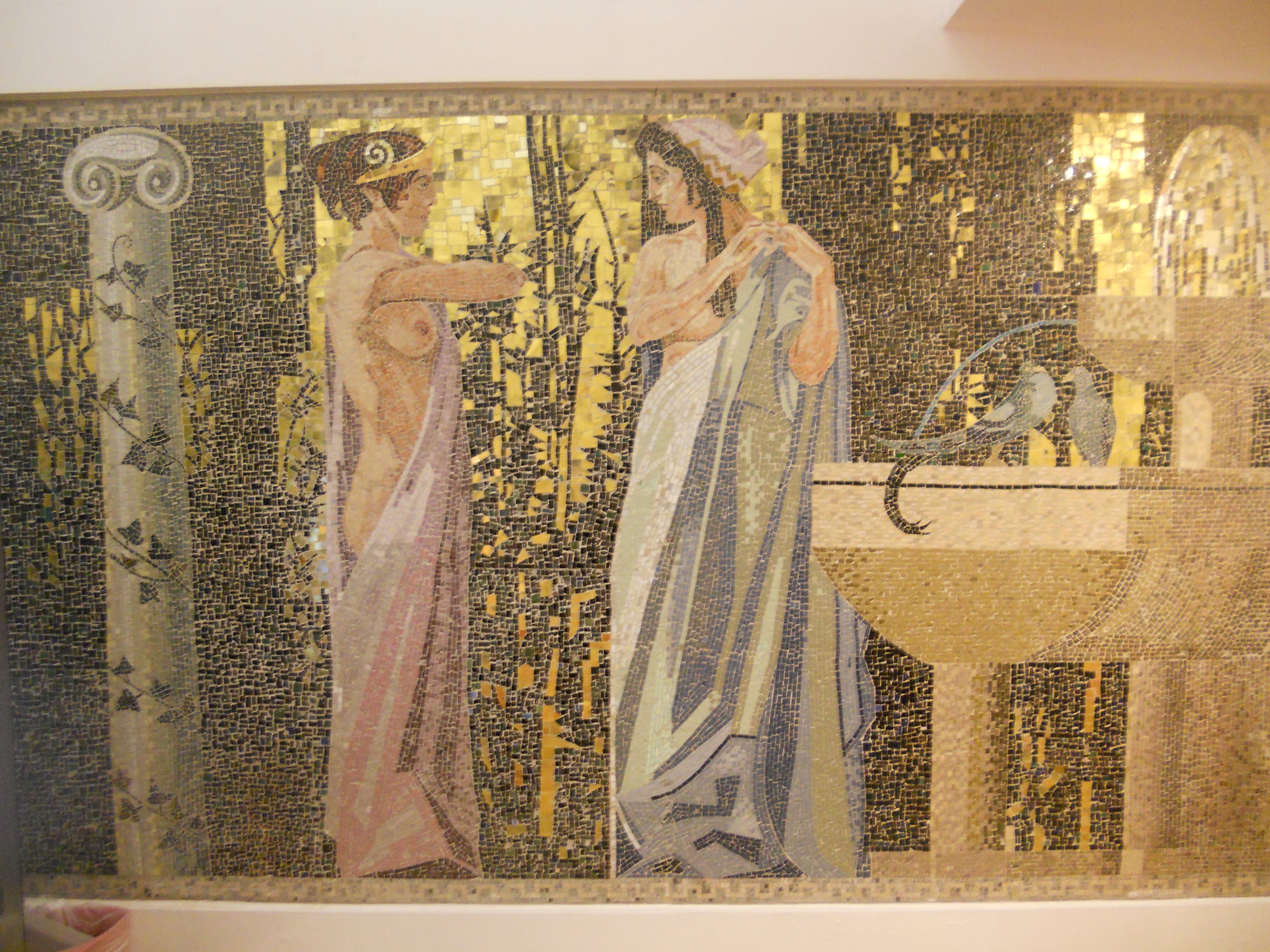
Mosaic at the Dianabad (bathhouse), in Leopoldstadt

In 1912 he became a member of the Bund Österreichischer Künstler, and with the architect Cesar Poppovits and the painter Alfred Basel, he founded the Wiener Friedhofskunst. That year, the success and popularity of his work enabled him to build his own glass kiln. In 1913 he became an associate member of the Society of Austrian Architects.

During the First World War, he was a Collection Officer in Albania and Macedonia. After the war, he moved to Stockerau, the home town of his wife. There he established two new premises but was forced to sell both.

Due to the poor economic conditions in Austria after the First World War, Forstner worked more as an all-round artist rather than focusing solely on mosaics. He worked on several War Memorials, as an architect and landscape designer and, from 1929 to 1936 as the art master at Hollabrunn Gymnasium. A road in Hollabrunn is named for him.

== Major works ==
- Glass window for the Austrian Postal Savings Bank Building (1904–1906)
- Memorial for Mozart at the Mozart House, Linz (1906)
- Venetian-style mosaic of St George and St Hubert, shown at the 1908 Wiener Kunstschau.
- Apse mosaic in parish church of Ebelsberg (near Linz), which features a relief by Wilhelm Bormann (1908).
- Mosaic of "Spring" in the Grand Hotel Wiesler in Graz (1909).
- Mosaic of the coat of arms of the Austro-Hungarian monarchy for the 1910 Wiener Jagdaustellung, together with Györgyfaloy.
- Windows and wall mosaics of the side chapel and a representation of the Four Evangelists in the dome of the Karl-Borromäus-Kirche in the Zentralfriedhof (1911).
- Mosaic friezes in the Stoclet Palace, working to Klimt's designs (1909–1911)
- Windows (to the design of Koloman Moser) and high altar mosaic (to the designs of Carl Ederer, Remigius Geyling and Rudolf Jettmar) for the Kirche am Steinhof (1906–1912)
- Mosaics in the entrance hall of the Dianabades (1914).
- Mosaic of St. George for the church tower of Stockerau, 1914–1916. (The mosaic was removed in 1937 but restored in 1989. It now resides in chapel of Stockerau Hospital.)
- Dragoon war memorial, Stockerau (1926)
- New design for the city park of Stockerau (1928)
- Memorial for the fallen of the First World War, Stockerau Gymnasium (1930)
- Glassmaker for the St. Gertrude Window in the parish church of Währing.
