= Stoclet Frieze =

Series of mosaics created by Gustav Klimt

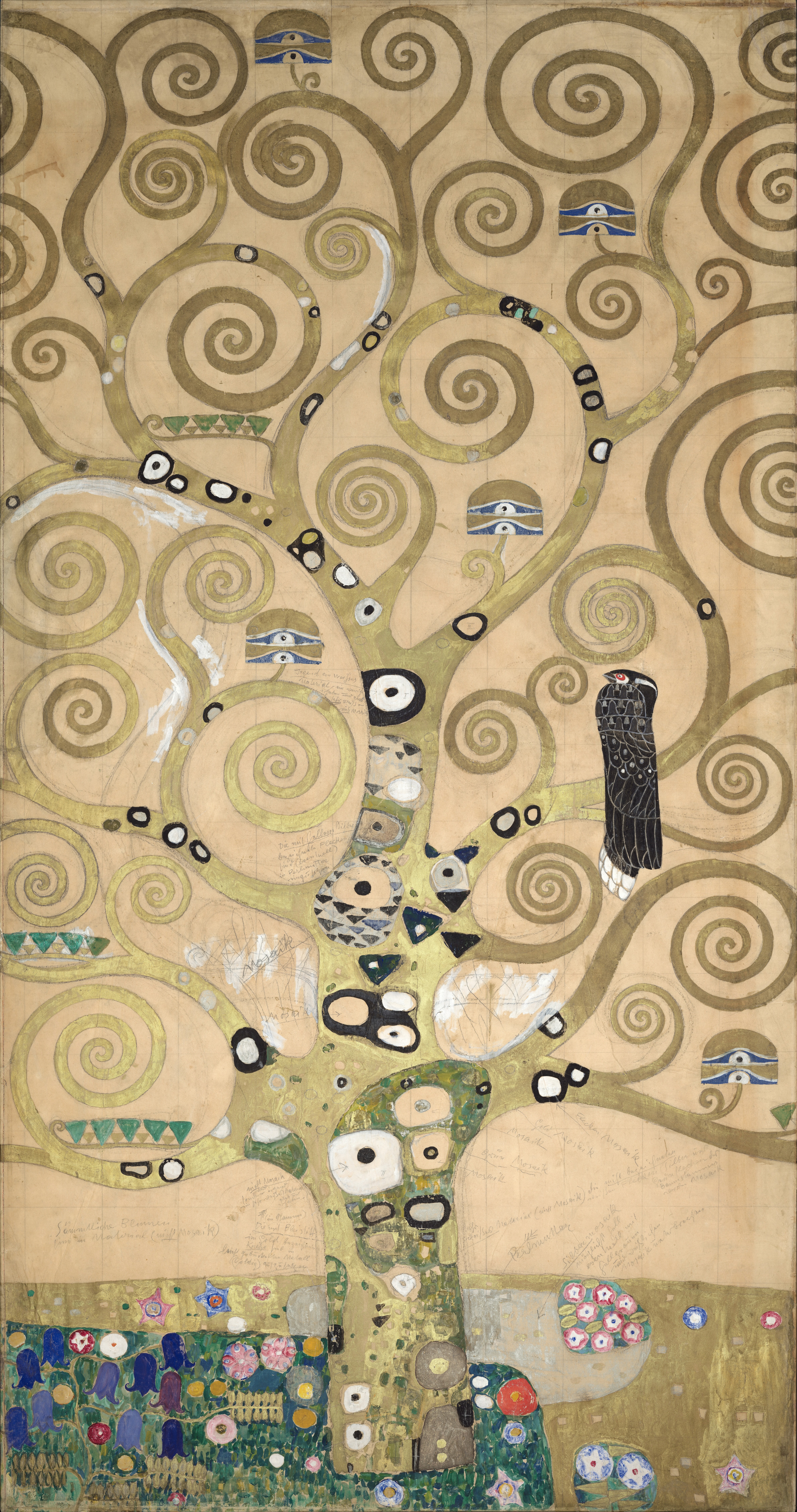
Tree of Life detail from the Stoclet Frieze

The Stoclet Frieze is a series of three mosaics created by the Austrian painter Gustav Klimt for a 1905–1911 commission for the Stoclet Palace in Brussels, Belgium. The panels depict swirling Tree of life, a standing female figure and an embracing couple.

== Commission and display ==
The mosaics form a part of a larger commission by the Belgian financier Adolphe Stoclet and his wife Suzanne. The Stoclets hired the architect Josef Hoffmann and the Wiener Werkstätte artistic collective ('Viennese Workshop') to design, decorate and furnish a spacious mansion with formal gardens. The pair were avid art collectors with wide-ranging and eclectic tastes: their collection included work from many periods and cultures, from the Far East to the New World and included Egyptian sculpture, Chinese ceramics and jades, Byzantine icons and jewelry, miniatures from Persia and Armenia, as well as numerous Western medieval paintings. The diverse tastes of his patrons corresponded well with Gustav Klimt's own. Art historian M.E. Warlick notes that he "must have been delighted to find that their eclectic collection so matched many of his own recent interests".

The panels were commissioned and placed along three walls of the Stoclet Palace's dining room, with the two larger, figural sections set across from each other along the longer walls of the room. A smaller geometric panel occupies the short wall separating them. The designs are decorated with a variety of luxury materials, including marble, ceramic, gilded tiles and enamel along with pearls and other semi-precious stones.

== Gallery ==
The three mosaics were originally displayed on three separate walls, with the Knight mosaic positioned centrally and the larger mosaics, each centering on a Tree of Life motif, positioned on walls to the left and right.

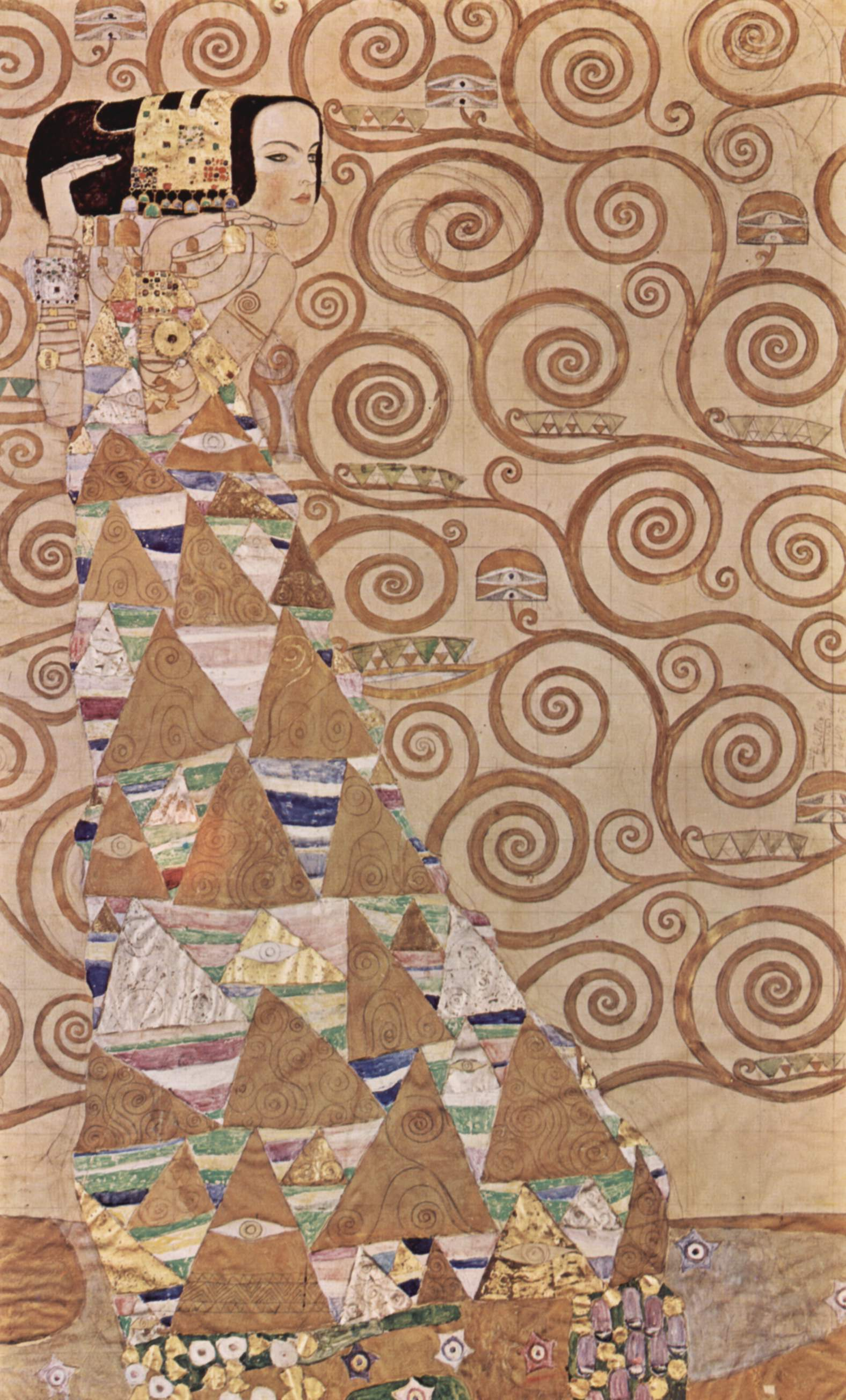
The Expectation

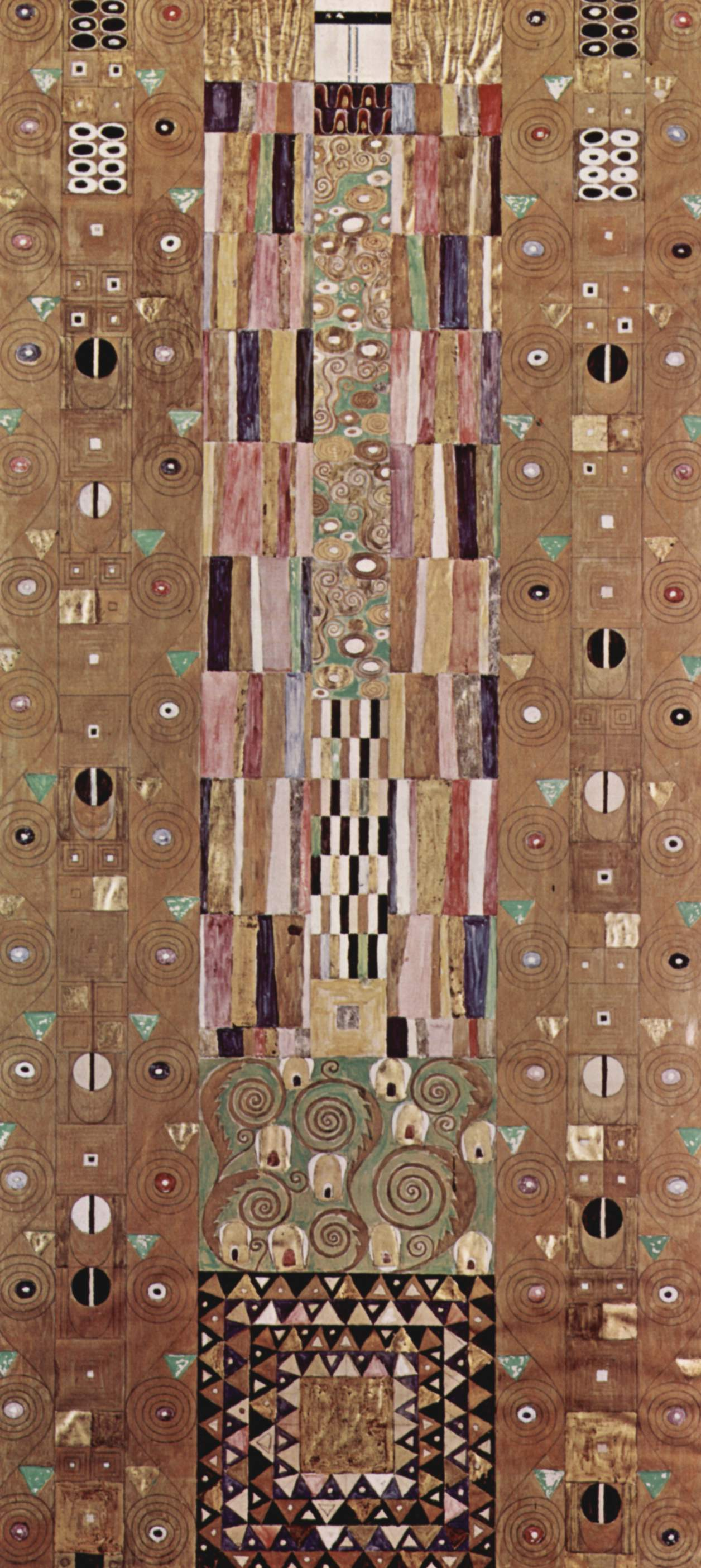
Knight

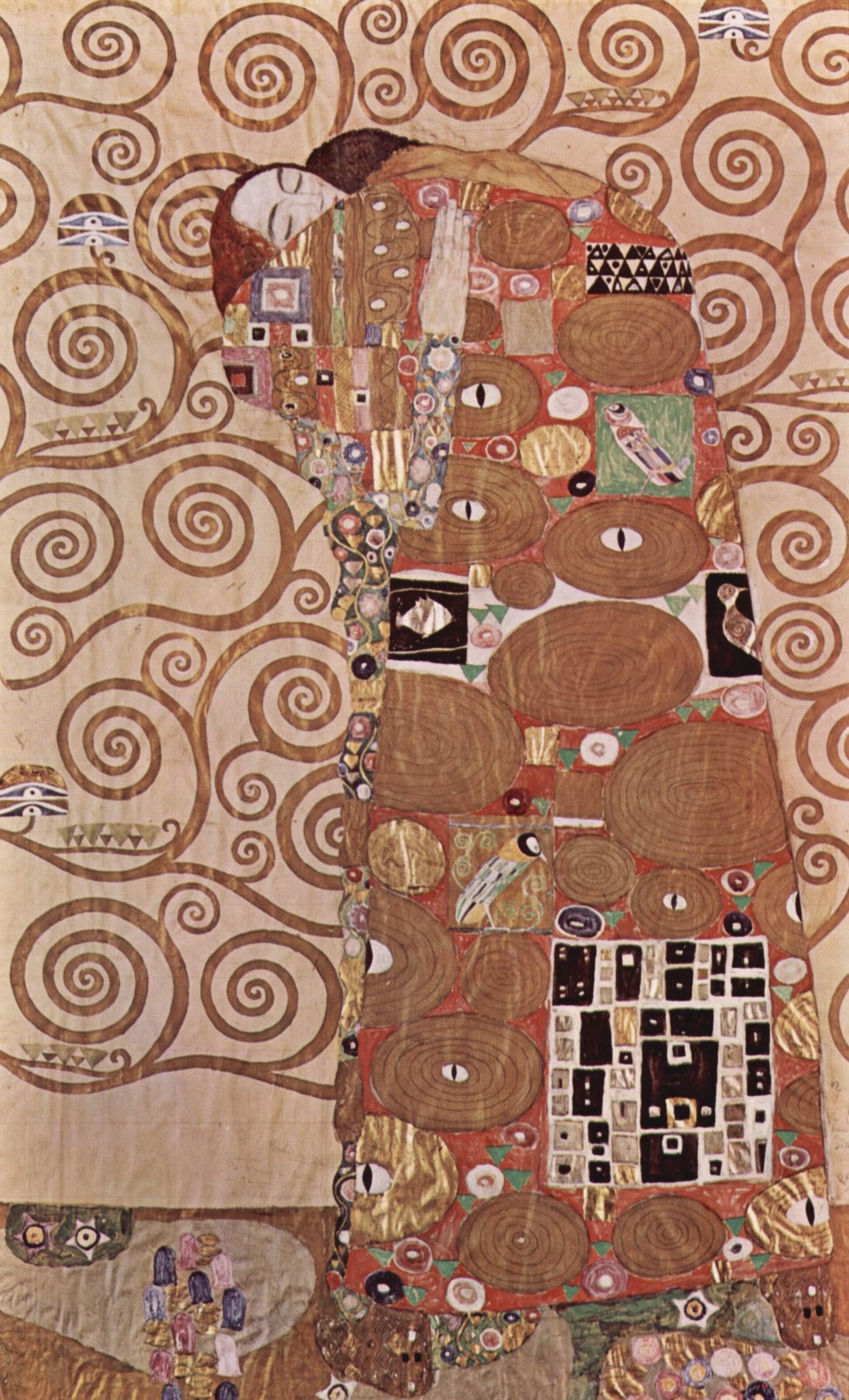
The Embrace

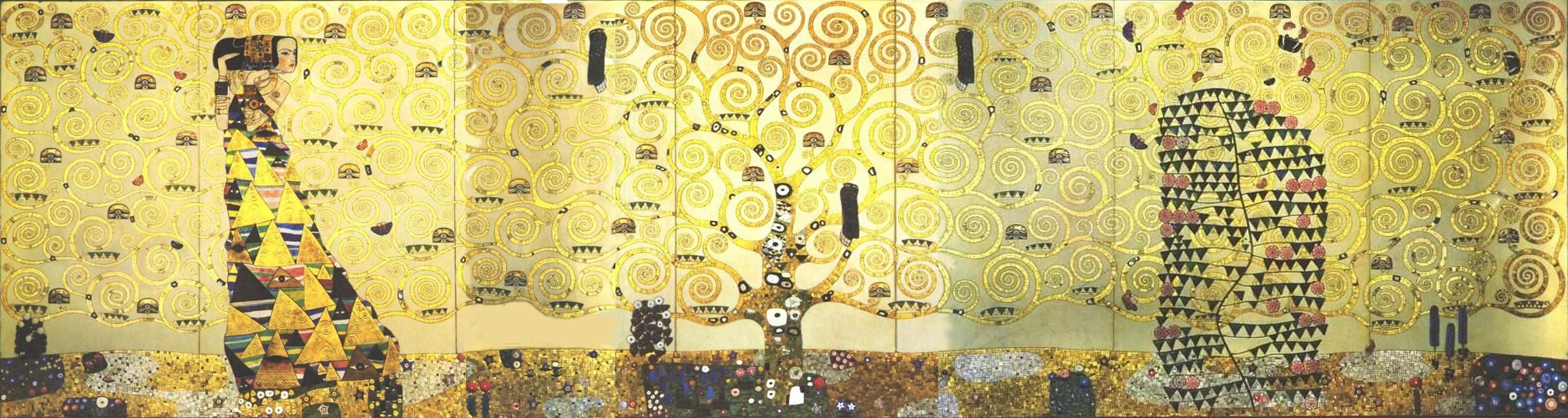
The left panel

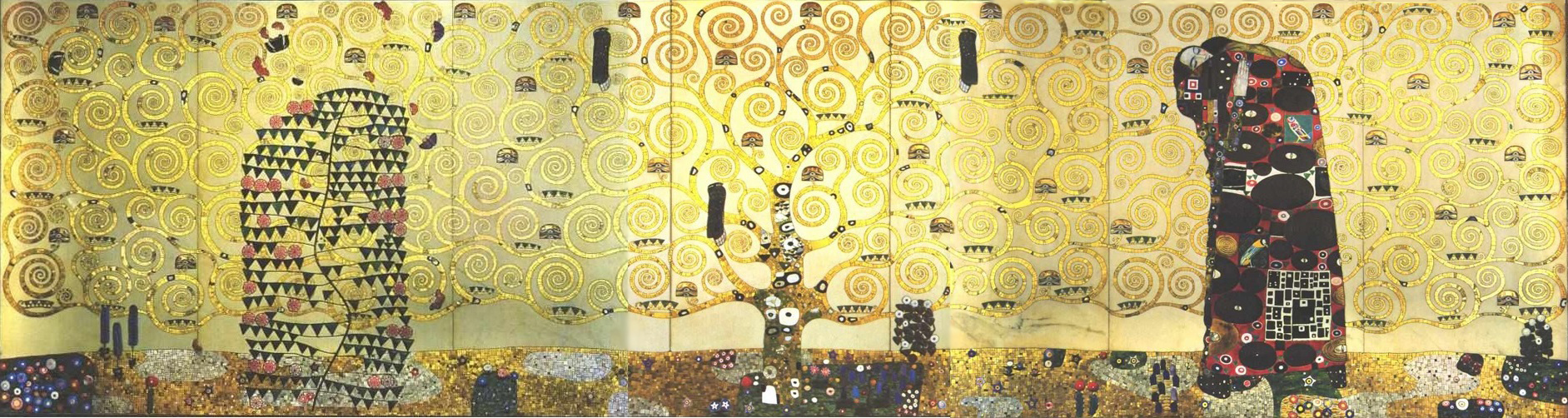
The right panel

== See also ==
- The Tree of Life, Stoclet Frieze
- List of paintings by Gustav Klimt

== Sources ==
- Freytag, Annette. "Josef Hoffmann's Unknown Masterpiece: The Garden of Stoclet House in Brussels (1905–1911)" (2010), Studies in the History of Gardens and Designed Landscapes, Vol. 30, No. 4, pp. 337–372.
- Warlick, M.E. "Mythic Rebirth in Gustav Klimt's Stoclet Frieze: New Considerations of Its Egyptianizing Form and Content", The Art Bulletin, Vol. 74, No. 1 (March 1992), pp. 115–134.
