= Stoclet Palace =

Building and UNESCO World Heritage Site by Josef Hoffmann in Brussels, Belgium

- Palais Stoclet (French); Stocletpaleis (Dutch)
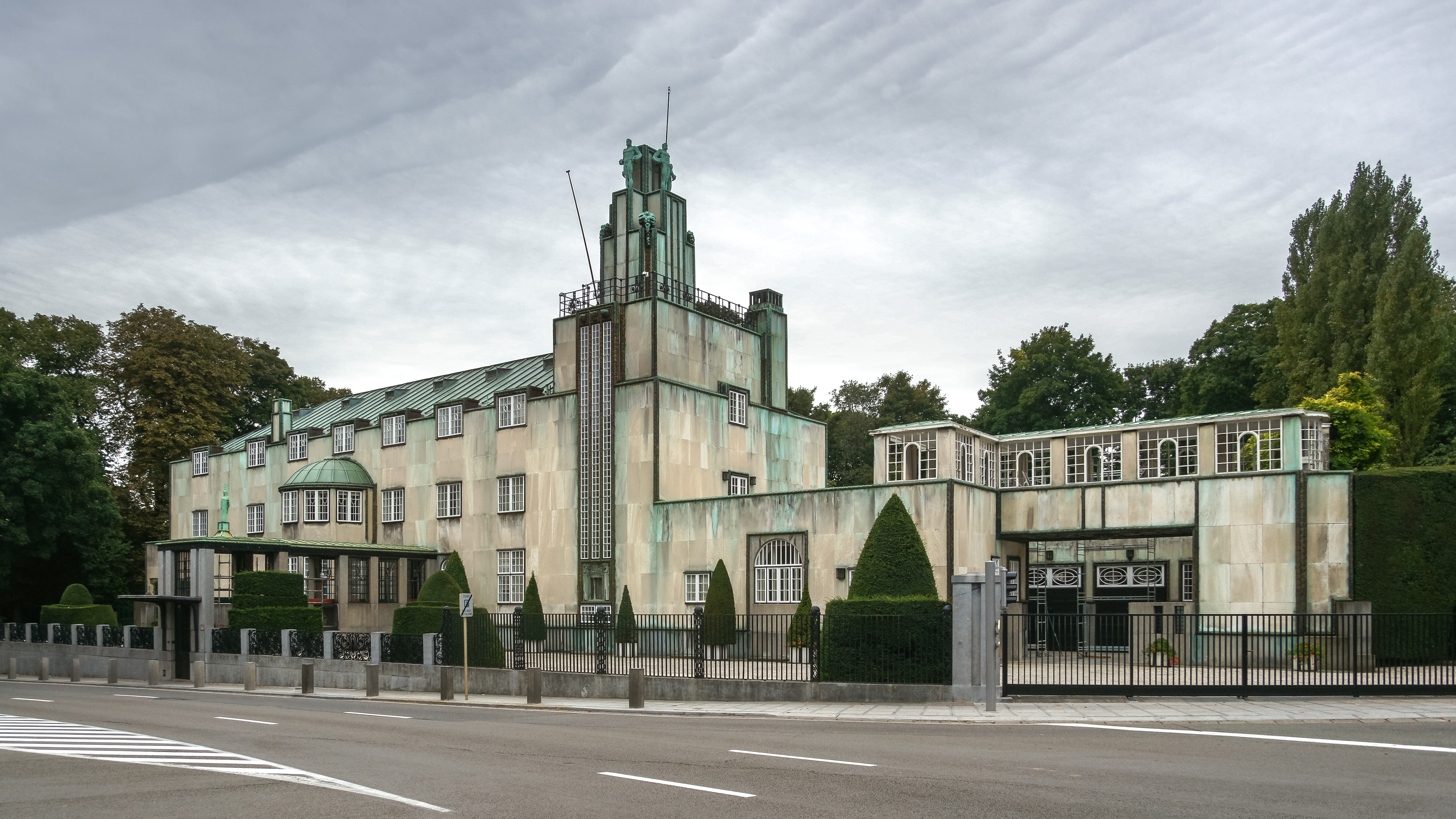
- The Stoclet Palace seen from the Avenue de Tervueren/Tervurenlaan
- Alternative names: Stoclet House

General information
- Type: Private house
- Architectural style: Vienna Secession
- Location: Avenue de Tervueren / Tervurenlaan 279–281, 1150 Woluwe-Saint-Pierre, Brussels-Capital Region, Belgium
- Coordinates: 50°50′07″N 4°24′58″E
- Construction started: 1905
- Completed: 1911
- Client: Adolphe Stoclet
- Owner: Stoclet family

Design and construction
- Architect: Josef Hoffmann
- Other designers: Gustav Klimt, Franz Metzner, Fernand Khnopff

UNESCO World Heritage Site
- Official name: Stoclet House
- Type: Cultural
- Criteria: i, ii
- Designated: 2009 (33rd session)
- Reference no.: 1298
- Region: Europe and North America

The Stoclet Palace (French: Palais Stoclet [palɛ stɔklɛ]; Dutch: Stocletpaleis [stɔˈklɛːpaːˌlɛis]), also known as the Stoclet House, is a historic mansion in Woluwe-Saint-Pierre, a municipality of Brussels, Belgium. It was designed by the Austrian-Moravian architect Josef Hoffmann for the Belgian financier Adolphe Stoclet, and built between 1905 and 1911, in the Vienna Secession style. It is located at 279–281, avenue de Tervueren/Tervurenlaan, bordering the Square Léopold II/Leopold II-plein.

The residence is described as one of the 20th century's most refined and luxurious private houses, and is a visible turning point from historical styles to modern architecture. It is also a prototype of the Art Deco style, featuring geometric volumes, symmetry, straight lines, concrete covered with marble plaques, finely-sculpted ornament, and lavish interiors, including mosaic friezes by Gustav Klimt.

The Stoclet Palace is still owned by the Stoclet family and is not open to visitors. Until recently, no outsider, not even experts helping with restoration, were allowed in. The building has received protected status by the Monuments and Sites Directorate of the Brussels-Capital Region, and it has been a UNESCO World Heritage Site since 2009.

== History ==
=== Design and construction ===
The Stoclet Palace was commissioned by Adolphe Stoclet, a wealthy Belgian financier and art collector, and his wife Suzanne. The Stoclets hired the 35-year-old Austrian architect Josef Hoffmann, who was a founding member of the Vienna Secession, a radical group of designers and artists established in 1897, to build them their own mansion. Stoclet had met Hoffmann while in Vienna to oversee the construction of a railroad, and he shared his avant-garde artistic inclinations. While Stoclet initially considered building the house in Vienna, he eventually settled on a site in Brussels.

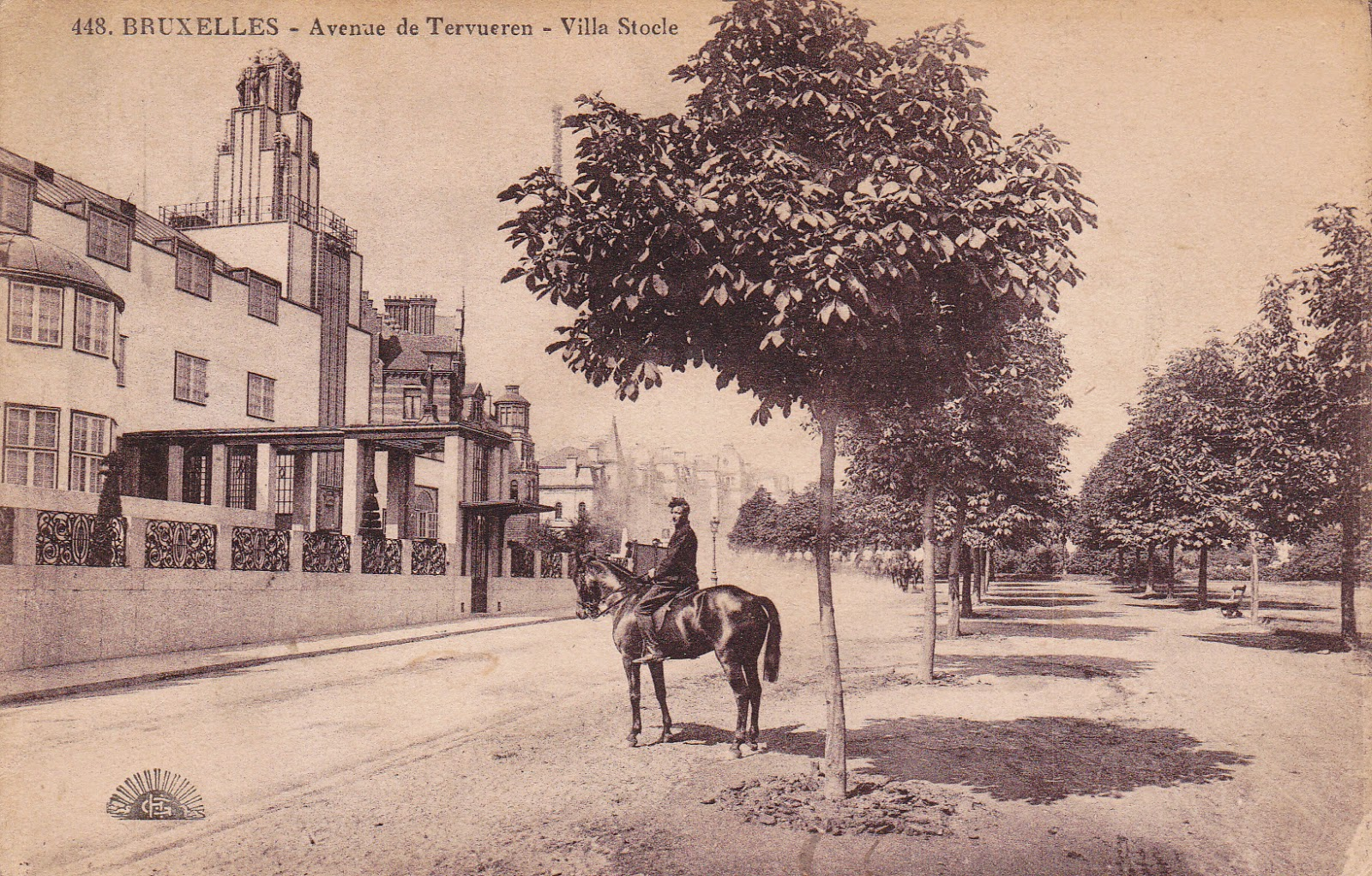
The Stoclet Palace and the Avenue de Tervueren/Tervurenlaan, before 1914

The Stoclet Palace was the first residential project for the Wiener Werkstätte (Vienna Workshops), co-founded by Hoffmann in 1903. Hoffmann abandoned fashions and styles of the past and produced a building that is an asymmetrical compilation of rectangular blocks, underlined by exaggerated lines and corners. The architect received not only artistic licence for the design, but also an unlimited budget. Hoffmann and his colleagues designed every aspect of the mansion, down to the door handles and light fittings.

In his designs for the Stoclet Palace, Hoffmann was particularly attuned to fashion and to the Viennese identity of the new style of interior, even designing a dress for Madame Stoclet so that she would not clash with her living room decor as she had while wearing a French Paul Poiret gown. Hoffmann left much of the interior decoration to the painters Gustav Klimt and Fernand Khnopff. He presented the plans in 1905, but the construction, in three stages, was not completed until 1911.

During a visit in September 1912, a group of modernist Belgian architects, which included Jean-Baptiste Dewin, described the Stoclet Palace in poetic terms, one writing in the journal Tekhne: "Baudelaire would have dreamt this … marble and gold; it is cold and captivating … The garden is wonderful! But the sun is an accomplice. I have to come back when it is raining."

=== Later history ===
Adolphe Stoclet resided in the Stoclet Palace until his death on 3 November 1949. His wife died a fortnight later, and the Stoclet Palace was inherited by his daughter-in-law, Annie Stoclet. The building was classified as a historical monument in 1976. Following Annie's death in 2002, the mansion was inherited by her four daughters. It was designated as a World Heritage Site by UNESCO in 2009.

The Stoclet Palace has never been open to the public. Press reports have described the mansion as being looked after by two caretakers while there is dissension between Stoclet's four granddaughters as to its future. In 2024, however, the Brussels Parliament approved a motion ordering its opening for a period of maximum 15 days per year, although it remains unclear when this will be put into practice.

== Description ==
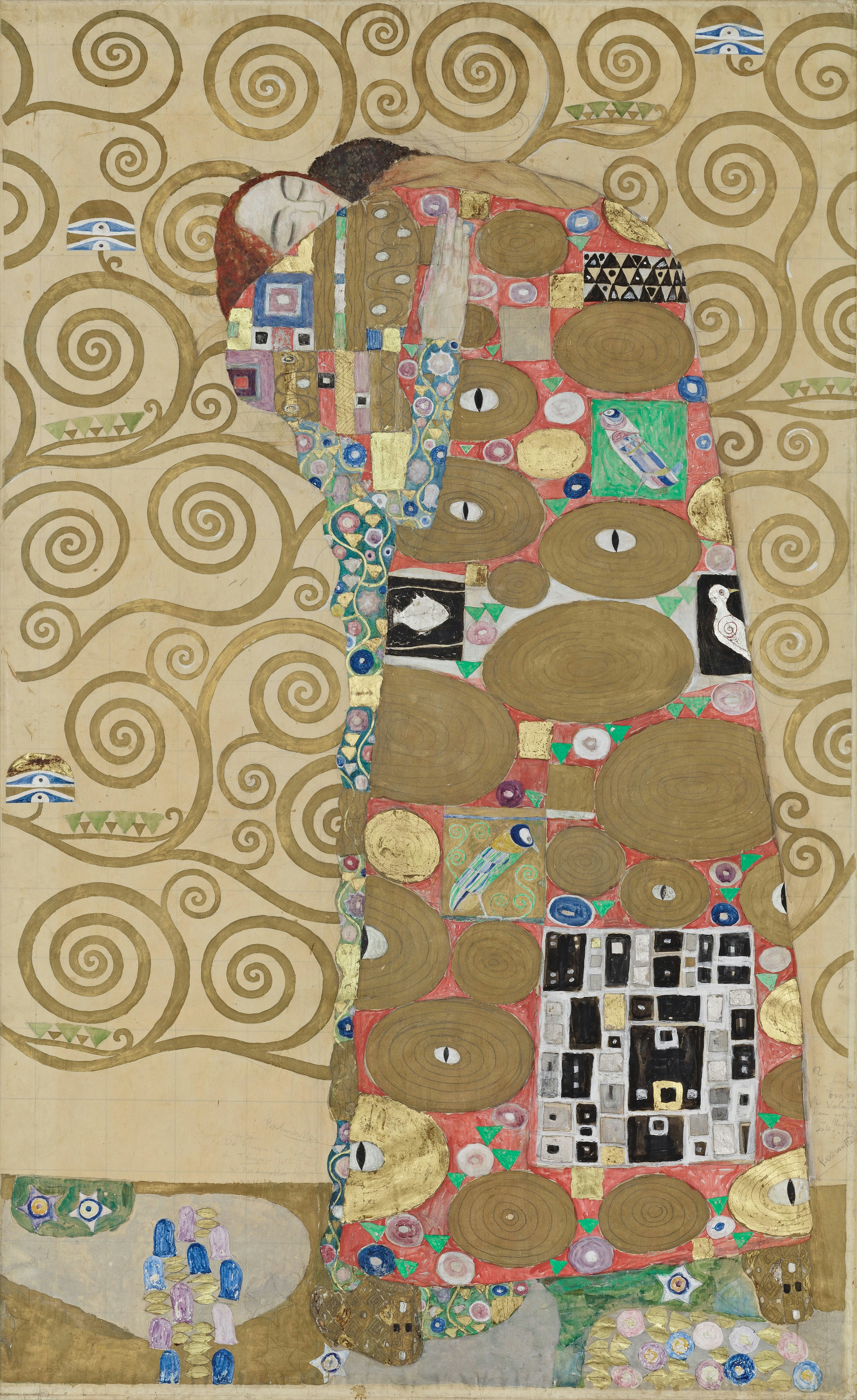
Detail of the preparatory design by Gustav Klimt for the mosaic friezes of the main dining room of the Stoclet Palace (Museum of Applied Arts, Vienna)

The Stoclet Palace is located at 279–281, avenue de Tervueren/Tervurenlaan, in the Woluwe-Saint-Pierre municipality of Brussels. The building was designed to appear from the road as a stately city mansion. Seen from the garden at the back, it "becomes a villa suburbana with its rear façade sculpturally modelled by bay windows, balconies and terraces" in the words of architectural historian Annette Freytag, which gave the Stoclet family a building with "all the advantages of a comfortable urban mansion and a country house at the same time."

The integration of architects, artists, and artisans makes the Stoclet Palace an example of a Gesamtkunstwerk ("total work of art"), one of the defining characteristics of Art Nouveau. Paul Dujardin, art historian and former director-general of the Centre for Fine Arts in Brussels, considers the mansion to be the first true Art Deco building, but he does not identify a distinct Belgian style, instead highlighting the country's "in-between hybridity".

=== Exterior ===
The exterior of the Stoclet Palace, featuring strict geometric forms and subtle decorative elements, is strikingly modern. It is composed of large cubes assembled together and covered in white Norwegian marble, mounting to a tower that rises above the stairwell, while the edges of the forms and the windows are bordered with sculpted metal. The plan has two perpendicular axes, with the main one running along the avenue.

The starkness of the exterior is softened by artistic windows that break through the line of the eaves, as well as a rooftop conservatory. The central tower, nearly 20 metres (66 ft) high, is crowned with four copper sculptures of nude males and other statuary by the German sculptor Franz Metzner. Regimented, upright balustrades, touched with Art Nouveau ornamentation, line the balconies. The railings around the building and on the tower feature stylised ornamental designs, and even the plants in the garden are sculpted into geometric shapes to complement the architecture.

=== Interior ===
The interior of the building, by Hoffmann and the artists of the Wiener Werkstätte, is much more lavish than the exterior, with upright, geometrically coordinated furniture and minimal clutter. This was an avant-garde approach, presenting a "reformed interior" where function dictated form. It resembles a series of stage sets, offering carefully planned views from one room to the other. The floors are made of parquet from exotic woods, with different designs in each room.

The interior is decorated with walls of white marble and antique green marble panelling, as well as artworks, including murals by Ludwig Heinrich Jungnickel. The dining room features a set of three large mosaic murals, known as the Stoclet Frieze, designed by Gustav Klimt, and implemented on site by Leopold Forstner, Klimt's sketches for the dining room are in the permanent collection of the Museum of Applied Arts (MAK) in Vienna.

Every detail of the house, including the rectangular white marble bathtub, surrounded by marble plaques with sculpture and placed on a blue marble floor, the polished palisander wood panelling in the bedroom, and the kitchen counters, floor and furniture, were made by the Werkstätte and planned to harmonise with the overall design.

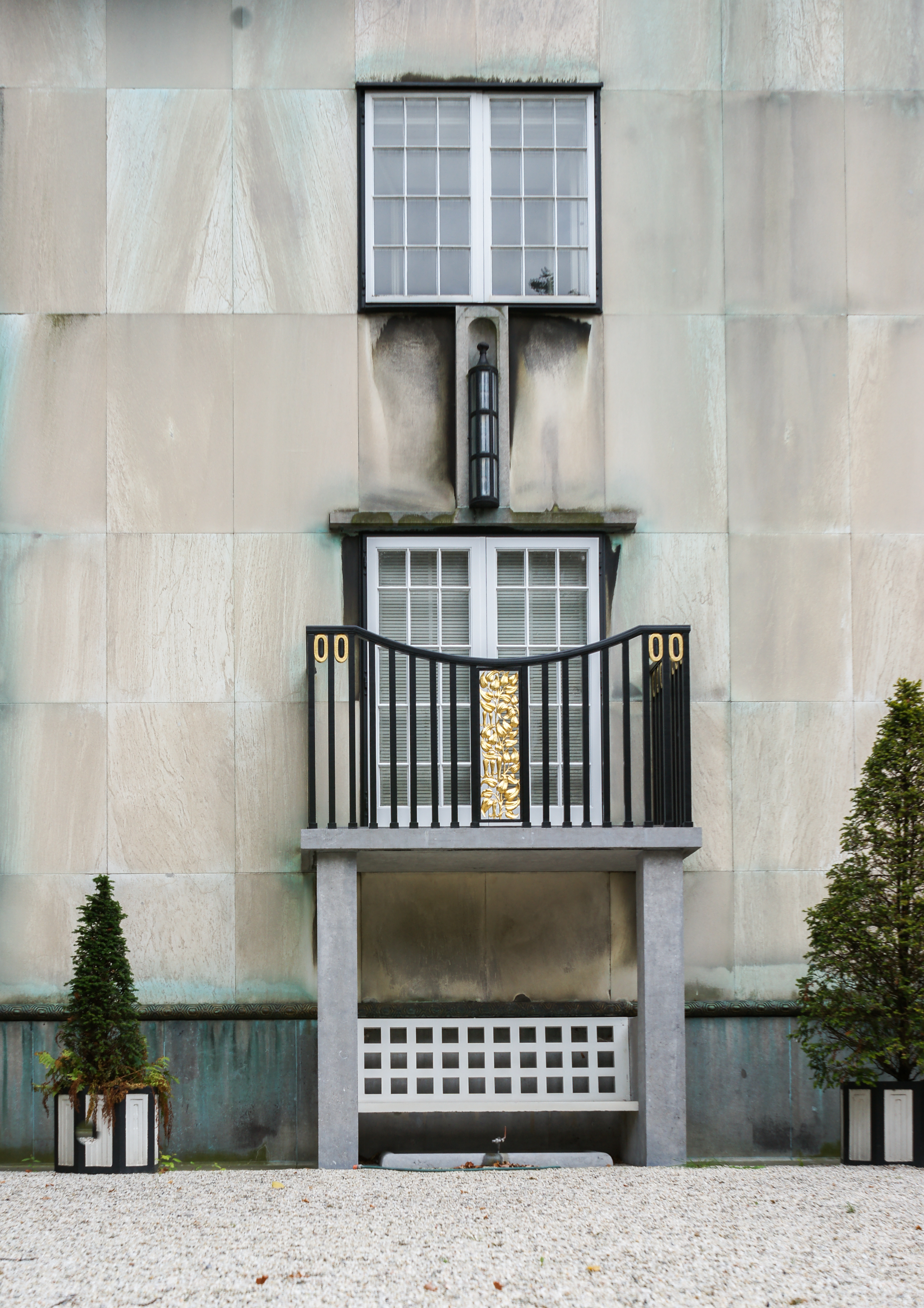
Windows of the Stoclet Palace

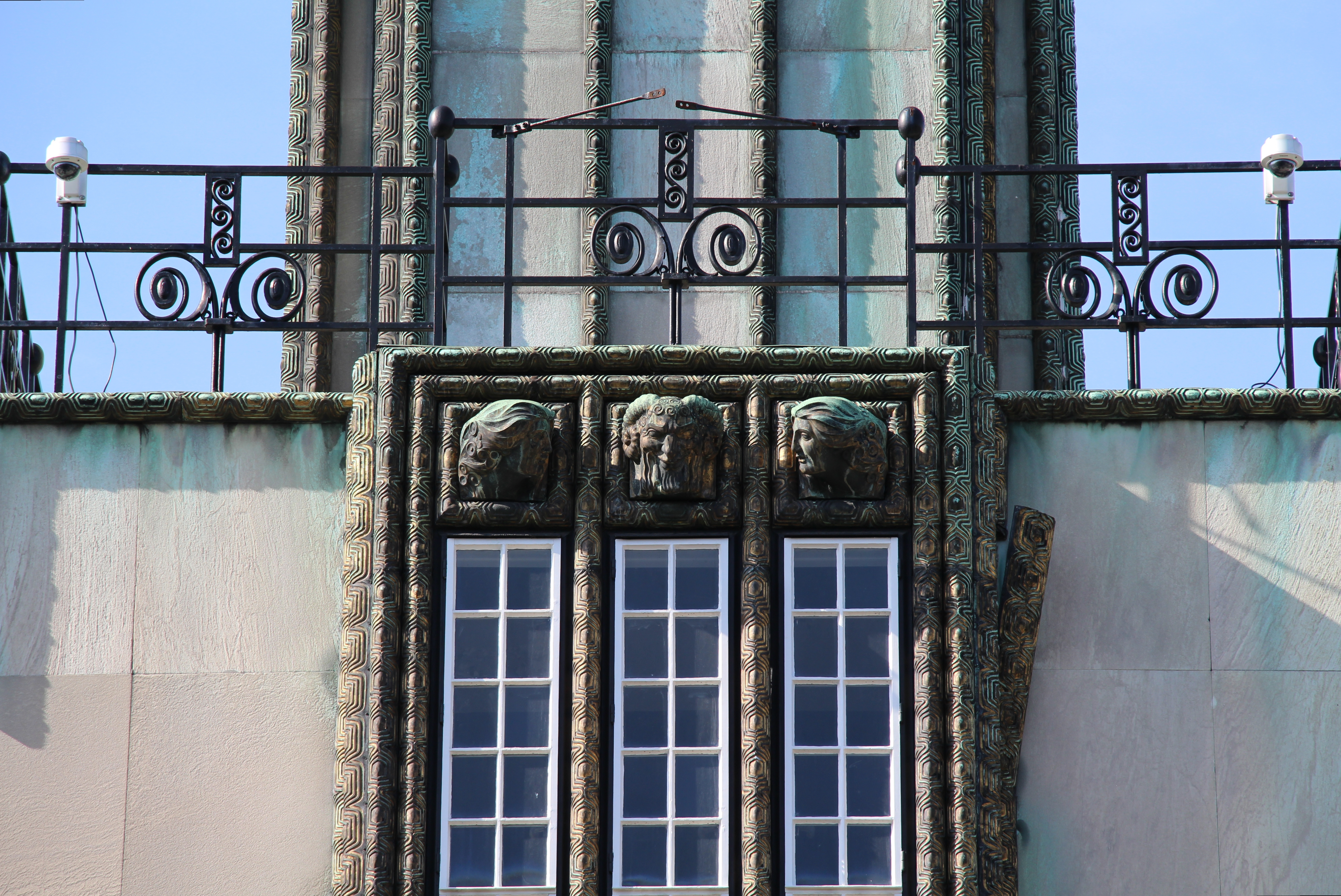
Detail of the façade, made of reinforced concrete covered with marble plaques

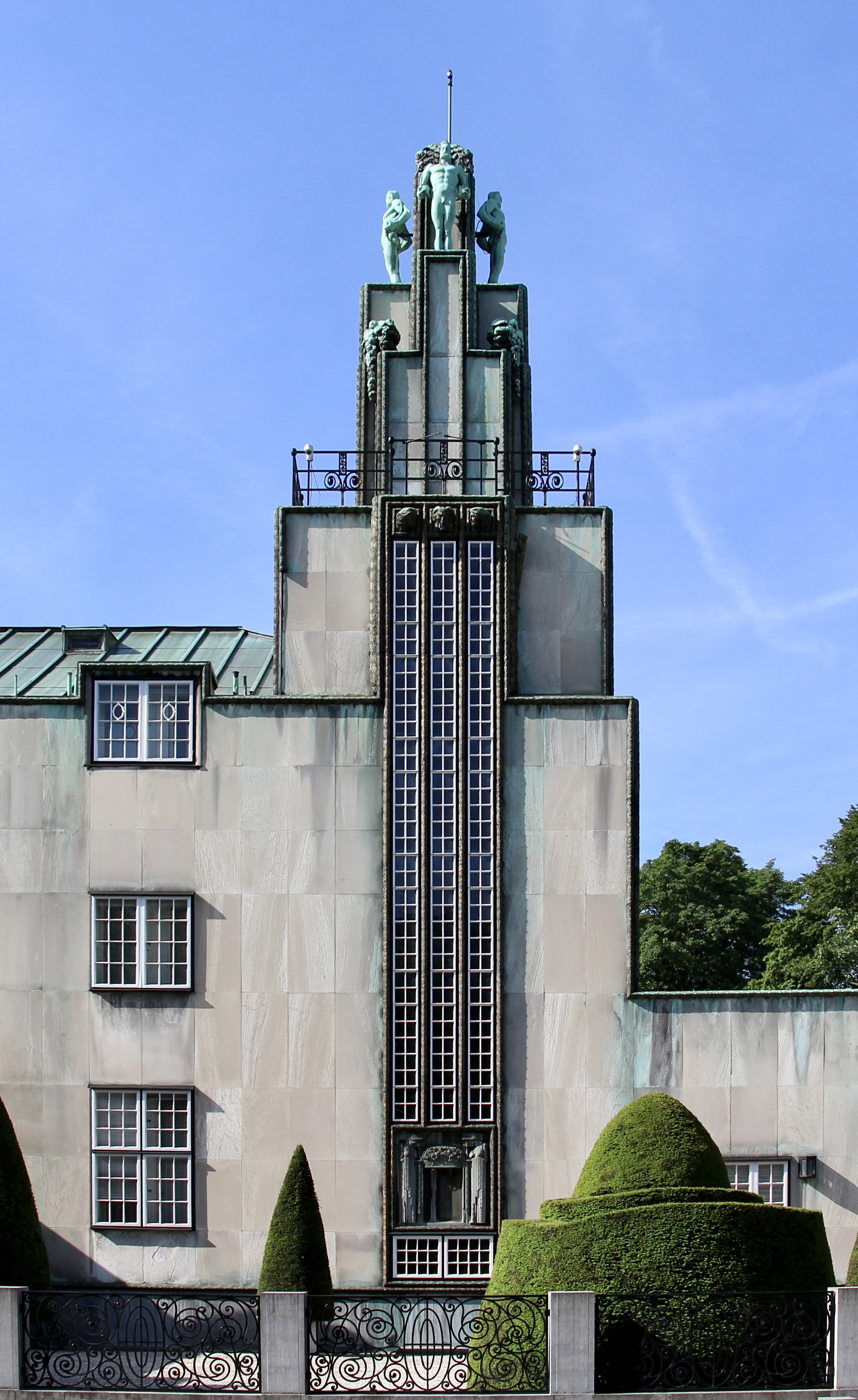
The cupola

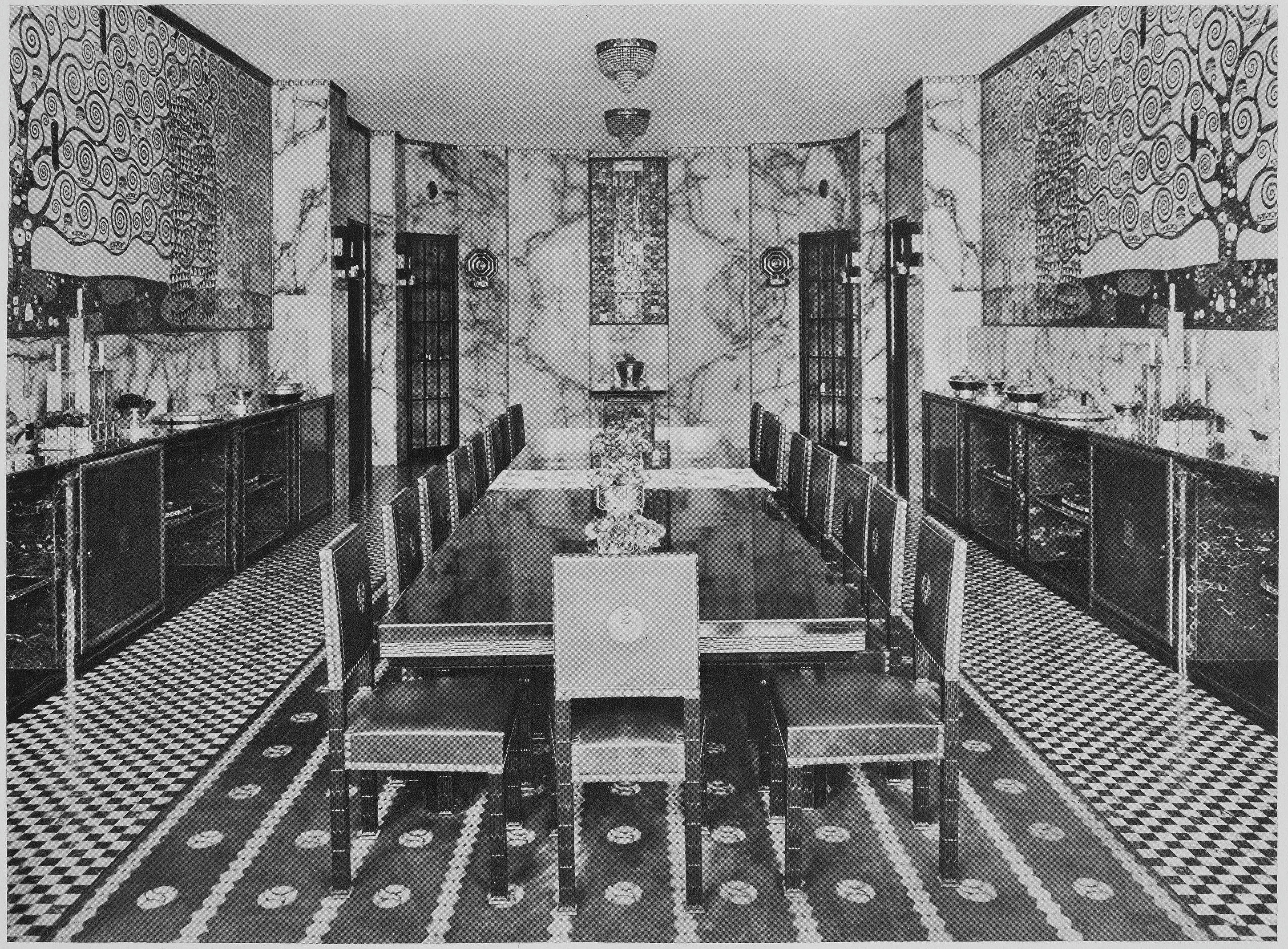
The dining room, with furniture by Hoffmann and mosaic frieze by Klimt

== See also ==
- Villa Empain
- Art Nouveau in Brussels
- Art Deco in Brussels
- History of Brussels
- Culture of Belgium
- Belgium in the long nineteenth century
