= Antoine Varlet =

Belgian architect

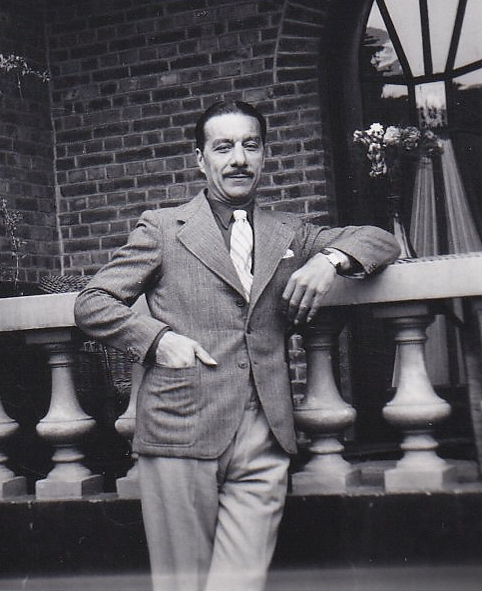
- Born: Antoine Joseph Varlet; 1 August 1893; Grivegnée, Belgium
- Died: 17 November 1940 (aged 47); Ixelles, Belgium
- Occupation: Architect

Antoine Varlet (/ˈvɑːrlət/, 1 August 1893, Grivegnée – 17 November 1940, Ixelles) was a Belgian architect. He specialised in luxury apartment buildings in Beaux-Arts and later Art Deco styles.

== Biography ==
Antoine Varlet was, with Michel Polak and Sta Jasinski [fr], one of the pioneers of apartment building construction in Brussels. His name appeared for the first time in the Brussels landscape in 1923 for an industrial complex at 42, rue de la Gare/Stationstraat in Etterbeek, in collaboration with his brother, the architect Walthère Varlet. Still in 1923, they renovated a neoclassical building together at 27, rue de l'Est/Ooststraat. In 1927, he signed his first apartment building at 110, avenue de Tervueren/Tervurenlaan.

Varlet was a follower, like his colleague Pierre De Groef [fr], of the Beaux-Arts style in the middle of the Art Deco era. However, he quickly turned from 1929 onwards to an Art Deco style mixed with elements of Beaux-Arts. His specialty was makings buildings at street corners which give a wider perspective, a practice which has served as a precedent for many architects in Brussels since then.

== Beaux-Arts era ==
- 1927: Avenue de Tervueren/Tervurenlaan 110
- 1928: Robert Schuman Roundabout 8–9
- 1929: Avenue de Cortenbergh/Kortenberglaan 43, corner with Avenue de la Renaissance/Renaissancelaan 1
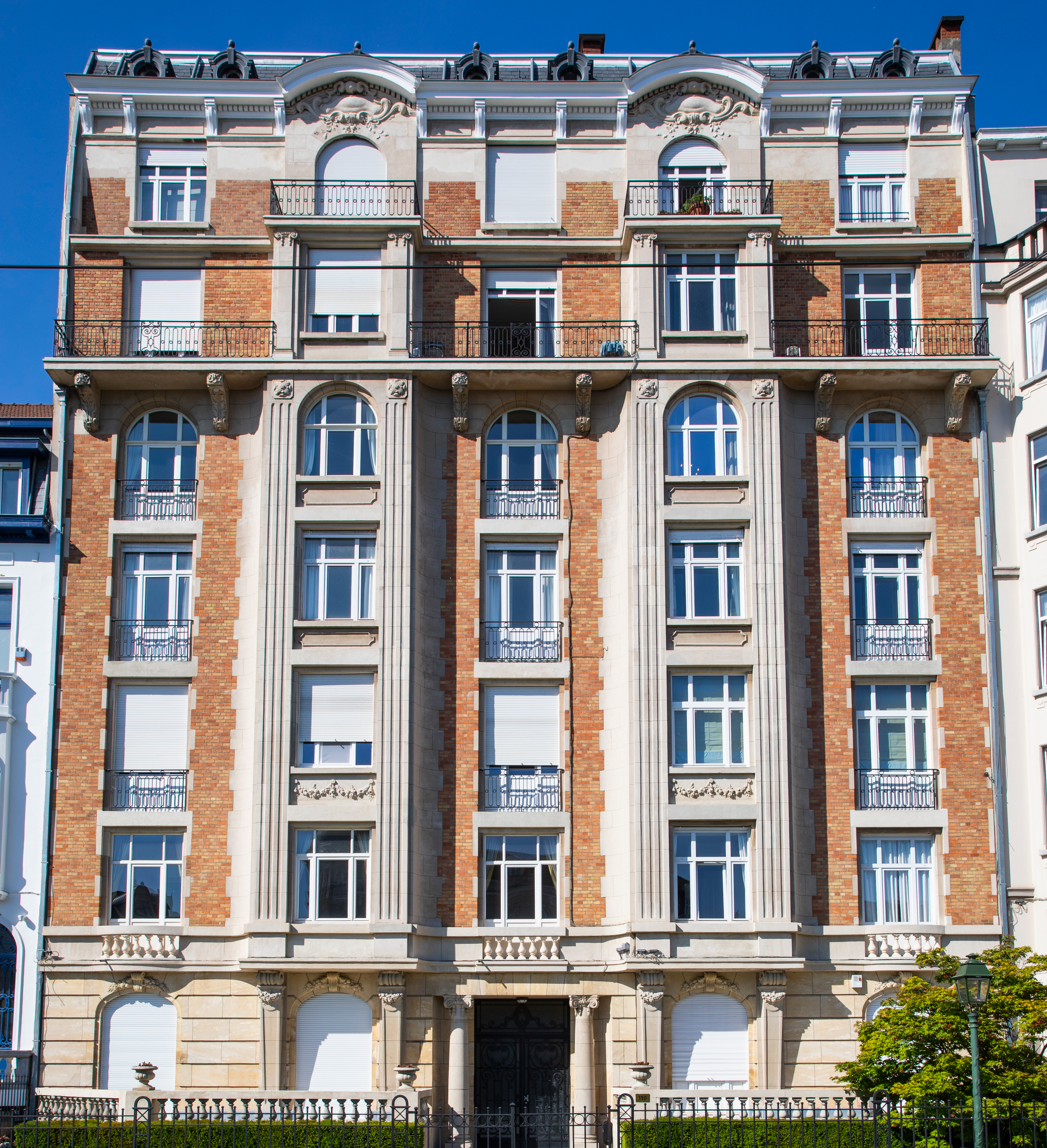
Apartment building, Avenue de Tervueren/Tervurenlaan 110 (1927)

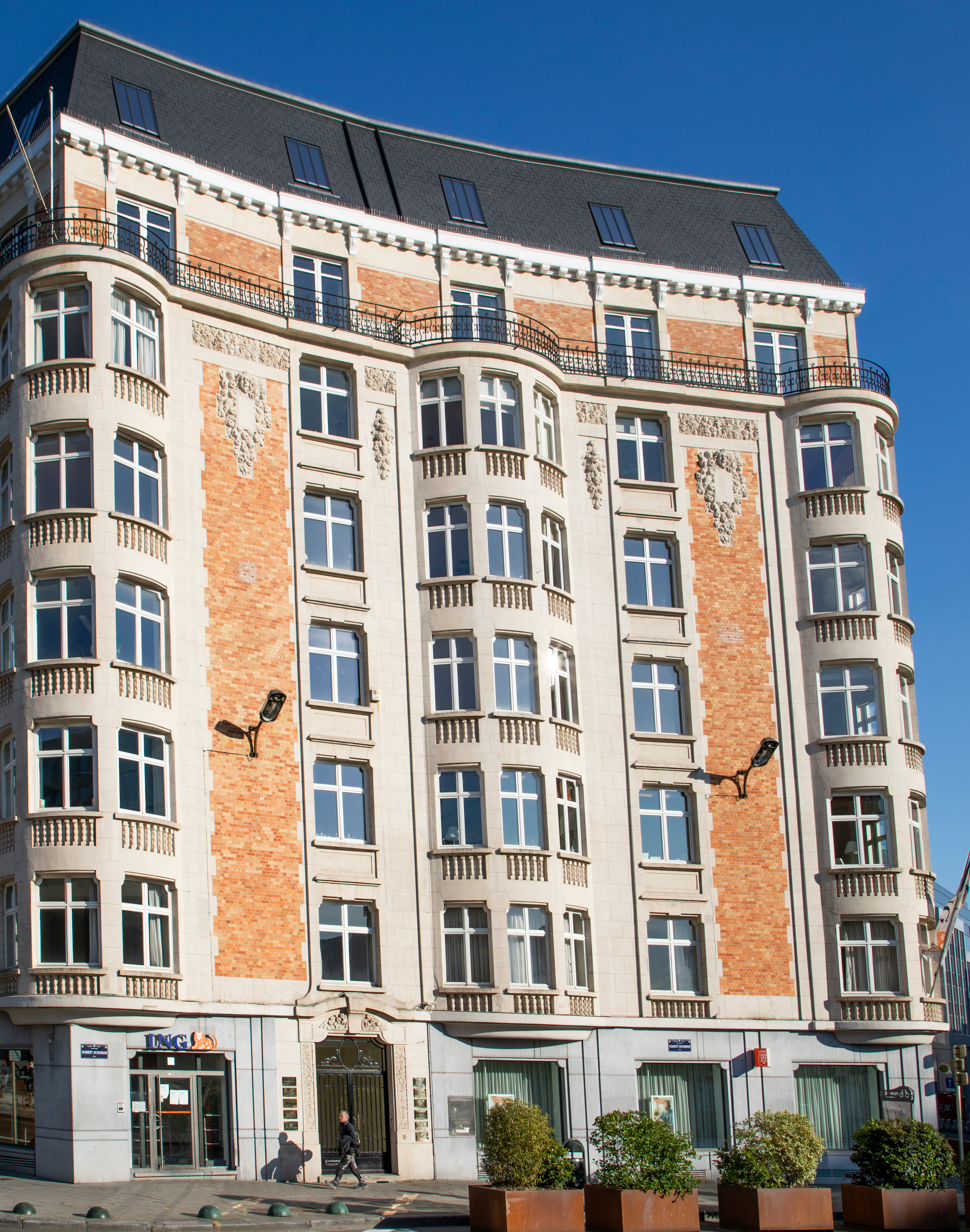
Building, Robert Schuman Roundabout 8–9 (1928)

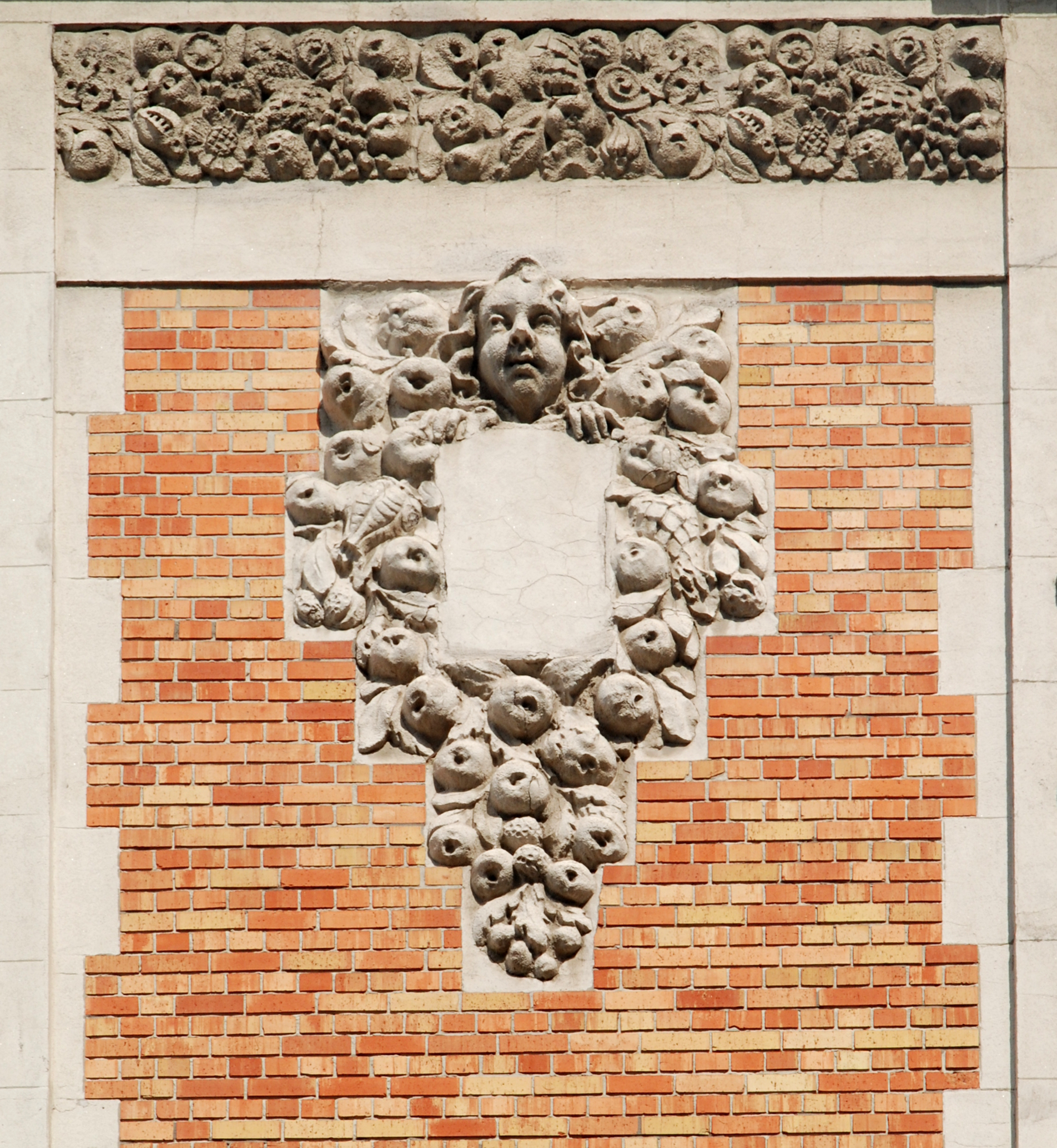
Beaux-Arts decoration of the building, Schuman Roundabout

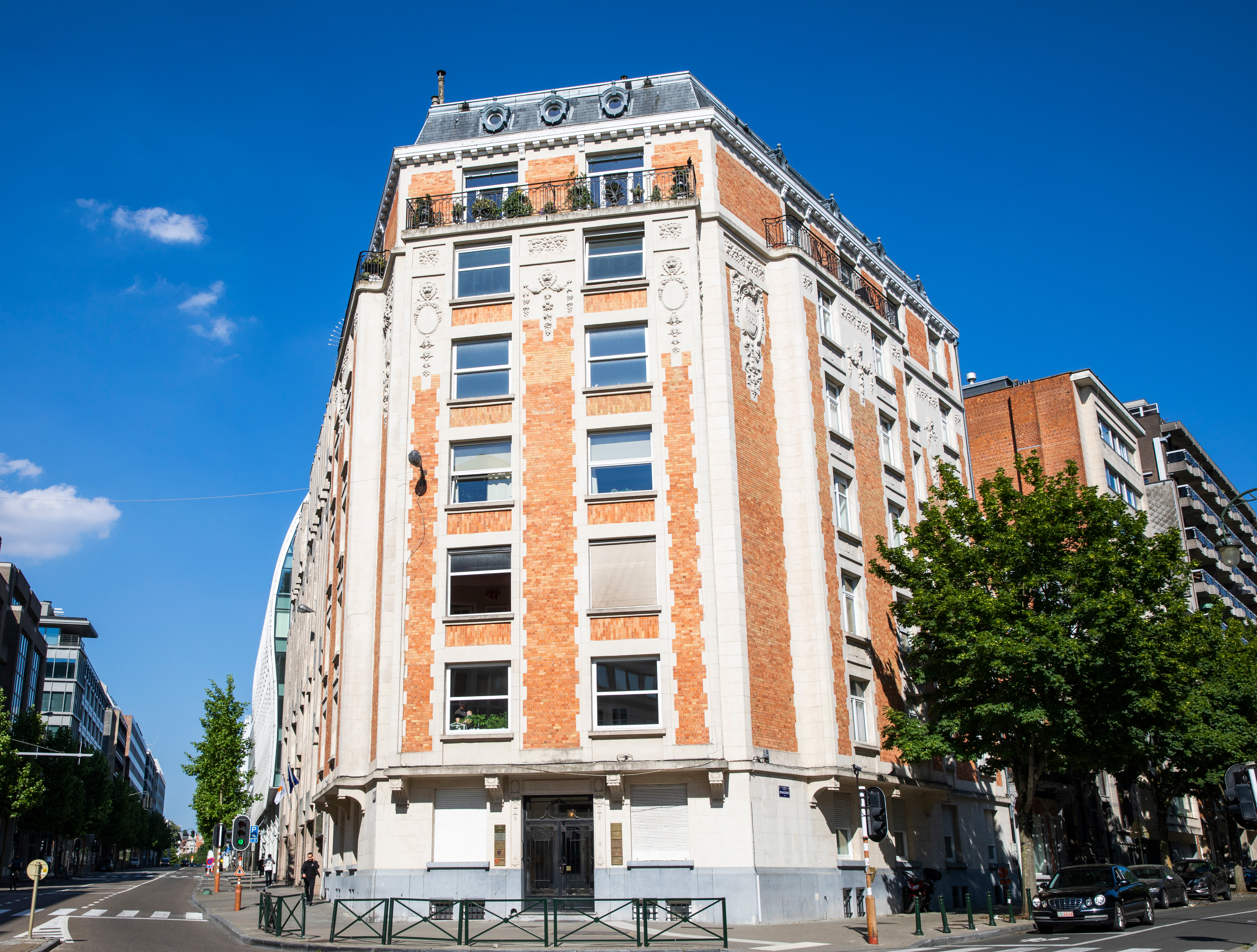
Apartment building, Avenue de Cortenbergh/Kortenberglaan 43 (1929)

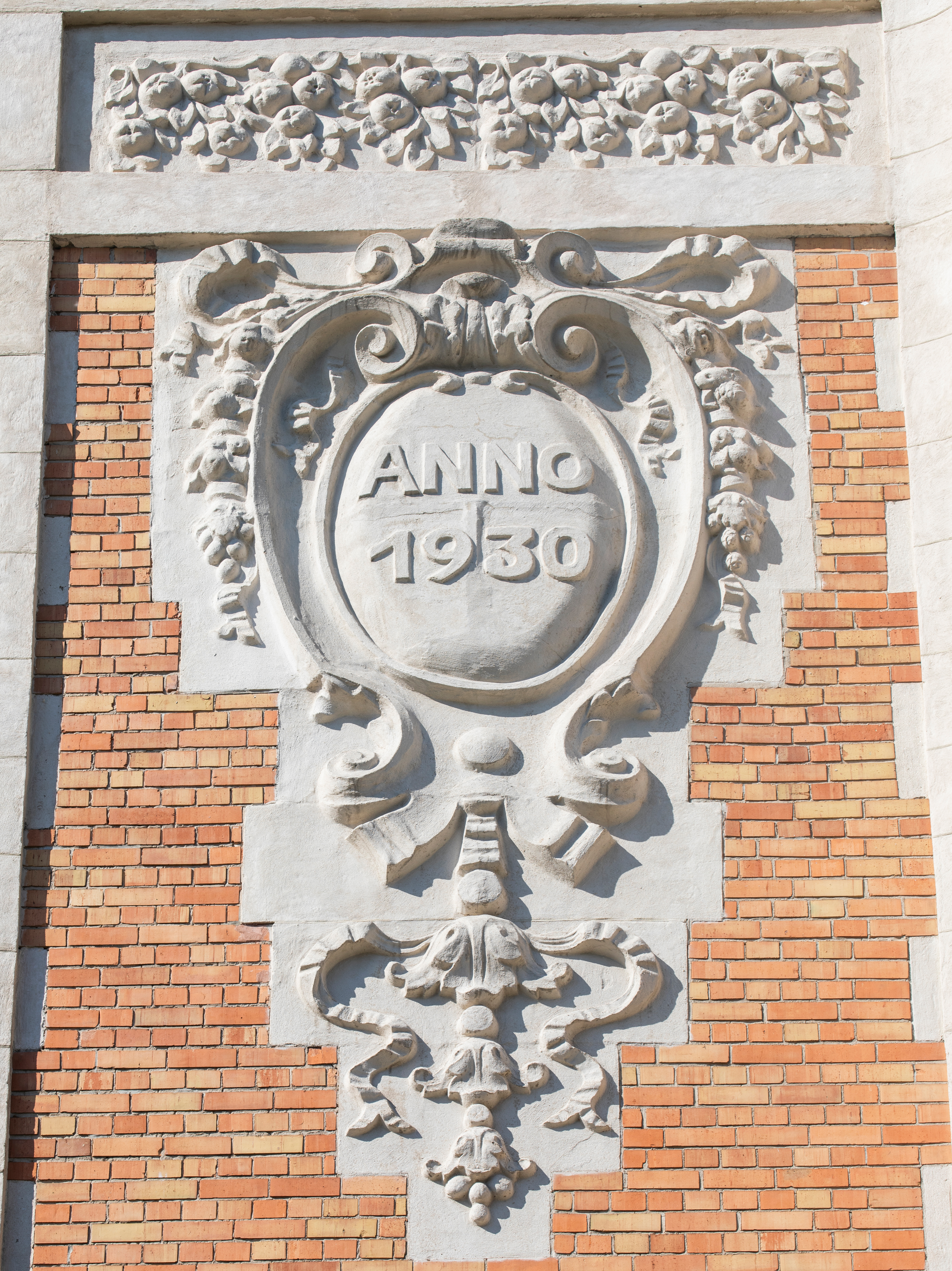
Detail of the building, Avenue de la Renaissance/Renaissancelaan

== Art Deco era ==
Starting in 1929, his style became influenced by the then dominant Art Deco style, while still keeping many Beaux-Arts elements in his works: red or orange brick facades, bordered with white stones, forged iron doors, decorative low and high reliefs, which help mitigate a coldness that is sometimes found in Art Deco buildings. He thus created his own mix of styles.

- 1929: Avenue de l'Hippodrome/Renbaanlaan 1, corner with Avenue des Klauwaerts/Klauwaartslaan 2
- 1930: Avenue Franklin Roosevelt/Franklin Rooseveltlaan 82–84, corner with Avenue de l'Orée/Zoomlaan
- 1931: Avenue Franklin Roosevelt 110, corner with Avenue des Scarabées/Keverslaan
- 1933: Avenue Louise/Louizalaan 105, corner with Rue Blanche/Blanchestraat
- 1934: Avenue Louise 142
- 1935: Avenue de la Toison d'Or/Gulden Vlieslaan 66–66a
- Rue de la Loi/Wetstraat 83
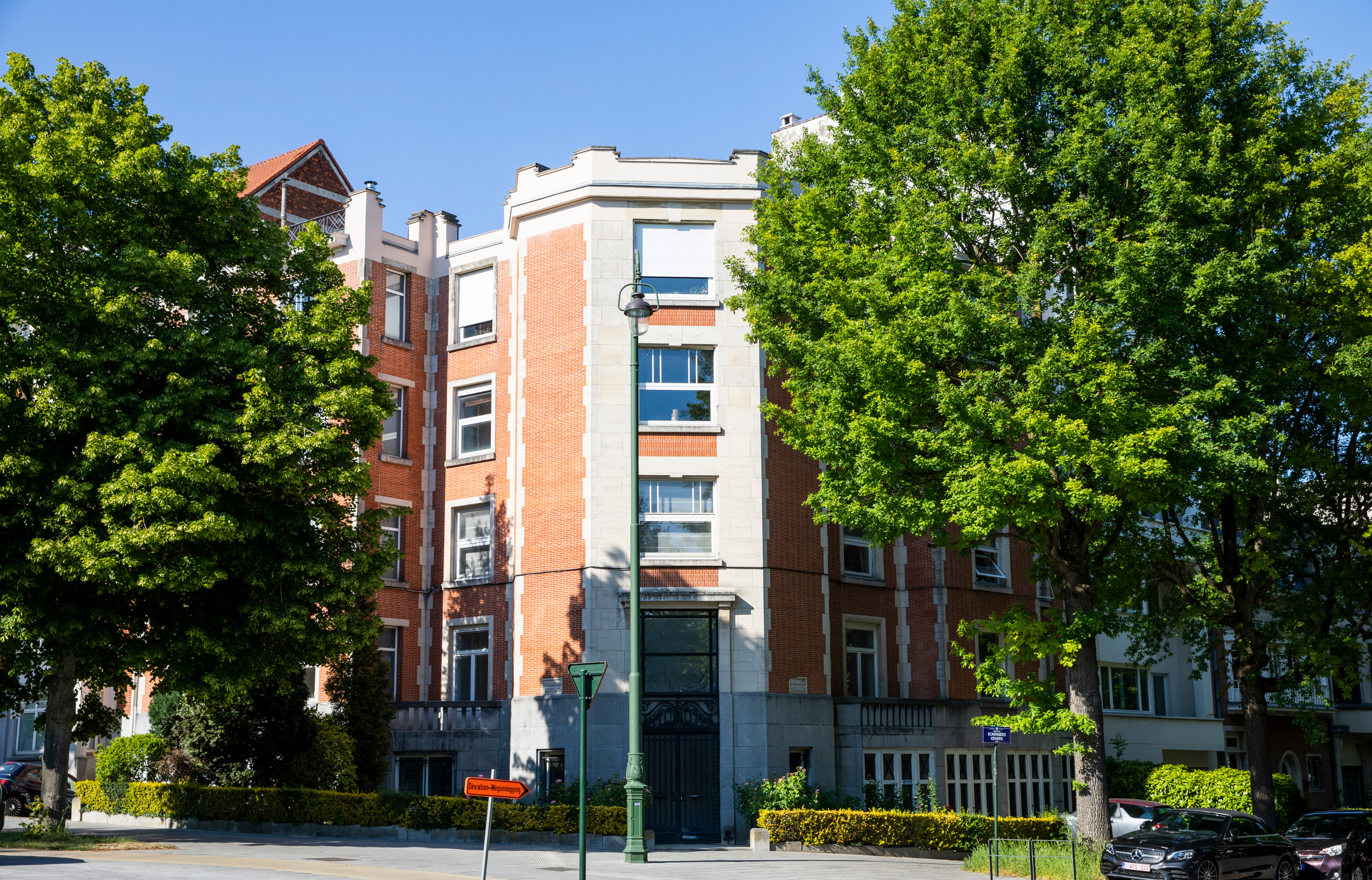
Apartment building, Avenue Franklin Roosevelt/Franklin Rooseveltlaan 110 (1931)

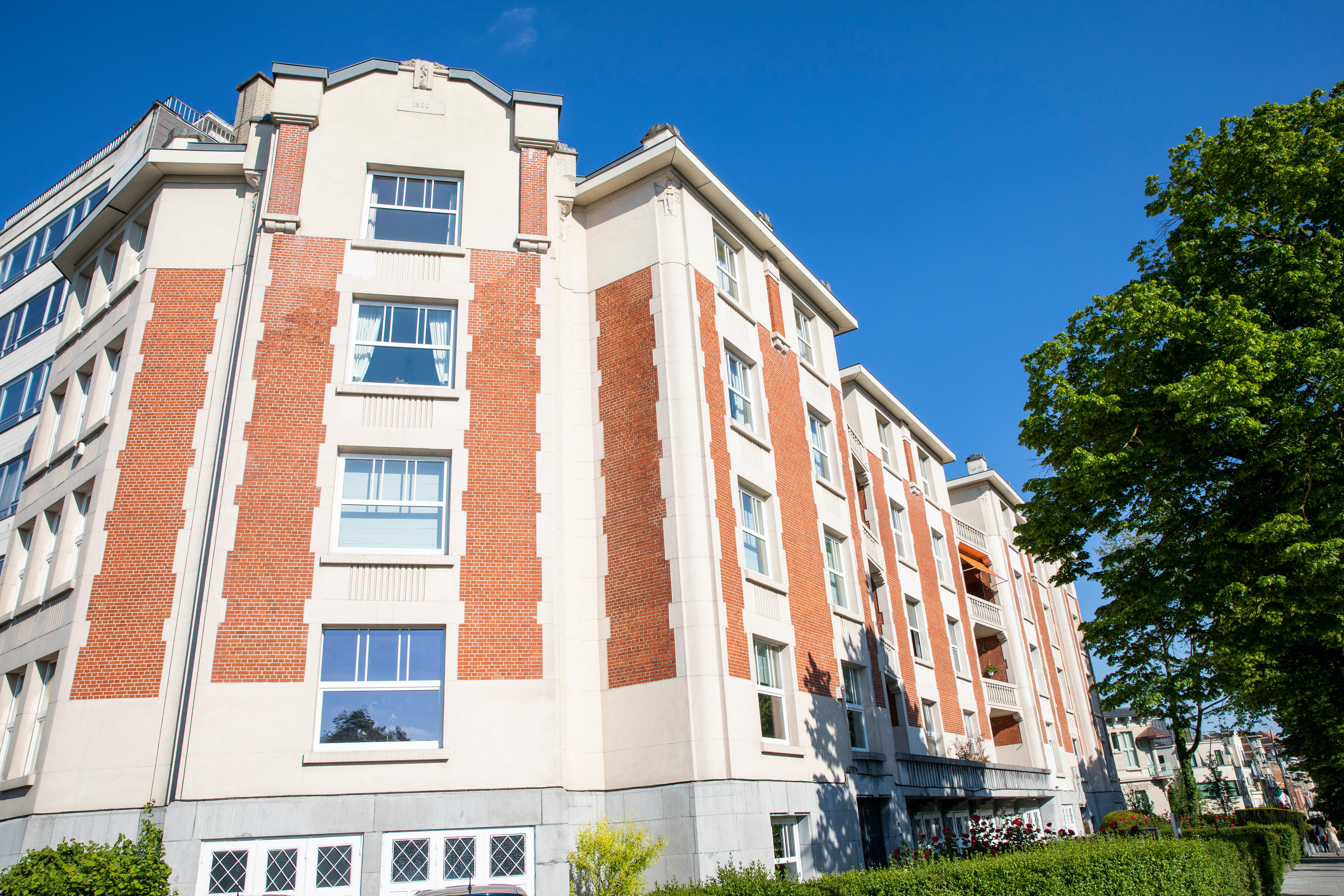
Apartment building, Avenue Franklin Roosevelt 82–84 (1930)

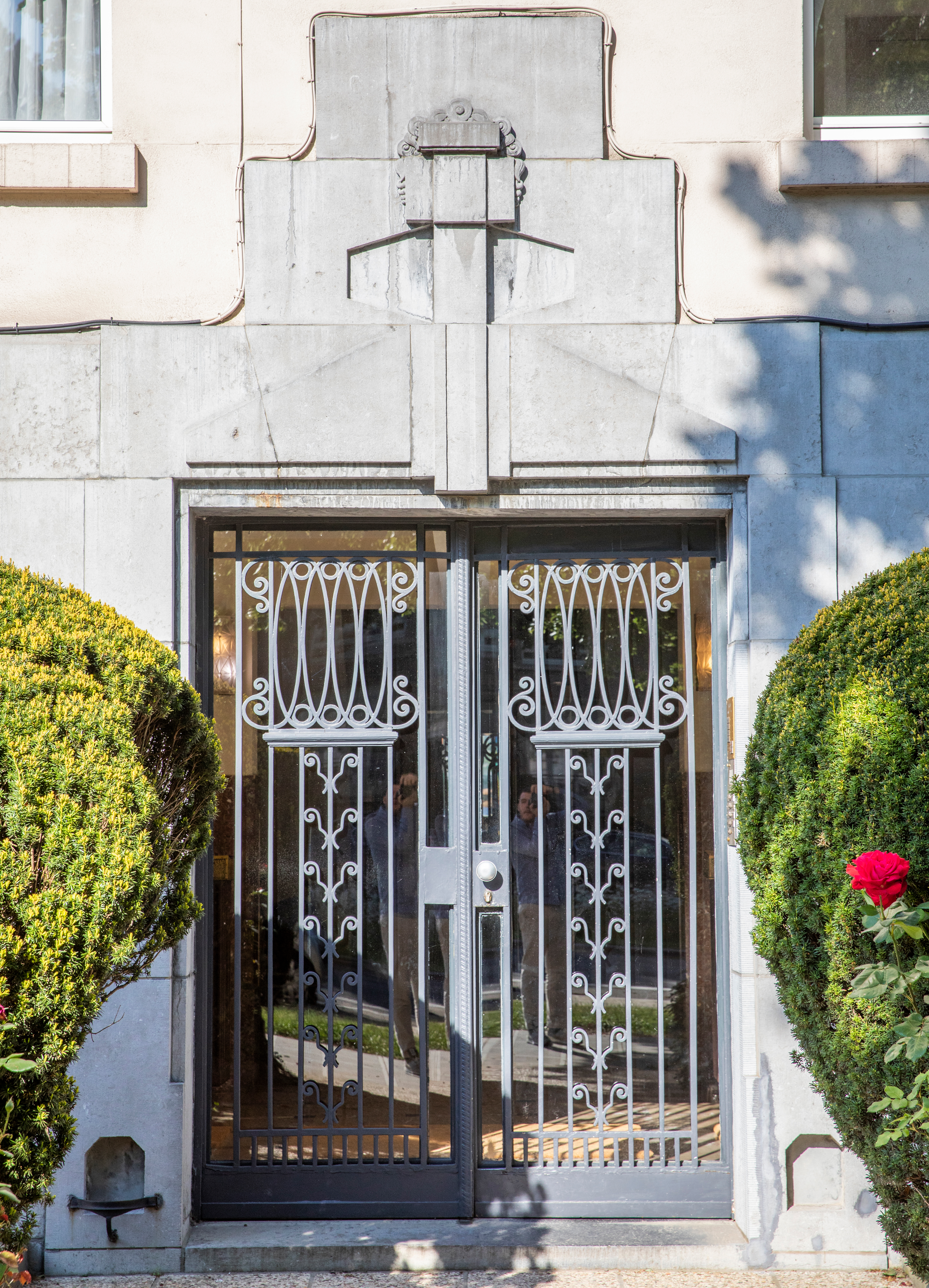
Door, Avenue Franklin Roosevelt 82–84

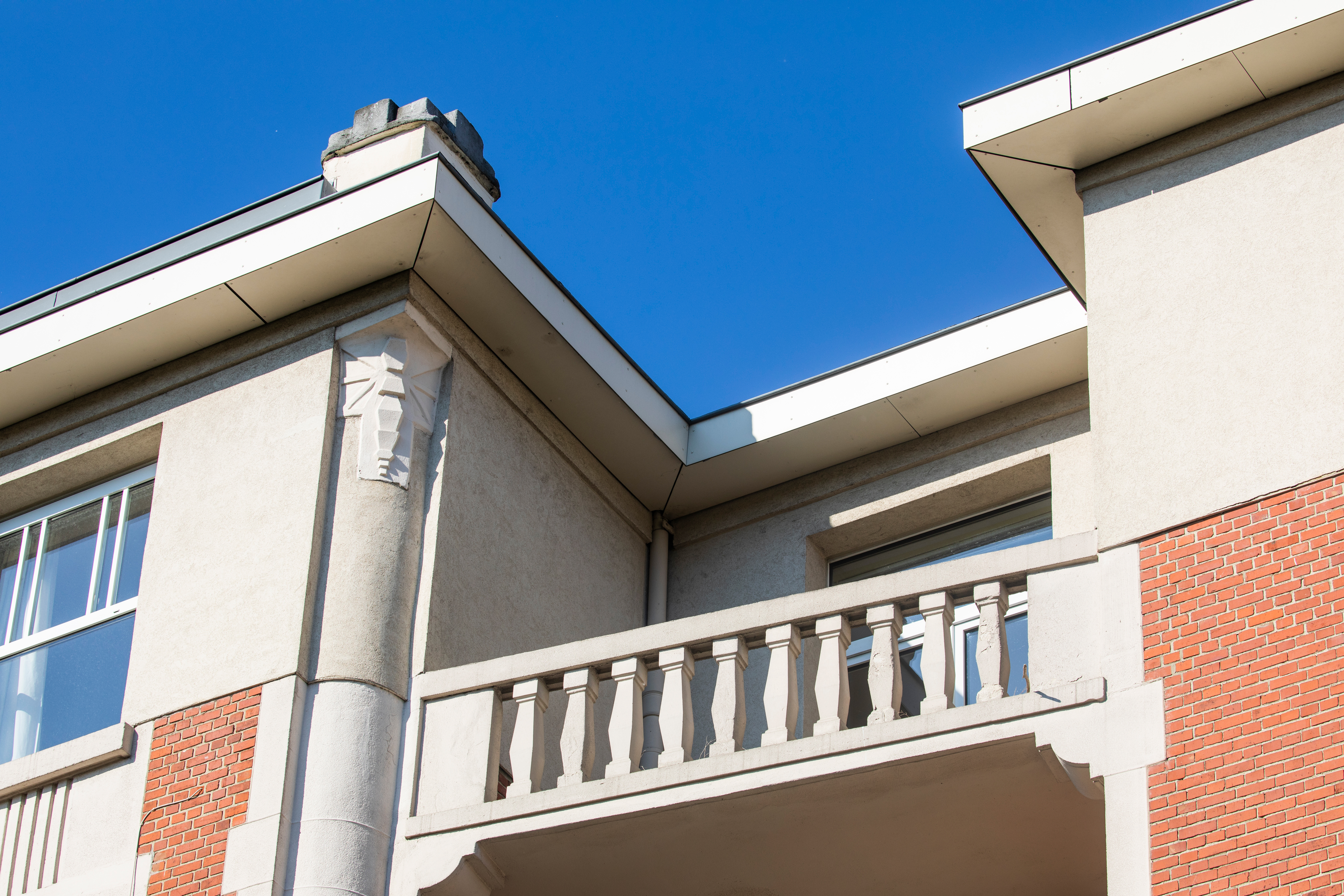
Balcony, Avenue Franklin Roosevelt 82–84

== See also ==
- List of Belgian architects
