= Lucie Dejardin =

Belgian politician

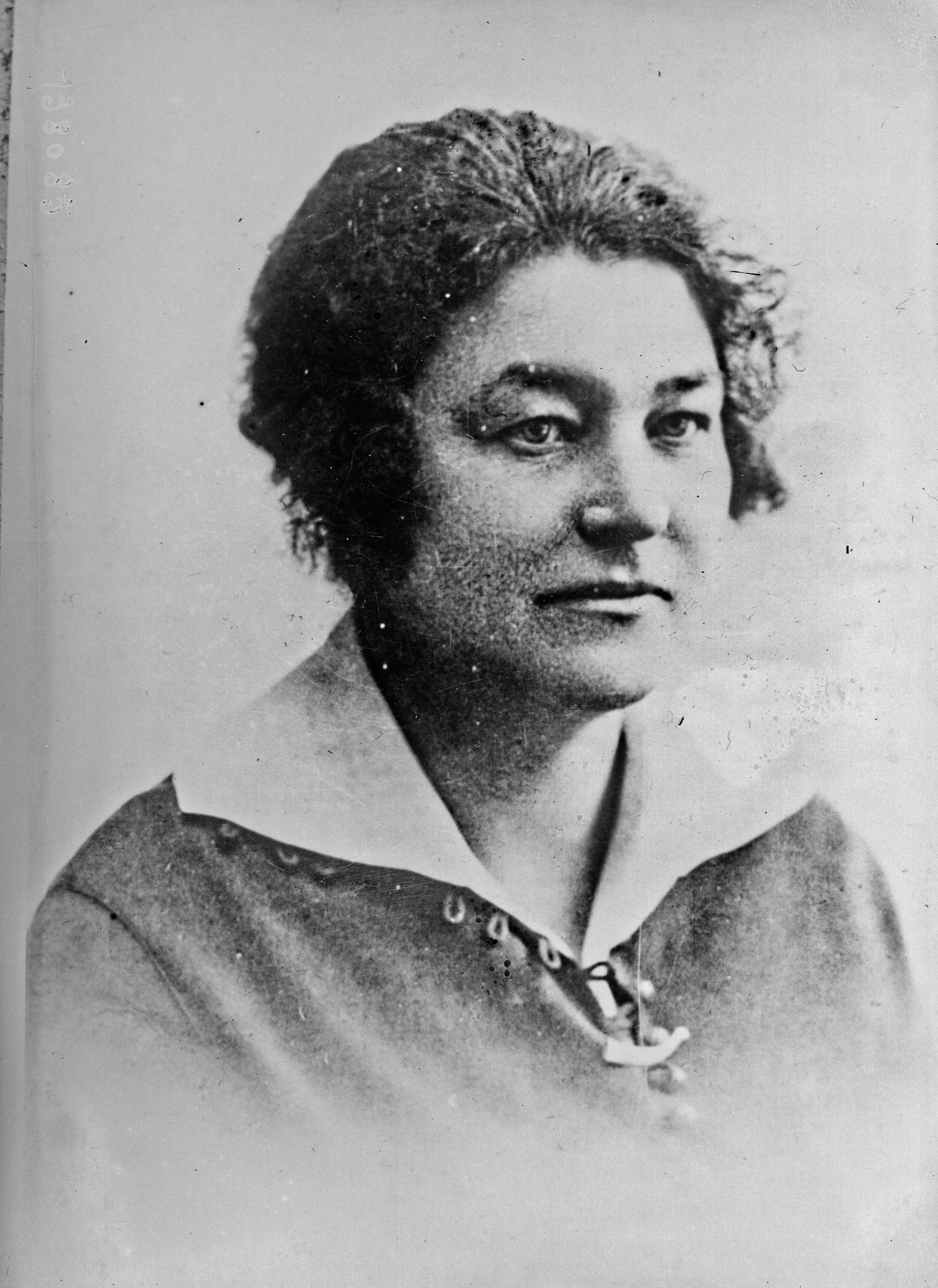
- Lucie Dejardin in 1929
- Born: 31 July 1875; Grivegnée
- Died: 28 October 1945 (aged 70); Liège
- Occupation: politician

Lucie Dejardin (French: [dəʒaʁdɛ̃]; 31 July 1875 – 28 October 1945) was a Belgian politician, the first female member of the Belgian Chamber of Representatives. She was elected under the auspices of the Belgian Workers Party to represent the district of Liège in 1929 at age 54 and served until 1936. She came from a family of miners, and had herself been a miner. Dejardin was noted primarily for her stance regarding militant trade unions.

== Biography ==
Dejardin was born into a family of miners (her mother, Marie-Rosette, gave birth to one of her ten siblings in a mine) in Grivegnée and dropped out of school at 10 years old to become work in mines and attending her first political demonstration with her brothers at age 11. One of her brothers, Joseph Dejardins, became a socialist as well. Dejardins founded the Belgian Women's International League for Peace and Freedom, was a co-founder of the Women's Socialist League, and of the feminist newspaper La Voix de la Femme.

During the German occupation of Belgium during World War I, Dejardins was part of a secret society that carried papers over enemy lines and helped to free prisoner of war. She was caught by the Germans in 1915 and sentenced to death along with six other civilians on a charge of espionage. The six others were shot in front of her on the morning of her scheduled execution; Dejardins was not executed after her sentence was commuted to indefinite imprisonment. She remained as a prisoner of war for three years in the Holzminden internment camp.

Dejardin was elected to the municipal council of Liège in 1926 as a member oft the Belgian Workers Party, and then to Belgian Chamber of Representatives in 1929. Her election to both occurred after Belgian women had gained the right of "passive" vote; they were allowed to put themselves forwards as candidates in elections, but did not achieve the right of suffrage until 1945. Dejardin was able to cast a vote due to her special status as a former political prisoner. After losing an election and the German occupation of Belgium during World War II, Dejardin fled to Great Britain in 1940 where she was involved in the war effort of caring for Belgian refugees. After the end of World War II, she returned to Belgium and ran for office again, replacing the deceased Georges Truffaut in the Chamber in 1944.

Lucie Dejardins died in Liège on 28 October 1945 of cardiac arrest.

== Legacy ==
- Lucie Dejardin Royal Athenaeum (secondary school)
