= Villa Empain =

Art Deco building in Brussels, Belgium

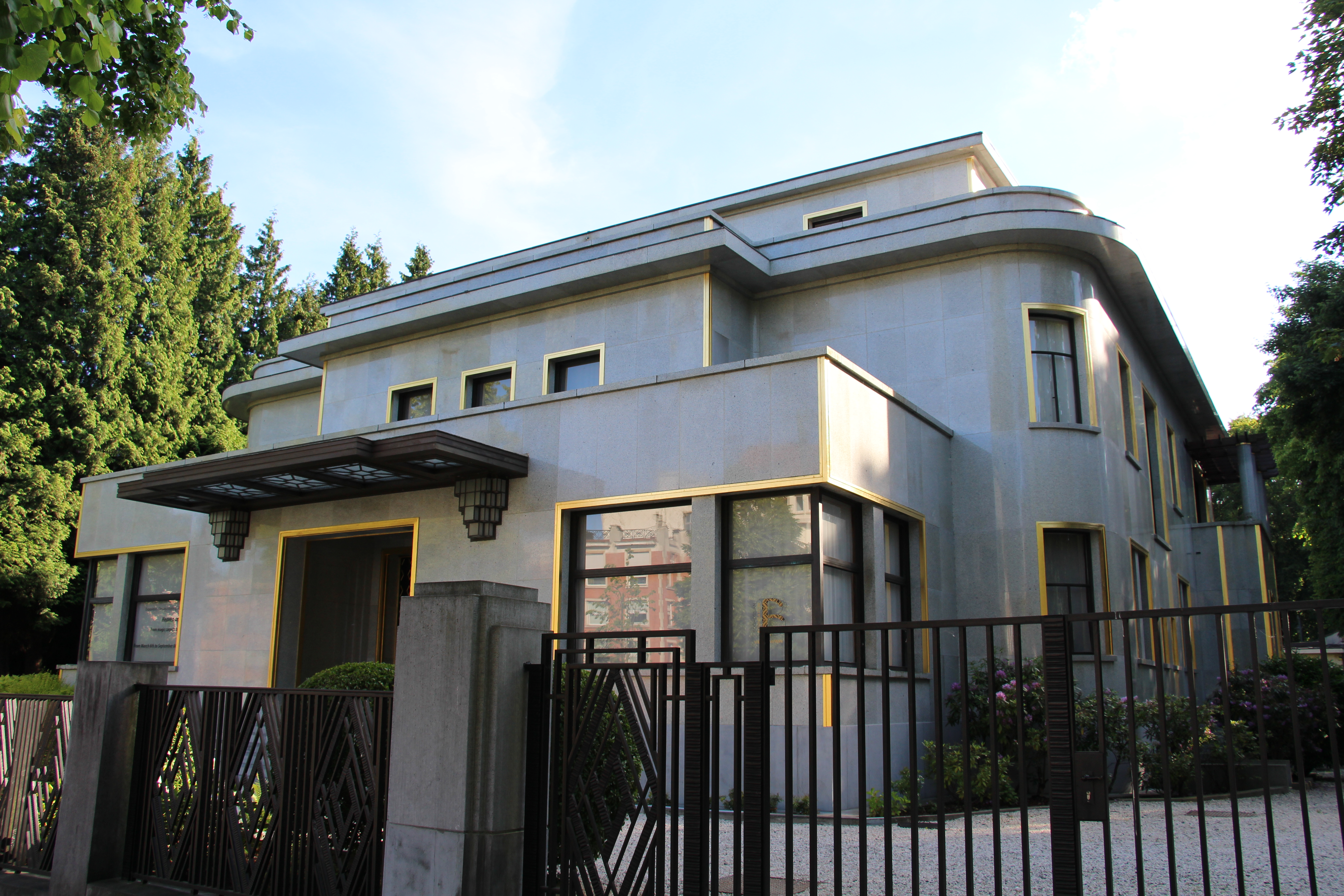
- The Villa Empain seen from the Avenue Franklin Roosevelt/Franklin Rooseveltlaan
- Alternative names: Villa Roosevelt

General information
- Type: Private house
- Architectural style: Art Deco
- Location: Avenue Franklin Roosevelt / Franklin Rooseveltlaan 67, 1050 City of Brussels, Brussels-Capital Region, Belgium
- Coordinates: 50°48′26.94″N 4°23′3.12″E
- Construction started: 1930
- Completed: 1934
- Renovated: 2009–2010
- Client: Louis Empain
- Owner: Boghossian Foundation

Technical details
- Floor area: 2,500 m^{2} (27,000 sq ft)

Design and construction
- Architect: Michel Polak

Renovating team
- Architect: Francis Metzger
- Renovating firm: Metzger et Associés Architecture

Website
- www.villaempain.com/en

The Villa Empain (French: [vi.la ɑ̃.pɛ̃]), also known as the Villa Roosevelt, is a historic house in Brussels, Belgium, which currently serves as a cultural centre and exhibition space. It was designed by the Swiss-Belgian architect Michel Polak for Baron Louis Empain, the son of the industrialist Édouard Empain, and built between 1930 and 1934, in Art Deco style. It is located at 67, avenue Franklin Roosevelt/Franklin Rooseveltlaan, bordering the Bois de la Cambre/Ter Kamerenbos.

Conceived as a luxurious private residence, the villa is notable for its monumental architecture and symmetrical composition. It features polished granite façades and high-end materials such as marble, bronze, wrought iron and precious woods. Organised around a large enclosed courtyard with a swimming pool at the back, it is considered one of the finest examples of Art Deco architecture in the city.

Shortly after its completion, Louis Empain donated the property to the Belgian state for use as a museum. Over the decades, the building served various functions, including housing the Soviet embassy after World War II and later offices for RTL Group. It fell into disuse by the late 1990s and suffered from vandalism and neglect. After a restoration in 2009–10, it was opened to the public by the Boghossian Foundation.

== History ==
=== Design and construction ===
Baron Louis Empain was the second son of Édouard Empain, a wealthy Belgian industrialist who had spent much of his career in Egypt. In 1930, Louis commissioned the Swiss-Belgian architect Michel Polak to build a large house in Art Deco style on the edge of the Bois de la Cambre/Ter Kamerenbos, in the emerging southern suburbs of Brussels, on what was then known as the Avenue des Nations/Natiënlaan (now the Avenue Franklin Roosevelt/Franklin Rooseveltlaan).

Built between 1930 and 1934, the Villa Empain is organised around a large enclosed courtyard featuring a swimming pool at the back. The Art Deco project aroused significant interest in Belgium where prestigious houses in the style were comparatively rare. Various expensive stone facings were used from around the world.

=== Later history ===
Despite the expense incurred in construction, Louis Empain barely used the house after its completion and lived primarily in Canada. In 1937, it was donated to the Belgian state to house a museum of applied arts for the École nationale supérieure d'Architecture et des Arts décoratifs de La Cambre. It was requisitioned by the German Army in November 1943 during the occupation.

After the war, the Villa Empain was ceded to the Soviet Union as an embassy at the initiative of Paul-Henri Spaak. Disapproving of this use, it was reacquired by the Empain family in 1963 and resold in 1973 to Harry Tcherkezian, an Armenian-American tobacco entrepreneur. It was used by Radio-Télévision-Luxembourg (RTL) from 1980 to 1993, before becoming unoccupied after 1995. The building was classified in 2007, but its condition degraded significantly. During illegal raves, the building's marble walls were marked with graffiti, and various items were removed, including radiator grilles and a decorative fish from the bar's fountain.

In 2007, the Villa Empain was acquired by the Boghossian Foundation. It was restored between 2009 and 2010 by the architect Francis Metzger, from the architectural office MA² - Metzger et Associés Architecture, and reopened to the public as a museum and cultural centre. The conservation project was awarded the European Union Prize for Cultural Heritage / Europa Nostra Award in 2011.

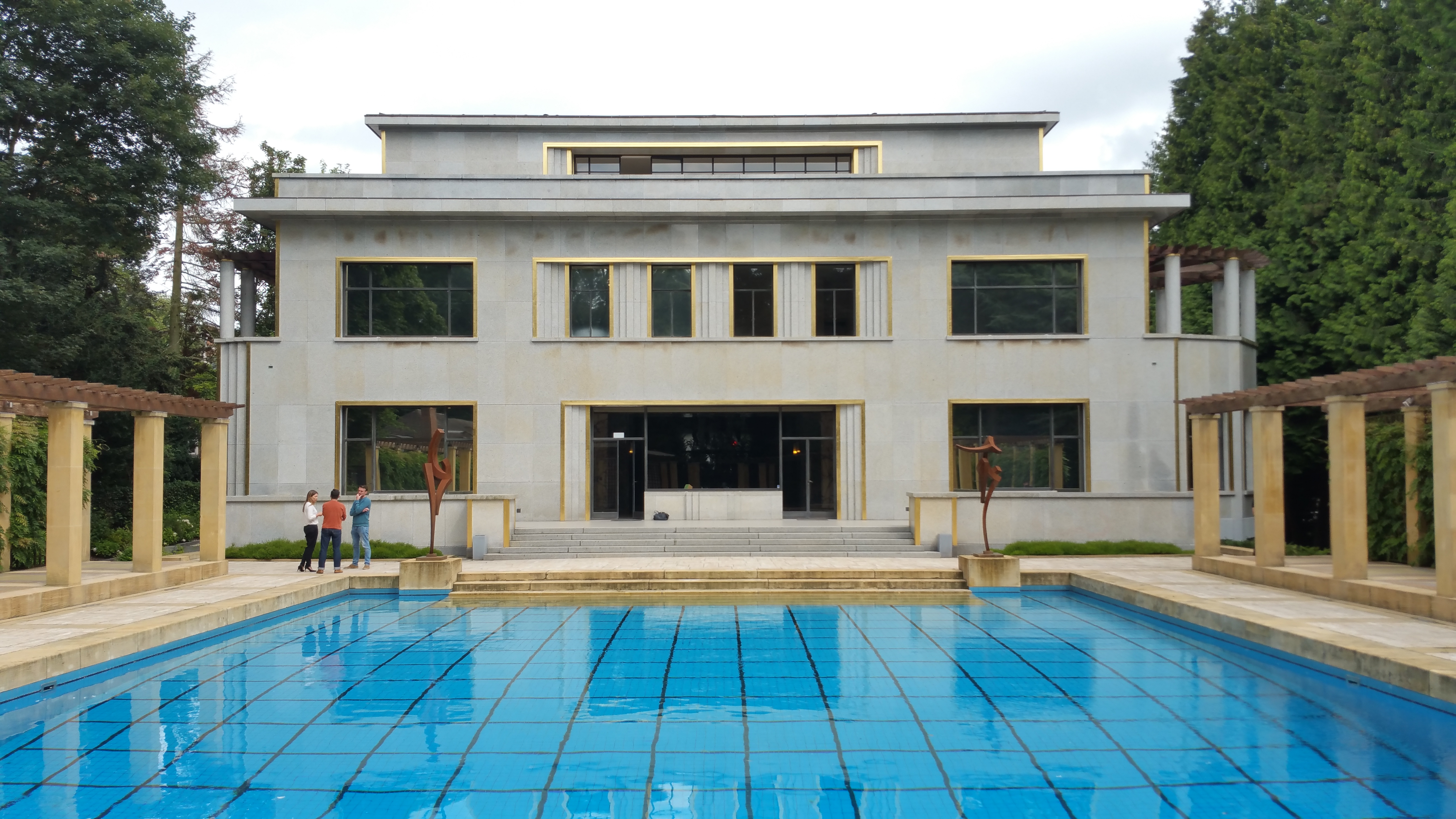
Rear of the Villa Empain, showing the large original swimming pool

Entrance

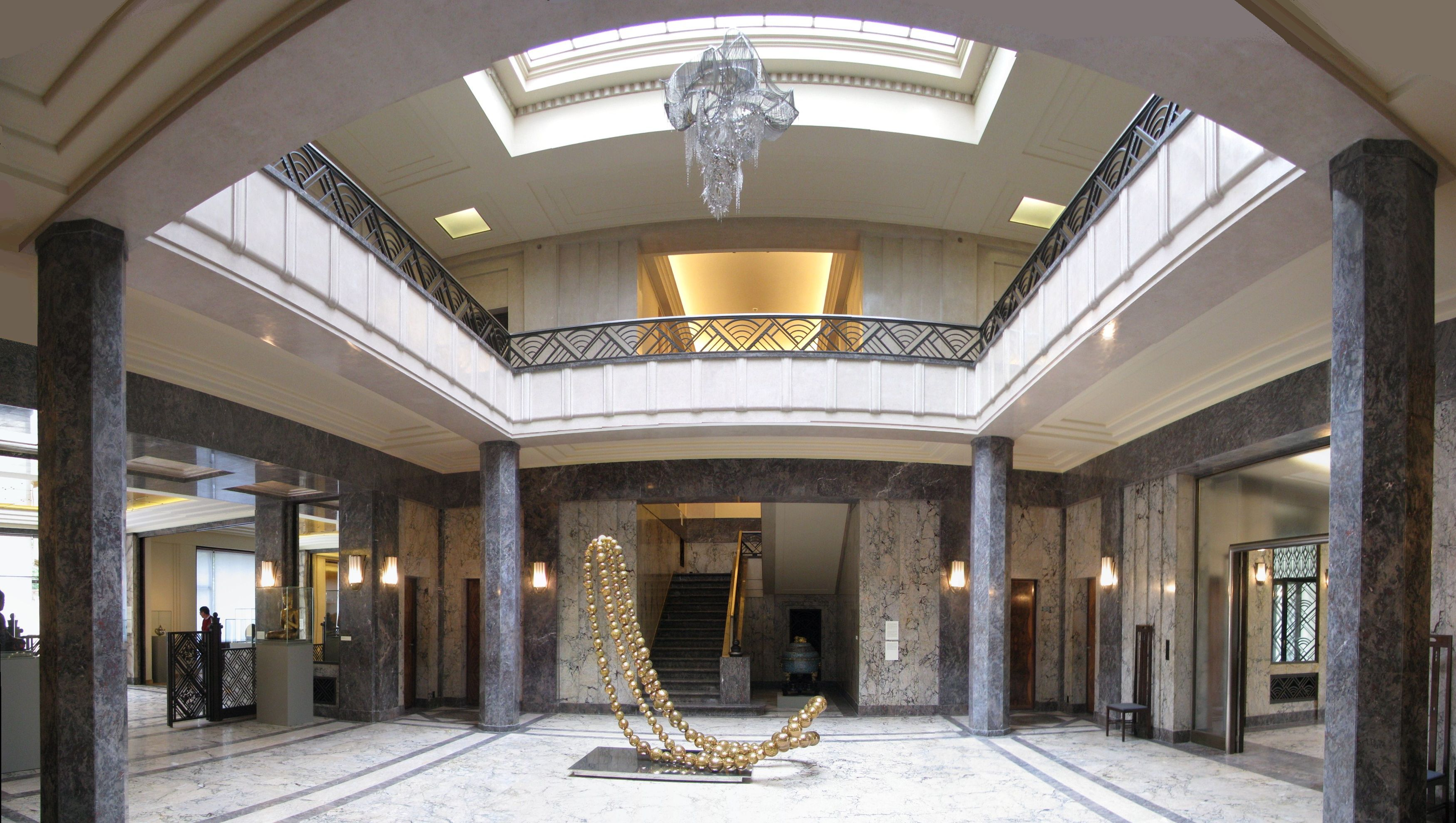
Main hall

== See also ==
- Stoclet Palace
- List of museums in Brussels
- Art Deco in Brussels
- History of Brussels
- Culture of Belgium
