= Louis Empain =

Belgian financier

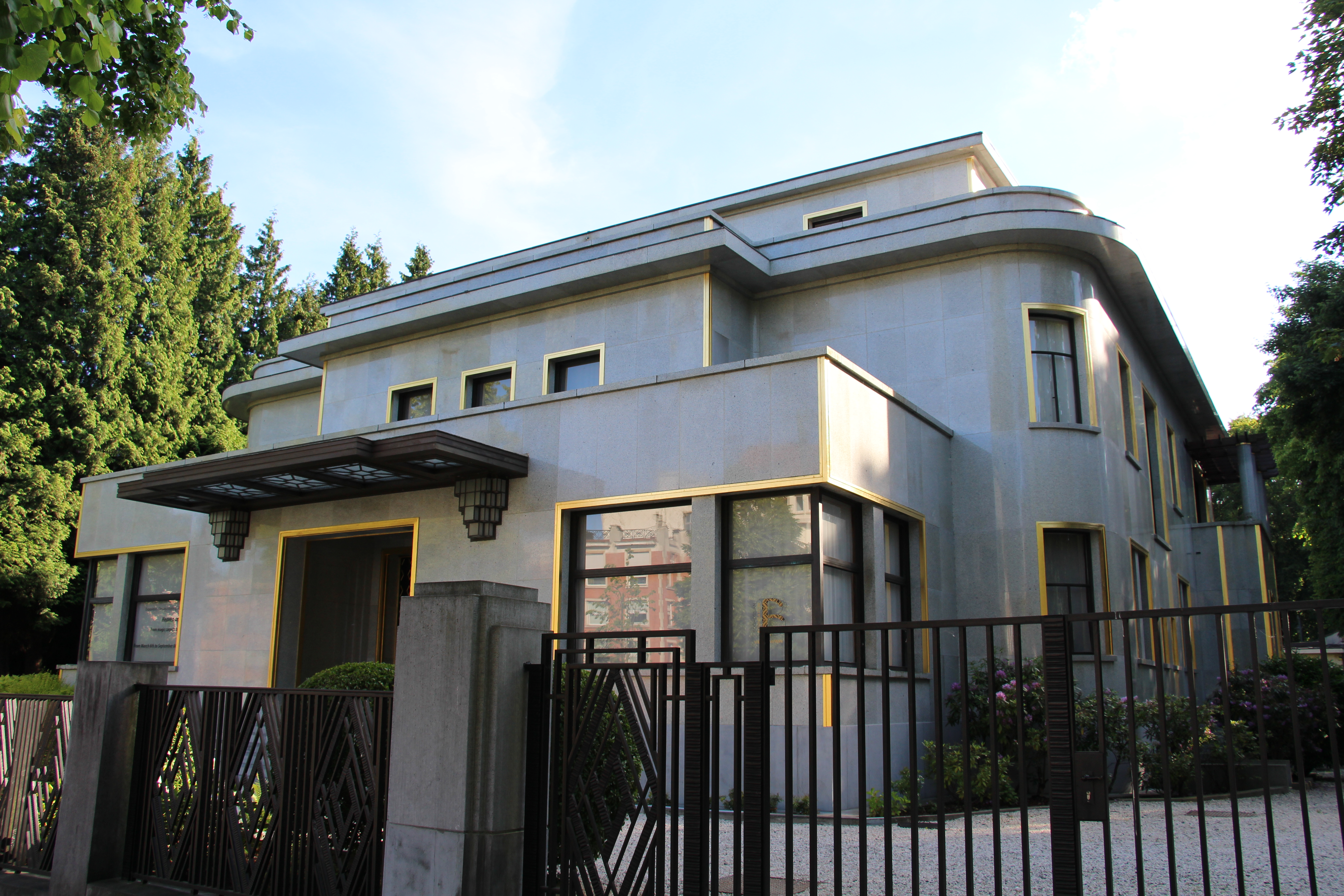
A modern view of the Villa Empain in Brussels, built 1930–1934

Baron Louis Empain, originally Louis Becker (1908–1976) was a Belgian financier.

Louis was born in Brussels on 3 January 1908, the youngest son of Édouard Empain, by his mistress Jeanne Becker, a musician. When his mother became Empain's wife in 1921, Louis was legitimised and took his father's surname. Evacuated to Le Havre during the First World War, he spent several years of his childhood in France and England. He studied mathematics at the University of Paris, but his main activities were music, riding, fencing and hiking. His father's dying wish was that he would become involved in running the family business, with its interests in tramways, electrification, chemicals and colonial trade. He and his older brother, Jean, ran the holding company together, with Louis inheriting the family property in France and Jean the property in Belgium. Louis promoted social entrepreneurship, encouraging paid holidays and social insurance for the workers in the companies owned by the group, which were not always approved by the boards, and insisting that the company pay its taxes and social contributions in full, rather than seek loopholes to minimise tax exposure. This led to a rupture with his brother, and in 1934 Louis established the Banque Belge pour l'Industrie (BBI) to promote his own position in the companies in which he had a stake.

In 1930—1934 he had the Villa Empain built in Brussels, combining Art Deco and Bauhaus influences. He gave the villa to the Belgian state in 1937, to house a museum of applied art. In the mid-1930s Empain took a particular interest in Canadian investments, setting up the holding Compagnie Belgo-Canadienne de Crédit Limité to coordinate a network of interests in Quebec, including real estate, agriculture, prospecting, winter sports, tourism and trade.

After a yachting accident in July 1936 he vowed to change his style of life, selling two castles, renouncing the title of baron, and heavily contributing to the establishment of a youth organisation, modelled on the Swiss Pro Juventute, with the aim of improving the health and education of the young, particularly through sport and outdoor activities, without regard to any distinctions of class, race or religion. In 1938 he married Geneviève Hone, from Quebec. He died in Uccle (Brussels) on 30 May 1976.
