= Avenue Franklin Roosevelt =

Thoroughfare in Brussels, Belgium

Avenue Franklin Roosevelt (French); Franklin Rooseveltlaan (Dutch)
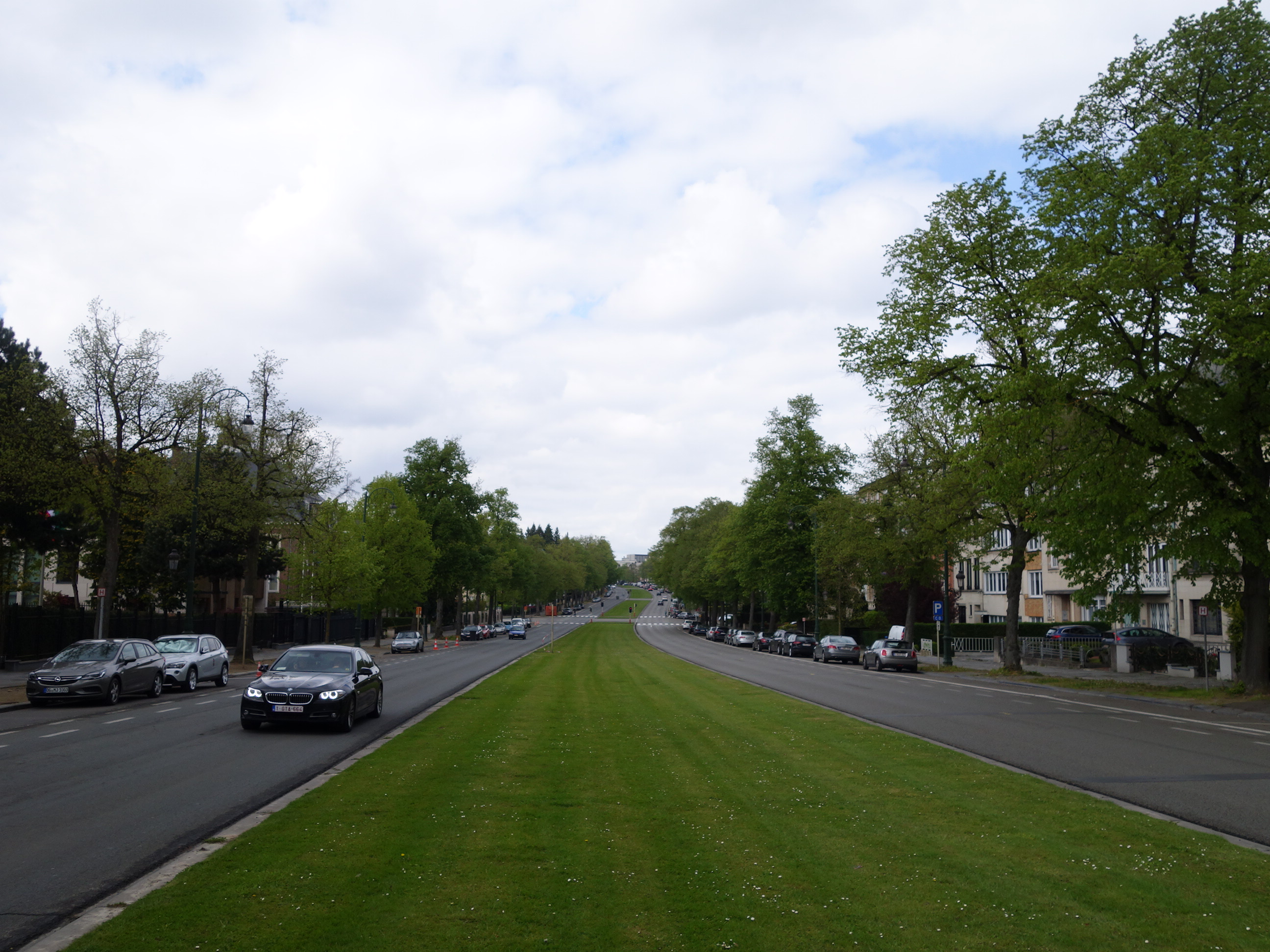
- The Avenue Franklin Roosevelt/Franklin Rooseveltlaan in Brussels

- Location within Brussels Location within Belgium
- Former names: Avenue des Nations (French); Natiënlaan (Dutch)
- Namesake: Franklin Delano Roosevelt
- Type: Avenue
- Location: City of Brussels, Brussels-Capital Region, Belgium
- Postal code: 1050
- Coordinates: 50°48′23″N 04°23′08″E

Construction
- Construction start: 1922

The Avenue Franklin Roosevelt (French, pronounced [avny fʁɑ̃klɛ̃ ʁuz(ə)vɛlt]) or Franklin Rooseveltlaan (Dutch, pronounced [ˈfrɛŋklɪn ˈroːzəvɛltˌlaːn]) is a major thoroughfare in Brussels, Belgium. It is located in the southern part of the City of Brussels, near the border with the municipality of Ixelles, where it runs parallel to the Bois de la Cambre/Ter Kamerenbos. It is named in honour of the 32nd president of the United States, Franklin Delano Roosevelt.

The Avenue Franklin Roosevelt is known as one of the most beautiful avenues in Brussels. Many of the houses on the avenue date from the interwar period. It also houses many embassies and residences of ambassadors.

== History ==
The avenue was laid out in 1922, according to the wishes of King Leopold II, through the site of the Brussels International Exposition of 1910. The construction of the avenue, the adjacent arteries and the first buildings mostly took place during the interwar period. Before 1945, it was called the Avenue des Nations/Natiënlaan ("Nations Avenue"). Its name was then changed to the Avenue Franklin Roosevelt/Franklin Rooseveltlaan in honour of the 32nd president of the United States, Franklin Delano Roosevelt.

In spite of Brussels' city planning free-for-all between the end of the Second World War and the late 1970s, the appearance of the Avenue Franklin Roosevelt has largely remained unchanged over time; the vast majority of its buildings are very well preserved, and some of them are now classified as historic monuments.

== Notable buildings ==
The Avenue Franklin Roosevelt is home to many buildings in Art Nouveau, Art Deco, modernist and eclectic styles. The Solbosch/Solbos campus of the Université libre de Bruxelles (ULB), a French-speaking university, with about 20,000 students, is also situated on the Avenue Franklin Roosevelt.

- No. 52: Blomme House (1928), a modernist house designed by Adrien Blomme for his personal use (offices and apartments), whose entrance is flanked by two bas-reliefs by Ossip Zadkine.
- No. 65: Villa Bernheim, which was occupied by Émile Bernheim, former President of the group À L'Innovation and is now an art gallery.
- No. 67: Villa Empain (1930–1934), a private Art Deco house by Michel Polak, notable as the home of the Boghossian Foundation.
- No. 86: Delune House (1904), an eclectic building combining Art Nouveau with influences from Byzantine architecture, by Léon Delune.
- No. 110: Art Deco apartment building (1931) by Antoine Varlet
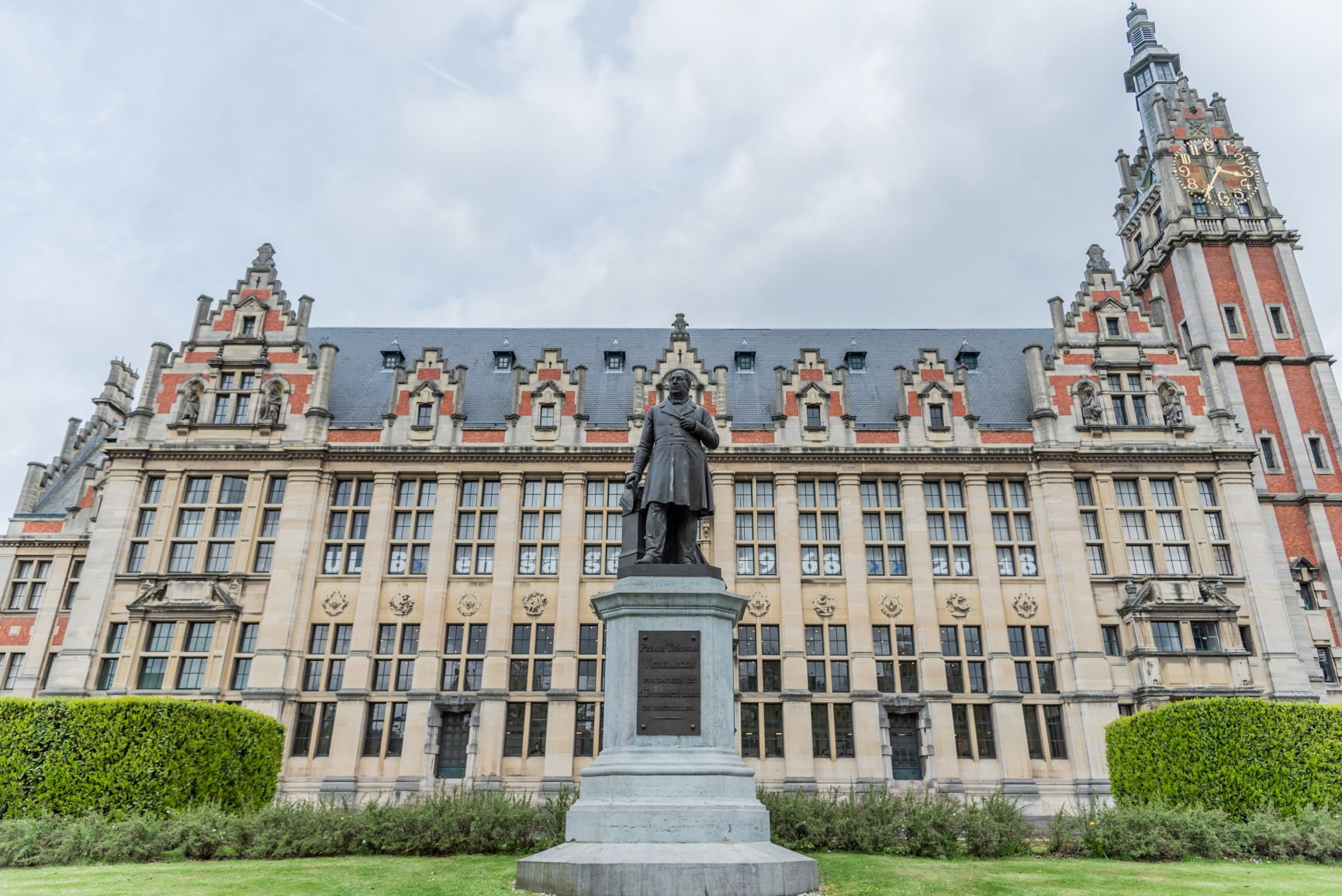
The main building on the Solbosch/Solbos campus of the Université libre de Bruxelles

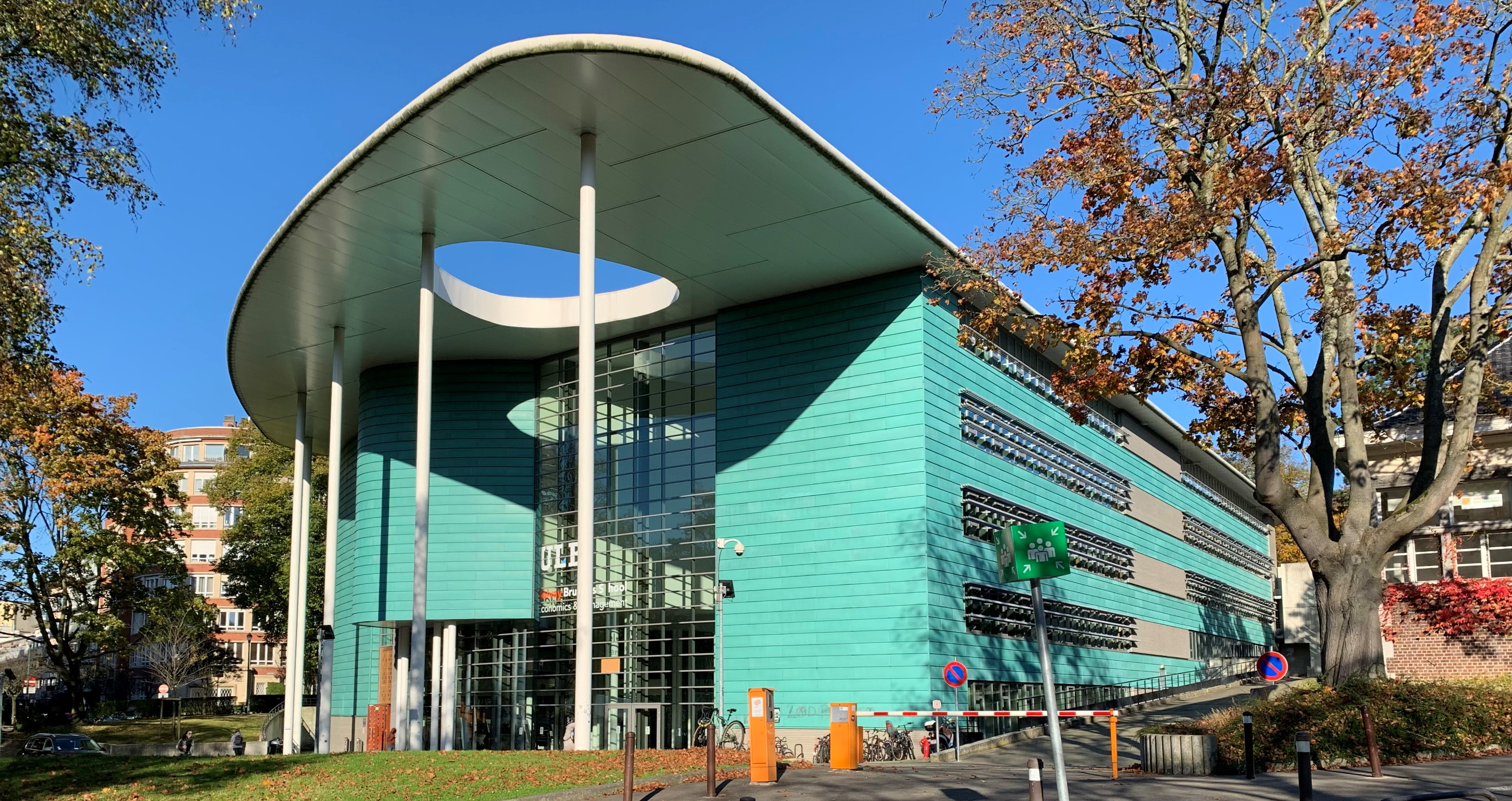
Solvay Brussels School of Economics and Management (2010)

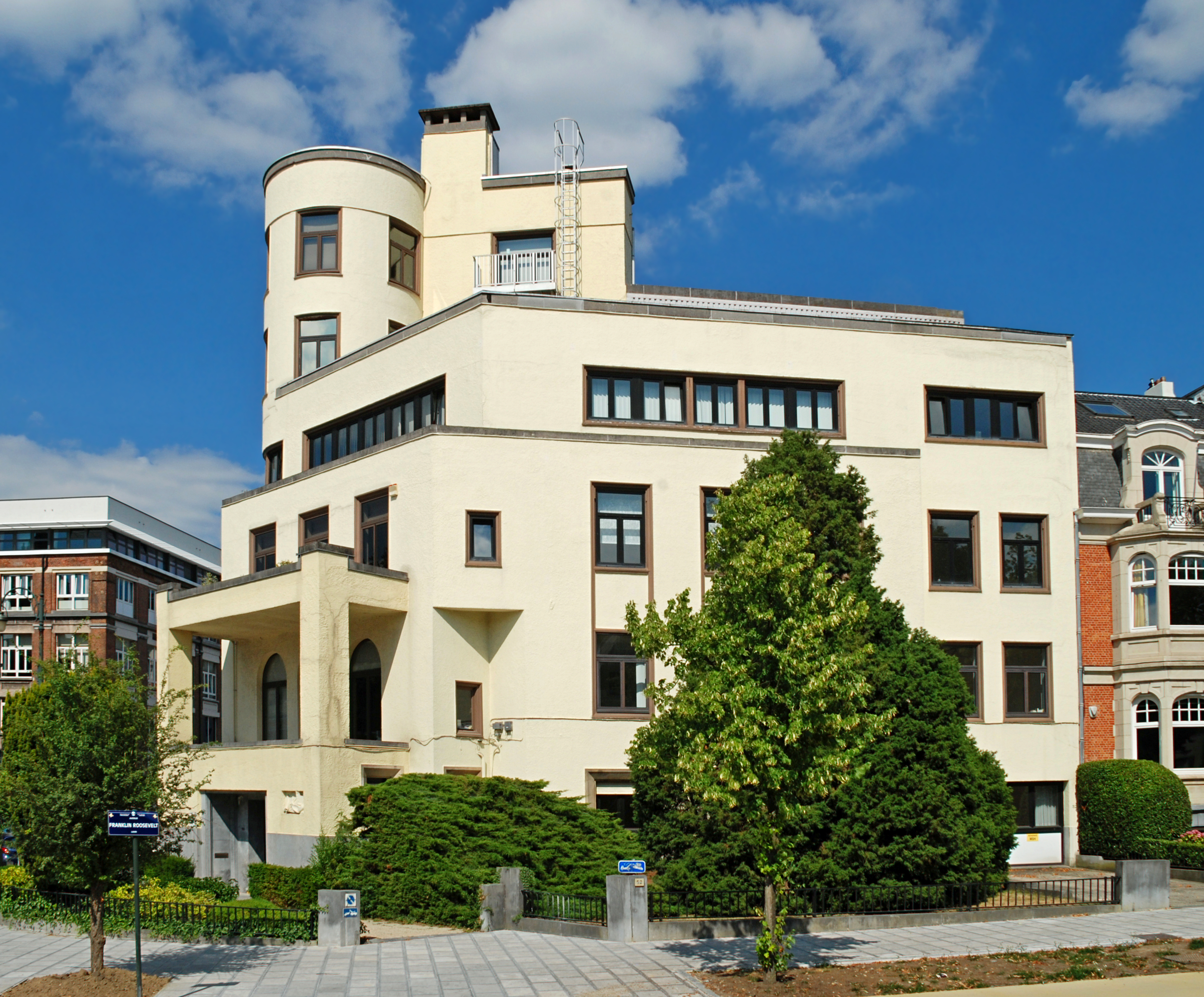
Blomme House (Blomme, 1928)

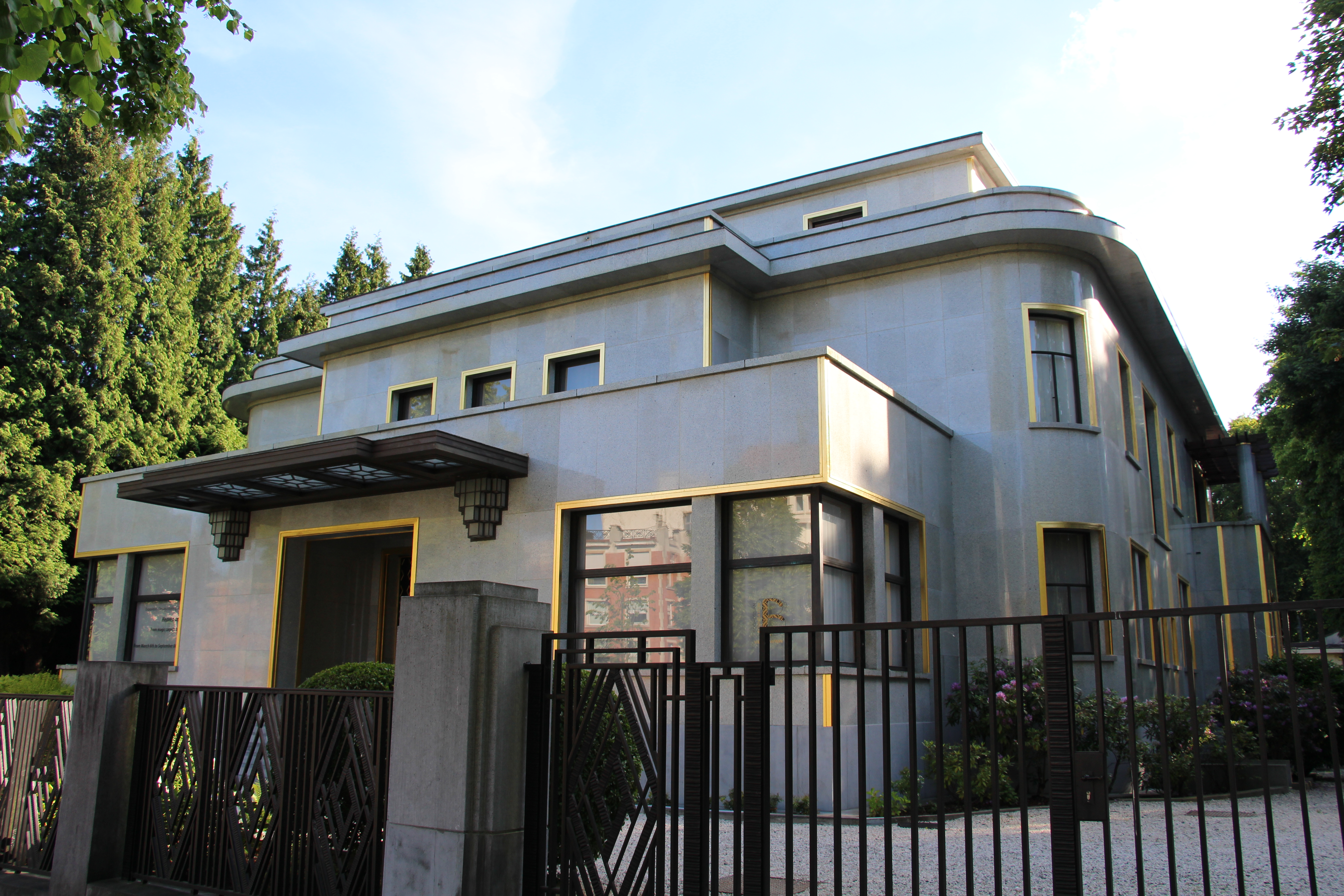
Villa Empain (Polak, 1930–1934)

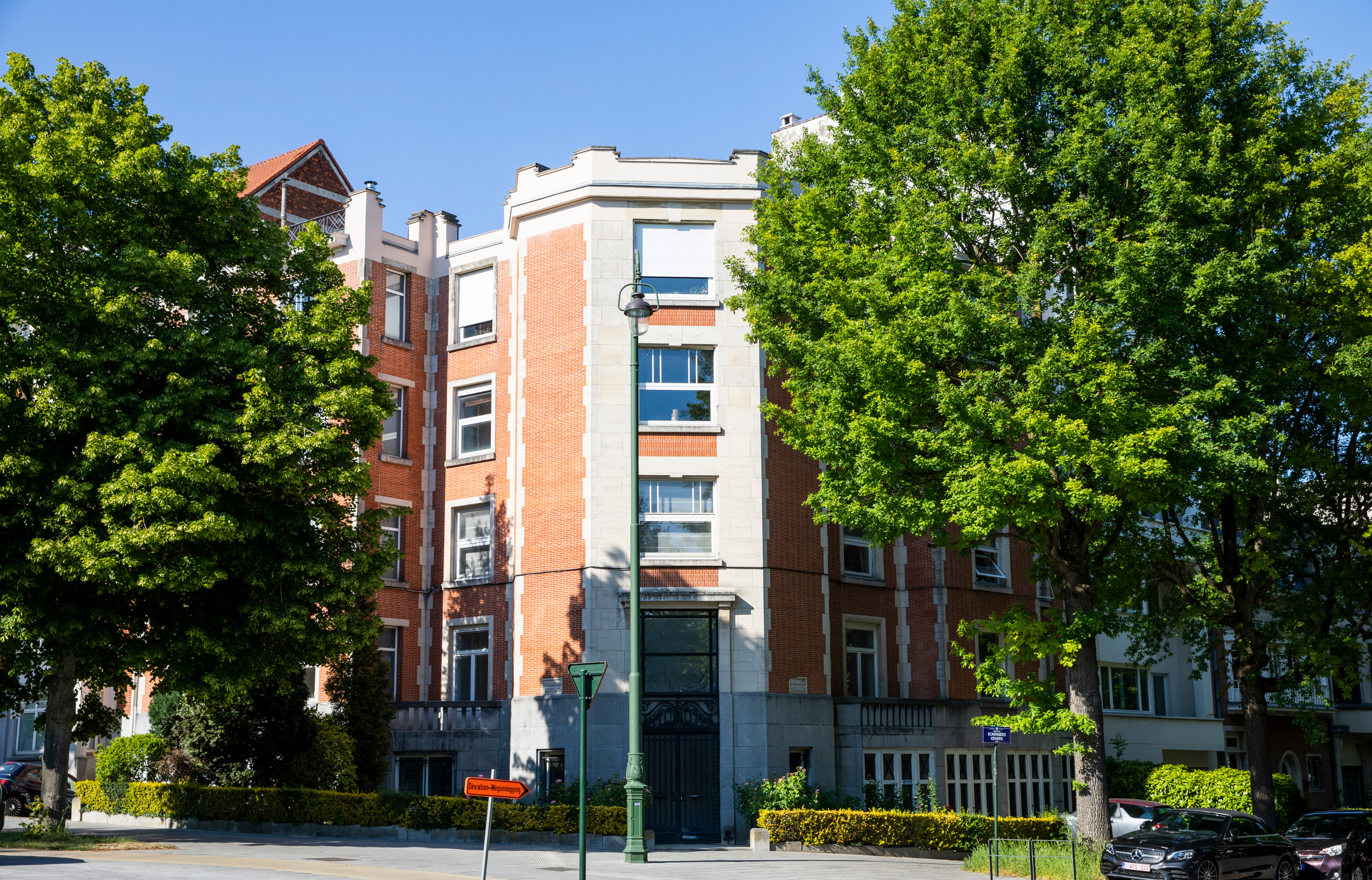
Apartment building (Varlet, 1931)

== Embassies and consulates ==
The Avenue Franklin Roosevelt houses many embassies, including from the City of Brussels towards Watermael-Boitsfort:

- Morocco
- Republic of the Congo
- Kuwait
- Niger
- Moldova
- Mexico
- Colombia
- Jordan
- Canada
- Qatar
- Singapore
- Uzbekistan
- Lebanon
- Djibouti
- Iran
- Iraq
- Kurdistan
- Ivory Coast
- Oman
- Brunei
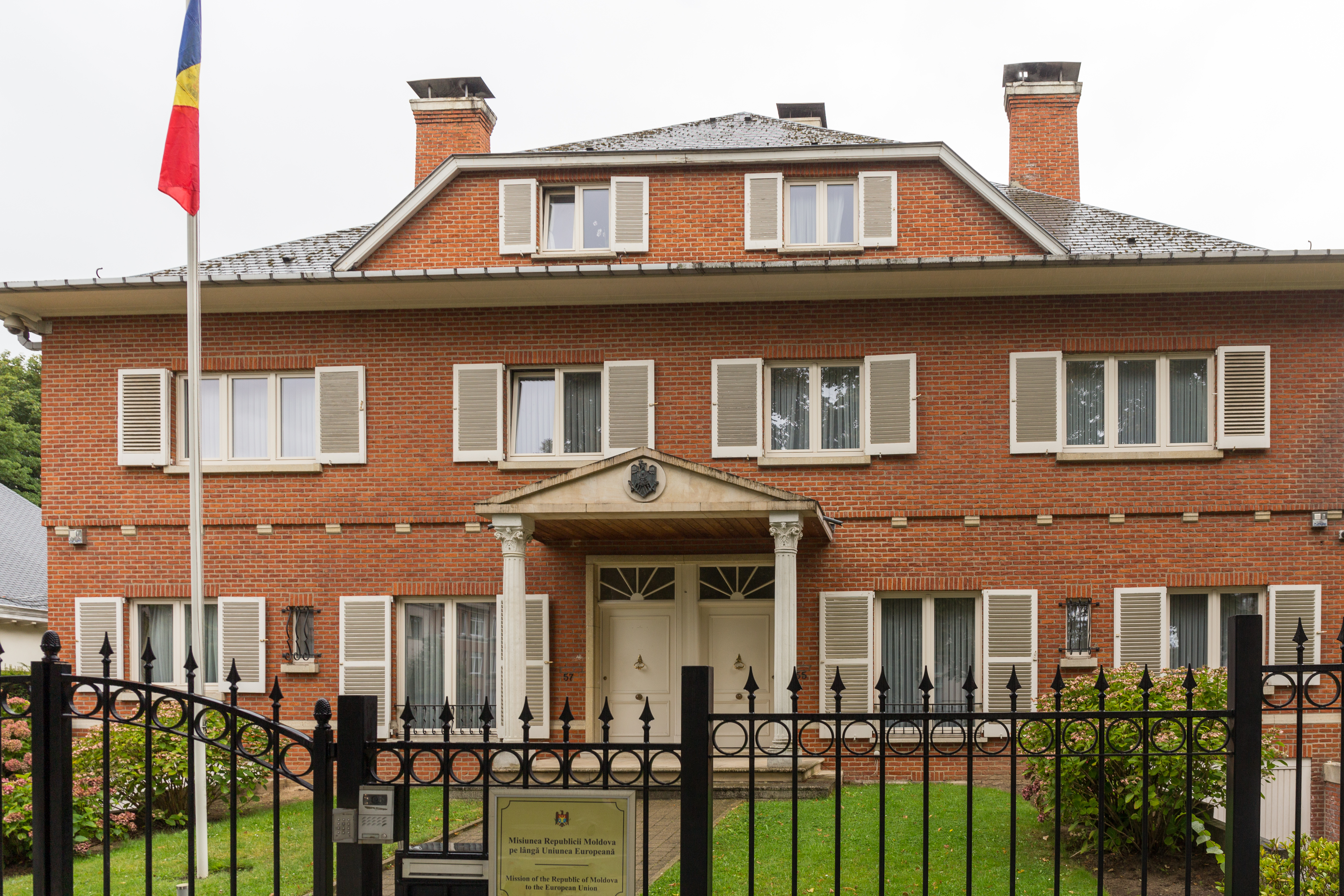
Embassy of Moldova

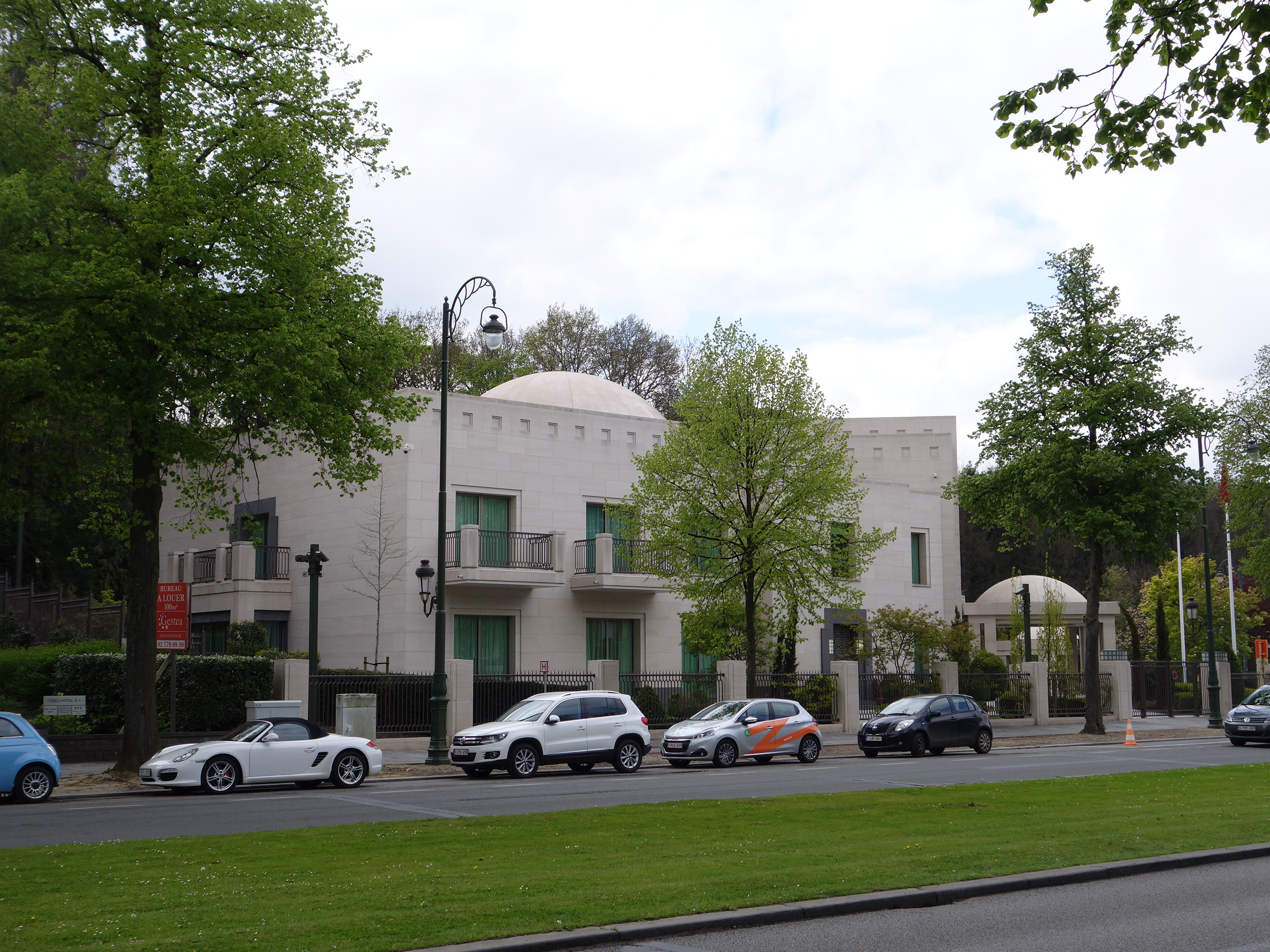
Embassy of Qatar

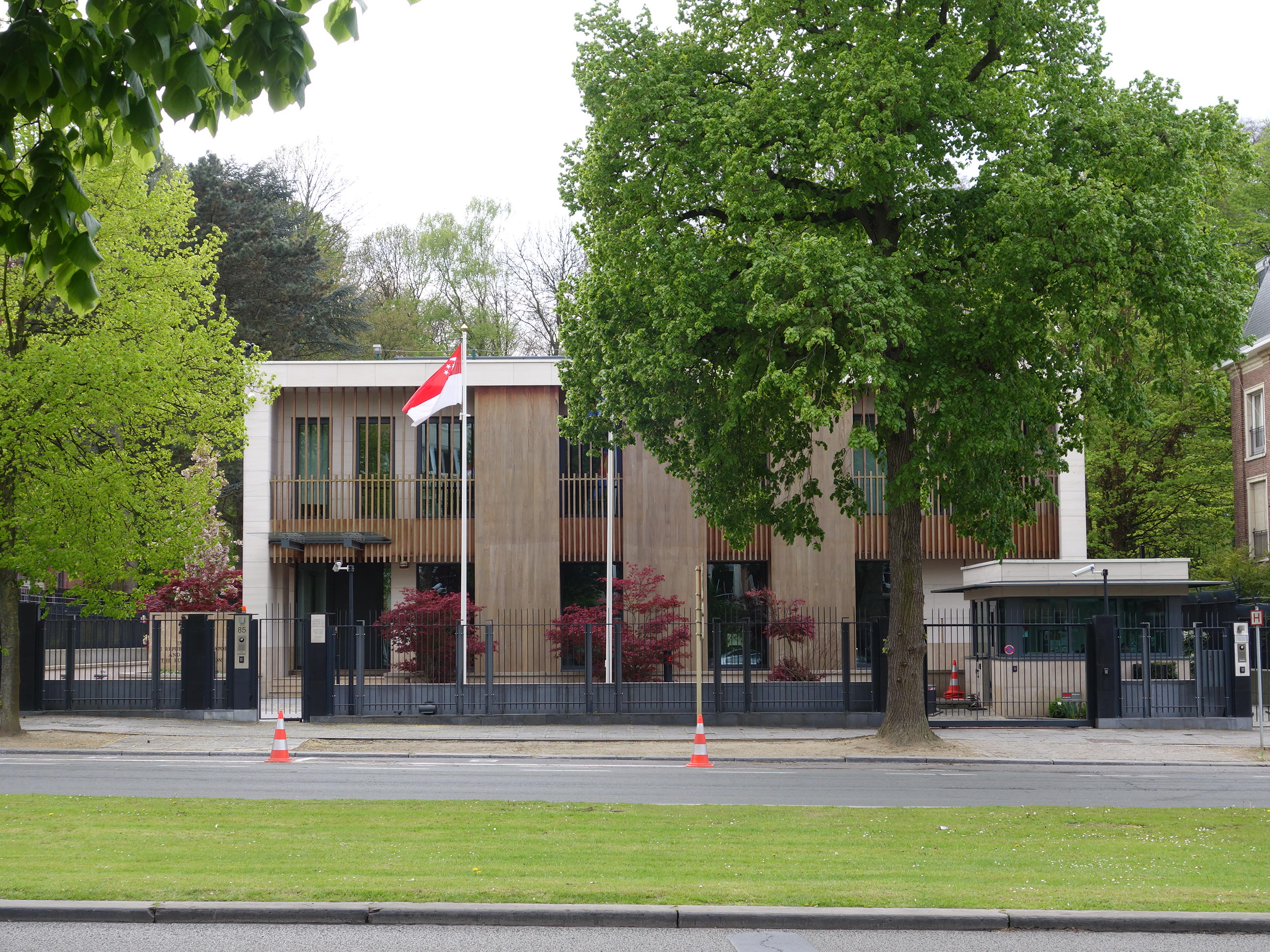
Embassy of Singapore

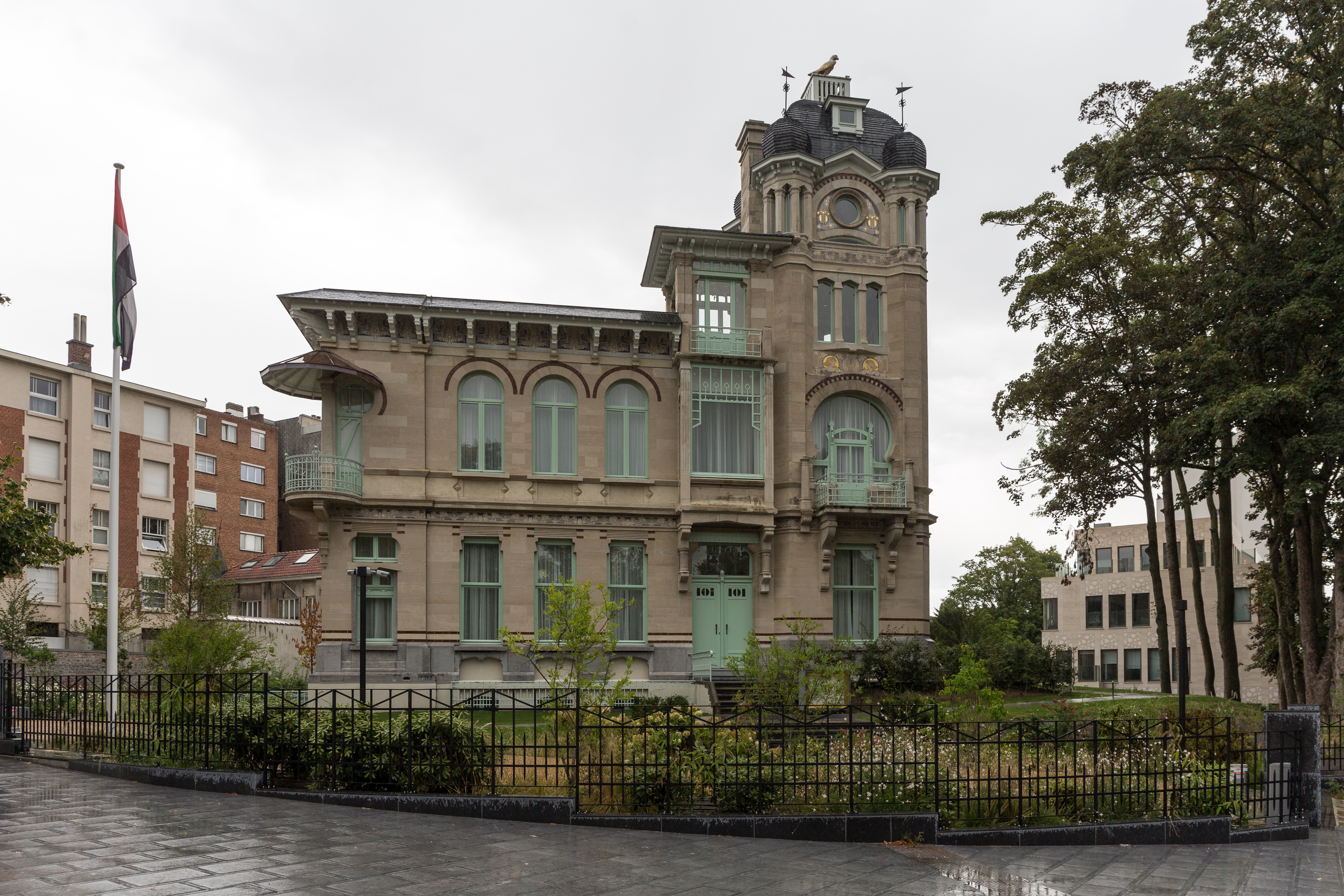
Embassy of the United Arab Emirates

== See also ==
- List of streets in Brussels
- Art Nouveau in Brussels
- Art Deco in Brussels
- History of Brussels
- Belgium in the long nineteenth century
