= Michel Polak =

Belgian architect

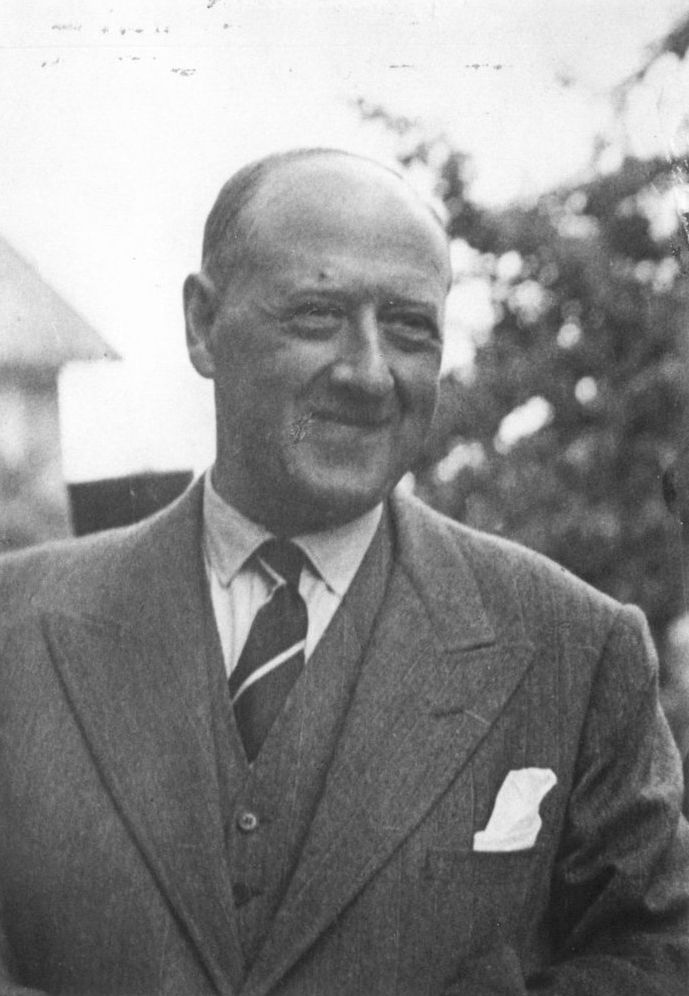
- Born: 27 January 1885; Mexico City
- Died: 4 October 1948; Brussels
- Occupation: Architect
- Buildings: Villa Empain, Europa building

Michel Polak (27 January 1885 – 4 October 1948) was a Belgian-Swiss architect.

== Career ==
Polak used various styles according to the tastes of his clientele: Beaux-Arts, Art Deco, refined modern classicism. In Brussels, he notably designed the Residence Palace, the Hôtel Le Plaza, and the Villa Empain, during the first half of the 20th century.

== List of works ==
- Villa of Henri Nestlé, in Montreux (Transformation, 1910)
- Riant-Château luxury apartment complex, in Montreux (1911–1913)
- Résidence Palace, Rue de la Loi/Wetstraat, in Brussels (1923–1926)
- Municipal Theatre, in Huy (1927)
- Hôtel Atlanta, Boulevard Adolphe Max/Adolphe Maxlaan 3, in Brussels (1924–1929)
- Development of the Grand Bazar, Boulevard Anspach/Anspachlaan, in Brussels (1926)
- Hôtel Albert I, Place Charles Rogier/Karel Rogierplein, in Saint-Josse-ten-Noode (1927–1928)
- Hôtel Le Plaza, Boulevard Adolphe Max, in Brussels (1928–1932)
- Headquarters of the Electric Company Electrobel, Place du Trône/Troonplein, in Brussels (1928–29)
- Villa Empain, Avenue Franklin Roosevelt/Franklin Rooseveltlaan 67, in Brussels (1931)
- Dispensary of the Red Cross, Rue du Rempart des Moines/Papenvest, in Brussels (1933)
- Eastman Dental Hospital, Leopold Park, in Brussels (1934–35)
- Building of the Régie des Téléphones et Télégraphes, Rue des Palais/Paleizenstraat, in Schaerbeek (1935)
- Théo Fleischman, Avenue Hamoir/Hamoirlaan, in Uccle (1935)
- Buildings, Boulevard Saint-Michel/Sint-Michielslaan, in Etterbeek (1936)
- Concourse of the Mont des Arts/Kunstberg, in Brussels (1937)
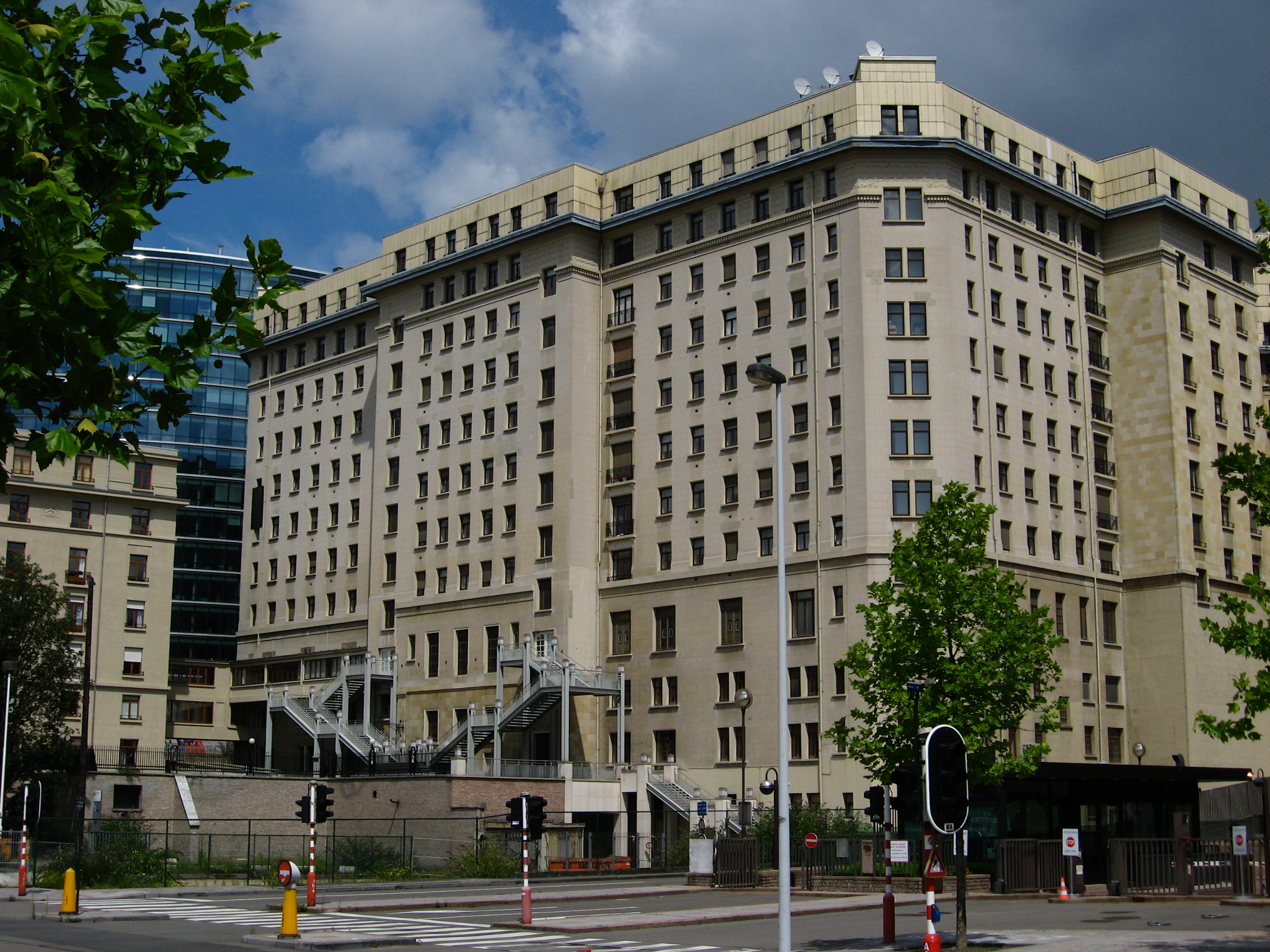
Résidence Palace, Brussels (1923–1926)

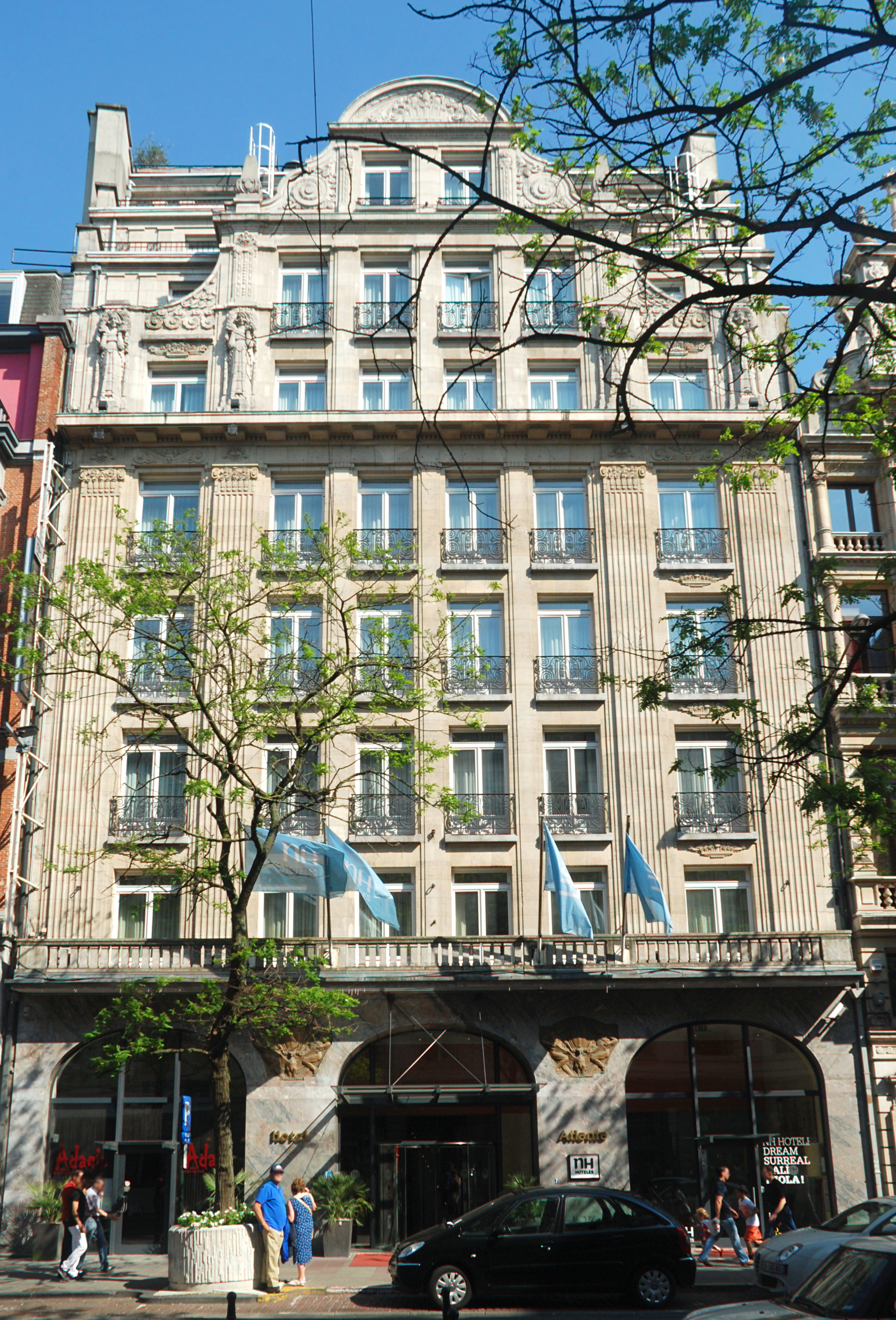
Hôtel Atlanta, Brussels (1924–1929)

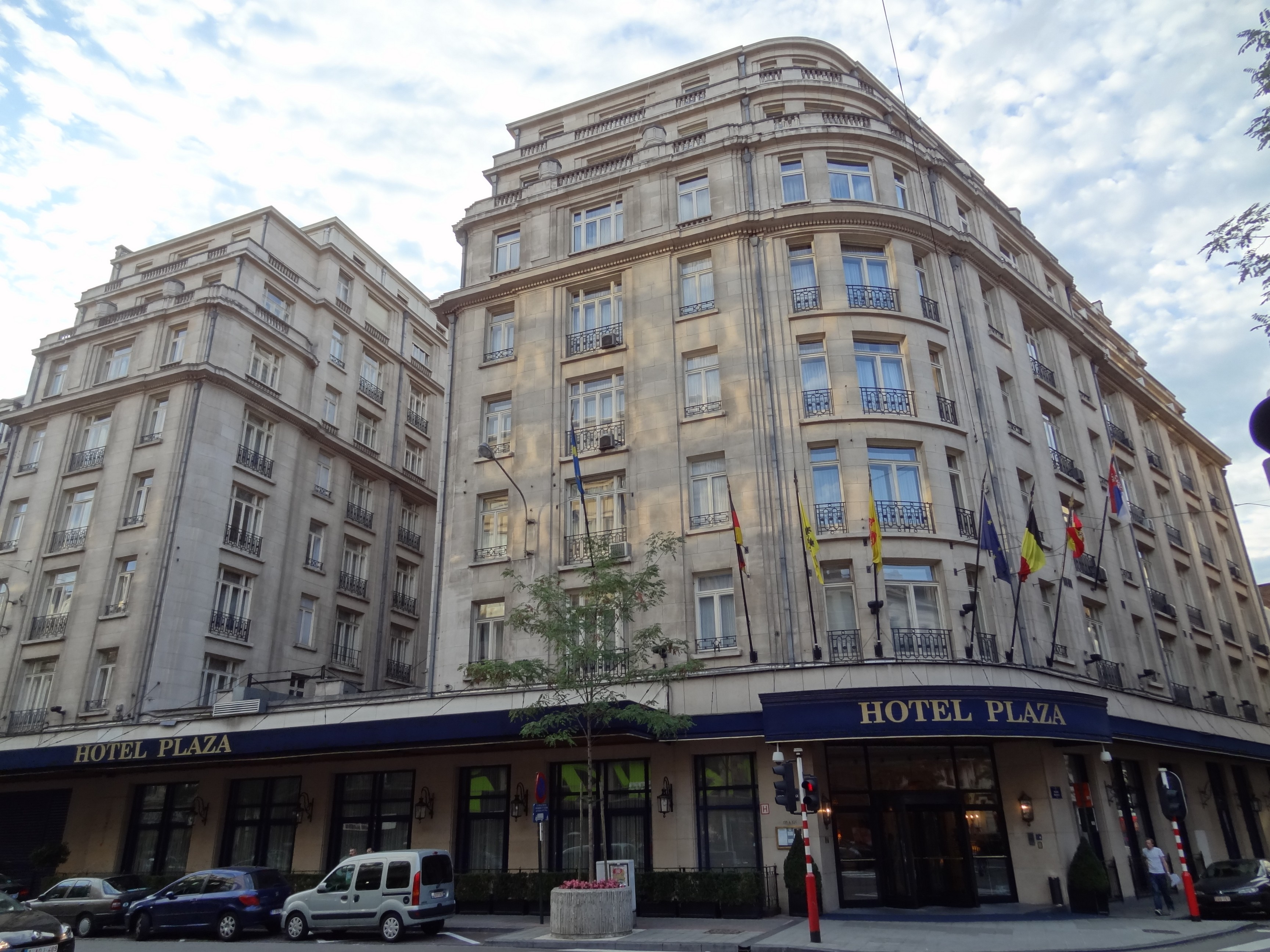
Hôtel Le Plaza, Brussels (1928–1932)

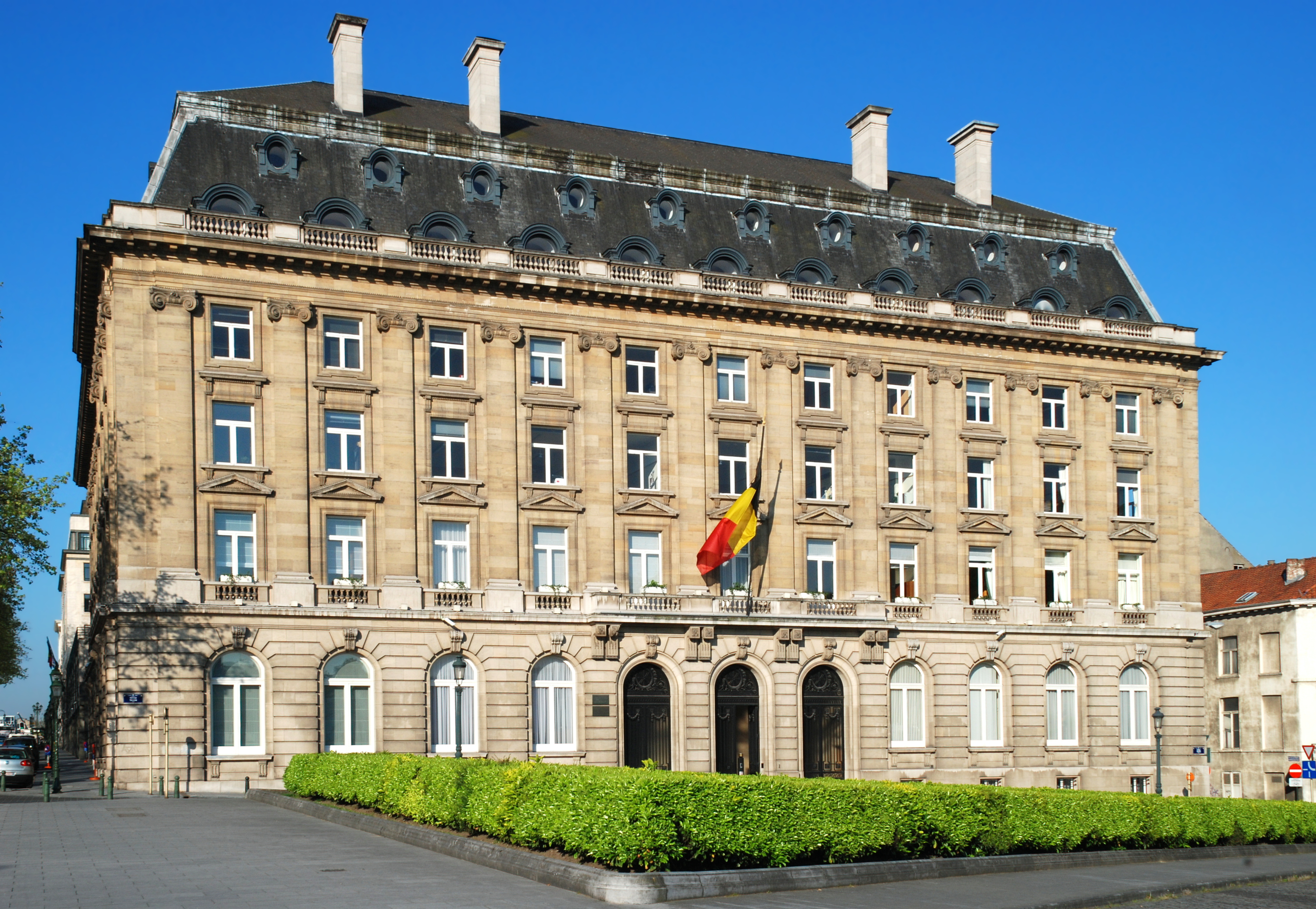
Headquarters of Electrobel, Brussels (1928–29)

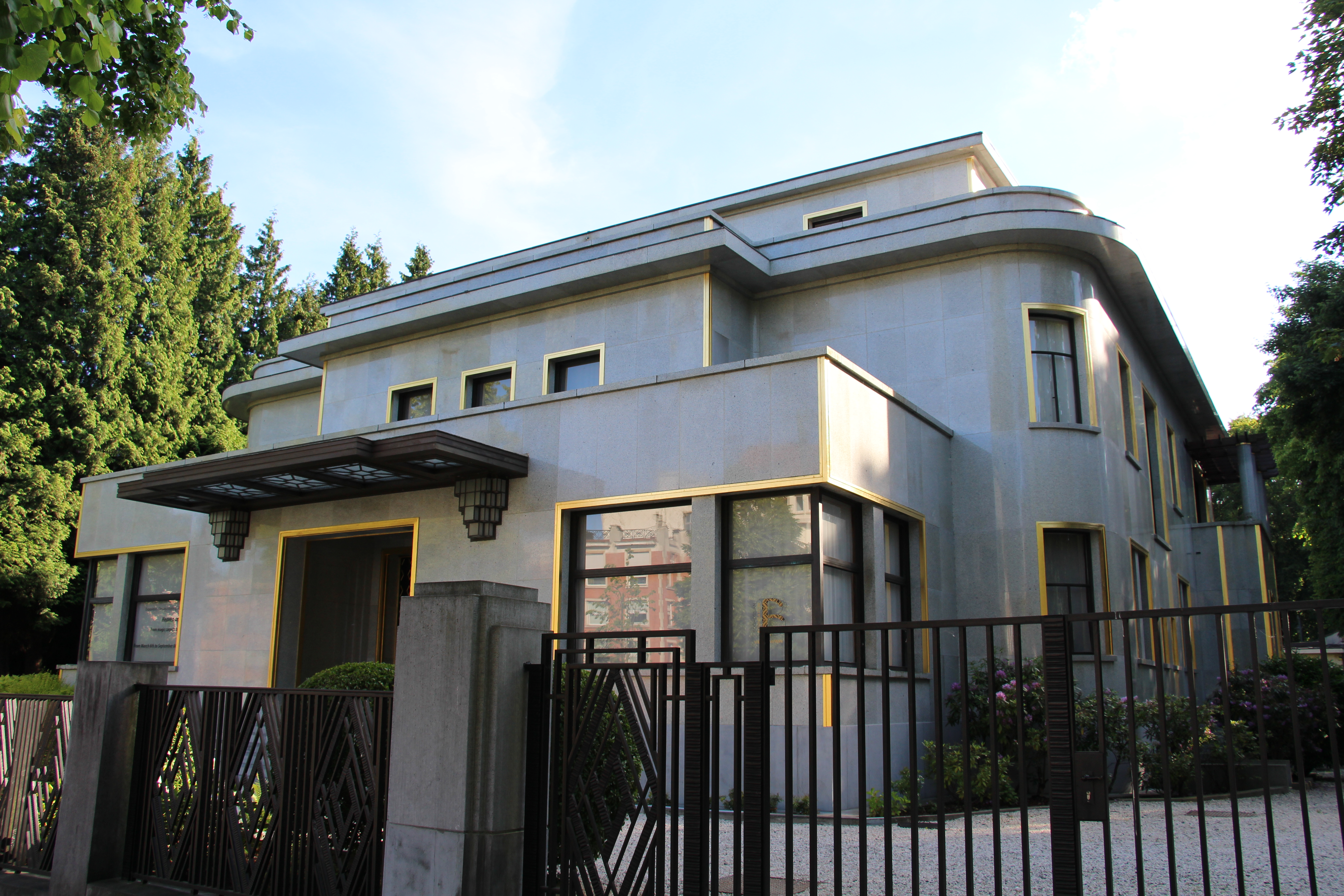
Villa Empain, Brussels (1931)

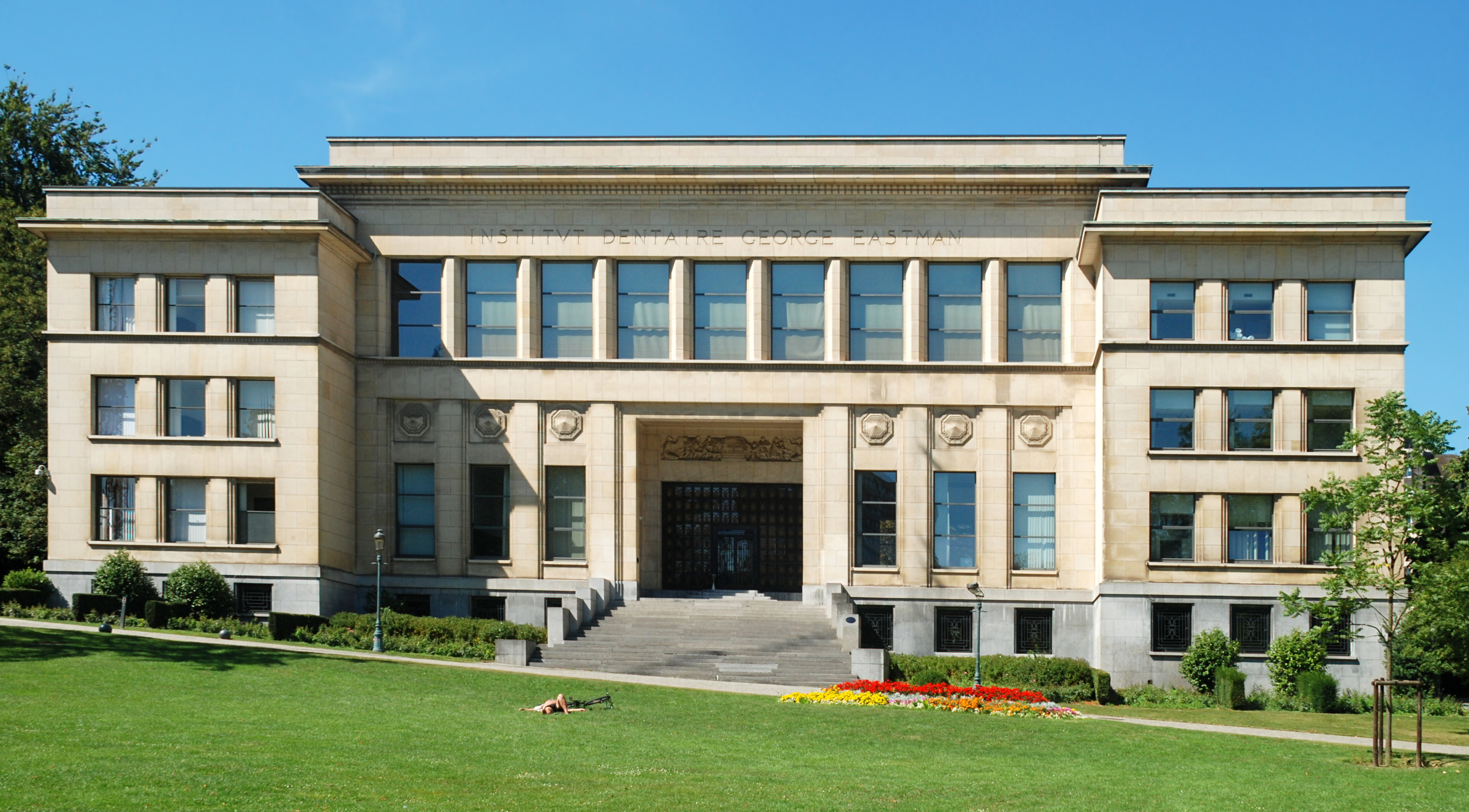
Eastman Dental Hospital, Brussels (1934–35)

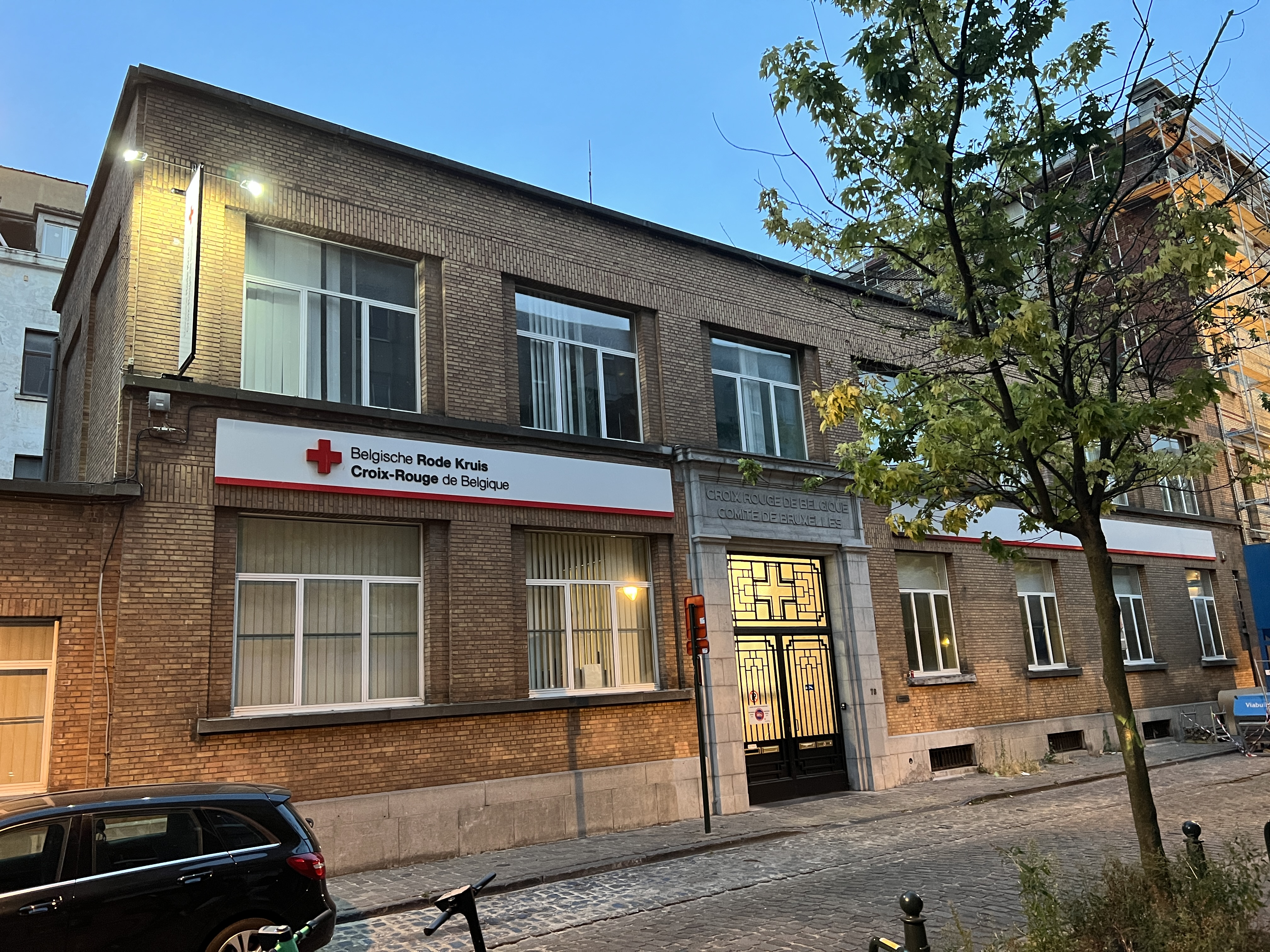
Dispensary of the Belgian Red Cross, designed with Alfred Hoch, Brussels (1933)
