= Grivegnée =

Sub-municipality of Liège, Belgium

Grivegnée Grimgnêye (Walloon)
- Sub-municipality of Liège
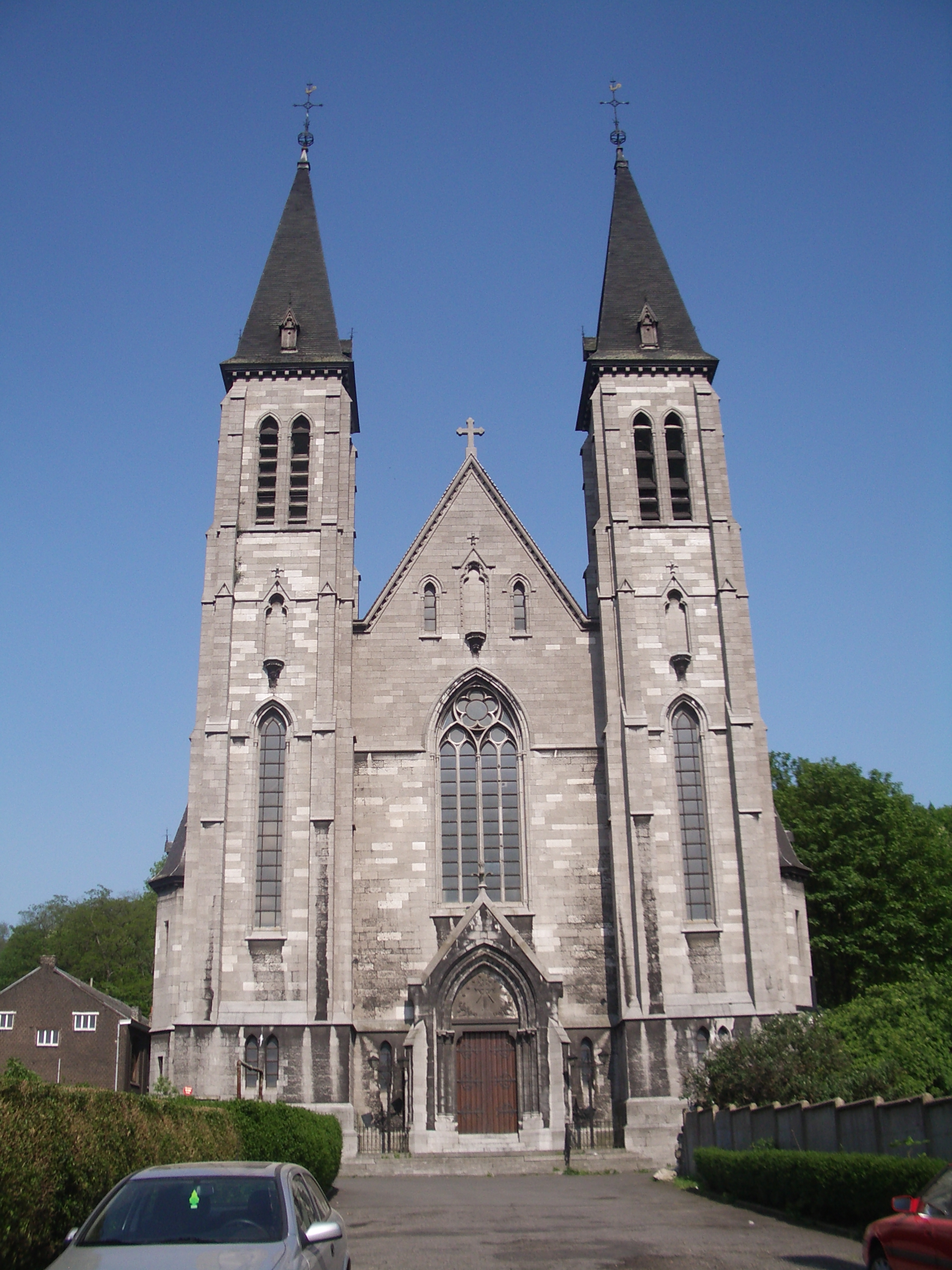
- Saint-Lambert Church

- Location in Liège
- Interactive map of Grivegnée
- Location within Belgium Location within Liège Province
- Coordinates: 50°37′18″N 5°36′38″E
- Country: Belgium
- Community: French Community
- Region: Wallonia
- Province: Liège
- Arrondissement: Liège
- Municipality: Liège

Area
  - Total: 4.75 km^{2} (1.83 sq mi)

Population (2020-01-01)
  - Total: 19,791
  - Density: 4,170/km^{2} (10,800/sq mi)
- Postal codes: 4030
- Area codes: 04

Grivegnée (French pronunciation: [ɡʁivɲe]; Walloon: Grimgnêye) is a sub-municipality of the city of Liège located in the province of Liège, Wallonia, Belgium. It was a separate municipality until 1977. On 1 July 1871, Bressoux was detached from Grivegnée. On 1 January 1977, Grivegnée was merged into Liège.

== Geography ==
Grivegnée occupies the largest part of the urban centre on the right bank of the Maas, north of the Ourthe. Grivegnée has a population of around 20,000 people, which makes it the largest in population behind the main city of Liège itself.

One of the main sights in Grivegnée is the Fort de la Chartreuse.

The core of Grivegnée is located near the Ourthe. In the north-eastern direction there are several other residential areas.

== Born in Grivegnée ==
Antoine Varlet (1893-1940), architect

Jacques Grippa (1913-1990), politician

Edouard "Eddy" Paape (1920-2012), cartoonist
