= Marie Lesueur =

French ballet dancer

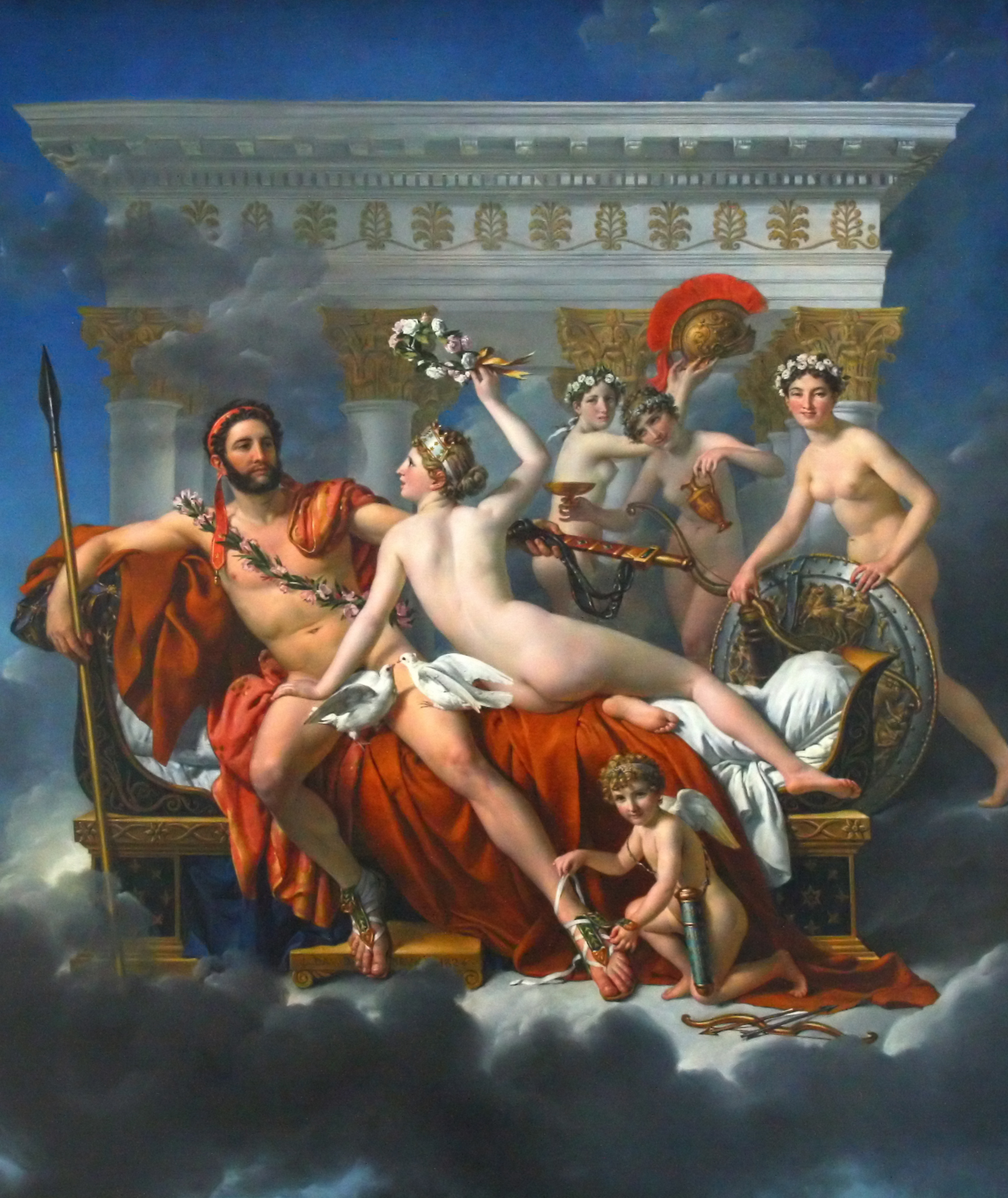
Jacques-Louis David, Mars Being Disarmed by Venus (Brussels) - Venus was modeled by Lesueur.

Marie Lesieur (French pronunciation: [maʁi ləsɥœʁ]; 8 October 1799, Paris – 6 April 1890, Ixelles, Brussels), known as Lesueur, was a French ballet dancer.

== Life ==
The daughter of Hébert Lesieur and Marie Calliaud, Lesieur made her debut at the Théâtre de Marseille in 1816, as a 'sujet de la danse'. In the course of a production of the ballet La Naissance de Vénus (The Birth of Venus) in July 1817 she was noted for turning her back on the public, in an inconvenient attitude, but she was pardoned for this and quickly became Marseilles's favourite dancer. Two years later she moved to Brussels to join the ballet troupe formed there by Jean-Antoine Petipa with some of the dancers from Marseille. The Almanach des spectacles for 1820 stated:

The inhabitants of Brussels eagerly await, it is said, a new goddess, once crowned in Marseille – this is Mlle Lesueur.

She made her Brussels debut at the Théâtre de la Monnaie on 20 May 1819 in the ballet Almaviva et Rosine and was an immediate and massive success with the public. The 1822 Revue des spectacles described her as a dancer

generally good in pantomime; but she gives to her playing expressions that are too 'outrée' which must soon tire her. qui doivent la fatiguer beaucoup. Gifted, in her knees and feet, with extraordinary vigour for her gender, and sometimes in her dancing she is noted more for force than for grace. At rest, she has a unique aplomb and executes pirouettes very well; she has beautiful make-up and pleases the public.

In a production of the ballet Psyché in April 1823, Mlle Lesueur was the victim of a set-operator's negligence:

A flaming torch, touching her robe, left some sparks on it which began to burn more fiercely, until it was noticed. Psyché was screaming, people behind the scenes and in the audience thought it was already too late to save her; but luckily a devil more human than his fellows came to her aid and she was left for ... her robe.

Very quickly she won a reputation as a major dancer, but also as a woman of character, who was in the ballet come rain or shine. The famous painter Jacques-Louis David made her the model for Venus in his 1824 Mars Being Disarmed by Venus (in which Lucien Petipa also appeared as Cupid). In January 1826 Mlle Lesueur fell seriously ill and, after a few brief returns to the stage, she announced that her health would not allow her to continue her career. With her protector, the comte van Gobbelschroy, interior minister to William I, she set up home in the rural property (later known as the château Malou) he had acquired at Woluwe-Saint-Lambert near Brussels. Van Gobbelschroy committed suicide in 1850, having used up his fortune setting up the first candle factories in France and Belgium. Some sources state that he and Lesueur married, though the comte's death certificate states he was unmarried. After the comte's death, Mlle Lesueur devoted herself to acts of charity, taking a small apartment in rue de la Grosse Tour, before moving to Ixelles. She died in complete poverty aged 90 in a small house on rue Keyenveld. In 1824 a lithograph by Eeckhout portrayed her as Venus.
