= Malou Park =

Park in Woluwe-Saint-Lambert, Belgium

- Parc Malou (French); Maloupark (Dutch)
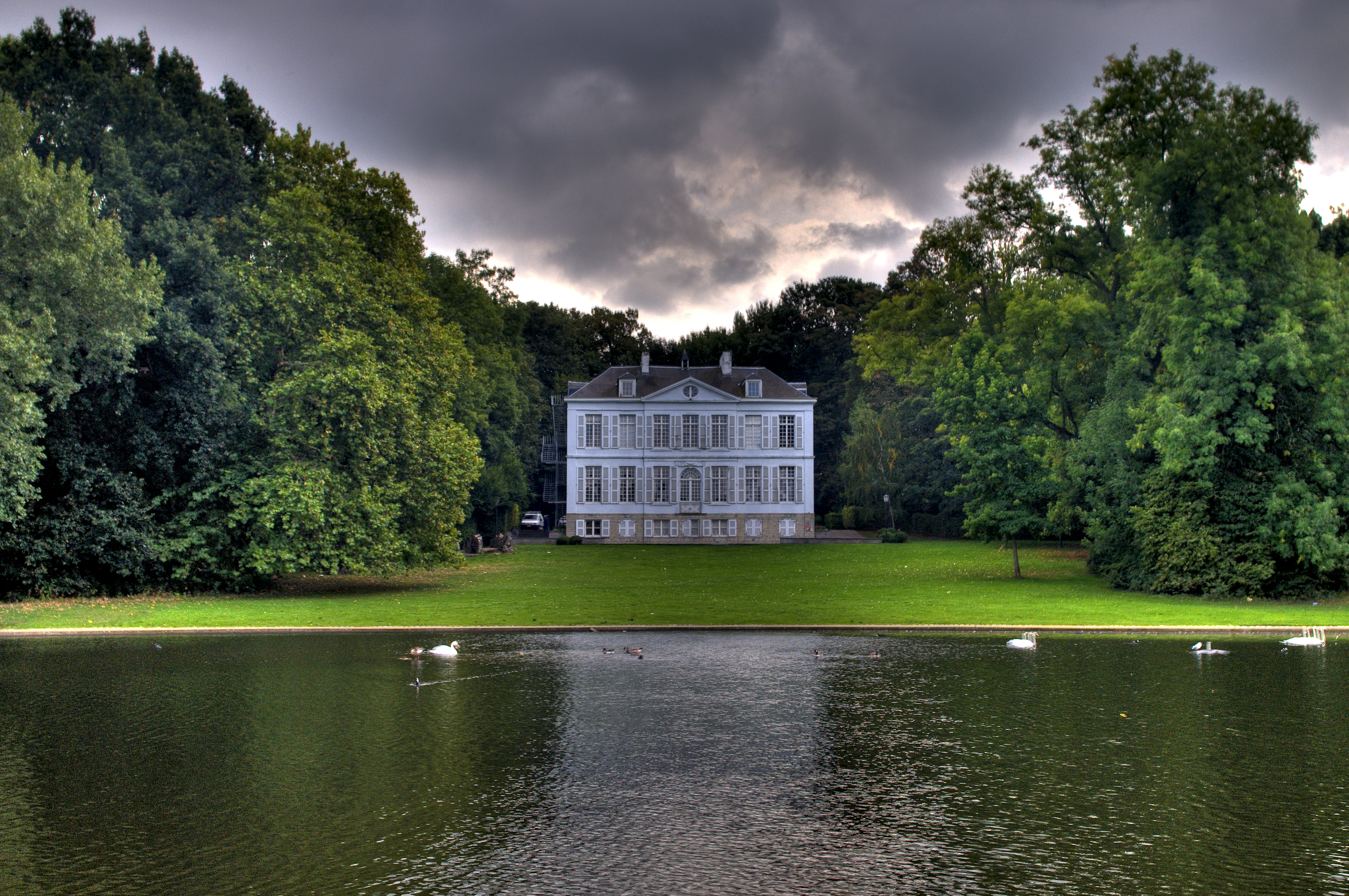
- Malou Park and the Château Malou
- Interactive map of Malou Park
- Type: Public park
- Location: Woluwe-Saint-Lambert, Brussels-Capital Region, Belgium
- Coordinates: 50°50′31″N 4°26′20″E
- Area: 8 ha (20 acres)
- Status: Open year-round

Malou Park (French: Parc Malou, pronounced [paʁk malu]; Dutch: Maloupark, pronounced [maˈluːˌpɑr(ə)k]) is an urban park in the Woluwe-Saint-Lambert municipality of Brussels, Belgium. It is in the valley of the Woluwe stream, to the south-east of the Woluwe Shopping Center. It is the municipality's oldest and biggest park.

== History ==
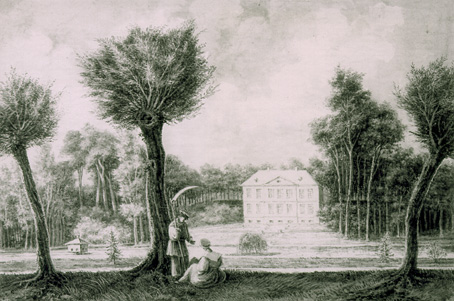
A historic view of the park and the Château Malou from 1831

The park was established on the marshy, boggy field surrounding the banks of the Struybeek stream, a tributary of the Woluwe. In 1774 the park featured seven fish ponds, a small hunting lodge called t'Speelgoet and a small reservoir. The gardens of Speelgoet Castle were laid out in the early 17th century by the hunting lodge's first known owners, a local family called Preud'homme.

In 1776, the local merchant and banker Lambert de Lamberts built his château residence in the park, which was to be later renamed after Jules Malou, the most famous of its residents. The château's successive owners transformed the formal gardens to the park's present form, a landscape largely covered by trees.

The municipality of Woluwe-Saint-Lambert acquired the park in 1951. The remains of the previously large bogs or marshy areas can still be seen behind the Lindekemale watermill.

== Situation ==
Malou Park lies to the east of the major thoroughfare Boulevard de la Woluwe/Woluwelaan, bordered from the north by the Avenue Debecker/Debeckerlaan, from the south by the Chaussée Stockel/Stokkelsesteenweg and from the east by the Chemin du Struybeken/Struybekenweg.

The park overlooks the valley of the Woluwe, which is a tributary of the large lake on the park's western side. It covers some 8 hectares (20 acres) in total, including the last remaining pond, home to several ducks and swans.

There are four principal recreation areas within the park: the walk along the banks of the brook and pond, renovated in 2001; the area of relaxation and culture in and around the Château Malou, with its contemporary art exhibitions; the botanical area with vegetable groupings such as alder trees, with ivy and lesser celandine, and a marshy alder plantation with nettles and meadowsweet; and a playground to the east of the château featuring a pirate boat.

== Buildings and monuments ==
One of the park's most prominent features is the Château Malou, a neoclassical castle built in 1776. From 1853 to 1886, the building was occupied by the politician and statesman Jules Malou, and both the château and the surrounding parkland bear his name.

The Lindekemale watermill is a 12th-century structure on the park's northern side, currently operating as a restaurant. On the same side, there is also an enormous statue of a lion.

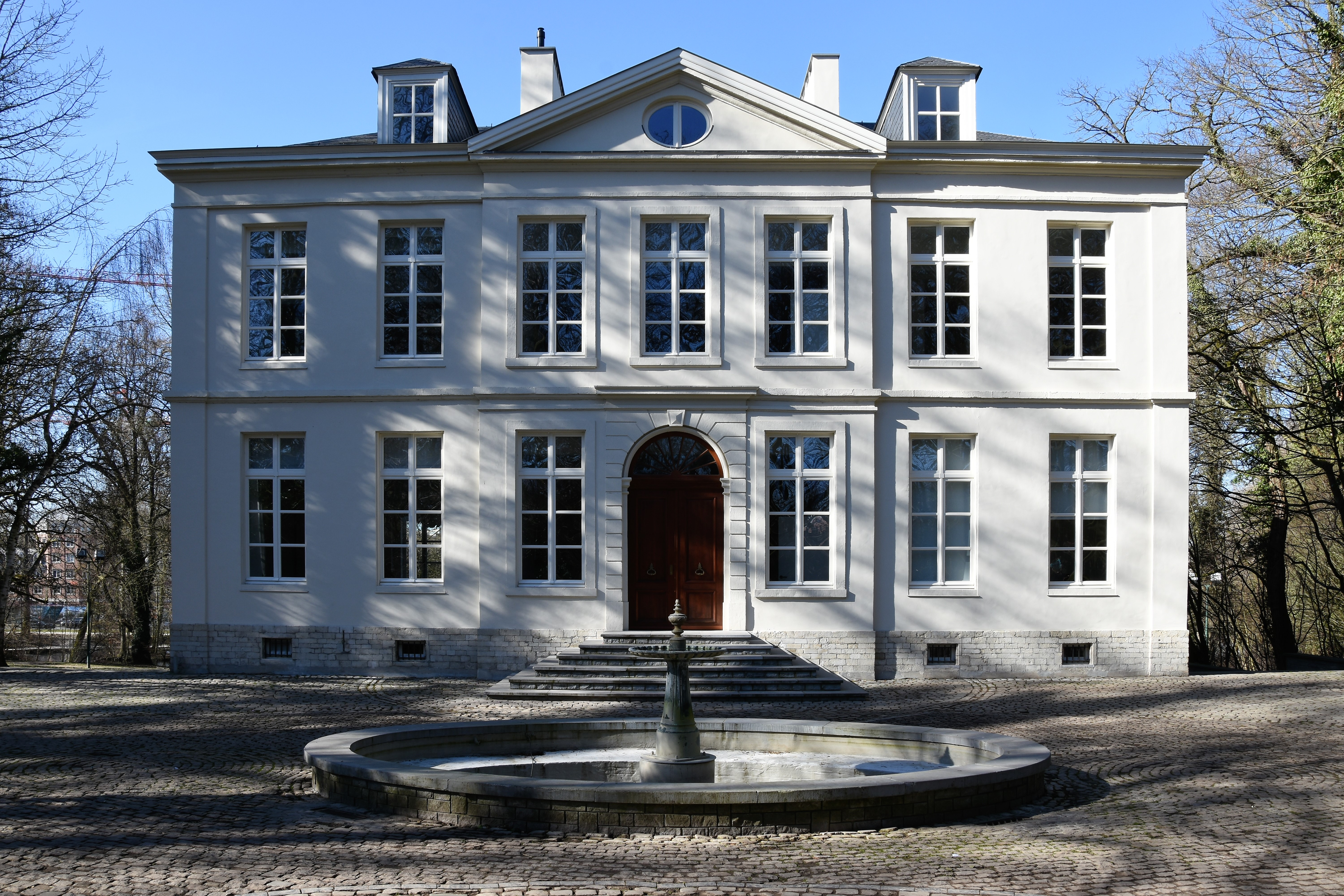
The Château Malou today

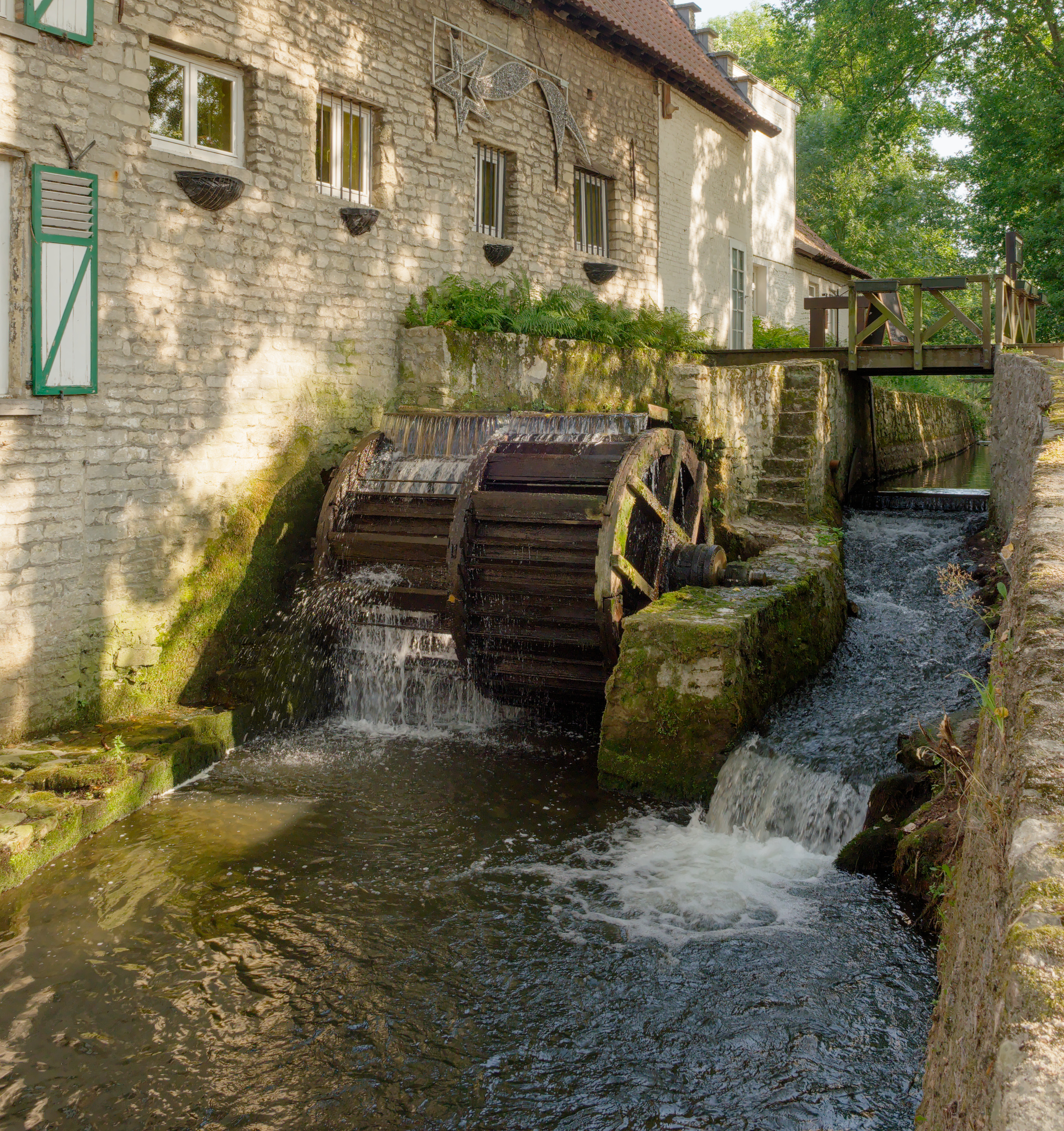
Lindekemale watermill

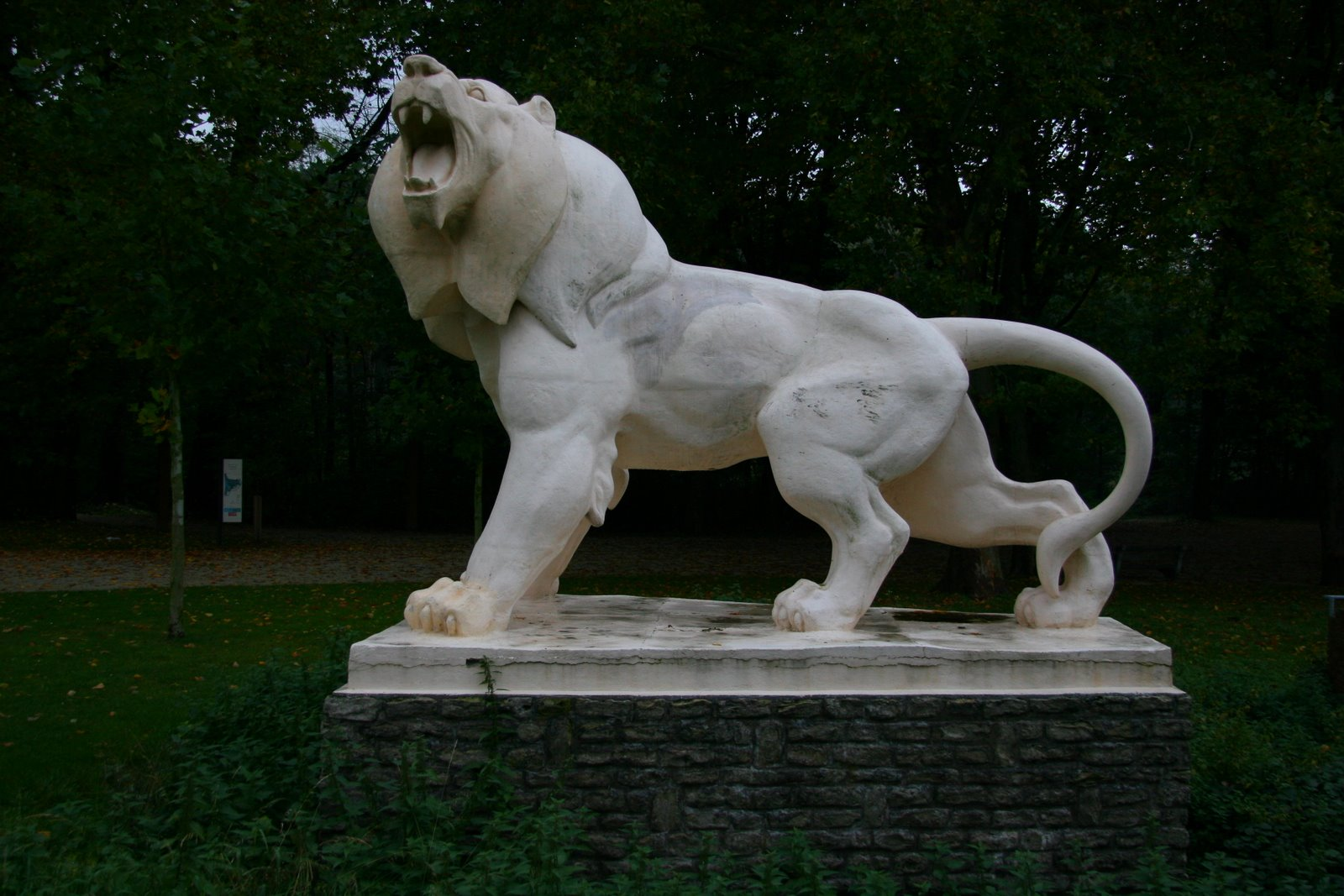
Lion statue

== See also ==
- List of parks and gardens in Brussels
- History of Brussels
- Belgium in the long nineteenth century
