= Lindekemale Mill =

Watermill in Brussels, Belgium

Coordinates: 50°50′40″N 4°26′20″E

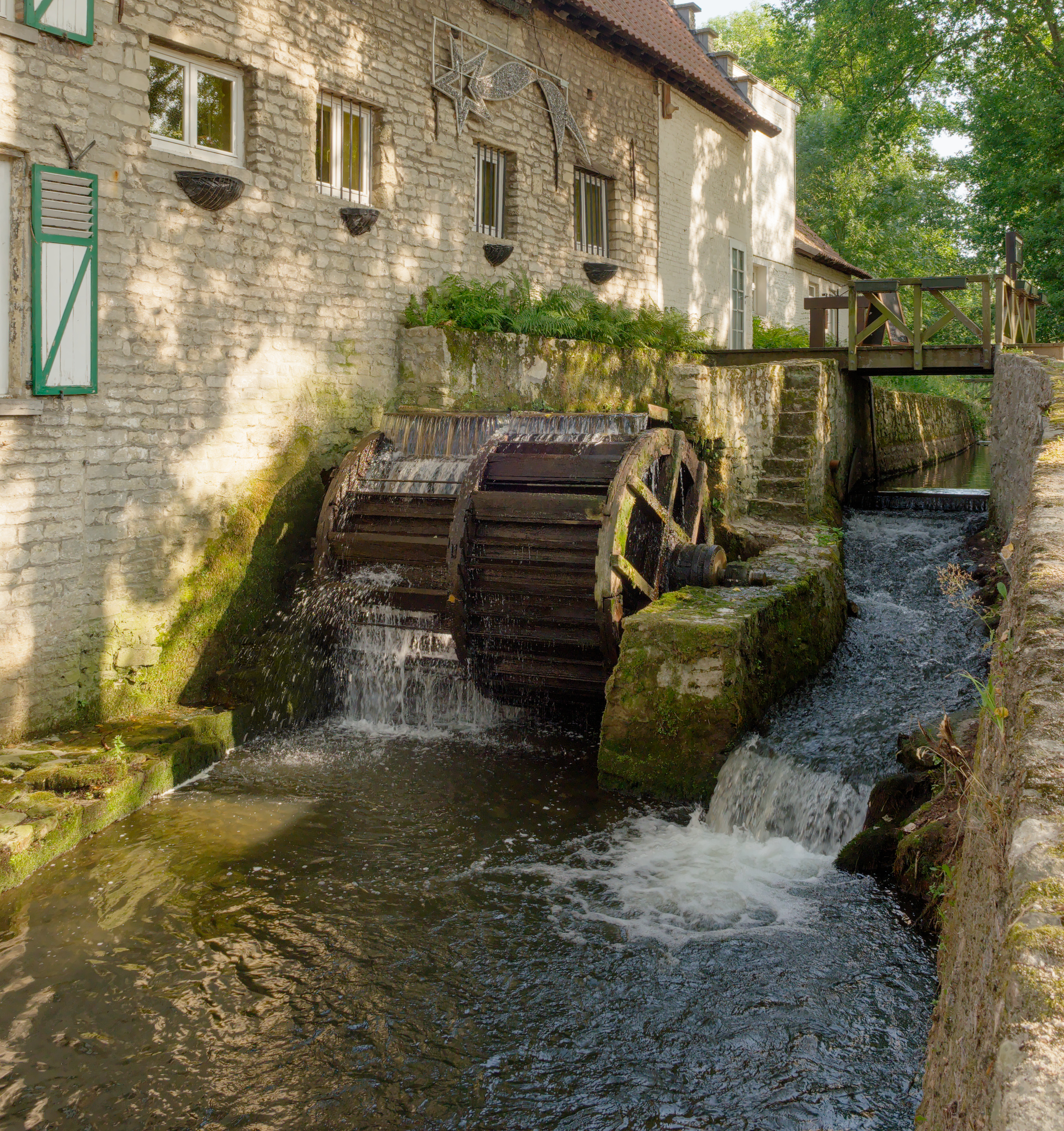
Lindekemale Mill

The Lindekemale Mill (French: Moulin de Lindekemale; Dutch: Lindekemalemolen) is a 12th-century watermill located on the northern fringes of Malou Park in the Woluwe-Saint-Lambert municipality of Brussels, Belgium. It was operated by the nearby Woluwe river. The building is currently operating as a restaurant.

== History ==
According to Woluwe-Saint-Lambert's official website, the Lindekemale Mill was first mentioned in 1129, making it the oldest existing watermill in the Brussels-Capital Region. At that time, it was the property of the feudal lords of the Woluwe area, who ceded it to the Norbertine abbey of Parc-le-Duc, which is situated close to present-day Leuven, in Flemish Brabant.

The mill was initially used to grind grain such as wheat, but from the 19th century, it was also used to process paper. One of the mill's owners during that time was Jean Devis, the longest-serving mayor of Woluwe-Saint-Lambert (between 1819 and 1860). In the early 20th century, it was expanded once again to process chicory and snuff tobacco.

Since 1955, the mill has been owned by the municipality. It has been a protected heritage site since 1989.
