= Château Malou =

Neoclassical building in Brussels, Belgium

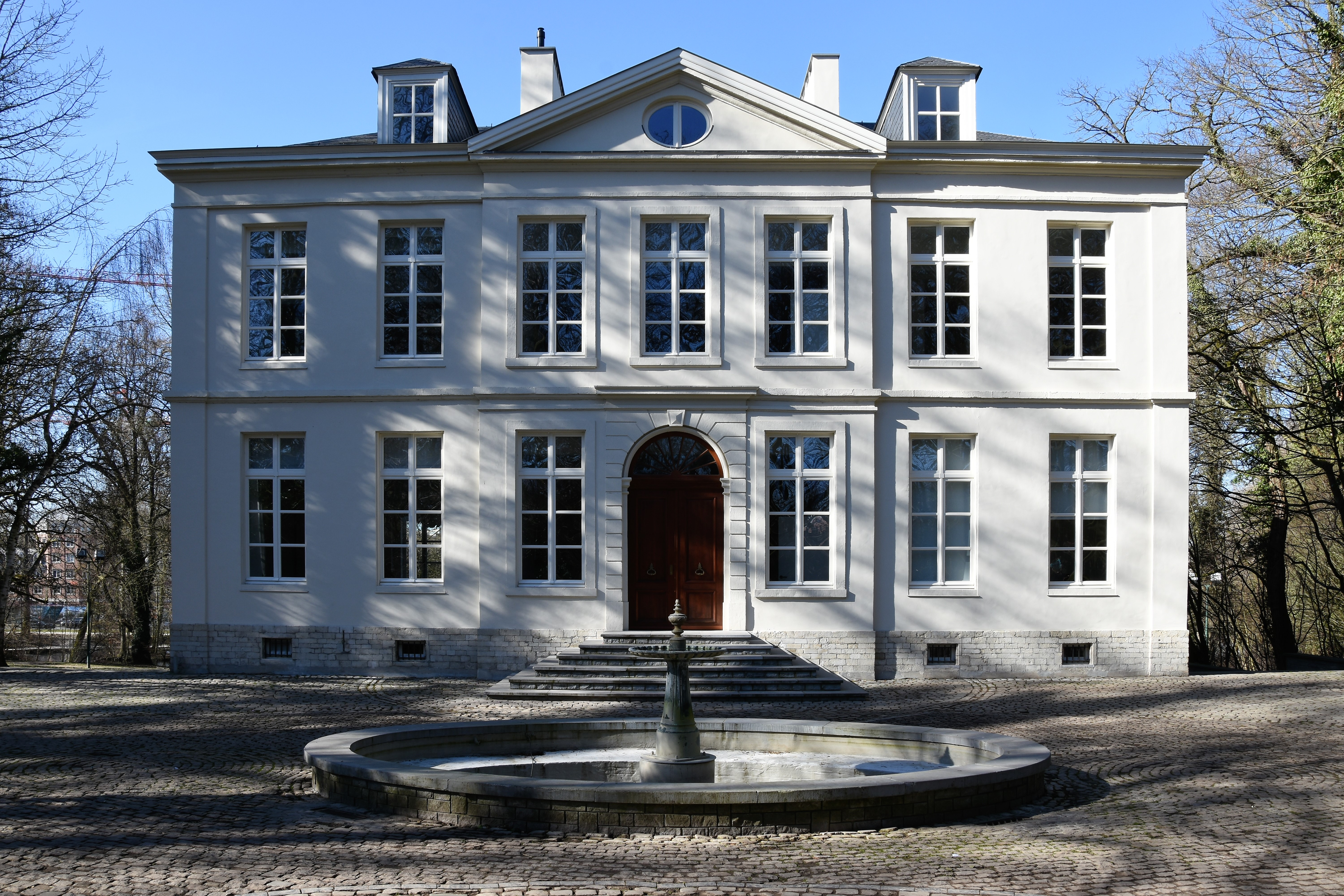
- A frontal view of the Château Malou
- Interactive map of the Château Malou area

General information
- Type: Château
- Architectural style: Neoclassical
- Location: Woluwe-Saint-Lambert, Brussels-Capital Region, Belgium
- Coordinates: 50°50′28.89″N 4°26′21.91″E
- Completed: 1776

The Château Malou (French) or Maloukasteel (Dutch) is a neoclassical building in the municipality of Woluwe-Saint-Lambert in Brussels, Belgium. The château is situated in the middle of Malou Park, overlooking the valley of the Woluwe stream. There is a formal lawn in front of the château, and beyond, there is a small lake with swans and ducks.

== History ==
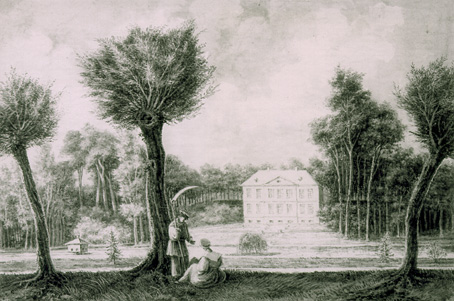
A historic view of the Château Malou and the park from 1831

The château was built in 1776 in the neoclassical style by a wealthy merchant called Lambert de Lamberts. The current building replaced a small 17th-century hunting lodge.

One of the château's owners was the orangist minister Pierre van Gobbelschroy, until the end of the Dutch period in 1829. After Belgium gained its independence, the château changed owners and eventually came into the possession of the Finance Minister of the new Belgian government, Jules Malou. Malou occupied the building from 1853 to 1886, and the château has retained his name ever since.

The château is now the property of the municipality of Woluwe-Saint-Lambert and is primarily used for cultural activities, exhibitions, etc.

== See also ==
- List of castles and châteaux in Belgium
- Neoclassical architecture in Belgium
- History of Brussels
- Culture of Belgium
- Belgium in the long nineteenth century
