= Joséphine-Charlotte =

Joséphine-Charlotte can refer to:

- Princess Joséphine-Charlotte of Belgium (1927-2005)
- Joséphine-Charlotte metro station, Brussels
- Grande-Duchesse Joséphine-Charlotte Concert Hall, Philharmonie Luxembourg
