= Sint-Stevens-Woluwe =

Coordinates: 50°52′N 4°27′E

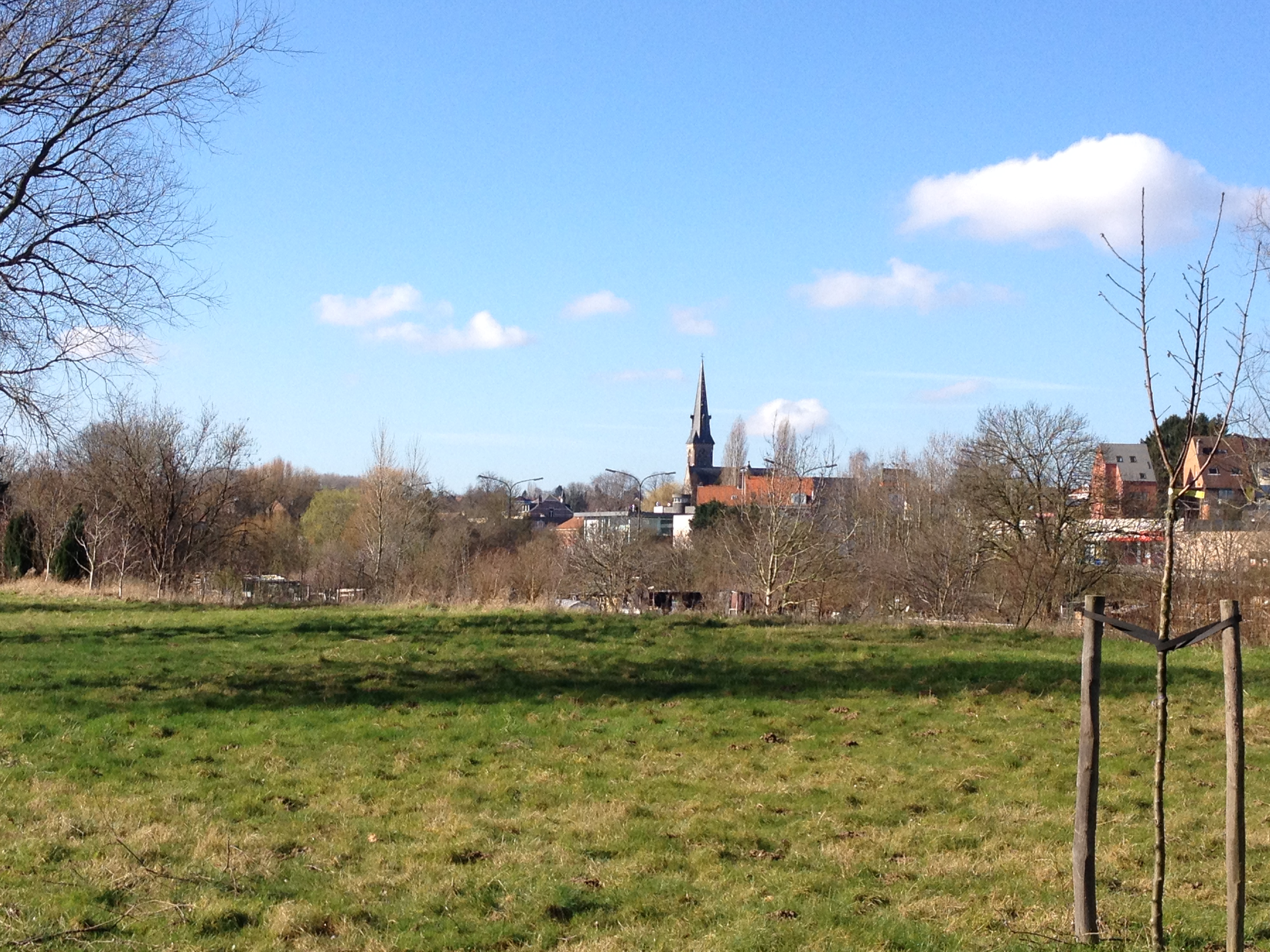

Sint-Stevens-Woluwe (Dutch pronunciation: [sɪnt ˈsteːvəns ˈʋoːlyu.ə]; French: Woluwe-Saint-Étienne, pronounced [wɔlywe sɛ̃t‿etjɛn]) is a town in the Belgian province of Flemish Brabant and is part of Zaventem municipality. The town is located near the Brussels-Capital Region.

== See also ==
- Woluwe River, the river flowing through the town.
- Woluwe-Saint-Pierre (Sint-Pieters-Woluwe), a nearby municipality.
- Woluwe-Saint-Lambert (Sint-Lambrechts-Woluwe), an adjacent municipality.
