= Mars Being Disarmed by Venus =

Painting by Jacques-Louis David

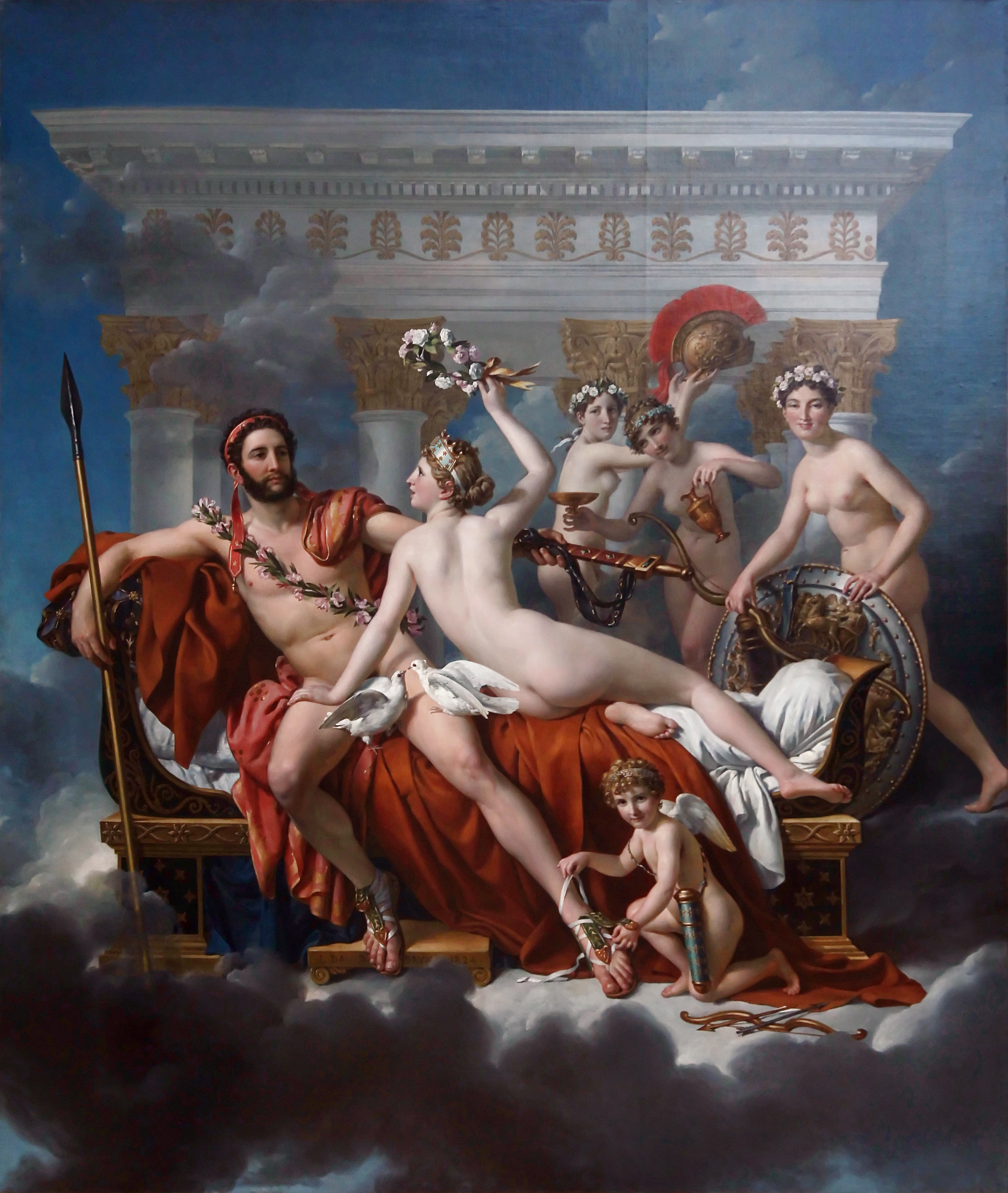
- Artist: Jacques-Louis David
- Year: 1824
- Medium: Oil on canvas
- Dimensions: 308 cm × 265 cm (121 in × 104 in)
- Location: Royal Museums of Fine Arts of Belgium, Brussels

Mars Being Disarmed by Venus is the last painting produced by the French artist Jacques-Louis David. He began it in 1822 (aged 73) during his exile in Brussels and completed it three years later, before dying in an accident in 1825. The work combines idealization with elements of realism. Specifically, David integrated the idealized forms of mythological painting with a realist attention to detail. This combination of two seemingly incompatible principles also plays an important role in the themes of the painting, most notably in its treatment of masculinity and femininity.

David sent the painting from Brussels for exhibition in Paris, where Romanticism was ascendant in the Salon of 1824. The painting initially received a muted response from critics, but over time its reputation has grown. It is now displayed in the Oldmasters Museum (part of the Royal Museums of Fine Arts of Belgium) in Brussels.

== Description ==
At over 3 m (10 ft) high, it is an imposing work. Set before a temple floating in the clouds, Venus, the goddess of love, and her followers, the three Graces and Cupid, are shown taking away the weapons, helmet, shield, and armor of Mars, the god of war. Mars allows himself to be disarmed and gives in to Venus's charms.

Most of David's models for the painting were figures involved in the Théâtre de la Monnaie: Venus was modeled by the actress Marie Lesueur, Cupid by Lucien Petipa, Mars by a subscriber or 'abonné', and one of the Graces by the Prince of Orange's mistress.

The painting is notable for not having a distinct artistic style, with David borrowing from divergent aesthetic traditions. David's themes go beyond the stylistic opposition of idealism versus realism, reflecting more broadly on the conflict between the Ancients and the Moderns. The art historian Philippe Bordes emphasizes this point, arguing that David was embracing "a past which was more than just the beau ideal" and "a present which was more than a stake in realism."

== Reception ==
The painting initially received little commentary from critics, perhaps owing to the artist's position in political exile. Critics who discussed the work focused on the technical aspects of the painting, saying less about its political significance. Critics were especially cautious about discussing the artist's exiled status, though their reticence around the subject may have called more attention to it.

== Analysis ==
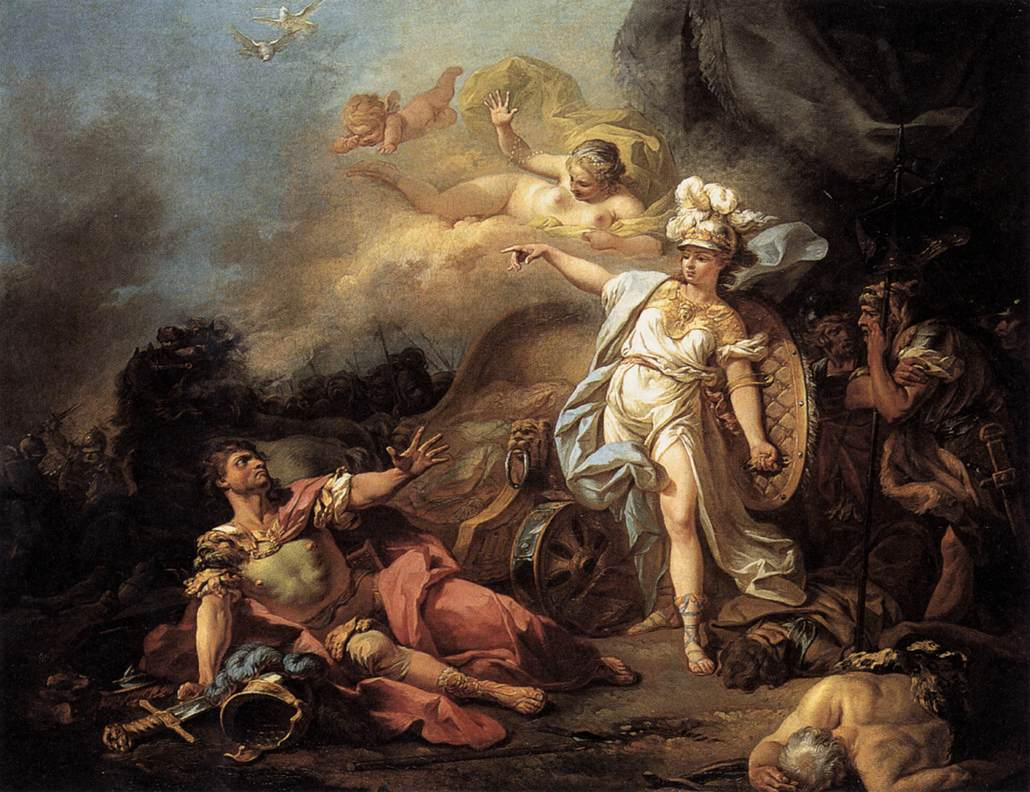
Jacques-Louis David, The Combat of Mars and Minerva. An example of the feminine triumphing over the masculine.

=== Power of the feminine ===
Art historians have sometimes seen the painting's treatment of Venus and Mars as a broader commentary on gender, showing femininity ultimately conquering masculinity. Venus, goddess of love, is here equated with femininity, emotionality, and pleasure. Mars, god of war, stands for the masculine ideals of strength and determination. The triumph of Venus, according to this interpretation, shows the capacity of emotions and pleasure to overcome strength and determination. David had previously explored related themes in early works such as Antiochus and Stratonica and Minerva Fighting Mars. In this respect, Mars Being Disarmed by Venus represents a return to form for David, departing from the emphasis on masculine heroism that had defined mid-career works such as the Oath of the Horatii.

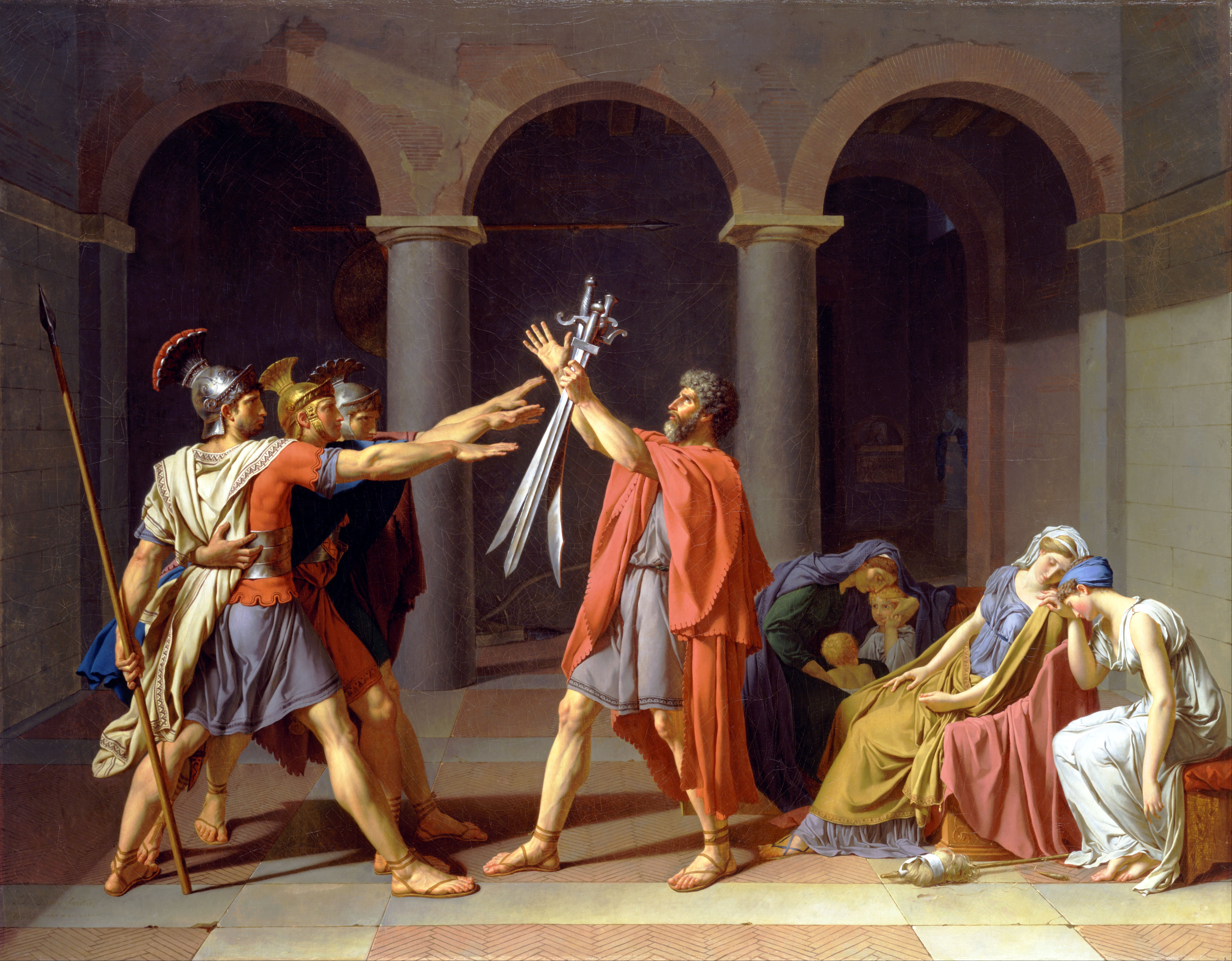
Jacques-Louis David, Oath of the Horatii. The three soldiers are meant to embody masculine virtues with their determination and willingness to fight for a greater cause.

=== Reinvention of mythology ===
The painting has sometimes been seen as a reinvention of the traditions that defined mythological painting. David departs from convention in depicting mythological figures with comparatively little idealization. David had pursued similar aims in Love and Psyche (David), which combines fantastical elements with the aesthetic of realism. Mars Being Disarmed by Venus nonetheless has idealized elements, including the exaggerated poses of the subjects, especially in the three Graces behind Venus and Mars.

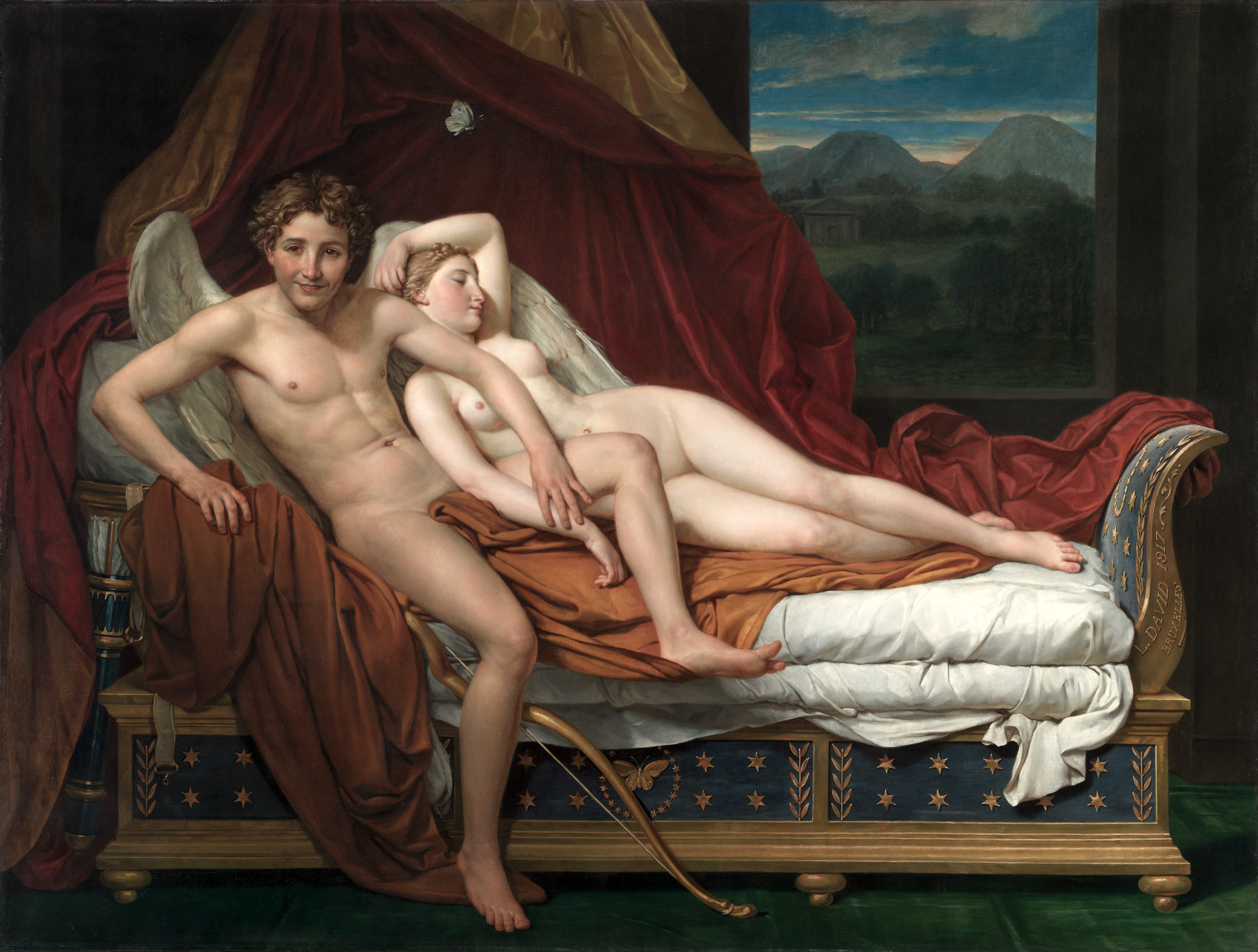
Jacques-Louis David, Cupid and Psyche. While mythological in subject, the painting incorporates realism in its representation of figures.

== Political message ==
In terms of technique, the painting can be described as combining idealism and realism, but art historians have sometimes seen this stylistic opposition as related to themes of gender and politics. David here departed from Neoclassicism, which typically glorified masculine virtue, often in service of the government. Venus subduing Mars takes on a political dimension insofar as it diverges from the aesthetic favored by the state, and which David had previously embraced. Art Historian Satish Padiyar argues that David, through the figures of Mars and Venus, "pulls his once authoritative language apart, shatters and disarms it."

== See also ==
- List of paintings by Jacques-Louis David
