= École pratique des hautes études commerciales =

University college in Belgium

EPHEC
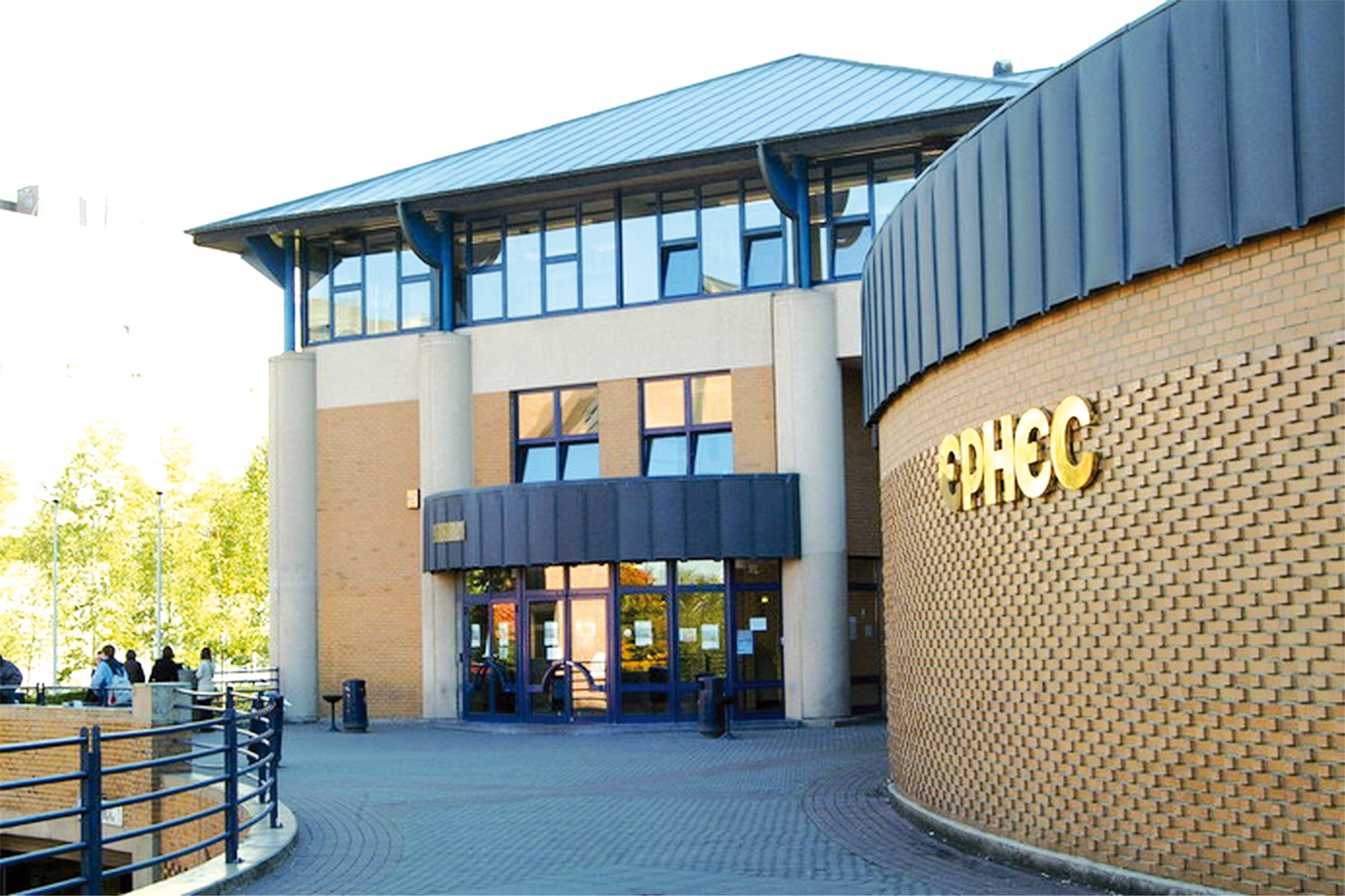
- Facade ephec
- Type: university college
- Undergraduates: Bachelor
- Location: Belgium
- Website: Site officiel de l'EPHEC

EPHEC is a university college in Belgium that brings together a college, a continuing education school, and a school of social promotion. EPHEC offers short-term training programs (bachelor's degrees), master's degrees, and specializations. It is subsidized by the French Community of Belgium. The school has six campuses, Woluwe-Saint-Lambert, Louvain-la-Neuve, Galileo and Lambermont in Schaerbeek, Schuman-Europe and Delta with the majority of courses taught in French and a few taught in English.

EPHEC is organized into four major training sectors: EPHEC Business, EPHEC Education, EPHEC Heath and EPHEC Tech.
