= Gribaumont metro station =

Metro station in Brussels, Belgium

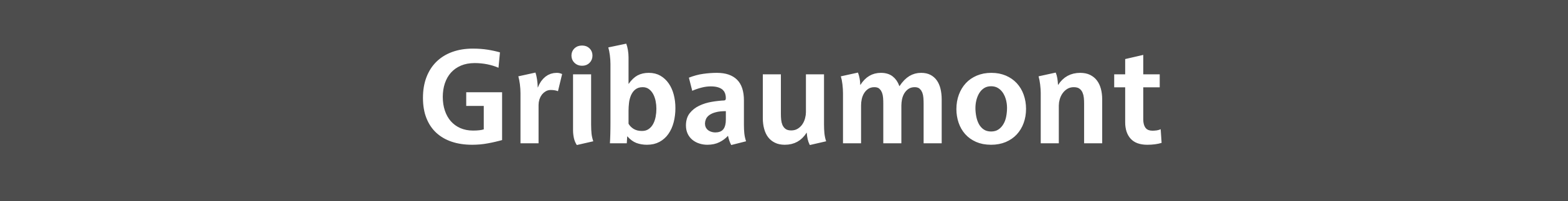

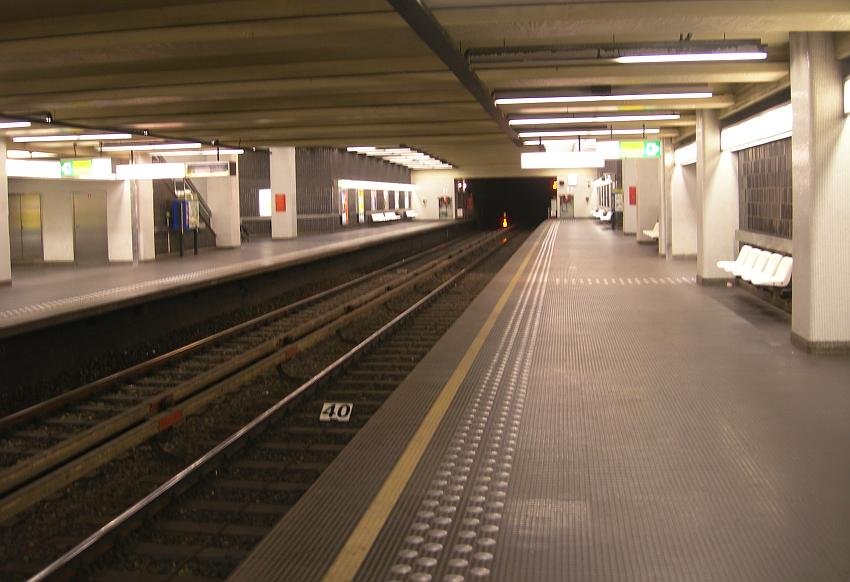
- Gribaumont metro station

General information
- Location: Avenue de Broqueville / De Broquevillelaan; 1200 Woluwe-Saint-Lambert, Brussels-Capital Region, Belgium
- Coordinates: 50°50′33″N 4°25′3″E
- Owner: STIB/MIVB
- Platforms: 2
- Tracks: 2

Construction
- Structure type: Underground

History
- Opened: 20 September 1976; 49 years ago

Services
Preceding station	Brussels Metro	Following station
Joséphine-Charlotte towards Gare de l'Ouest/Weststation	Line 1	Tomberg towards Stockel/Stokkel
Location

Gribaumont (French pronunciation: [ɡʁibomɔ̃]) is a Brussels Metro station on the eastern branch of line 1. It is located in the municipality of Woluwe-Saint-Lambert, in the eastern part of Brussels, Belgium. It is located under the Avenue de Broqueville/De Broquevillelaan and takes its name from the nearby Avenue Louis Gribaumont/Louis Gribaumontlaan, named after the landowner who helped develop the area in the 1900s.

The metro station opened on 20 January 1976. Since 4 April 2009, the station has been served by the eastern branch of line 1 (previously line 1B).

In 2008, the original Pavimento Pirelli black rubber floor tiles on the platforms were removed. They were replaced with new biscuit-coloured terrazzo tiles, with darker grey tiles nearest to the walls. The platform area overhead lighting was also replaced in late 2008.

== See also ==
- Transport in Brussels
- History of Brussels
