= Olivier Maingain =

Belgian politician (born 1958)

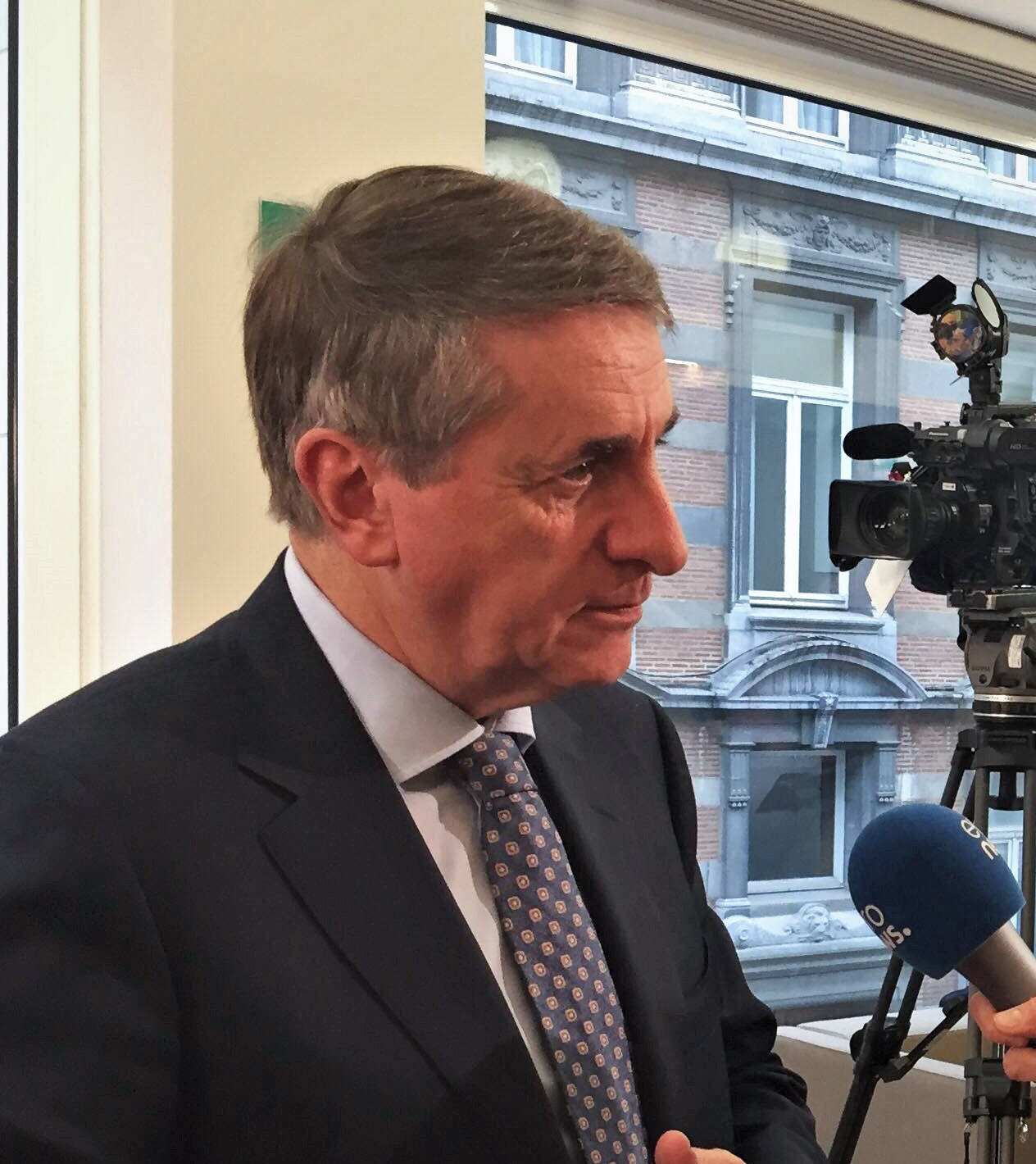
- Maingain in 2018
- Born: Olivier D. A. Gh. Maingain; 3 August 1958 (age 68); Woluwe-Saint-Lambert, Belgium
- Occupations: politician (DéFI, later LIB·RES), lawyer

Olivier D. A. Gh. Maingain (born 3 August 1958) is a Belgian francophone politician and former president of DéFI.

== Biography ==
Olivier Maingain was born in Woluwe-Saint-Lambert to a Flemish mother and a Walloon father, Roger Maingain (1923-2013) who was deputy secretary of the Association du personnel wallon et francophone des services publics (Association of Walloon and French-speaking civil servants), member of Wallonie Libre since the Liberation, president of the Ligue wallonne de l'agglomération de Bruxelles since 1960, member of the FDF from its foundation in 1964 and municipal councillor in Woluwe-Saint-Lambert from 1970.

After graduating as Master of Laws he qualified as a lawyer in 1982. In 1983 he became president of the FDF Youth. He was elected as a city councillor of Brussels in 1988. He entered the Parliament of the Brussels-Capital Region in 1989 and he was a Member of the Chamber of Representatives from 1991 to 2019. He became the president of the FDF (English: Democratic Front of the Francophones) in 1995. In 1995 too, he became an alderman of Brussels for DéFI, and was also elected party president. He was elected as a city councillor of the municipality of Woluwe-Saint-Lambert in 2006, where the city council voted him for mayor. In the 2007 elections Maingain received 45,439 votes in the electoral district Brussels-Halle-Vilvoorde.

Among the legal measures sponsored by him are a law protecting the confidentiality of journalists' sources and the inclusion in the Belgian Constitution of the principle of the abolition of the death penalty. His efforts also led to the main square of Brussels (the Grand-Place or Grote Markt) being placed on the UNESCO list of World Heritage Sites.

He is critical of the weakness of the Belgian central government and states that the Belgian state does not sufficiently protect the rights of French-speaking Belgian citizens. He feels that supporting a Belgian federated state is "honourable" and is against the "eagerness of certain Flemish political parties to destroy the reality of Brussels". In his view the main political leaders in Flanders show a cynical pragmatism in belittling the role of central government and building up the importance of the region of Flanders. His overly frank style of speaking and the often stigmatising tone of his arguments have caused him to be extremely unpopular in Flanders.

In 2010, the party's name was changed to Fédéralistes Démocrates Francophones (English: Francophone Democratic Federalists). In 2015, the FDF's name was changed to DéFI, a backronym of Démocrate fédéraliste indépendant (English: Independent Federalist Democrats). He retired as DéFI president in 2019 and was replaced by François de Smet.

In December 2024, following conflict with DéFI party president Sophie Rohonyi, Maingain departed the party he had led for 24 years. In April 2025, he formed a new political party, Free and Responsible, with his son Fabian and a number of other former DéFI members.

== Controversies ==
In the run-up to the federal elections of 10 June 2007, he printed and distributed unilingual French election pamphlets in the unilingual Dutch-speaking town of Merchtem.

In 2010 he compared the non-appointments of three French-speaking candidate-mayors by the Flemish government with practices similar to those during the "Nazi occupation" of Belgium.
