= Free and Responsible =

Free and Responsible Libres et responsables
- Abbreviation: LIB·RES
- Leader: Olivier Maingain
- Spokesmen: Olivier Maingain; Delphine De Valkeneer; Marc Cools; Brice Kotsifakos Vandenbroucke
- Founders: Olivier Maingain; Fabian Maingain
- Founded: 24 April 2025
- Split from: DéFI
- Ideology: Brussels regionalism Social liberalism Liberalism (Belgian); Secularism; Direct democracy Pro-Europeanism
- Political position: Centre-right
- Colours: Yellow; Blue
- Chamber of Representatives: 0 / 61 (French-speaking seats)
- Senate: 0 / 24 (French-speaking seats)
- Walloon Parliament: 0 / 75
- Parliament of the French Community: 1 / 94
- Brussels Parliament: 0 / 72 (French-speaking seats)
- European Parliament: 0 / 8 (French-speaking seats)

Website
- www.libres.be

Free and Responsible (French: Libres et responsables; abbr. LIB·RES (Note: also abbreviated lib·res, Lib·res and Libres)) is a French-speaking political party in Belgium founded on 25 April 2025 by Olivier Maingain and his son, Fabian Maingain, as well as other members who previously left the DéFI party.

== History ==
On 20 December 2024, Olivier Maingain, who had been president of the DéFI party for 24 years and who had had numerous disagreements with the new president, Sophie Rohonyi, announced his resignation from the party. Maingain has accused Rohonyi of making DéFI dependent on Reformist Movement under her leadership and no longer protecting the autonomy of the Brussels Region, as well as several other controversies, including increasing the weight of the extreme right and populist nationalist movements. Immediately after leaving DéFI, Olivier Maingain announced the future creation of a new political party. Fabian Maingain, Olivier's son, also left DéFI on 16 April 2025.

The party's name, logo and platform were presented on 24 April 2025 by Maingain in front of journalists in the presence of his son, several colleagues from Woluwe-Saint-Lambert, where Maingain is mayor, and Marc Cools, a former MR member.

The party's logo is presented in yellow and blue, the colours of the European Union flag.

== Ideology ==
LIB·RES claims to aim to unite "French-speaking federalists, social democrats, progressive liberals, pragmatic ecologists and disillusioned humanists".

LIB·RES goals include:

- introduction of a decision-making referendum ;
- direct election of mayors;
- establishment of a single constituency ballot;
- impartiality and secularism of the State;
- defense of the Brussels Region;
- opposition to the merger of Brussels police zones and CPAS.

The party also wants properly funded social security and decent incomes, as well as a rapid exit from fossil fuels.

Sccording to RTBF journalist Himad Messoudi LIB·RES has many right-wing markers in its charter: "name of the party, libres for freedom and individual responsibility which are cardinal values; a lower corporate tax than the current average: 20%, and a reduced rate of 15% on the first €250,000 of profits for SMEs; "controlled and chosen" migration; budgetary rigor." Messoudi described Lib·res as a centre-right party, to the right of Les Engagés, comparing it to Emmanuel Macron's political position in 2014: "one who came from the left, but who wanted to overcome divisions, and ended up firmly on the right."
