= Pierre van Gobbelschroy =

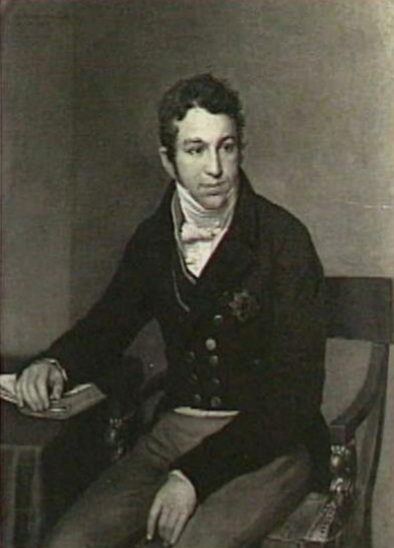

Pierre Louis Joseph Servais van Gobbelschroy (10 May 1784 – 3 October 1850) was a conservative politician of the United Kingdom of the Netherlands in the first half of the 19th century.

== Life ==
Although born in the Southern Netherlands, after the creation of the United Kingdom of the Netherlands Van Gobbelschroy was a loyal servant of King Willem I. He served as secretary to the king (1816), director of the Société Générale (1823-1830) and later as minister of the interior (1825-1830), where he was in favour of a moderate policy regarding the Catholic Church, and minister of public works, economy and colonies (1830). After the Belgian Revolution Van Gobbelschroy returned to Belgium and retired from active politics but he became one of the active leaders of the orangist movement which advocated reunification. In the 1840s Van Gobbelschroy came into economical difficulties after some business ventures folded, and he committed suicide in 1850.

== Château Malou ==
His estate was bought by the Belgian minister Jules Malou and since then has been known as the Château Malou. In 1950 it was bought by the municipality of Woluwe-Saint-Lambert. It is now protected as a historic monument, as is the 8-acre (32,000 m^{2}) park around it, and both belong to the town's historic infrastructure.

== Bibliography ==
- Vrijmoedige verhandelingen over het beruchte verslag van den minister L. van Gobbelschroy aan den koning: gedagtekend 30 januari 1829, Utrecht, 1829
- Gobbelschroy, in: Nieuw Nederlandsch Biografisch Woordenboek, deel IX, 291
- F. VAN KALKEN, Pierre van Gobbelschroy, in: Biographie nationale de Belgique, T. XXVI, Brussel, 1936–38, col. 412–416
- A. VAN ROOIJ, P.L.J.S. van Gobbelschroy, minister van binnenlandse zaken 1825–1829, Brussel, 1968 [Licentiaatsthesis VU Brussel]
- Els Witte, Het verloren koninkrijk. Het harde verzet van de Belgische orangisten tegen de revolutie. 1828–1850, Antwerpen, 2014
