= Woluwe-Saint-Lambert =

Municipality of the Brussels-Capital Region, Belgium

Woluwe-Saint-Lambert: Woluwe-Saint-Lambert (French); Sint-Lambrechts-Woluwe (Dutch)
- Municipality
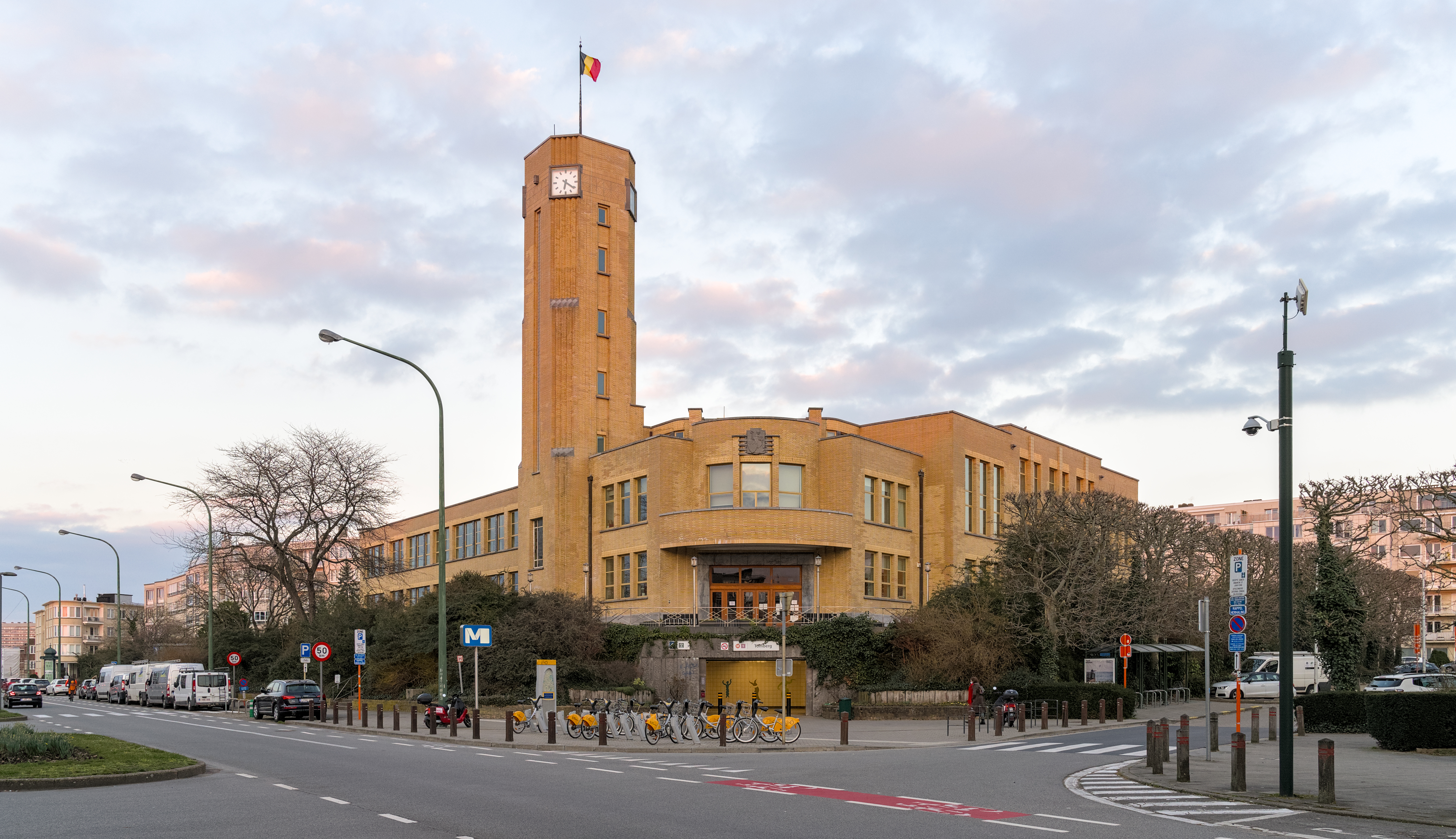
- Woluwe-Saint-Lambert's Municipal Hall

- Flag Coat of arms

- Woluwe-Saint-Lambert municipality in the Brussels-Capital Region
- Interactive map of Woluwe-Saint-Lambert
- Location in Belgium
- Coordinates: 50°50′47.824″N 04°25′53.758″E
- Country: Belgium
- Community: Flemish Community; French Community
- Region: Brussels-Capital
- Arrondissement: Brussels-Capital

Government
  - Mayor: Olivier Maingain (Lib.res)
  - Governing party: LB (Lib.res) - Les Engagés

Area
  - Total: 7.29 km^{2} (2.81 sq mi)

Population (2020-01-01)
  - Total: 57,712
  - Density: 7,920/km^{2} (20,500/sq mi)
- Postal codes: 1200
- NIS code: 21018
- Area codes: 02
- Website: fr.woluwe1200.be (in French) nl.woluwe1200.be (in Dutch)

Woluwe-Saint-Lambert (French, pronounced [wolywe sɛ̃ lɑ̃bɛʁ]) (Note: In French, it is often spelt Woluwé-Saint-Lambert (with an acute accent on the first e) to reflect the Frenchified pronunciation of what was originally a Dutch place name, but the official spelling is without an accent.) or Sint-Lambrechts-Woluwe (Dutch, pronounced [sɪnt ˈlɑmbrɛxts ˈʋoːlyu.ə]) is one of the 19 municipalities of the Brussels-Capital Region, Belgium. Like all municipalities in Brussels, it is officially bilingual (French–Dutch). The Woluwe stream, from which it takes its name, flows through the municipality.

As of 1 January 2022, the municipality had a population of 58,541 inhabitants. The total area is 7.29 km^{2} (2.81 sq mi), which gives a population density of 8,018/km^{2} (20,770/sq mi). It is a prosperous residential area, with a mixture of flats and detached, semi-detached, and terraced houses, often compared to Uccle, another affluent Brussels municipality, as well as the 14th or 17th arrondissement in Paris.

The neighbouring municipality of Woluwe-Saint-Pierre also lies within the Brussels-Capital Region, while the former municipality of Sint-Stevens-Woluwe (Woluwe-Saint-Etienne in French) has been merged with three other municipalities (Zaventem, Nossegem and Sterrebeek) to form the municipality of Zaventem, which is in the province of Flemish Brabant in Flanders.

== Geography ==
Woluwe-Saint-Lambert hosts the medical faculties of the Université catholique de Louvain (UCLouvain) and its hospital, the Cliniques universitaires Saint-Luc, on the UCLouvain Brussels Woluwe campus, as well as several shopping areas, notably the Avenue Georges Henri/Georges Henrilaan and the Woluwe Shopping Center. Some of the municipality's major roads are named after prominent 20th-century Belgian statesmen, such as the prestigious Avenue de Broqueville/De Broquevillelaan and the Avenue Paul Hymans/Paul Hymanslaan. Line 1 (formerly line 1B) of the Brussels Metro runs under these roads.

== History ==
=== Medieval origins ===
Several archaeological finds on the territory of Woluwe-Saint-Lambert show traces of human activity during the Bronze Age. The first historical mention of the village, however, dates from the 11th century, when some of the forested land near the Woluwe stream, a tributary of the Senne, was cleared for farming. A church was built and dedicated to Saint Lambert, the 7th-century bishop of Maastricht who was martyred in Liège. At the end of the 12th century, the rights to the parish of Saint Lambert were given to the canons of the chapter of St. Michael and Gudula in Brussels. Various charitable organisations and hospitals then started acquiring land in this area. Throughout the Middle Ages, Woluwe was part of the Duchy of Brabant, governed under the usual feudal arrangement of those times. Among the dukes' vassals were some powerful local lords and landowners. Some of Woluwe's territory also belonged to the powerful Forest Abbey in Forest and Park Abbey in Leuven.

=== 16th century to present ===
Up until recently, the village was mostly rural, focusing mainly on agriculture. Starting in the 16th century, affluent nobles and clergymen from Brussels built châteaux in Woluwe, some of which are still visible today. True urbanisation, however, started only around 1900. Well-to-do neighbourhoods, which included some of the novel architectural styles of the Belle Époque, such as Art Nouveau then Art Deco, straddled the newly built Boulevard Brand Whitlock/Brand Whitlocklaan.

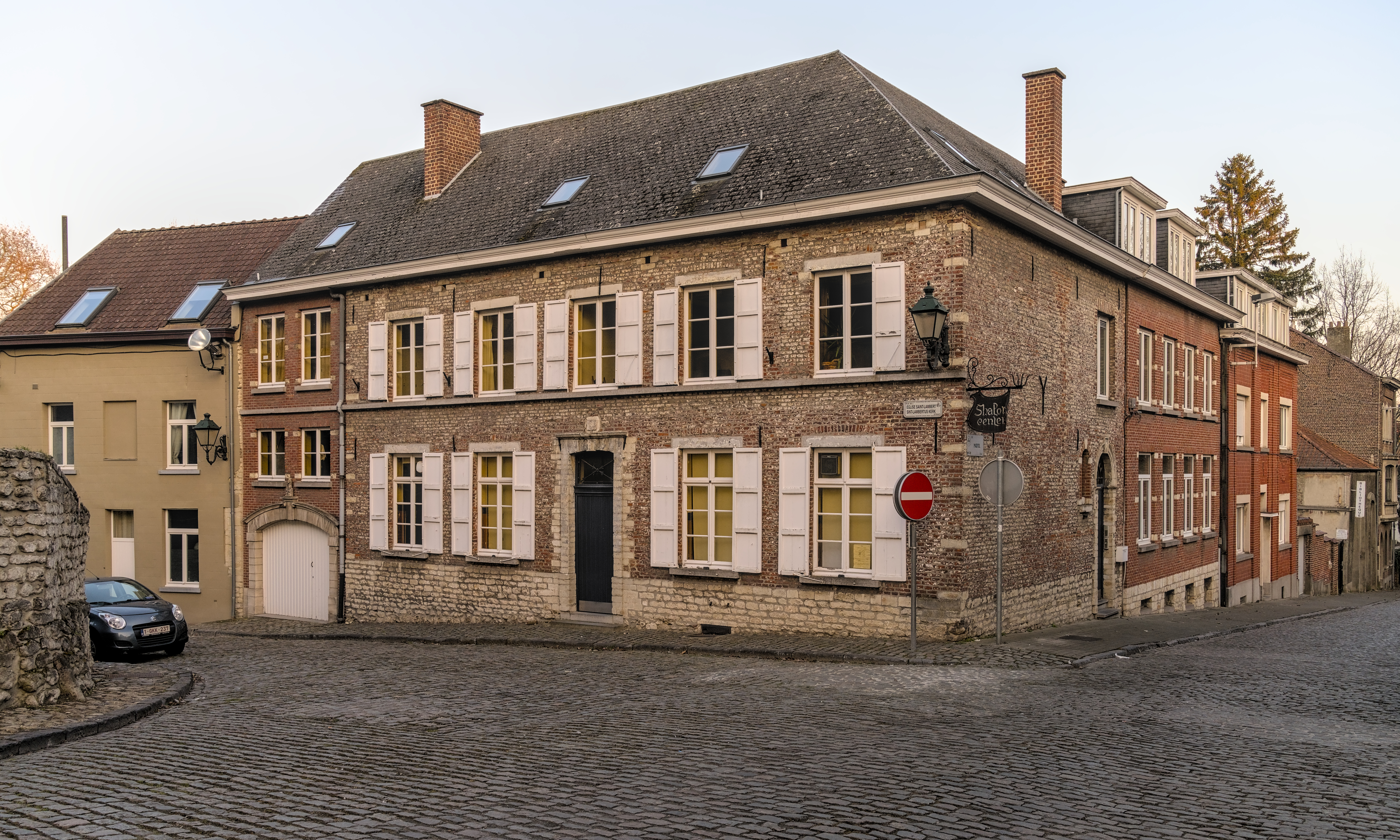
Former Municipal Hall (1852–1939)

The municipality's population increased very quickly at this time, rising from 1,649 inhabitants in 1880 to 8,883 inhabitants 30 years later. By 1960, there were 36,960 inhabitants, and since 1970, the population has been stable at around 47,000.

Nowadays, Woluwe-Saint-Lambert is still a mostly residential municipality, attracting Brussels' rich and poor inhabitants.

== Sights ==
- The surroundings of the Woluwe stream have been laid out as park areas, such as Woluwe Park (in neighbouring Woluwe-Saint-Pierre) and Malou Park. Older historical buildings, such as the Lindekemale Mill (now a restaurant), the Hof ter Musschen farm (now a seminar centre), and the 16th-century Slot Castle (now a chain restaurant), also tend to be found near the river.
- The Church of St. Lambert has a 12th-century Romanesque tower.
- The Chapel of Mary the Miserable (14th century).
- The municipality's Art Deco Municipal Hall, built in the 1930s, is located above Tomberg metro station.
- The Wolubilis cultural village and theatre, located at 1, cours Paul Henri Spaak/Henri-Spaak promenade (formerly 251, avenue Paul Hymans/Paul Hymanslaan), were inaugurated in 2006.
- The neoclassical Château Malou, built in 1776.
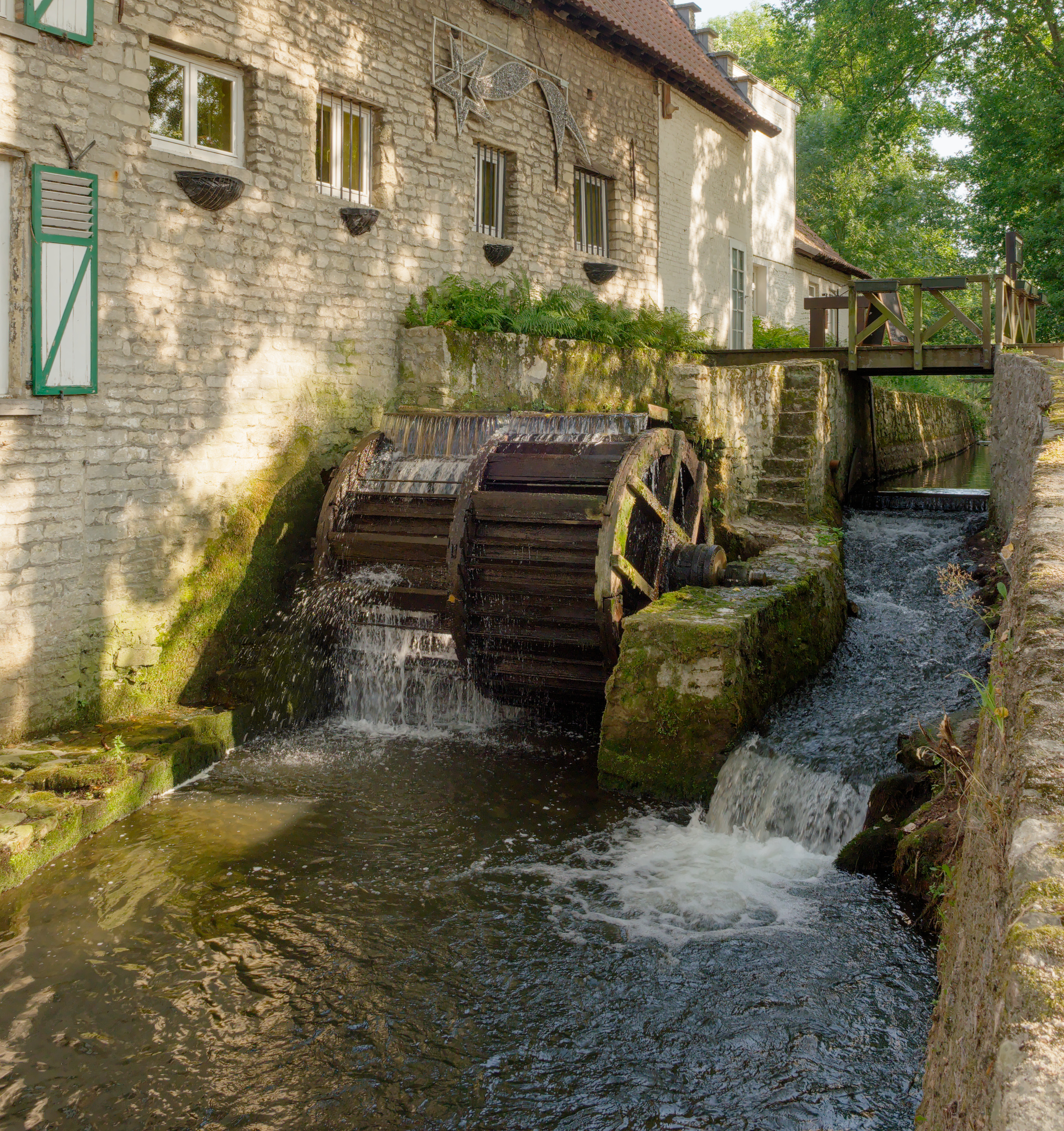
Lindekemale Mill

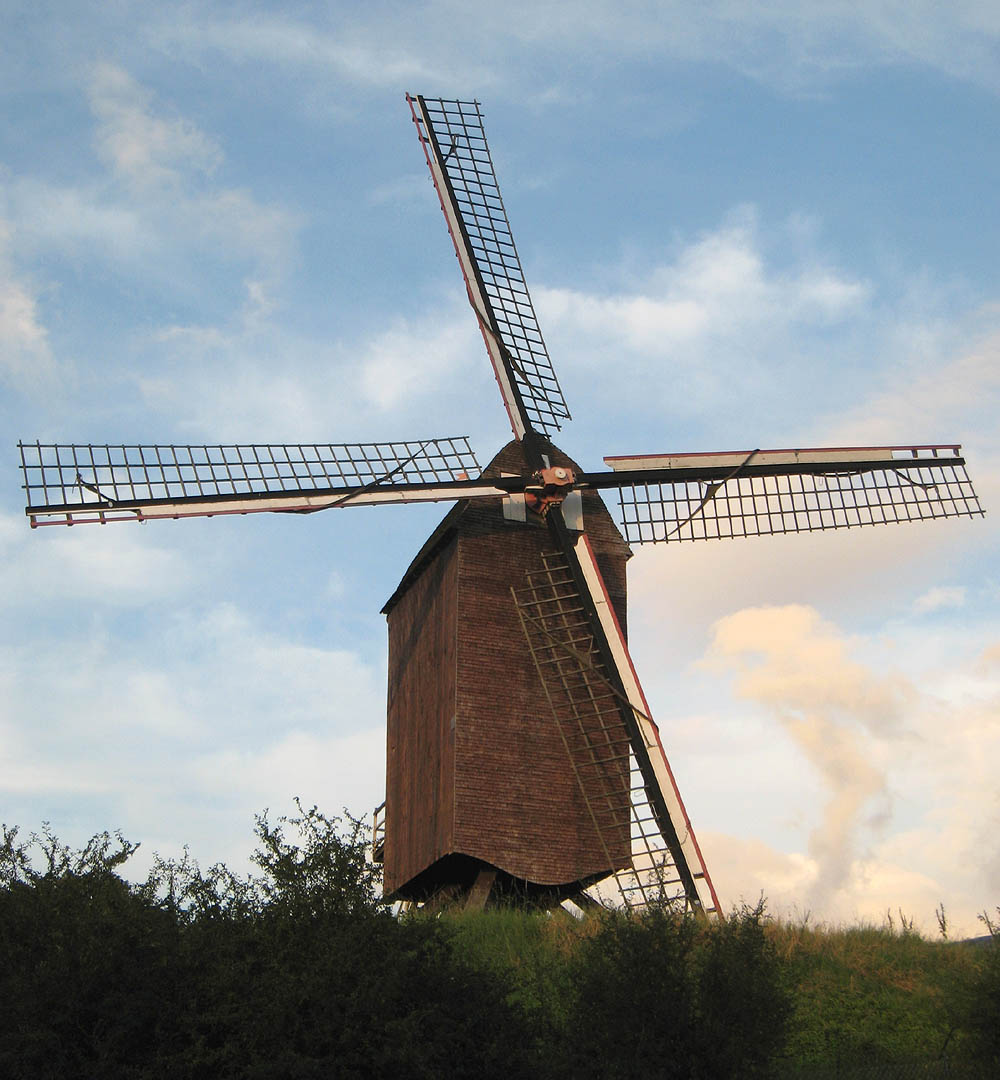
Windmill near the Hof ter Musschen farm

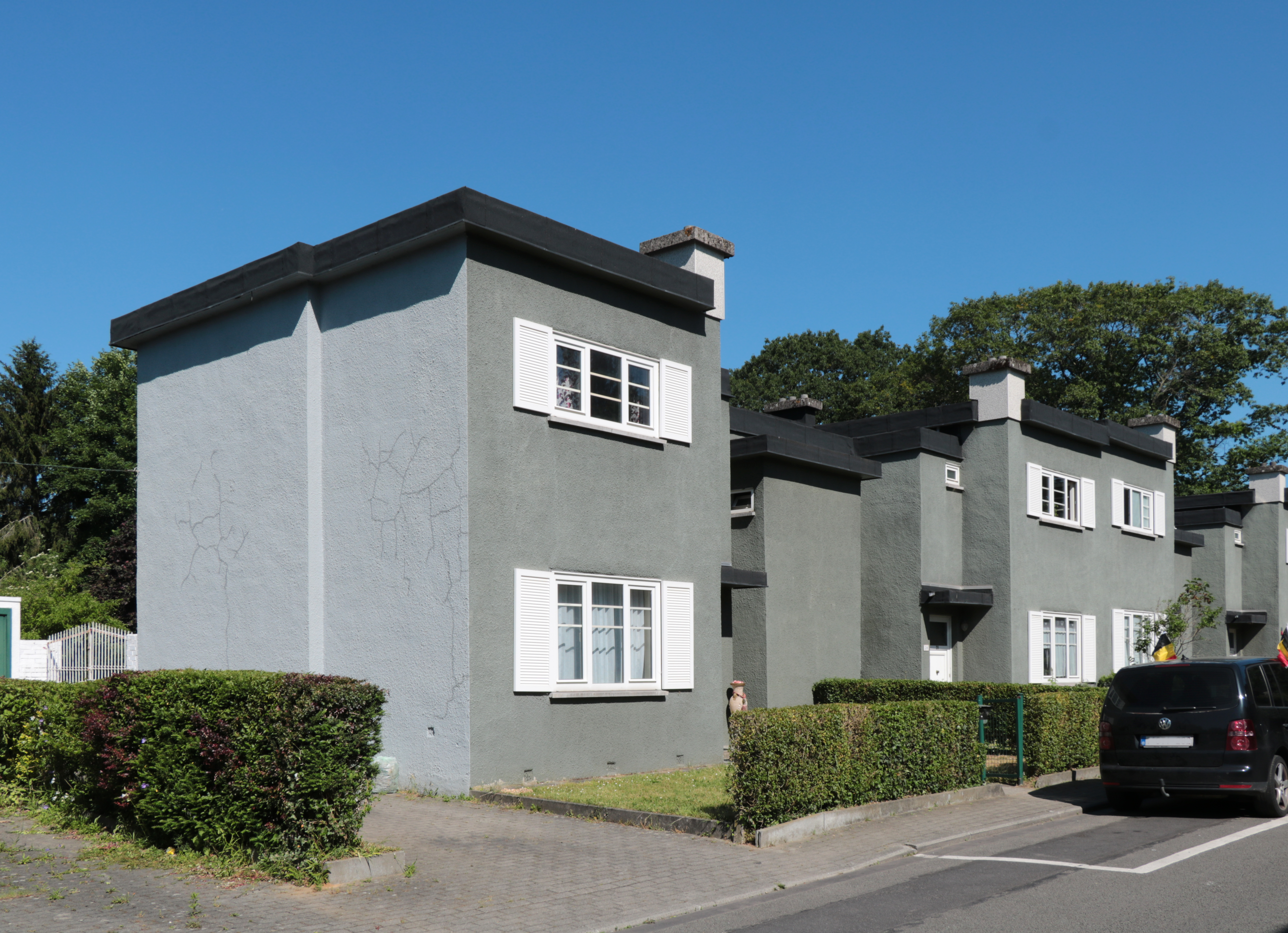
Kapelleveld garden city

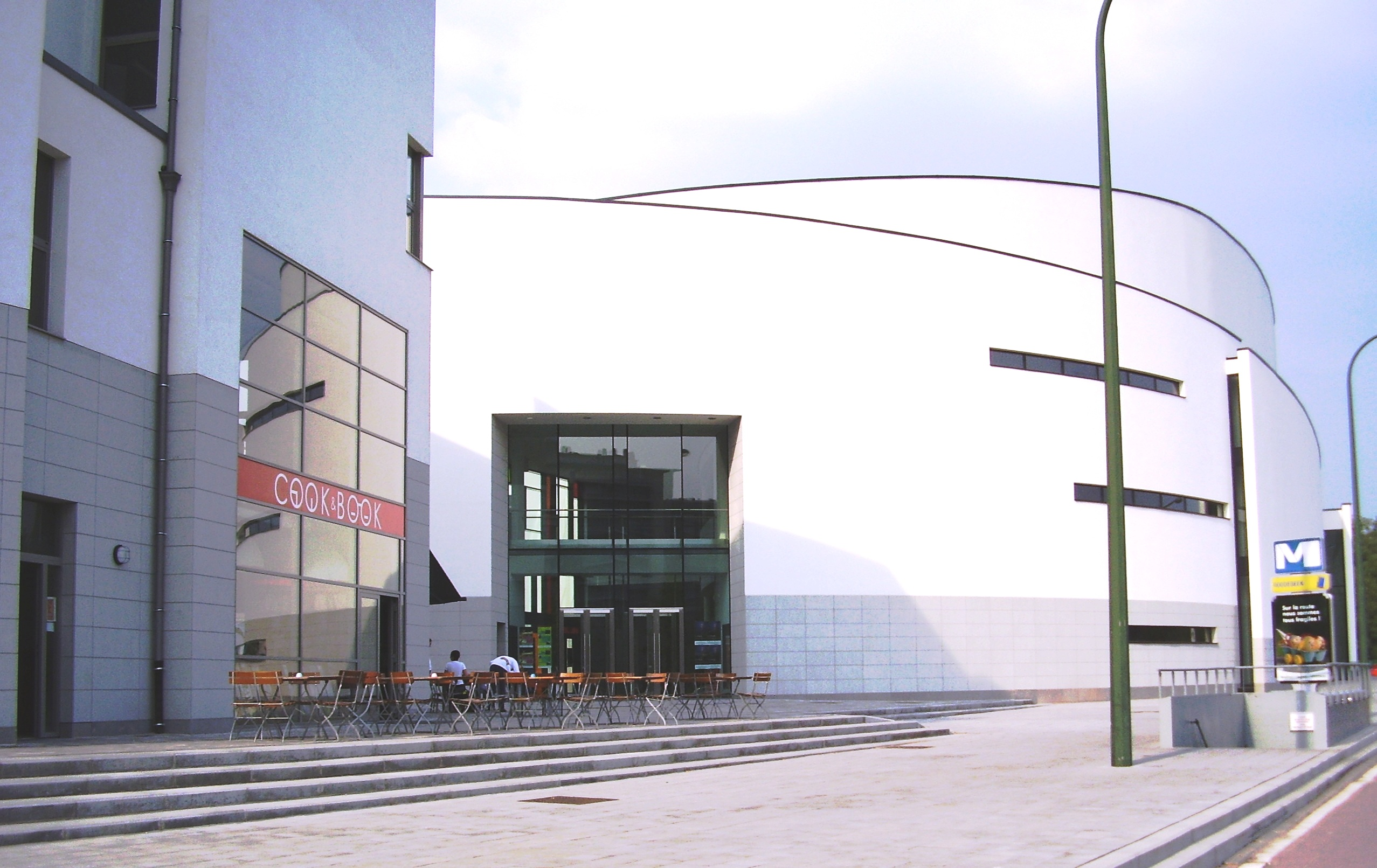
Wolubilis

== Shopping ==
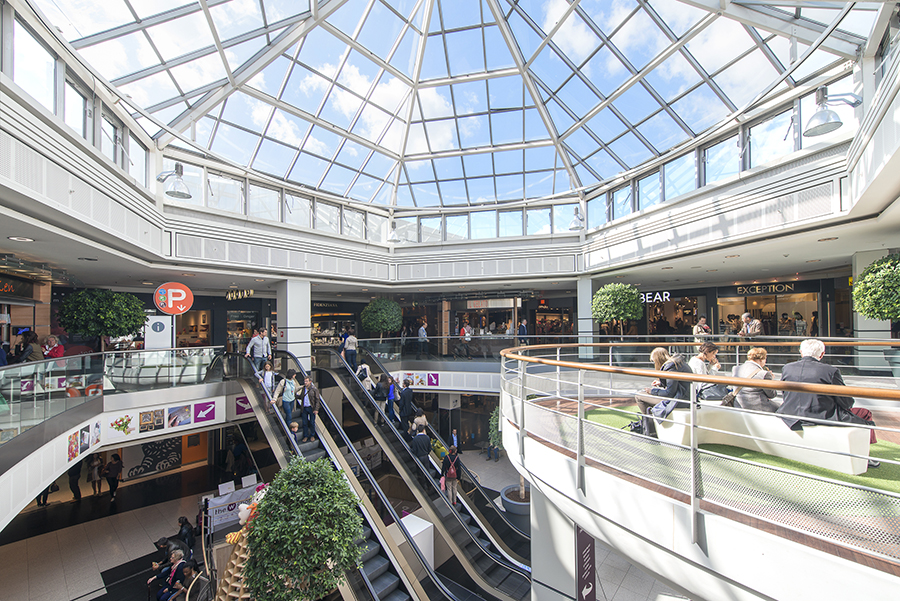
Roof of Woluwe Shopping Center

Woluwe-Saint-Lambert has many shopping streets around Tomberg and Gribaumont metro stations. Around Roodebeek station is one of Brussels' largest shopping centres: the Woluwe Shopping Center. The shopping centre opened in 1968 and has two floors and a surface area of around 97 m^{2} (1,040 sq ft). The Woluwe Shopping Center serves most of eastern Brussels.

== Transport ==
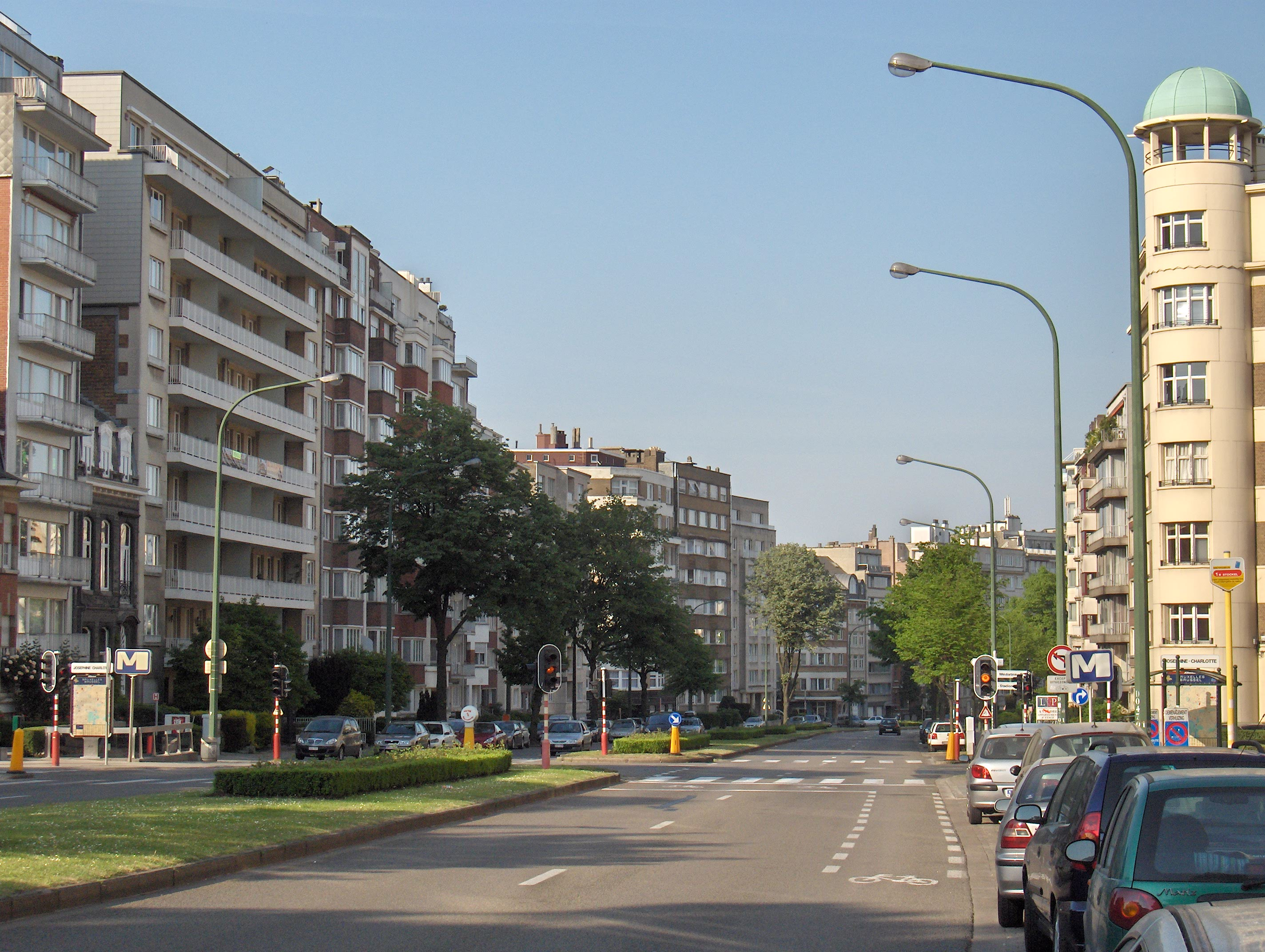
Avenue de Broqueville/De Broquevillelaan

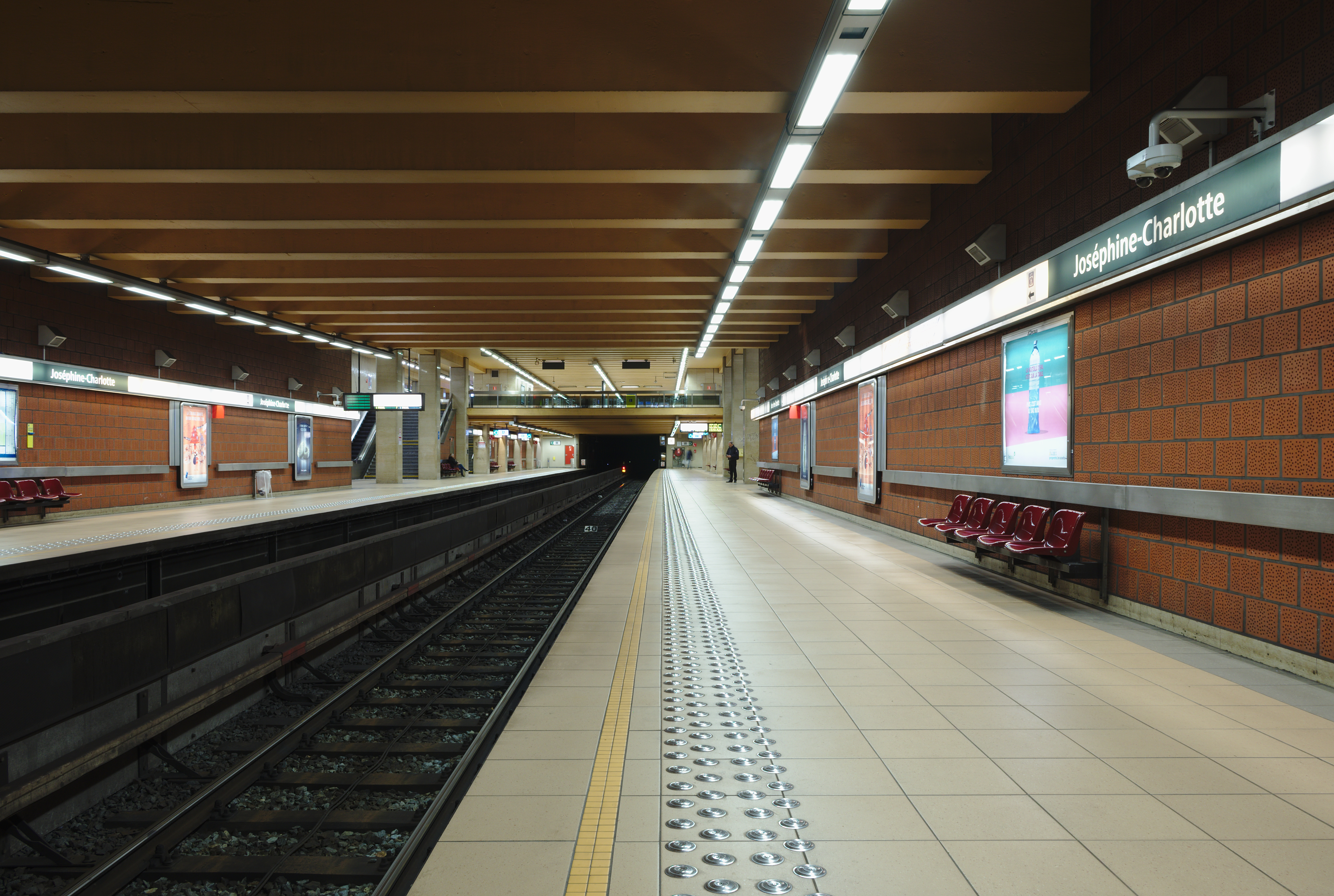
Joséphine-Charlotte metro station

Woluwe-Saint-Lambert is served by the following stations on line 1 of the Brussels Metro: Joséphine-Charlotte, Gribaumont, Tomberg, Roodebeek, Vandervelde, Alma and Crainhem/Kraainem. Despite not having any rail connections, the E40 Motorway, as well as many bus routes, run through the municipality. Since 2018, tram 94 has been extended from Musée du Tram/Trammuseum to Roodebeek and has been renamed as tram 8.

== Education ==
In 1974, following the Leuven crisis, the Université catholique de Louvain (UCLouvain) moved its faculties of the Sector of Medical Sciences to the municipality, creating Brussels' second largest campus, UCLouvain Bruxelles Woluwe, with more than 14,000 students. It also founded a new hospital on site, the Cliniques universitaires Saint-Luc. The site includes a number of other educational institutions, such as the Haute école Léonard de Vinci and the École pratique des hautes études commerciales (EPHEC).

Schools include:

- European School of Brussels II
- Don Bosco Middle School
- Athenée Royale de Woluwe-Saint-Lambert

== Notable inhabitants ==
- Jules Malou (1810–1886), statesman and Prime Minister
- Tarec Saffiedine (born 1986), martial artist
- Georges Remi, also known as Hergé (1907–1983), comic book author, creator of The Adventures of Tintin

Born in Woluwe-Saint-Lambert:

- Prince Amedeo, Princess Maria Laura and Prince Joachim, born at the Cliniques universitaires Saint-Luc in 1986, 1988 and 1991, respectively.
  - Rem: Princess Luisa Maria, and Princess Laetitia Maria were born in the Clinique Saint-Jean in Brussels in 1995, and 2003, respectively.
- Princess Louise and twins Prince Nicolas and Prince Aymeric, born at the Cliniques universitaires Saint-Luc in 2004 and 2005, respectively.
- Vincent Debaty (born 1981), French rugby union footballer
- Twins Jonathan Borlée and Kevin Borlée, and their older sister Olivia Borlée, athletes
- Luca Van Assche (born 2004), French tennis player

== International relations ==
=== Twin towns and sister cities ===
Woluwe-Saint-Lambert is twinned with:

- Meudon, France
- Mbazi, Rwanda

== See also ==
- Woluwe-Saint-Pierre (Sint-Pieters-Woluwe), an adjacent municipality
- Sint-Stevens-Woluwe, a district of an adjacent municipality
- White Star Woluwe F.C.
