= Joséphine-Charlotte metro station =

Metro station in Brussels, Belgium

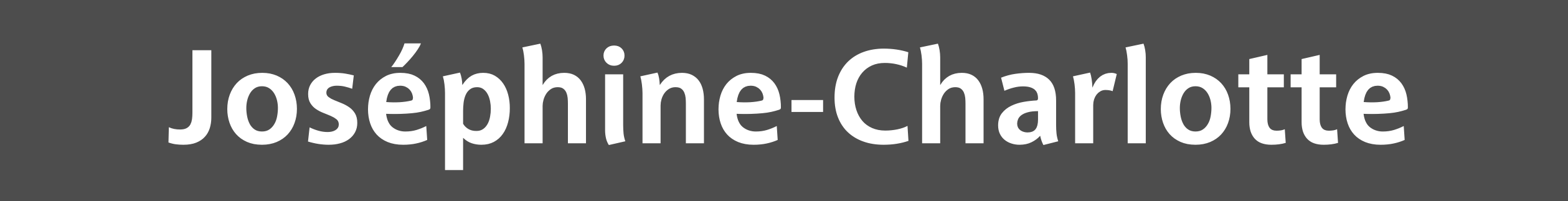

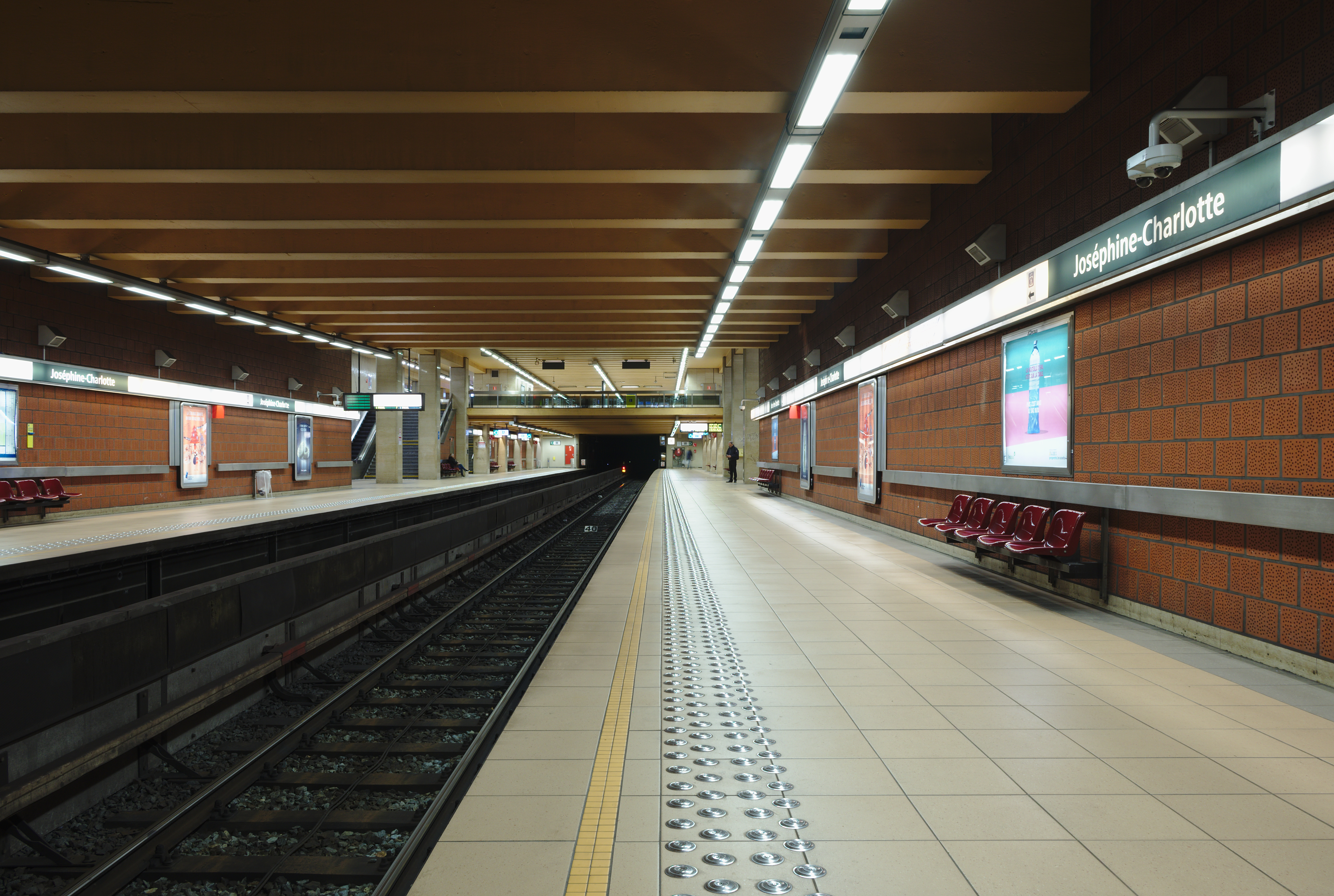
- Joséphine-Charlotte metro station

General information
- Location: Avenue de Broqueville / De Broquevillelaan; 1200 Woluwe-Saint-Lambert, Brussels-Capital Region, Belgium
- Coordinates: 50°50′24″N 4°24′46″E
- Owner: STIB/MIVB
- Platforms: 2
- Tracks: 2

Construction
- Structure type: Underground

History
- Opened: 20 September 1976; 49 years ago

Services
Preceding station	Brussels Metro	Following station
Montgomery towards Gare de l'Ouest/Weststation	Line 1	Gribaumont towards Stockel/Stokkel
Location

Joséphine-Charlotte (French pronunciation: [ʒozefin ʃaʁlɔt]) is a Brussels Metro station on the eastern branch of line 1. It is located in the municipality of Woluwe-Saint-Lambert, in the eastern part of Brussels, Belgium. The station is located entirely below the Avenue de Broqueville/De Broquevillelaan. The station, like the green square adjacent to its entrance, is named after Grand Duchess Joséphine-Charlotte of Luxembourg (born Princess of Belgium).

The metro station opened on 20 January 1976. Since 4 April 2009, the station has been served by the eastern branch of line 1 (previously line 1B).

In late 2008, the original Pavimento Pirelli black rubber flooring on the platforms was replaced with new biscuit-coloured terrazzo floor tiles.

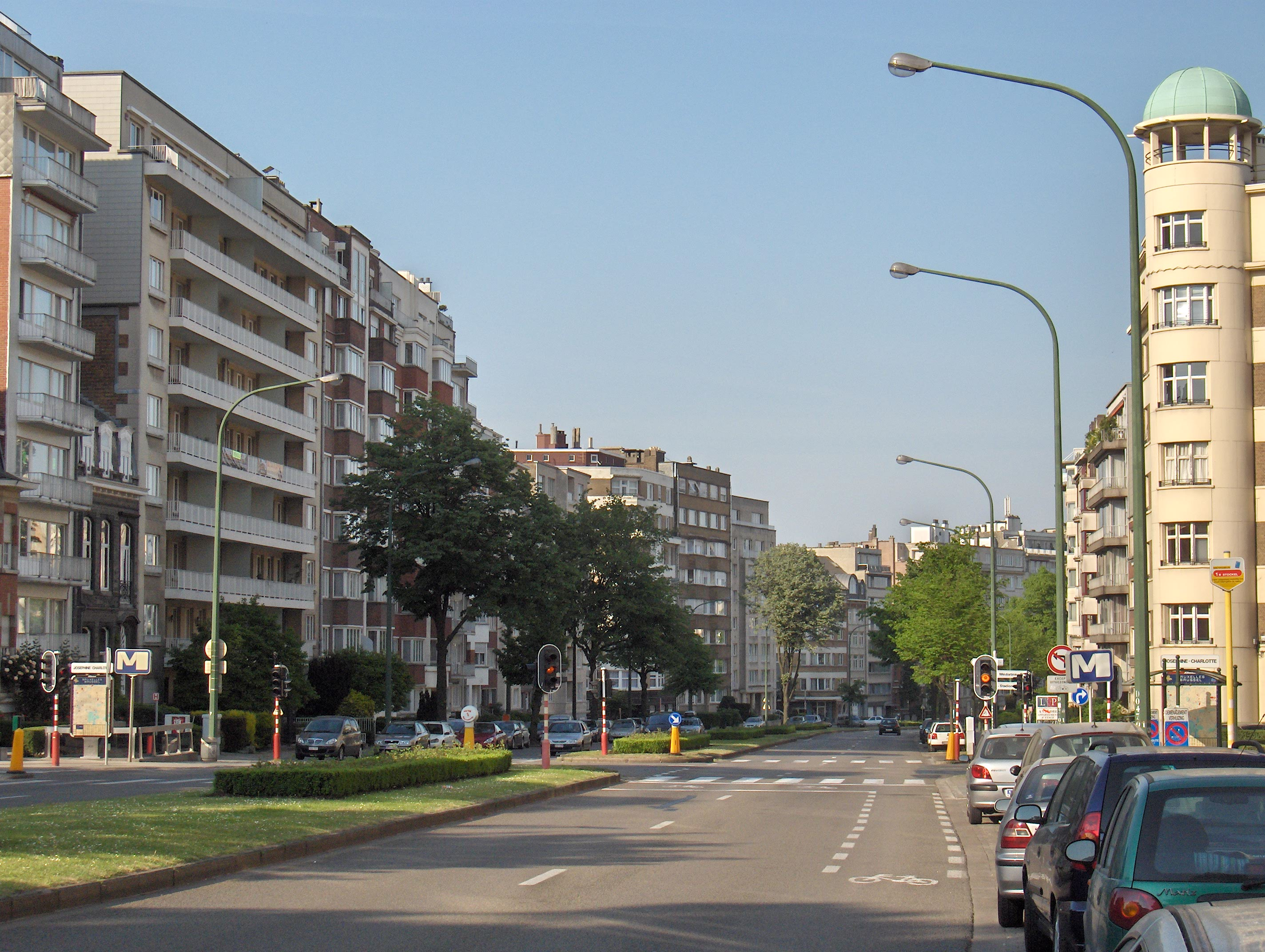
Entrances on the Avenue de Broqueville/De Broquevillelaan marked with "M" logo signs

== See also ==
- Transport in Brussels
- History of Brussels
