= Woluwe =

Stream in Brussels, Belgium

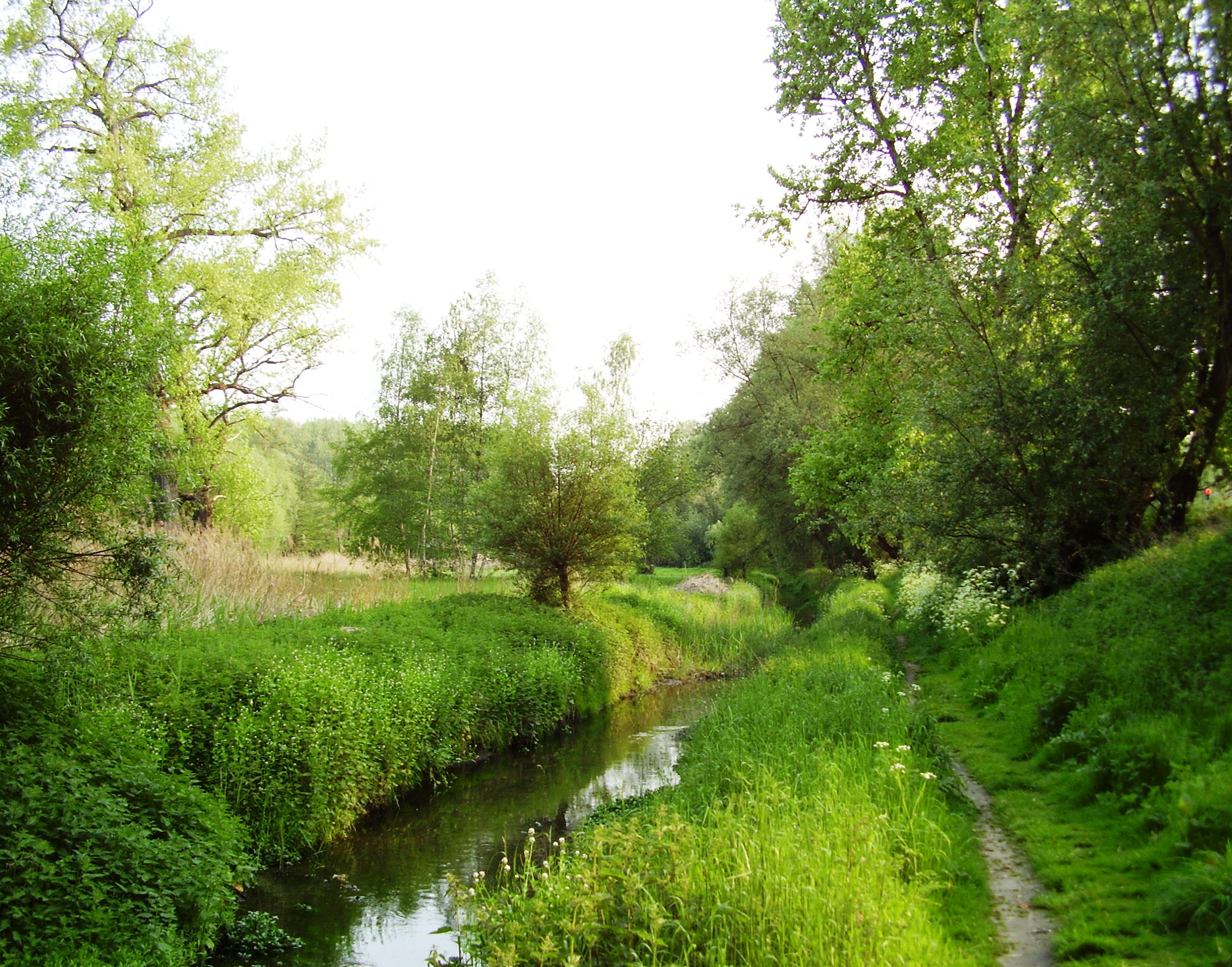
- The Woluwe in Woluwe-Saint-Lambert

Location
- Country: Belgium

Physical characteristics
- Mouth: Senne
  - coordinates: 50°53′N 4°27′E
- Length: 17.3 km (10.7 mi)

Basin features
- Progression: Senne→ Dyle→ Rupel→ Scheldt→ North Sea

The Woluwe (French: [wolywe]; Dutch: [ˈʋoːlyu.ə]) is a stream that flows through several municipalities in the south-east and east of Brussels, Belgium, and is a right tributary of the Senne in Vilvoorde. The Kleine (little) Maalbeek is a tributary of the Woluwe in Kraainem. Many ponds formed along the stream over time, among which the Mellaerts Ponds still exist. The valley of the Woluwe crosses the municipalities of Auderghem, Watermael-Boitsfort, Woluwe-Saint-Pierre, Woluwe-Saint-Lambert, Kraainem, Zaventem, Machelen and Vilvoorde.

The towns of Woluwe-Saint-Pierre, Woluwe-Saint-Lambert and Sint-Stevens-Woluwe derive their name from it.

== See also ==
- List of rivers of Belgium
- UCLouvain Brussels Woluwe
