= Art Nouveau in Brussels =

Local implementation of a style of architecture and design

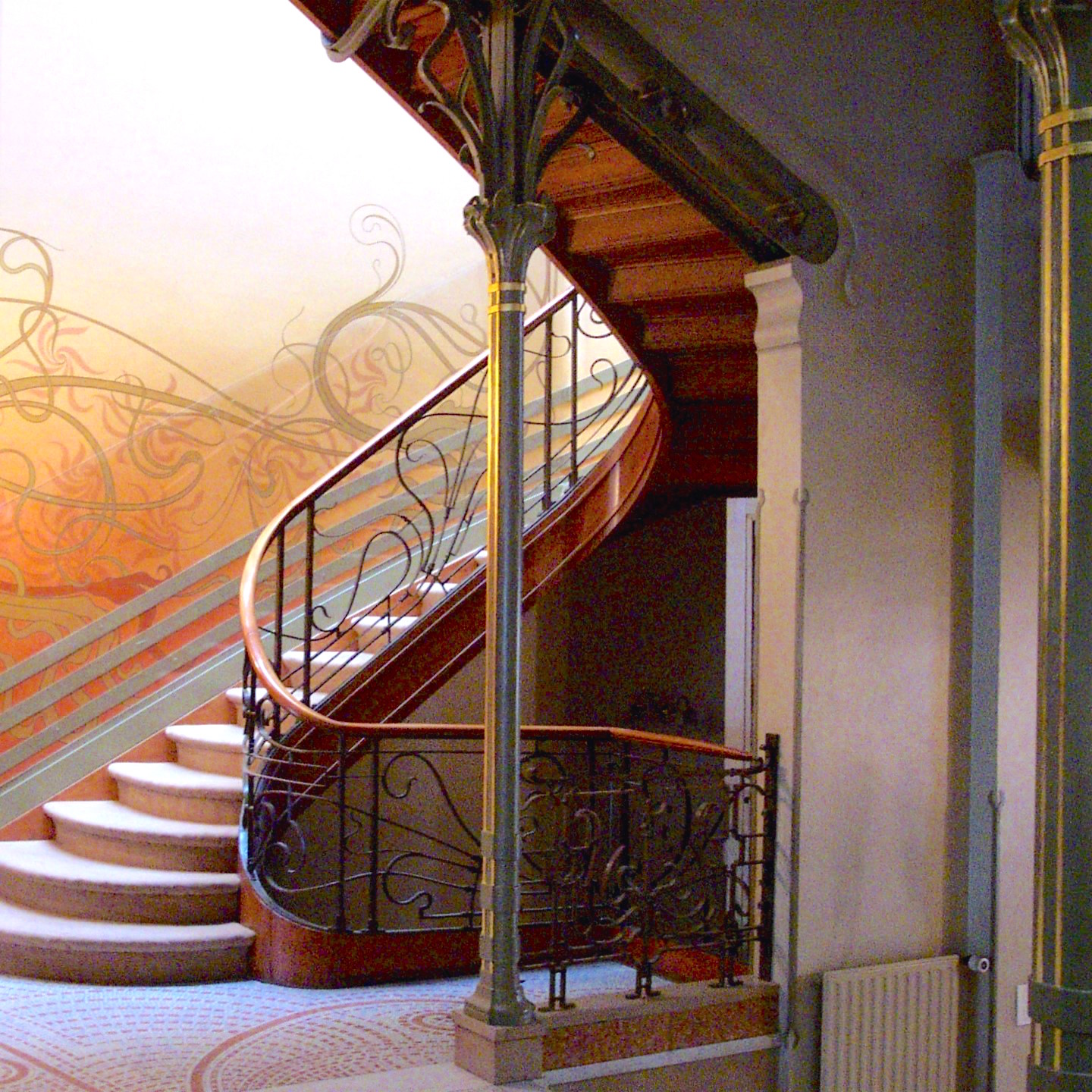
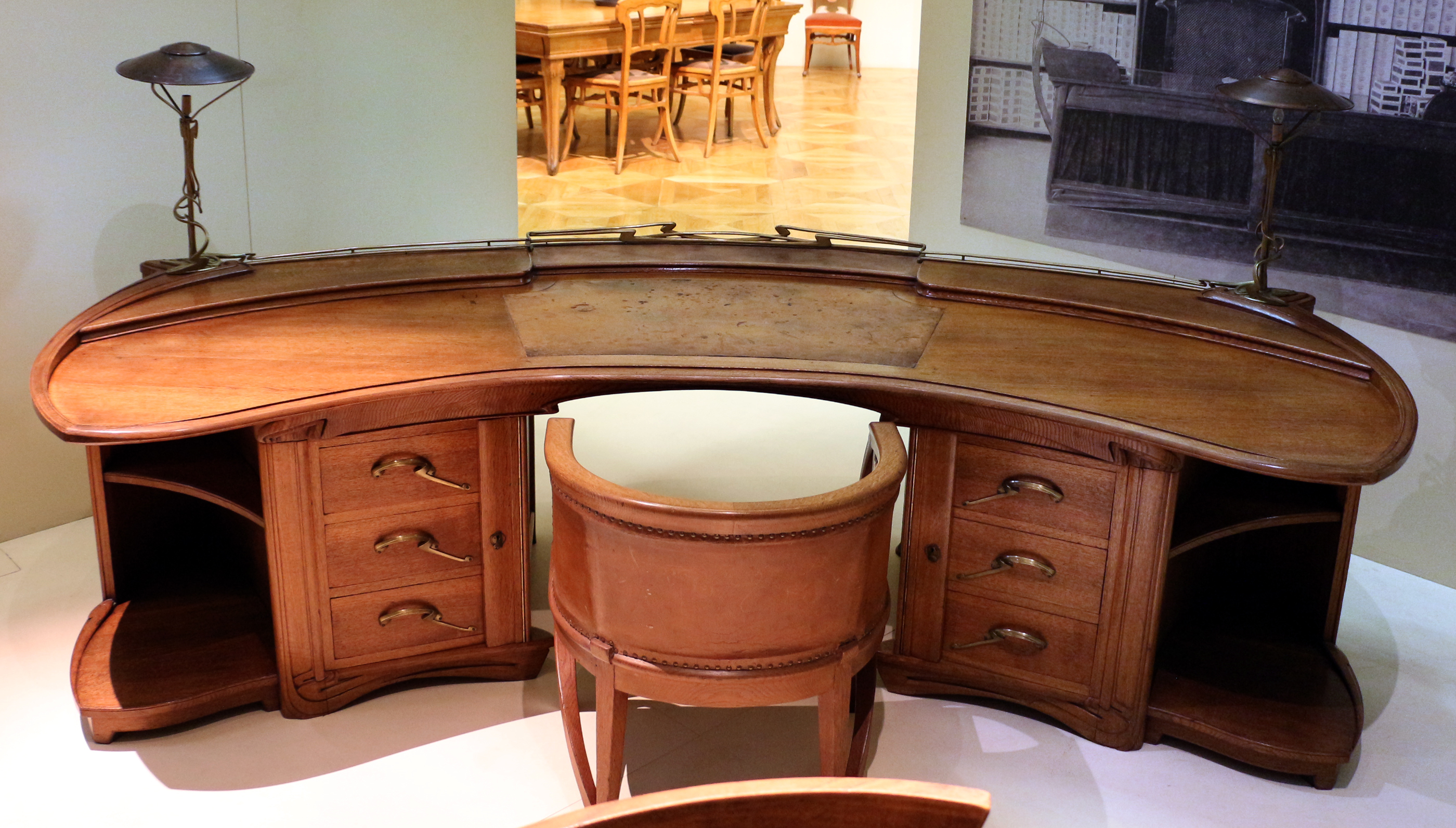
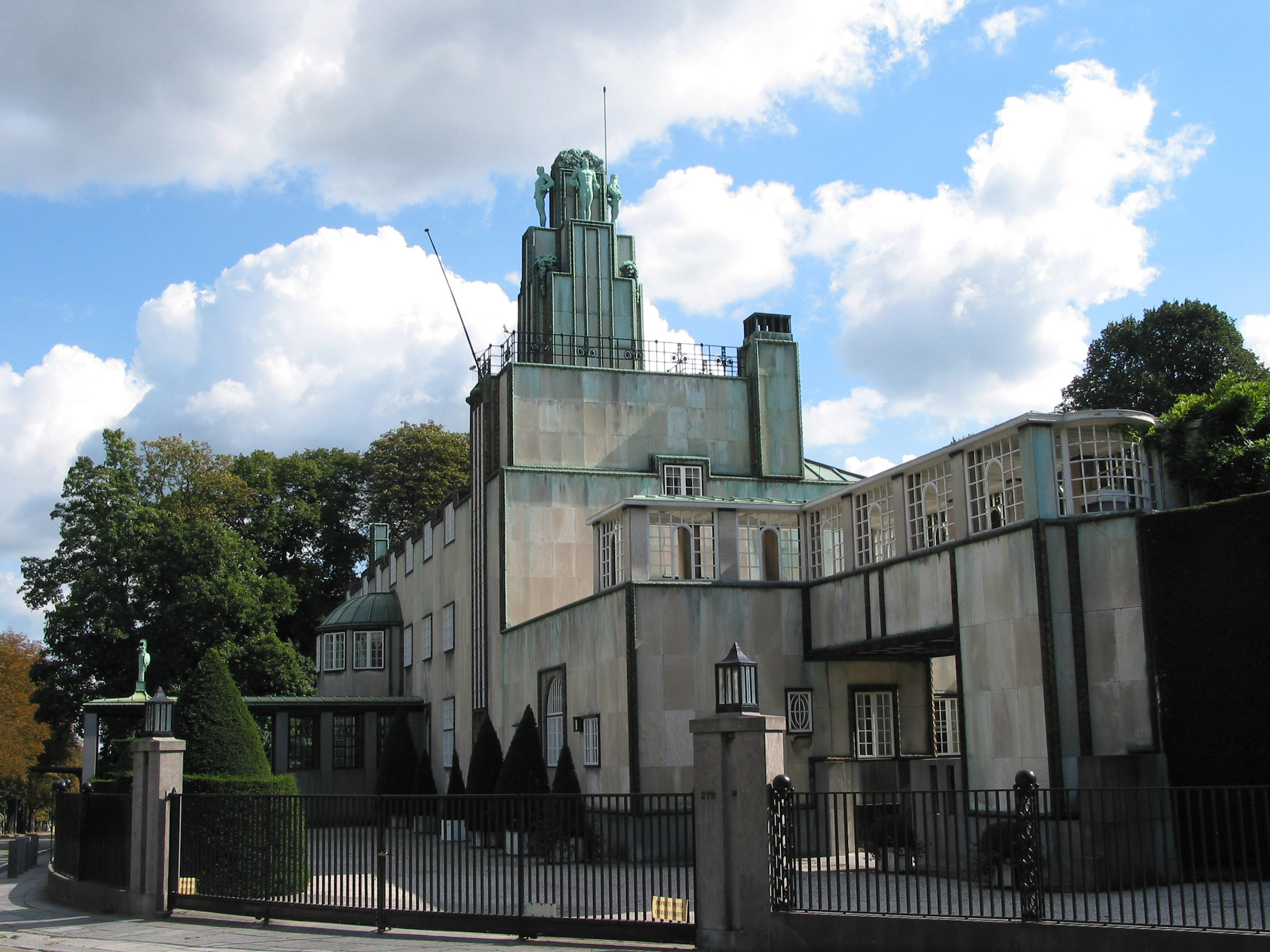
- Top: Hôtel Tassel by Victor Horta (1893); Centre: Desk by Henry Van de Velde (1898); Bottom: Stoclet Palace by Josef Hoffmann (1905–1911)
- Years active: c. 1890–1910
- Location: Belgium

The Art Nouveau movement of architecture and design first appeared in Brussels, Belgium, in the early 1890s, in the architecture and interior design of houses designed by Paul Hankar, Henry van de Velde, and especially Victor Horta, whose Hôtel Tassel was completed in 1893. It began as a reaction against the formal vocabulary of 19th-century European academic art, eclecticism and historicism, and was based upon an innovative use of new materials, such as iron and glass, to open larger interior spaces and provide maximum light; curving lines such as the whiplash line; and other designs inspired by plants and other natural forms.

The early Art Nouveau designers in Brussels created not only art and architecture but also furniture, glassware, carpets, and even clothing and other decoration to match. Some of Brussels' municipalities, such as Schaerbeek, Etterbeek, Ixelles, and Saint-Gilles, were developed during the heyday of Art Nouveau and have many buildings in that style. From Brussels, the movement quickly spread to France and to the rest of Europe.

After 1900, the style gradually became more formal and geometric. The final Art Nouveau landmark in Brussels was the Stoclet Palace (1905–1911) by the Viennese architect Josef Hoffmann, now a UNESCO World Heritage Site, which marked the transition to a more geometric and formal style and the birth of Art Deco and early modernism. Brussels' city planning free-for-all, between the end of the Second World War and the late 1970s, known as Brusselisation, lead to the destruction of notable Art Nouveau landmarks, most famously Horta's Maison du Peuple/Volkshuis. In spite of this, many Art Nouveau buildings still survive today.

== Architecture ==
=== Paul Hankar ===
The first two Art Nouveau houses in Brussels were built at the same time, in 1892–93, by the architects and designers Paul Hankar and Victor Horta respectively. They were similar in their originality, but very different in their design and appearance. Hankar (1859–1901), the son of a master stone cutter, had studied ornamental sculpture and decoration at the Royal Academy of Fine Arts in Brussels from 1873 to 1884, whilst working as an ornamental sculptor. From 1879 to 1894, he worked in the studio of the architect Henri Beyaert, a master of eclectic and neoclassical architecture. Through Beyaert, Hankar became an admirer of Eugène Viollet-le-Duc, the French architect who advocated the use of innovative new materials such as iron and glass, while drawing from historical architecture for inspiration.

In 1893, Hankar designed and built the Hankar House, his own residence, at 71, rue Defacqz/Defacqzstraat, in the Saint-Gilles municipality of Brussels. To decorate it, he brought together the talents of several of his artist friends, including the sculptor René Janssens and the painter Albert Ciamberlani, who adorned the façade with sgraffiti, or layers of plaster tinted in pastel colours onto a moistened surface, a technique popular in Renaissance Italy in the 15th and 16th centuries. The façade and balconies featured iron decoration and curling lines in stylised floral patterns, which became an important feature of Art Nouveau. Based on this model, he built several houses for his artist friends, including Janssens, Ciamberlani (Hôtel Albert Ciamberlani), the designer, silversmith and jeweller Philippe Wolfers, as well as the painter Léon Bartholomé. He also designed a series of innovative glass display windows for Brussels shops, of which one, the former Chemiserie Niguet, at 13, rue Royale/Koningsstraat in central Brussels, still survives.

In 1897, Hankar designed one more important project: he was the artistic director for the International Exposition held in Tervuren, near Brussels, which featured works by the major Belgian Art Nouveau artists, including Gustave Serrurier-Bovy, Henry Van de Velde, and George Hobé. He died in January 1901 at the age of 41, but his style influenced the work of younger Brussels' artists, including Paul Hamesse, Léon Sneyers, Antoine Pompe and the modernist Victor Bourgeois.

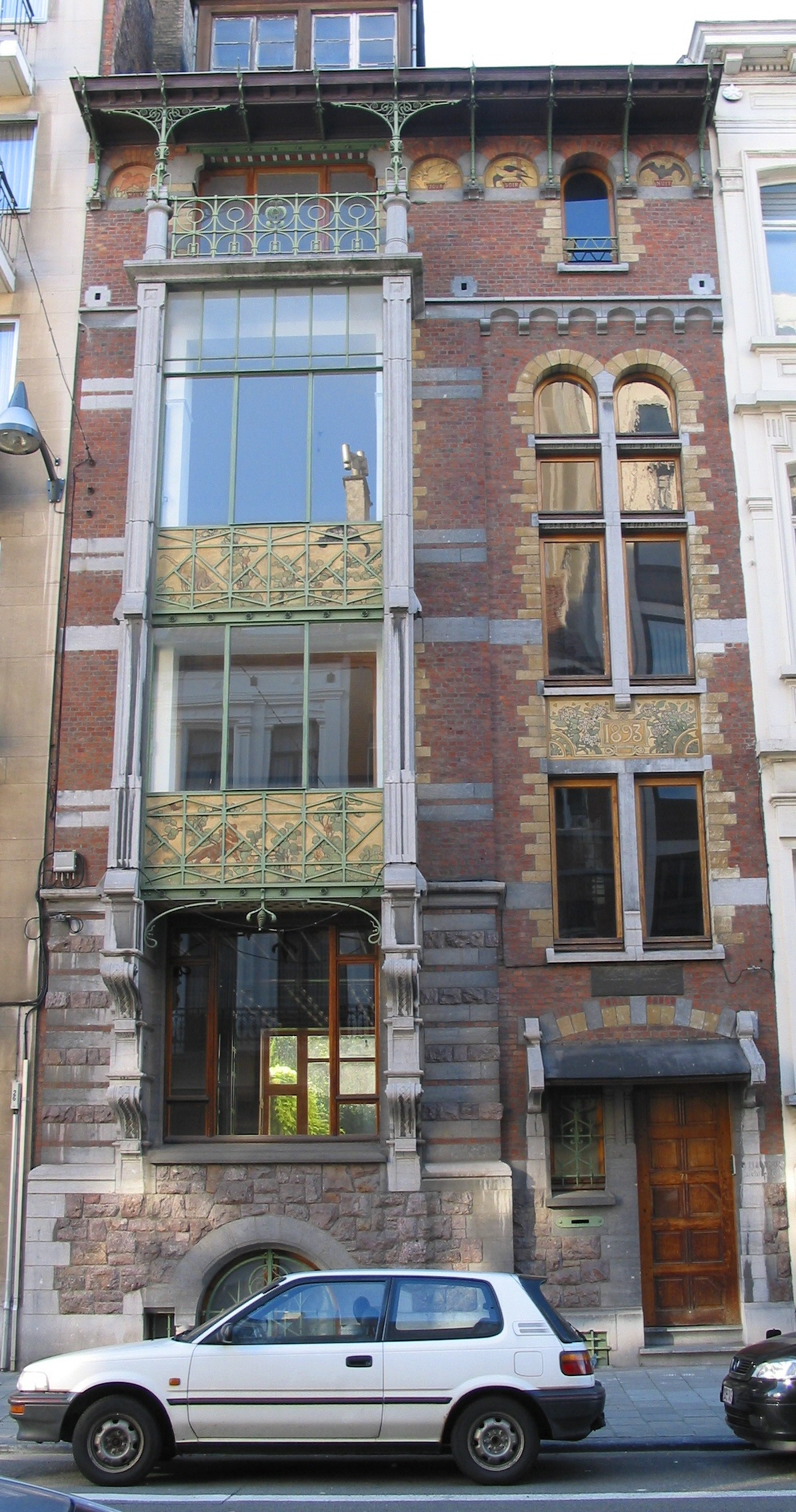
Façade of the Hankar House by Paul Hankar (1893)

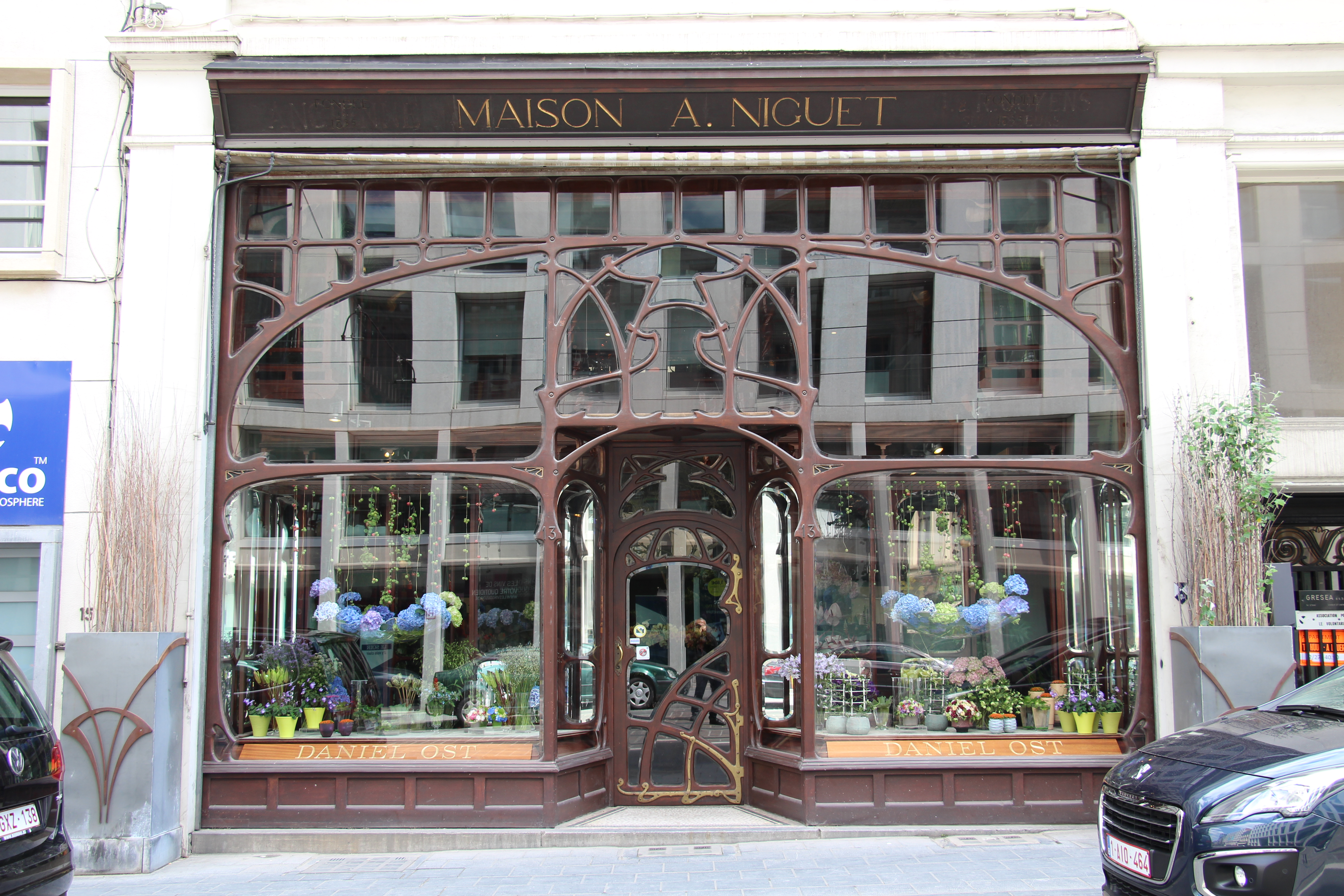
Former Chemiserie Niguet storefront on the Rue Royale/Koningsstraat by Hankar (1896)

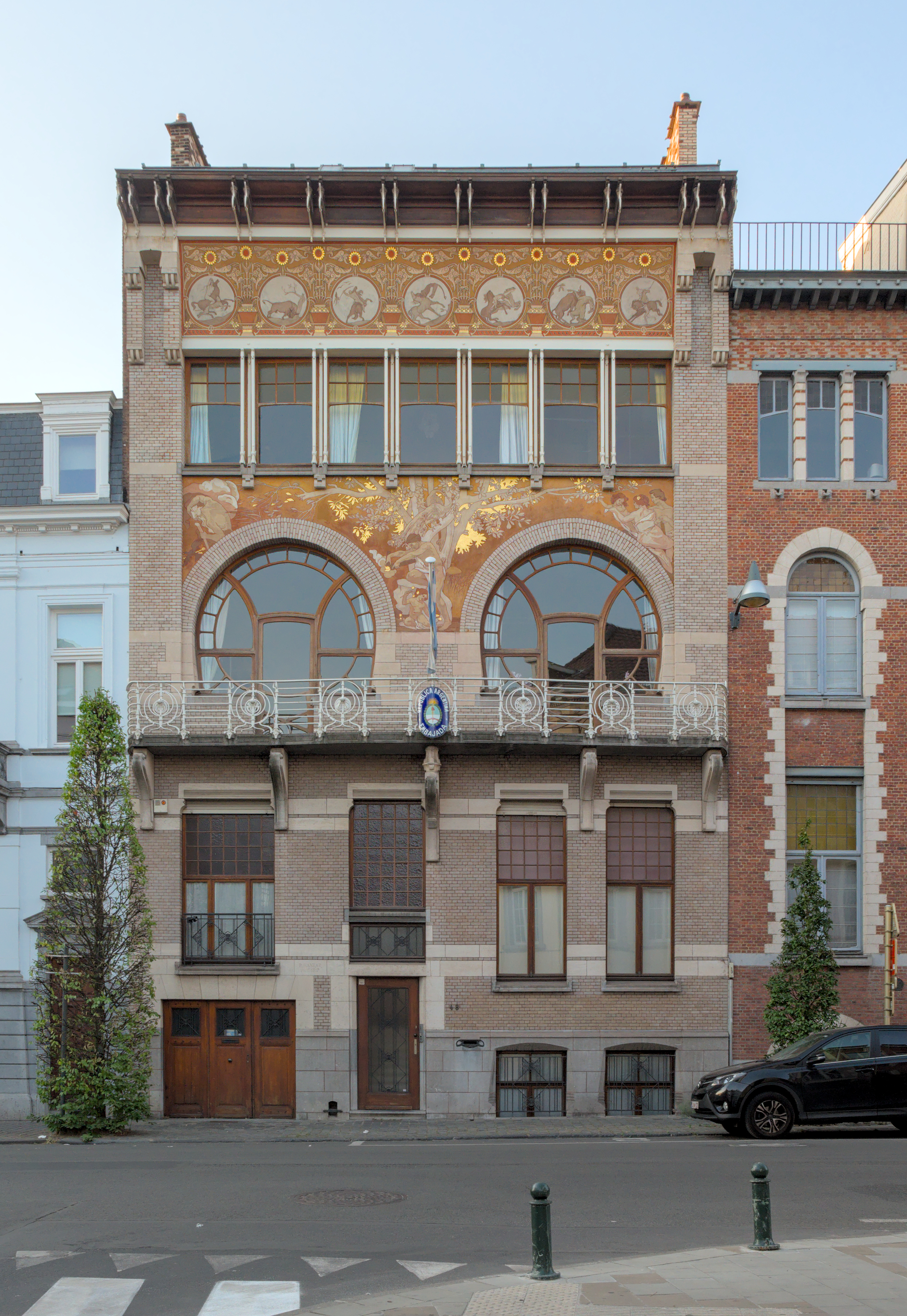
Hôtel Albert Ciamberlani by Hankar, with sgraffito murals (1897–98)

=== Victor Horta ===
At the same time Hankar was working on his house, Victor Horta (1861–1947) was building a very different kind of Art Nouveau house in Brussels, the Hôtel Tassel, for the scientist and professor Émile Tassel. Horta, born in Ghent, was the son of a shoemaker, who had studied architecture at the Royal Academy of Fine Arts in Ghent, then at the Academy of Fine Arts in Brussels. He subsequently worked for the neoclassical architect Alphonse Balat, who was in the midst of constructing the enormous glass and iron Royal Greenhouses of Laeken in northern Brussels for King Leopold II. As his assistant, Horta learned how to use glass, iron, and later steel, materials he used skilfully in all of his later buildings.

==== Hôtel Tassel (1892–93) ====
The Hôtel Tassel, completed in 1893, was on a relatively narrow lot, and the façade, designed to harmonise with the neighbouring buildings, was well-crafted but not revolutionary. The extraordinary part was the interior, designed with an open floor plan, and with an innovative use of iron columns and glass windows and skylights, and of decoration, to create a new idea of interior space. The house was built around an open central stairway. The interior decoration featured curling lines, modelled after vines and flowers, which were repeated in the ironwork railings of the stairway, in the tiles of the floor, in the glass of the doors and skylights, and painted on the walls. The building is widely recognised as one of the first appearances of Art Nouveau in architecture (along with the Hankar House by Paul Hankar, built at the same time). In 2000, it was designated, along with three other town houses designed soon afterwards, as a UNESCO World Heritage Site. In designating these sites, UNESCO explained: "The stylistic revolution represented by these works is characterised by their open plan, the diffusion of light, and the brilliant joining of the curved lines of decoration with the structure of the building."

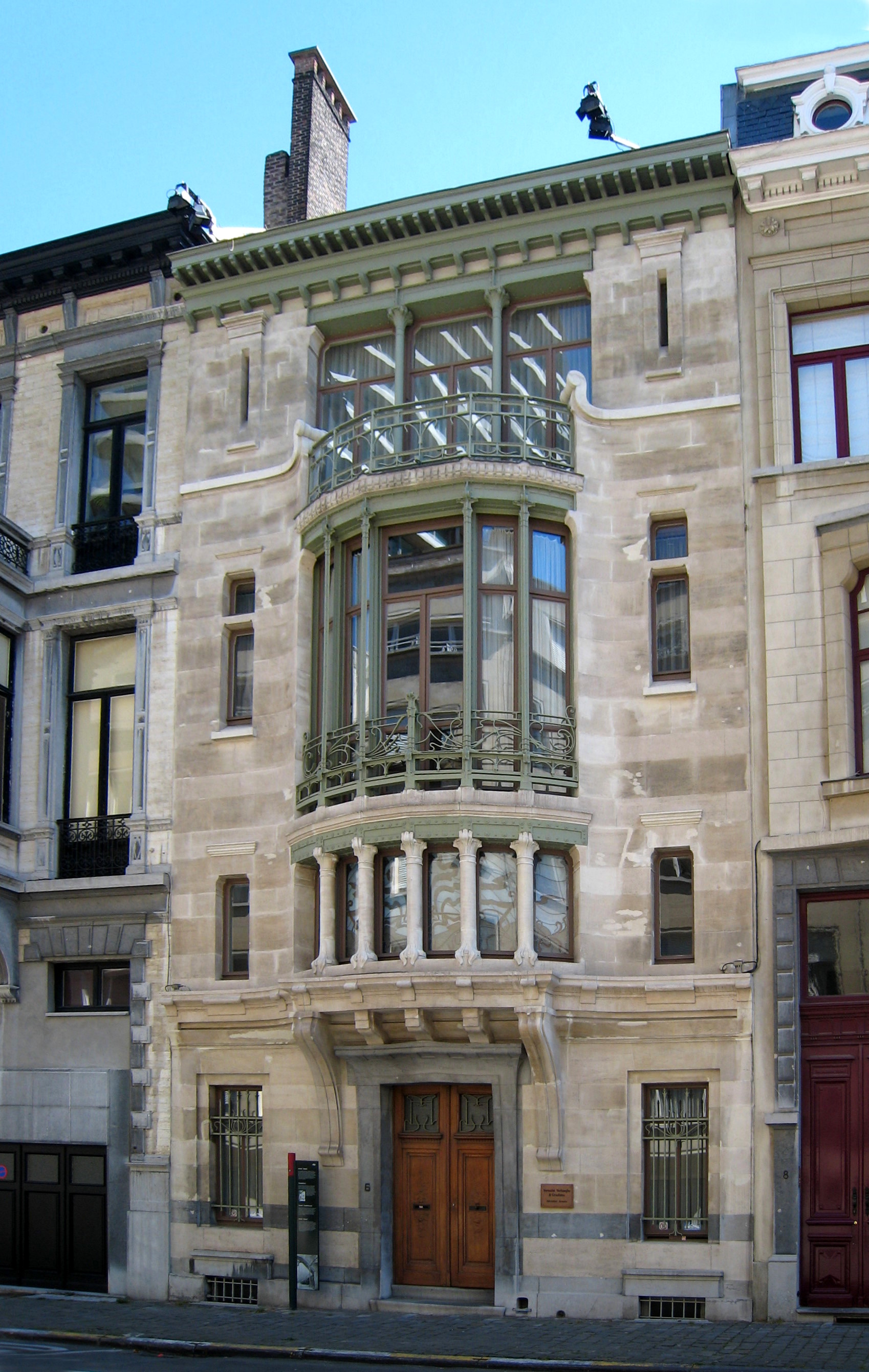
Façade of the Hôtel Tassel by Victor Horta (1892–93)

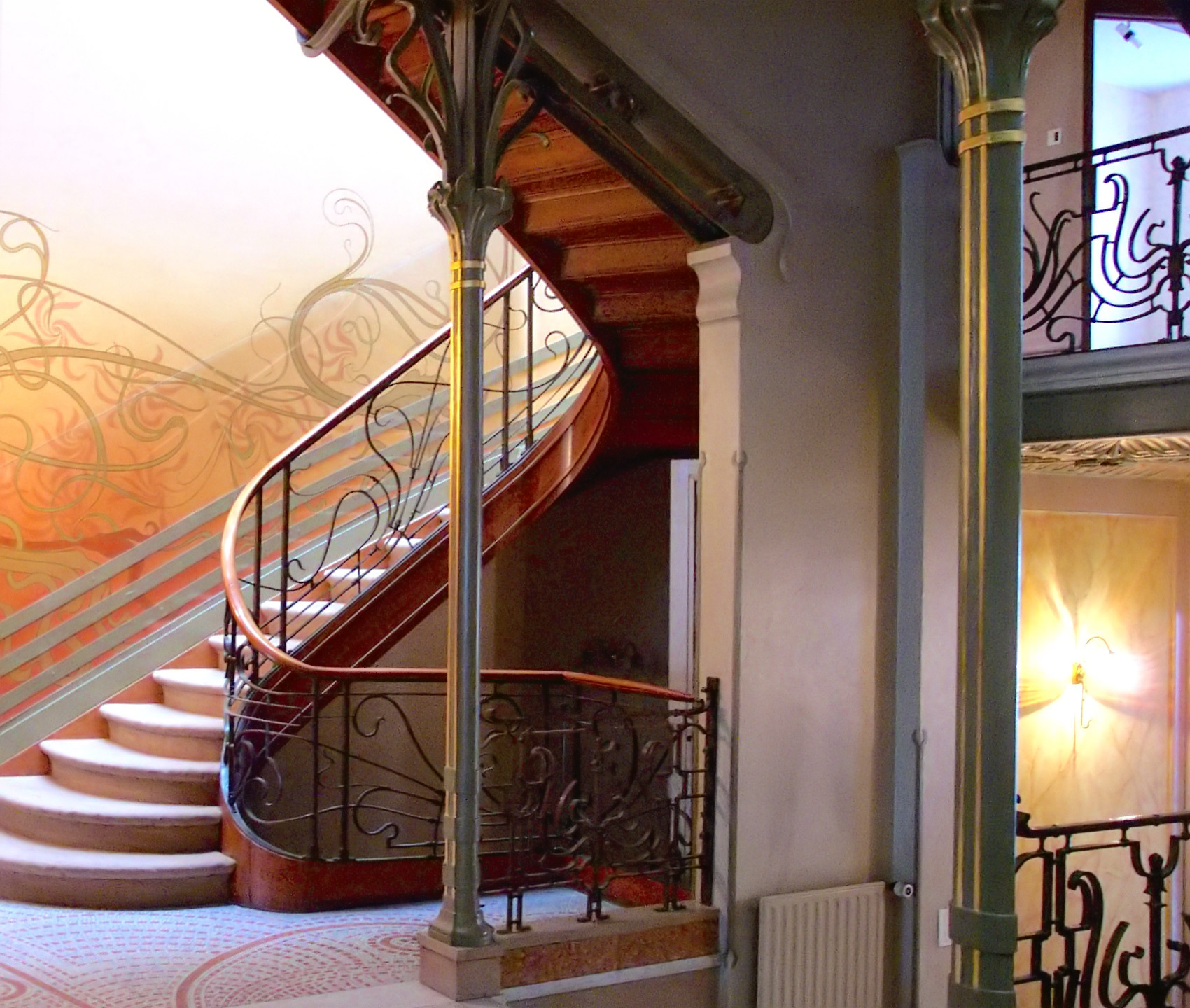
Stairway of the Hôtel Tassel

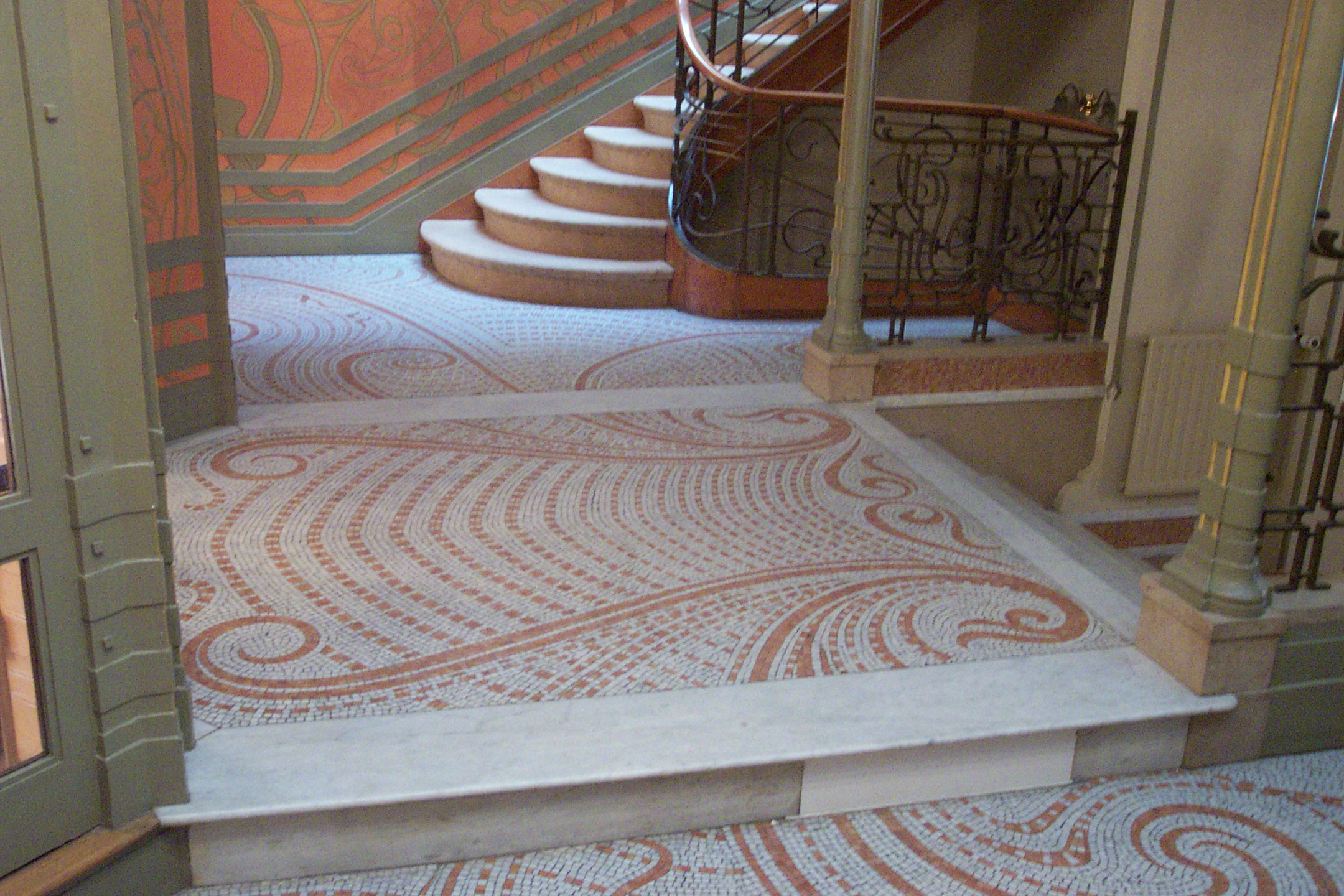
Floor of the Hôtel Tassel, with the characteristic curling vegetal design

==== Other works ====
Horta built several more town houses in variations of the style, each with its own original character. They include the Hôtel Winssinger (1895–96), the Hôtel Deprez-Van de Velde (1895–96), the Hôtel Solvay (1895–1900), the Hôtel van Eetvelde (1895–1901), and the Hôtel Aubecq (1900), as well as his own residence (1898–1901), which is now the Horta Museum. He applied the same original combination of a steel frame, open plan, skylights and functional features, without the decoration and luxury materials, for several larger buildings, including the headquarters of the Belgian Workers' Party (POB/BWP) or Maison du Peuple/Volkshuis (built in 1896–1899, and demolished in 1965). He also designed several commercial buildings, including the À L'Innovation department store (1901), which burnt down in 1967 (see L'Innovation department store fire), as well as a large fabric store, the Magasins Waucquez (1905–06), which is now the Belgian Comic Strip Center.

After about 1910, Art Nouveau features gradually disappeared from Horta's work, as his style evolved into a fusion of neoclassicism and early modernism. Major later buildings include the Centre for Fine Arts, as well as Brussels-Central railway station, which he began in 1910 and was still working on when he died in 1947.

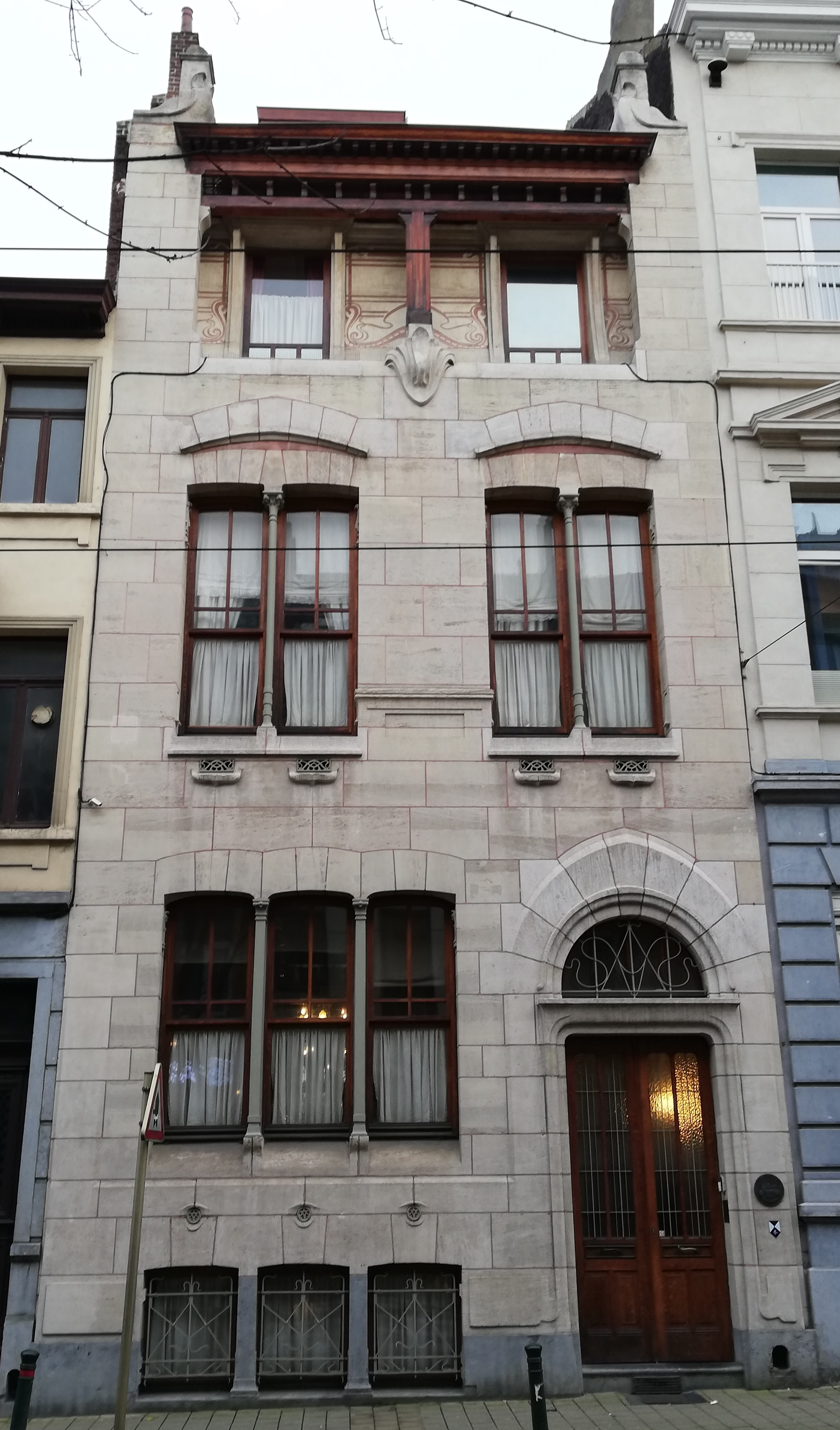
Autrique House by Victor Horta (1893)

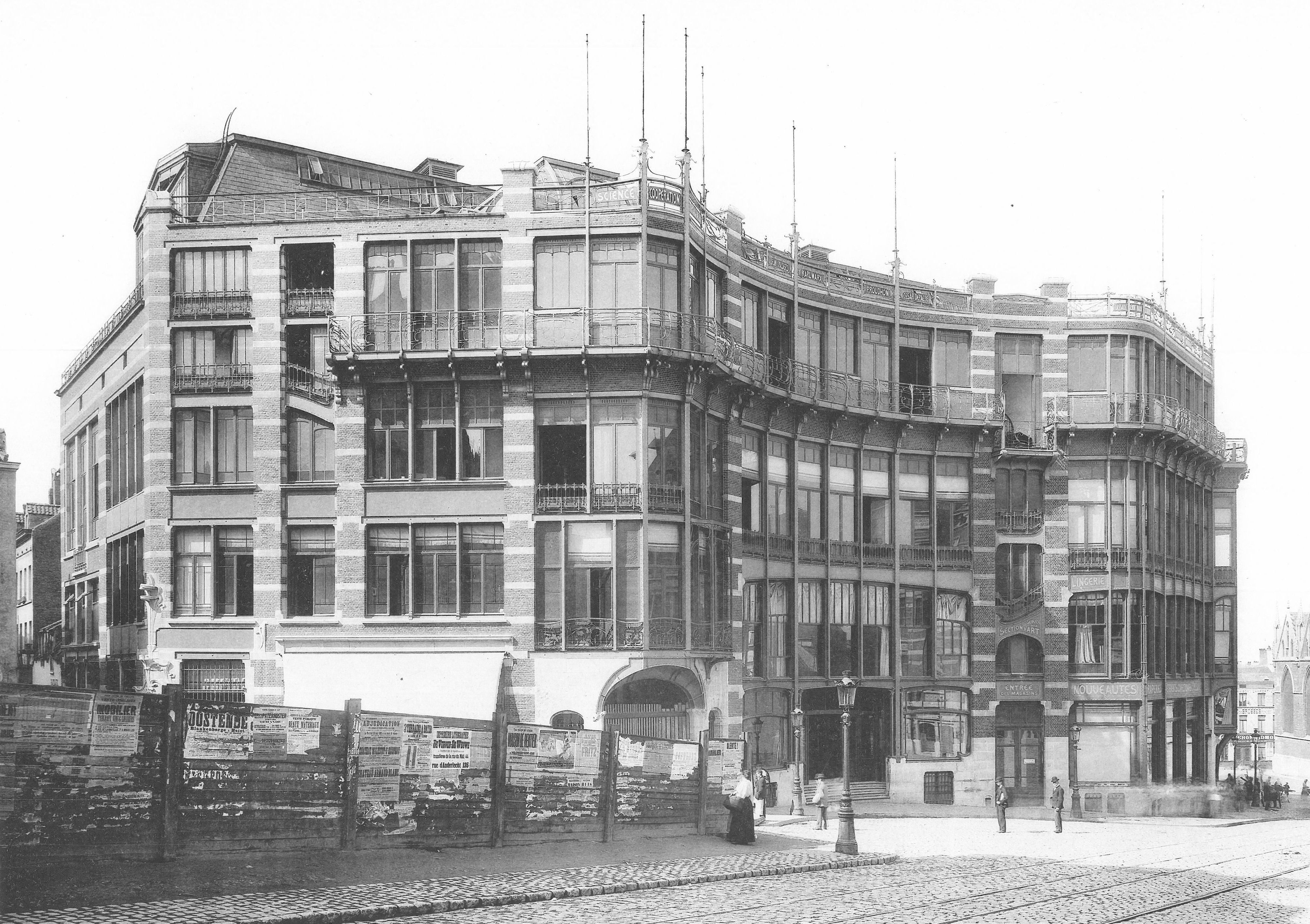
Façade of the Maison du Peuple/Volkshuis by Horta (1896–1899)

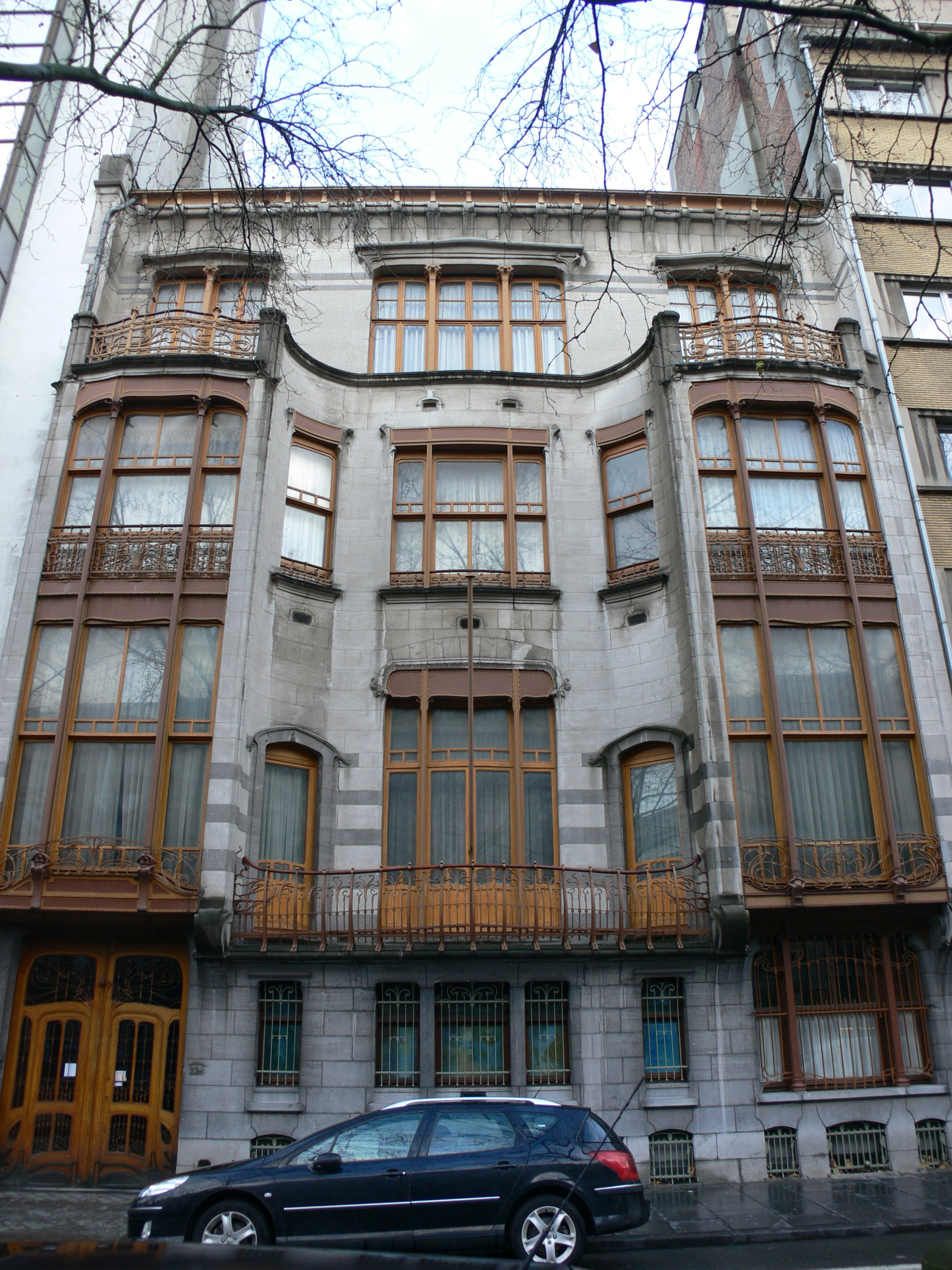
Hôtel Solvay by Horta (1895–1900)

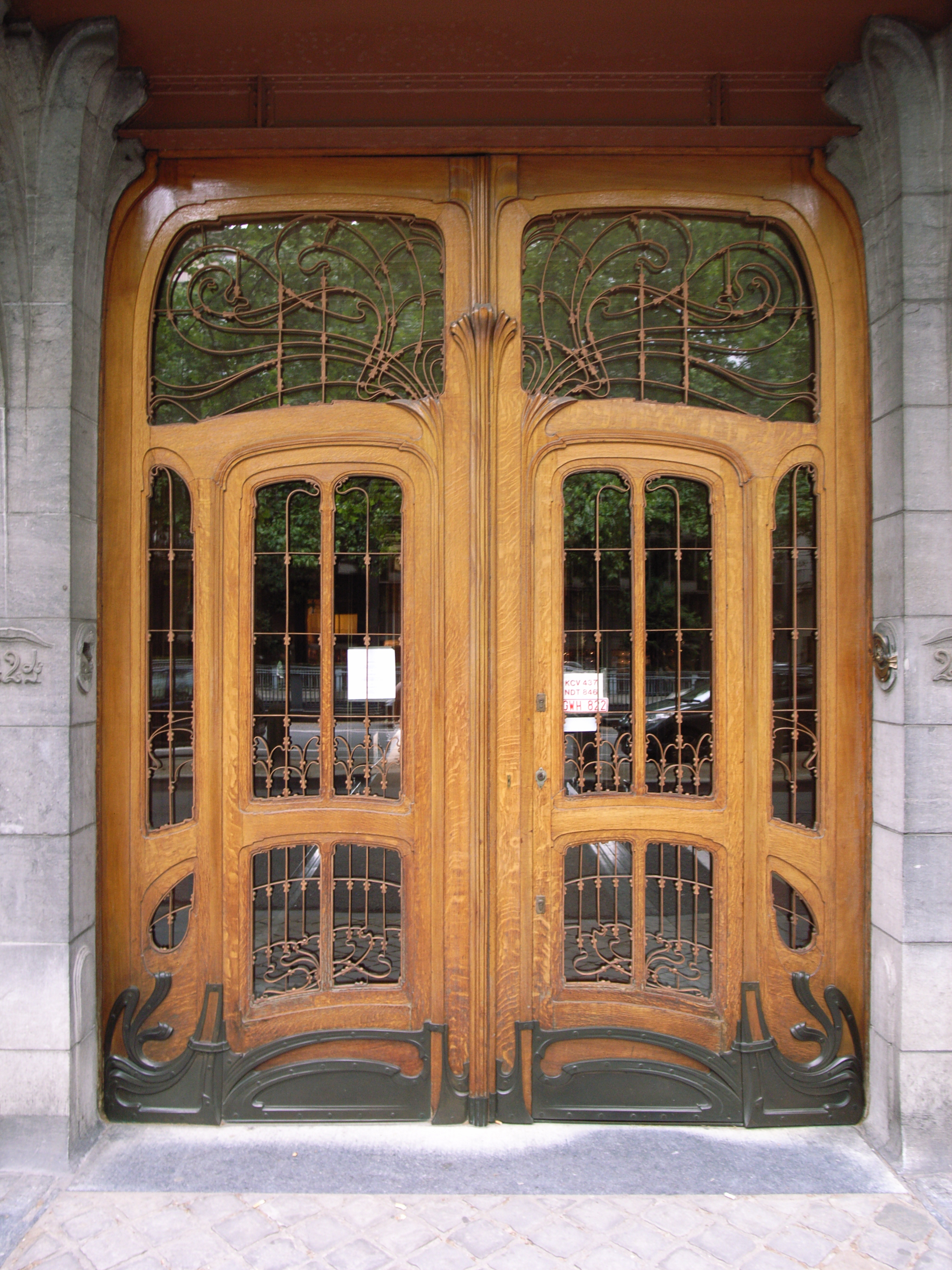
Entrance of the Hôtel Solvay

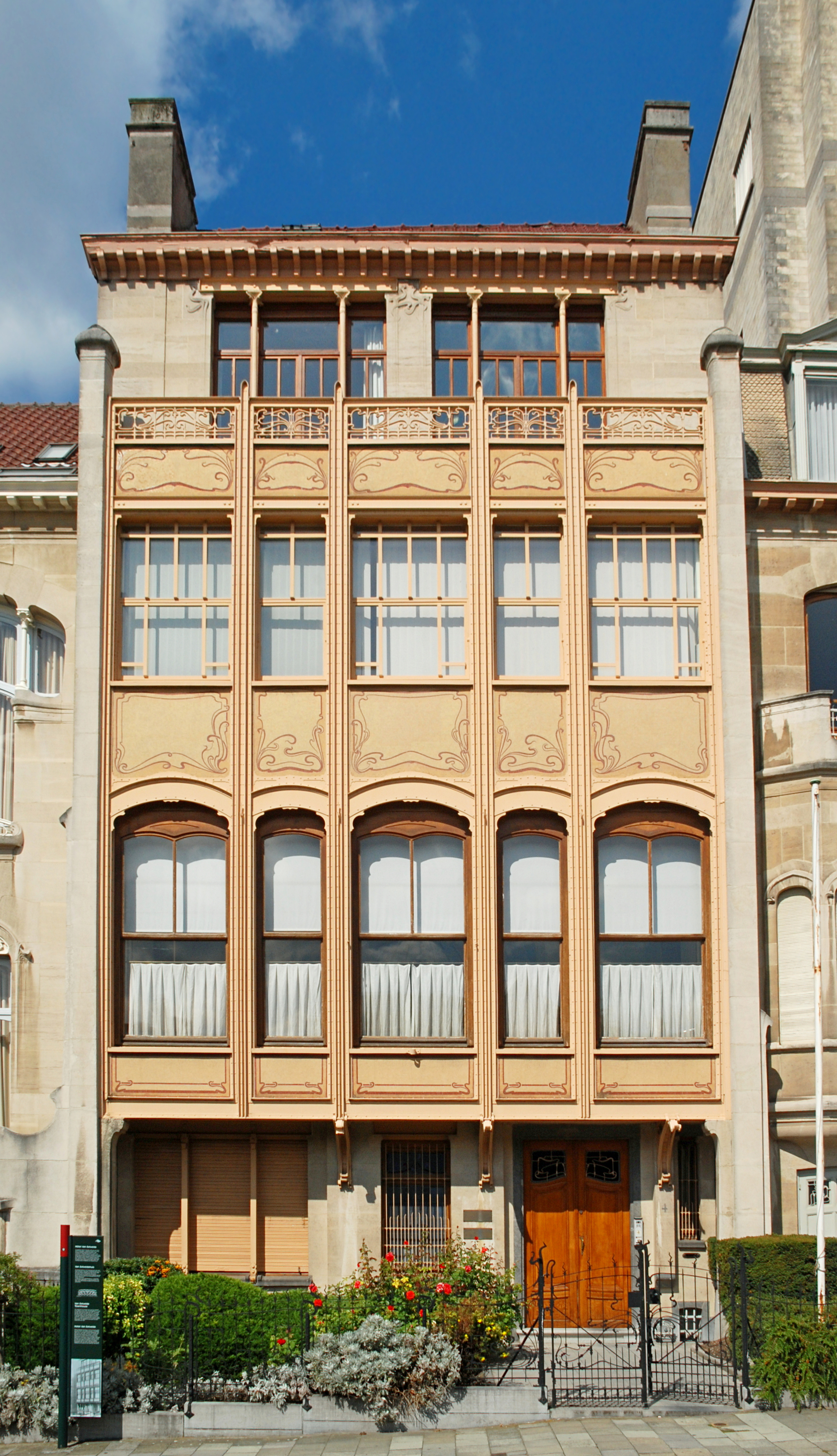
Hôtel van Eetvelde by Horta (1895–1901)

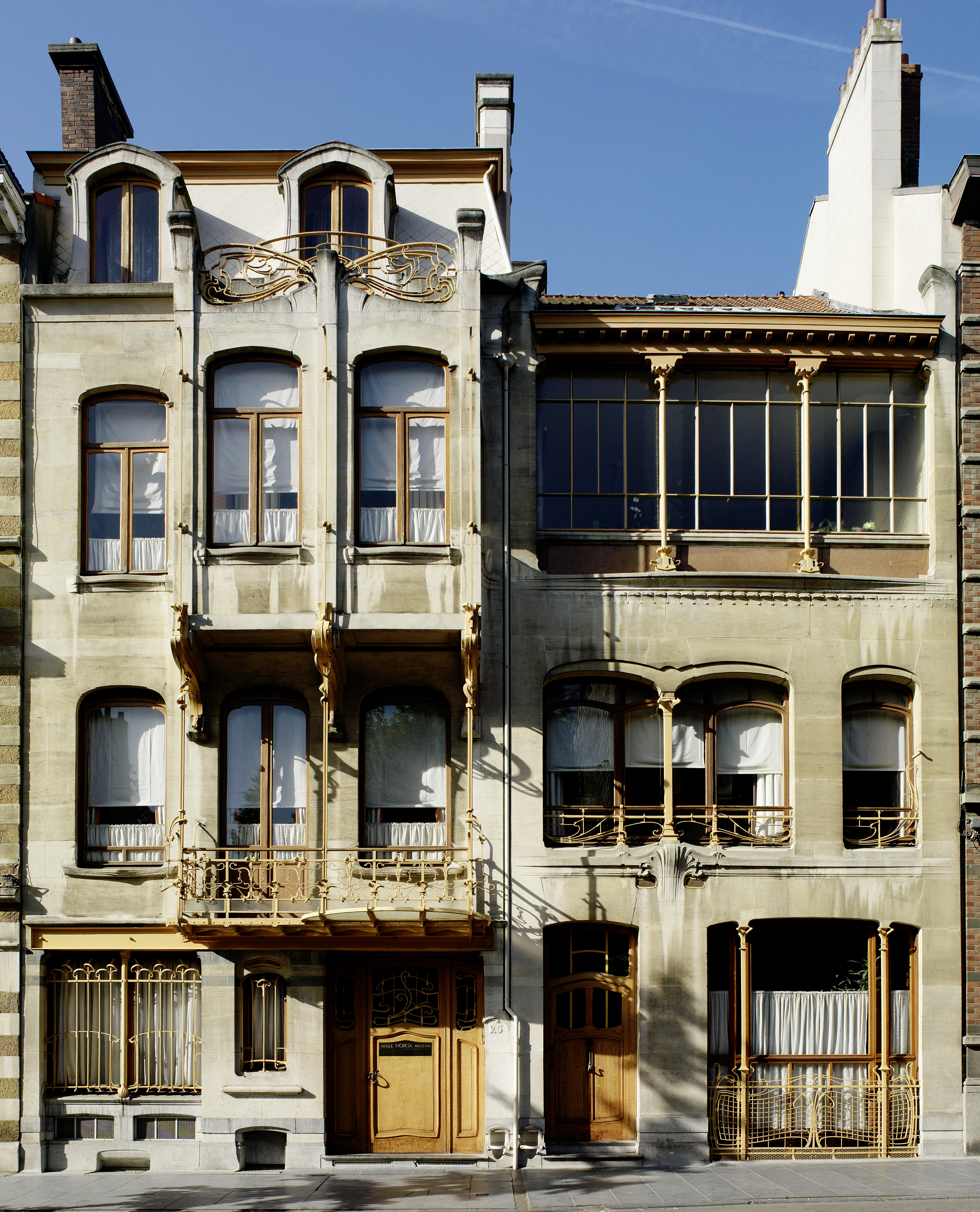
Horta's residence and studio, now the Horta Museum (1898–1901)

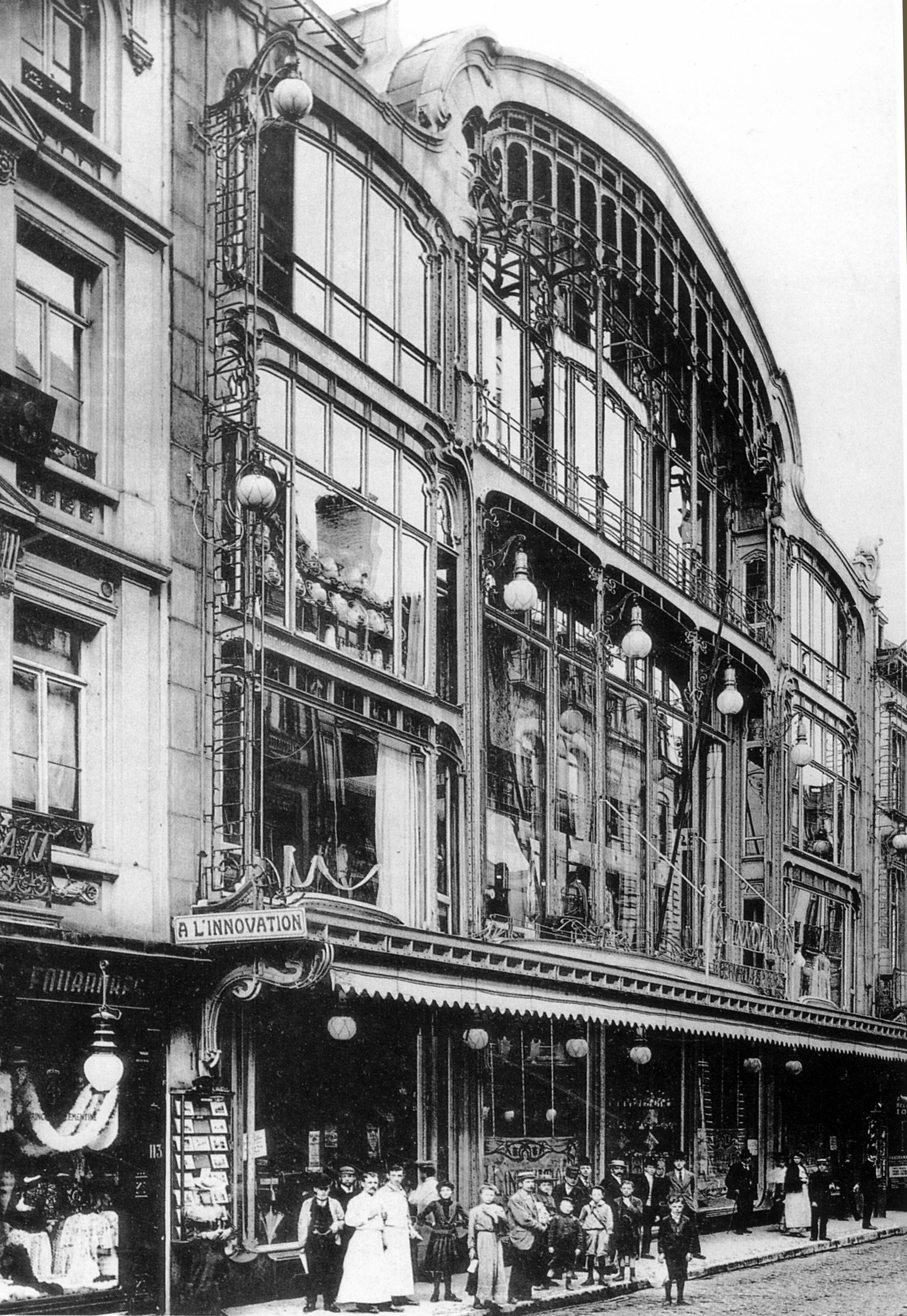
À L'Innovation department store, pictured soon after its opening in 1901

=== Henry Van de Velde ===
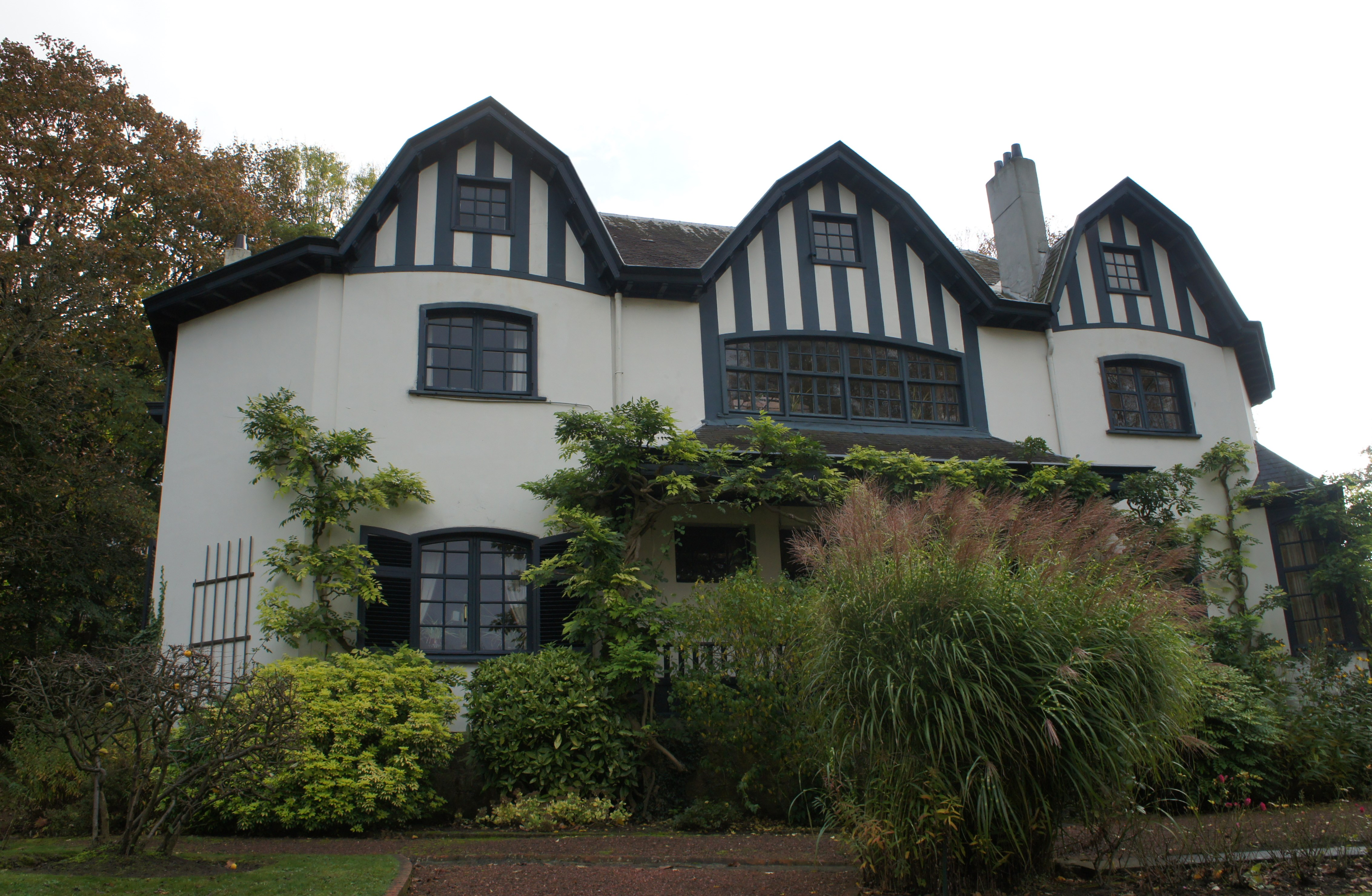
Villa Bloemenwerf, residence of Henry Van de Velde (1895)

Another major figure in Brussels Art Nouveau was Henry Van de Velde (1863–1957). He began as a student of art, music and literature, but in 1893 decided, following the influence of the British textile designer William Morris, to turn to the decorative rather than fine arts. He began designing furniture in 1894, and designed his own house, the Villa Bloemenwerf, in the Uccle municipality of Brussels, based on the Red House of Morris. He rejected the influence either of nature or of historic styles, and designed houses and decoration purely for functionality. In 1906, he left Belgium for Weimar, Germany, where he began a new career with the German Werkebund. After spending the First World War in Switzerland, he returned to Brussels where, from 1925 to 1935, he directed the Higher School of Decorative Arts. In 1947, he settled in Switzerland, where he died in 1957.

=== Josef Hoffmann and the Stoclet Palace (1905–1911) ===
Brussels has the earliest Art Nouveau houses, and also the finest example of a late Art Nouveau or Vienna Secession house, the Stoclet Palace (1905–1911), by the Austrian-Moravian architect Josef Hoffmann, in the Woluwe-Saint-Pierre municipality. The building has virtually nothing in common with the first Art Nouveau houses, except a certain audacity and willingness to break all the previous styles' rules. It was built for the Brussels banker and art collector Adolphe Stoclet, who met Hoffmann in Vienna, and was impressed by his work. The exterior of the Palace is assembled out of large marble cubes, mounting to a tower. The only decoration on the exterior is a small work of sculpture by Franz Metzner over a doorway, and narrow, stylised bands of sculpture accenting the cubes' horizontal and vertical edges.

The interior is much more lavish, with a richness of varied stones and woods, but it is also incessantly geometric. The most famous feature is the mosaic friezes in the dining room by Gustav Klimt. The house was declared a UNESCO World Heritage Site in 2009.

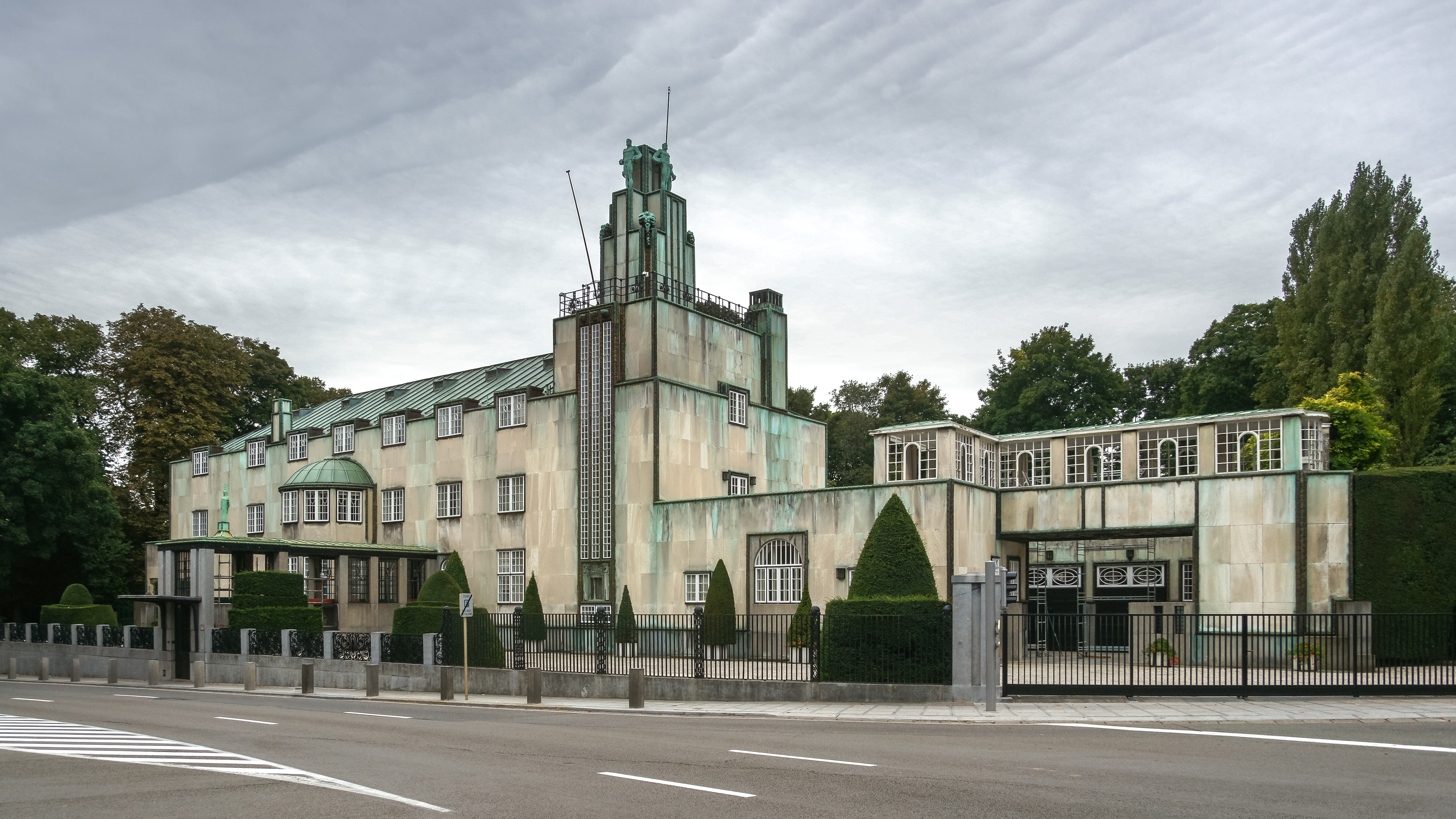
Stoclet Palace by Josef Hoffmann (1905–1911)

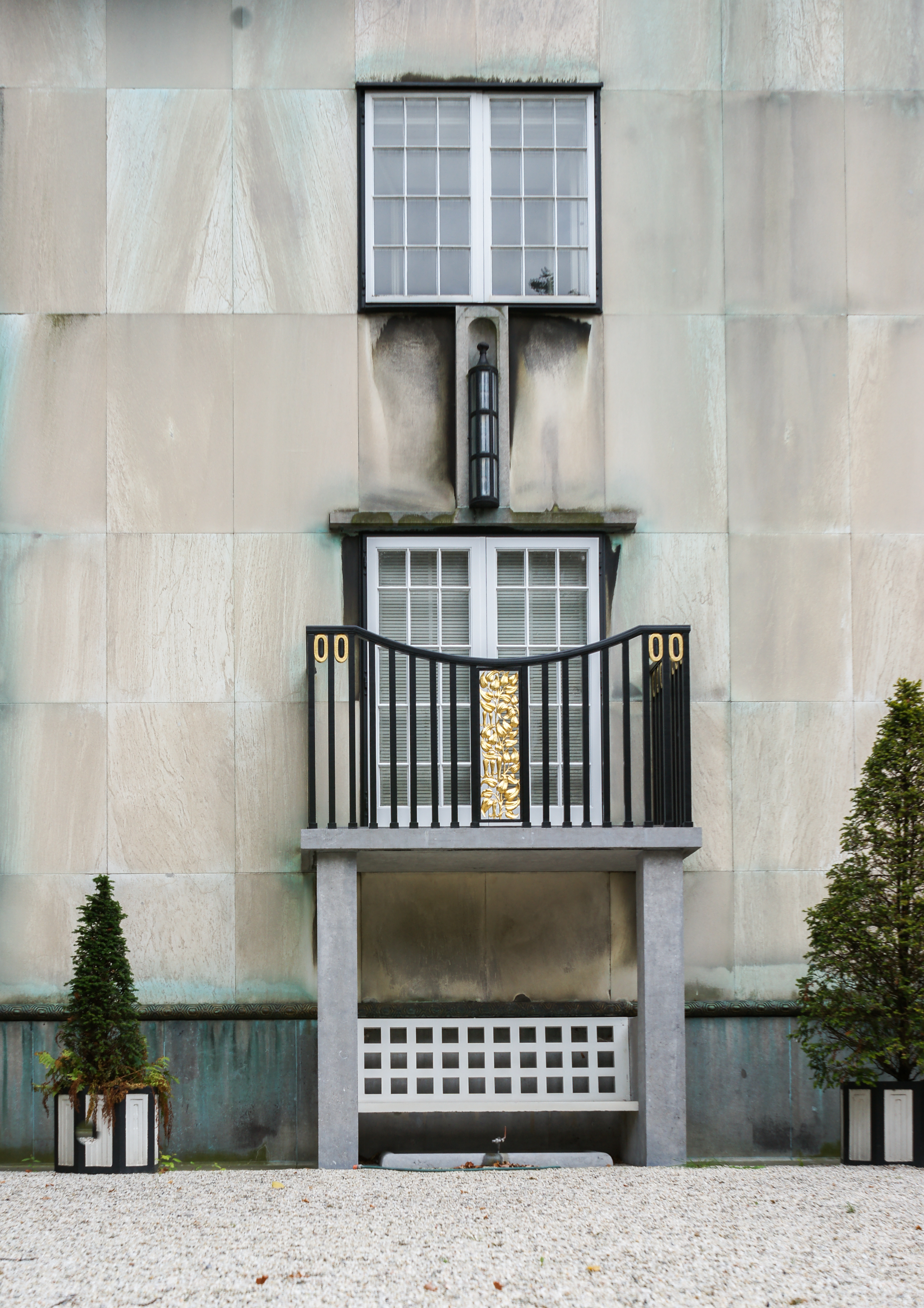
Windows of the Stoclet Palace

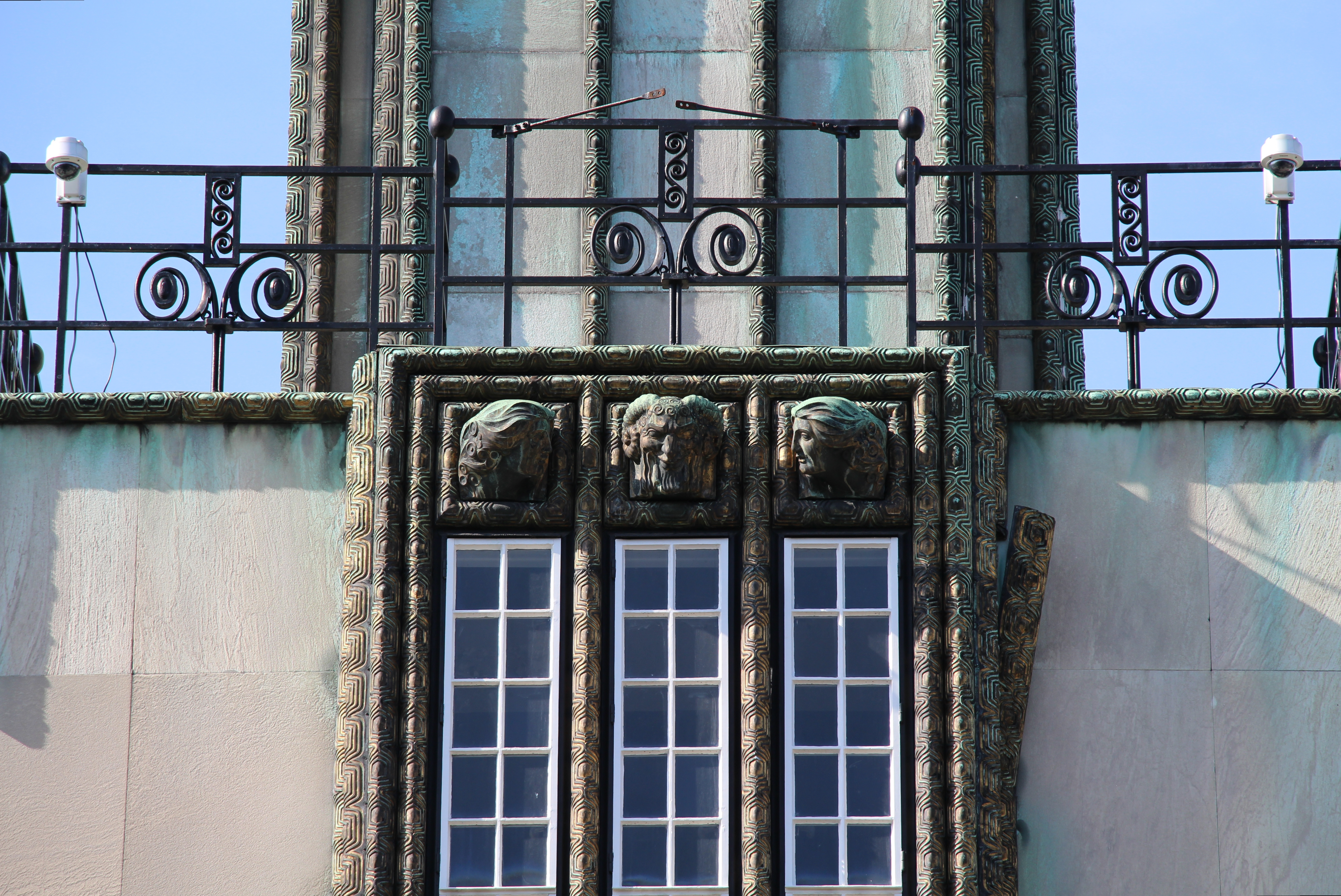
Detail of the façade, made of reinforced concrete covered with marble plaques

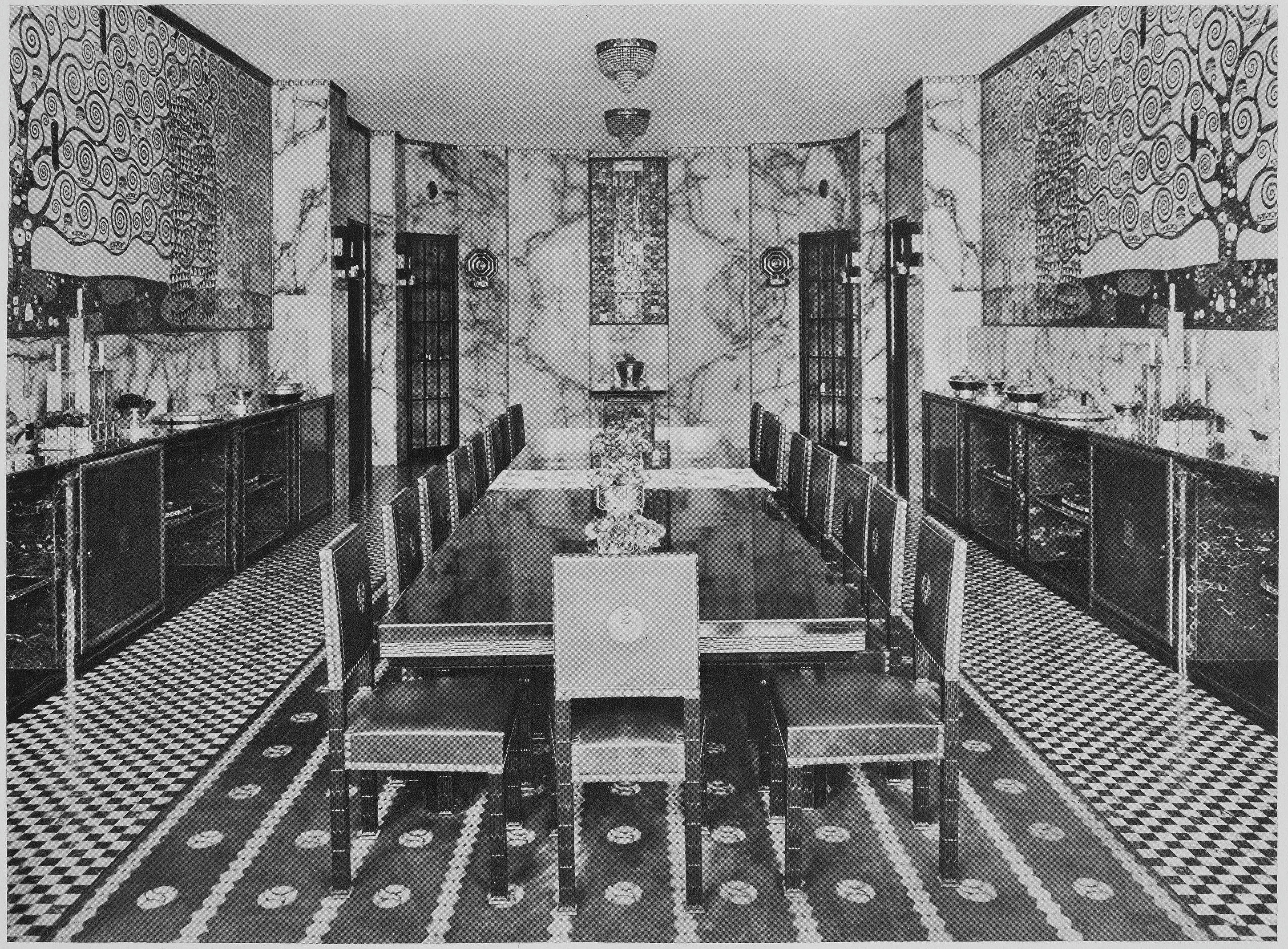
Photograph of the Stoclet Palace's dining room, with furniture by Hoffmann and mosaic frieze by Gustav Klimt

=== Other notable Brussels architects ===
Other notable Art Nouveau architects in Brussels include:

- Paul Saintenoy (1862–1952), who adapted many elements introduced by Horta, including slender iron columns, bow windows, and balustrades with curling lines. His most famous work is the former Old England department store (1898–99), on the Rue Montagne de la Cour/Hofberg, in central Brussels, now the Musical Instruments Museum (MIM). It features natural light, rich decoration of iron grill-work and ceramic tiles, and an open floor plan. In 1899, he also completed the first apartment building in Brussels built of reinforced concrete.
- Léon Sneyers (1877–1958). Sneyers was trained by Hankar, and then became his collaborator, working in particular on the Belgian participation in the 1902 Turin Exposition of Decorative Arts, which brought Belgian design to a wider European audience. He designed many displays for expositions across Europe. He was attracted to the style of the Wiener Werkstätte, and ran a gallery that promoted their products in Brussels.
- Gustave Strauven (1878–1919). Strauven began his career as an assistant designer working with Horta, before he started his own practice at age 21, making some of the most extravagant Art Nouveau buildings in Brussels. His most famous work is the Saint-Cyr House at 11, square Ambiorix/Ambiorixsquare (1901–1903). The house is only 4 metres (13 ft) wide, but is given extraordinary height by his elaborate architectural inventions. It is entirely covered by polychrome bricks and a network of curling vegetal forms in wrought iron, in a virtually Art Nouveau-Baroque style.
- Paul Cauchie (1875–1952). Cauchie was an architect, decorator, painter, furniture designer, and a specialist in sgraffito, the Renaissance technique of decorating a façade with murals made of tinted plaster applied to a wet surface. He founded his own enterprise in Brussels in 1896 to decorate houses with this technique, which was widely used in the Art Nouveau period. He designed his own house in 1905, at 5, rue des Francs/Frankenstraat, with a façade almost entirely covered with sgraffito. He also decorated the interior with friezes, furniture and woodwork he had designed.
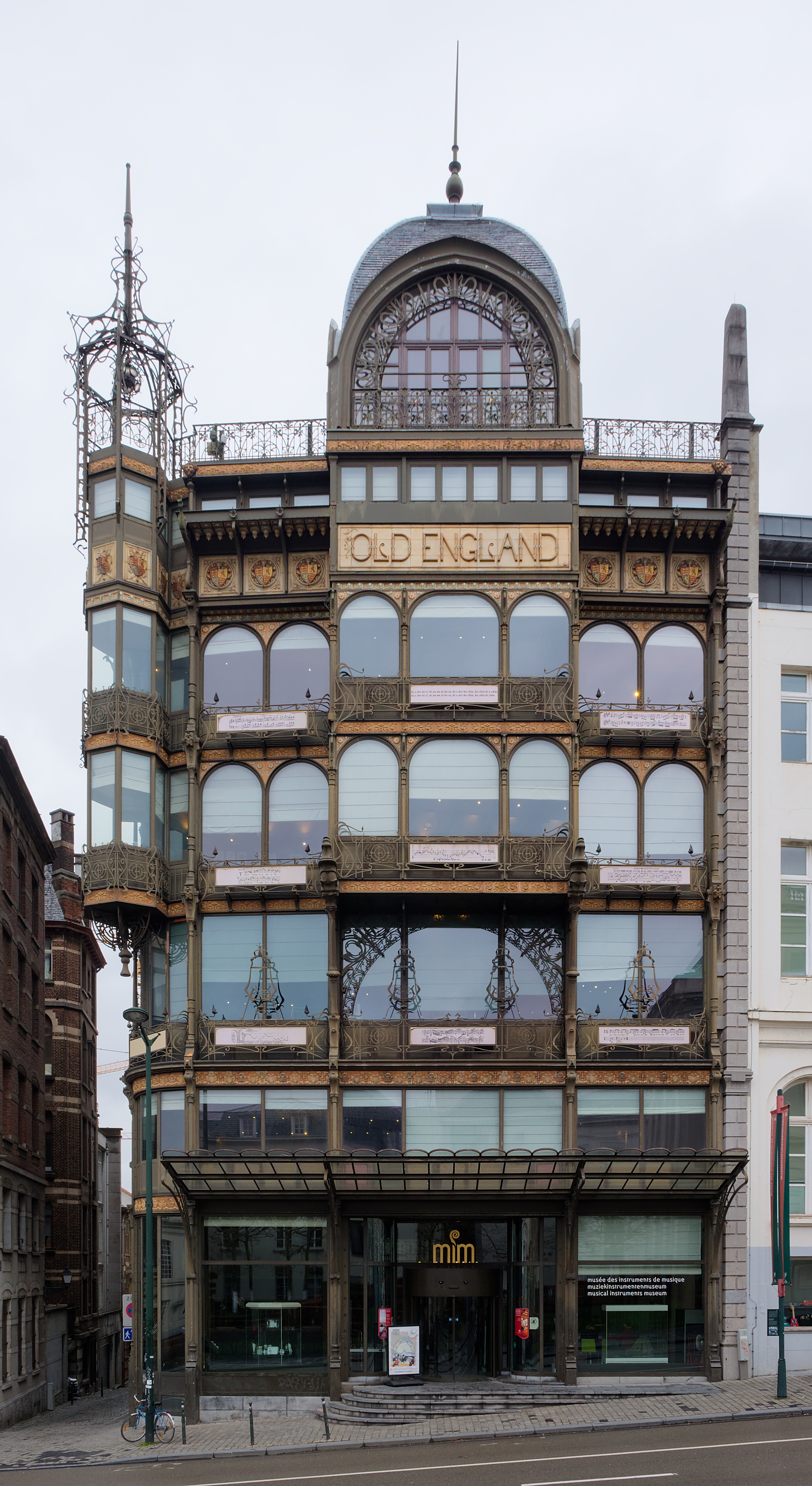
Former Old England department store by Paul Saintenoy (1898–99)

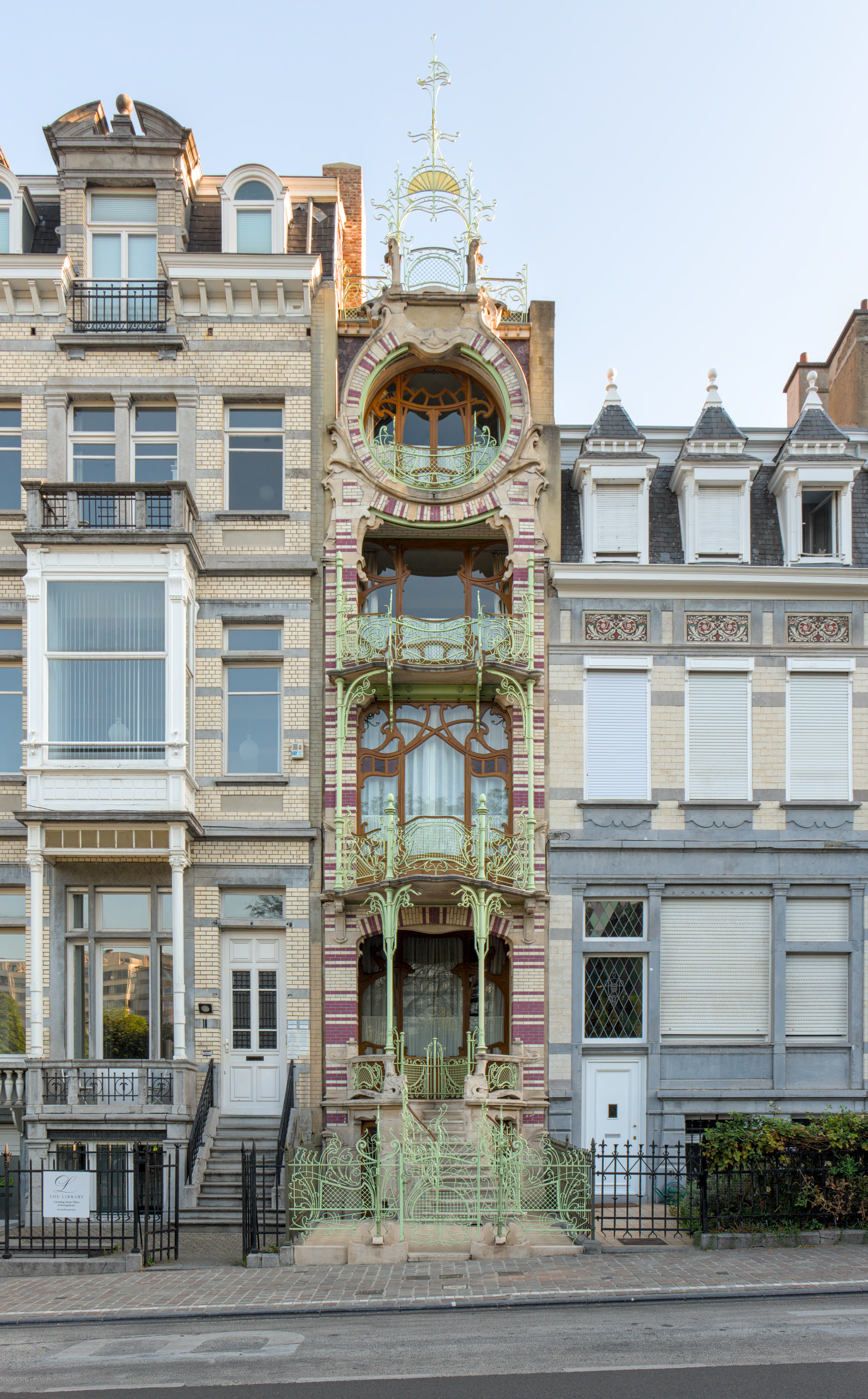
Saint-Cyr House by Gustave Strauven (1901–1903)

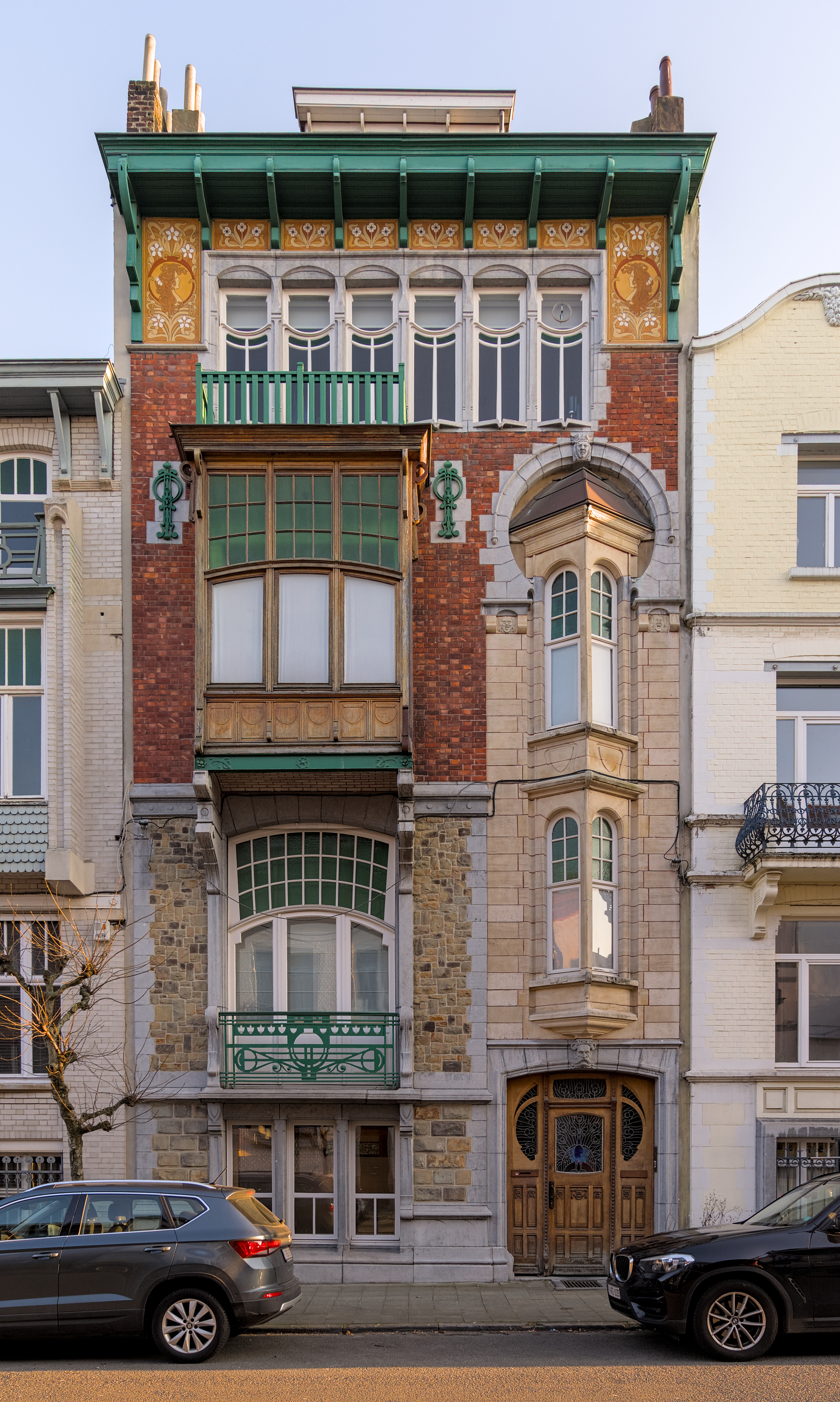
House of the architect Édouard Frankinet (1903)

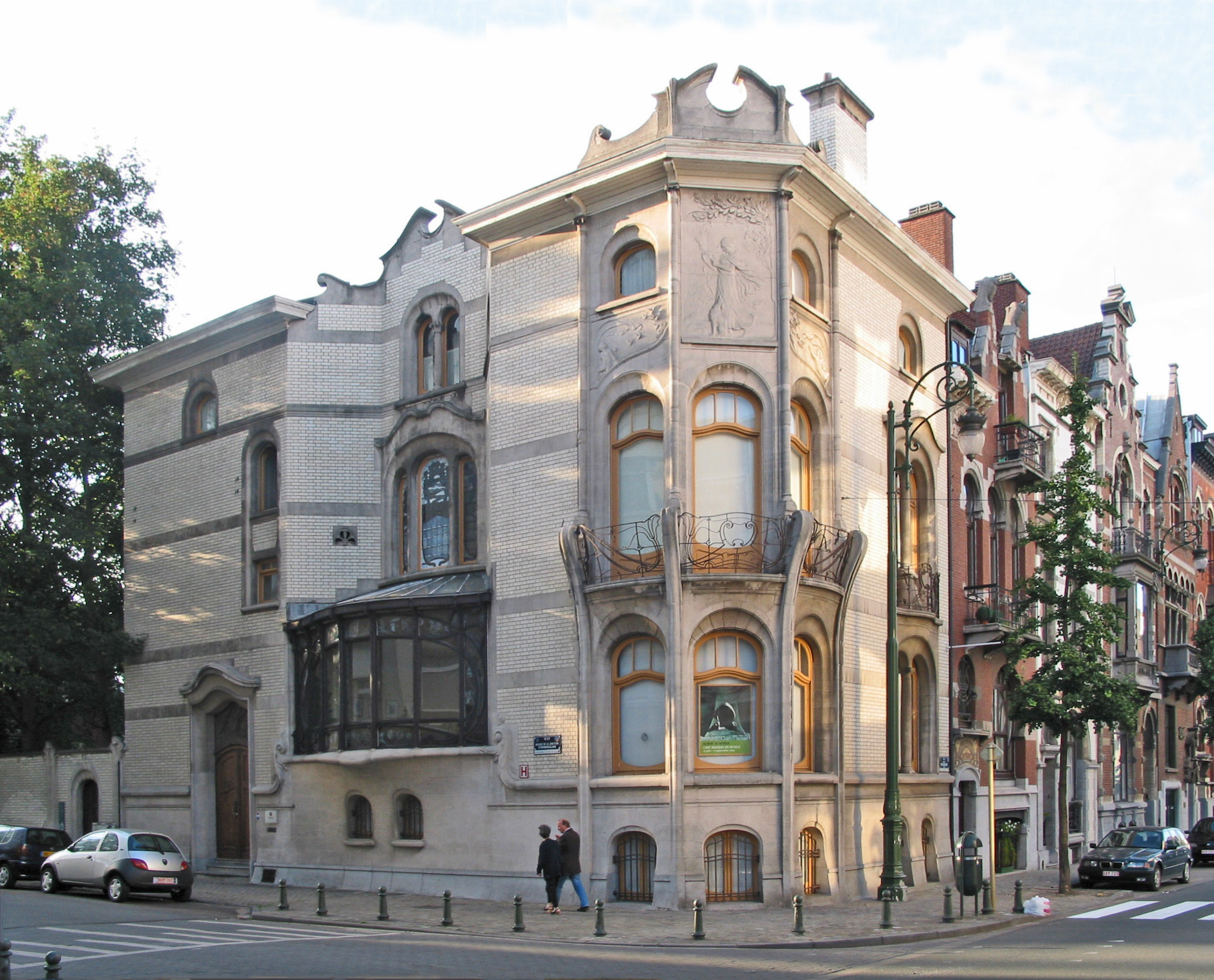
Hôtel Hannon by Jules Brunfaut (1903–04)

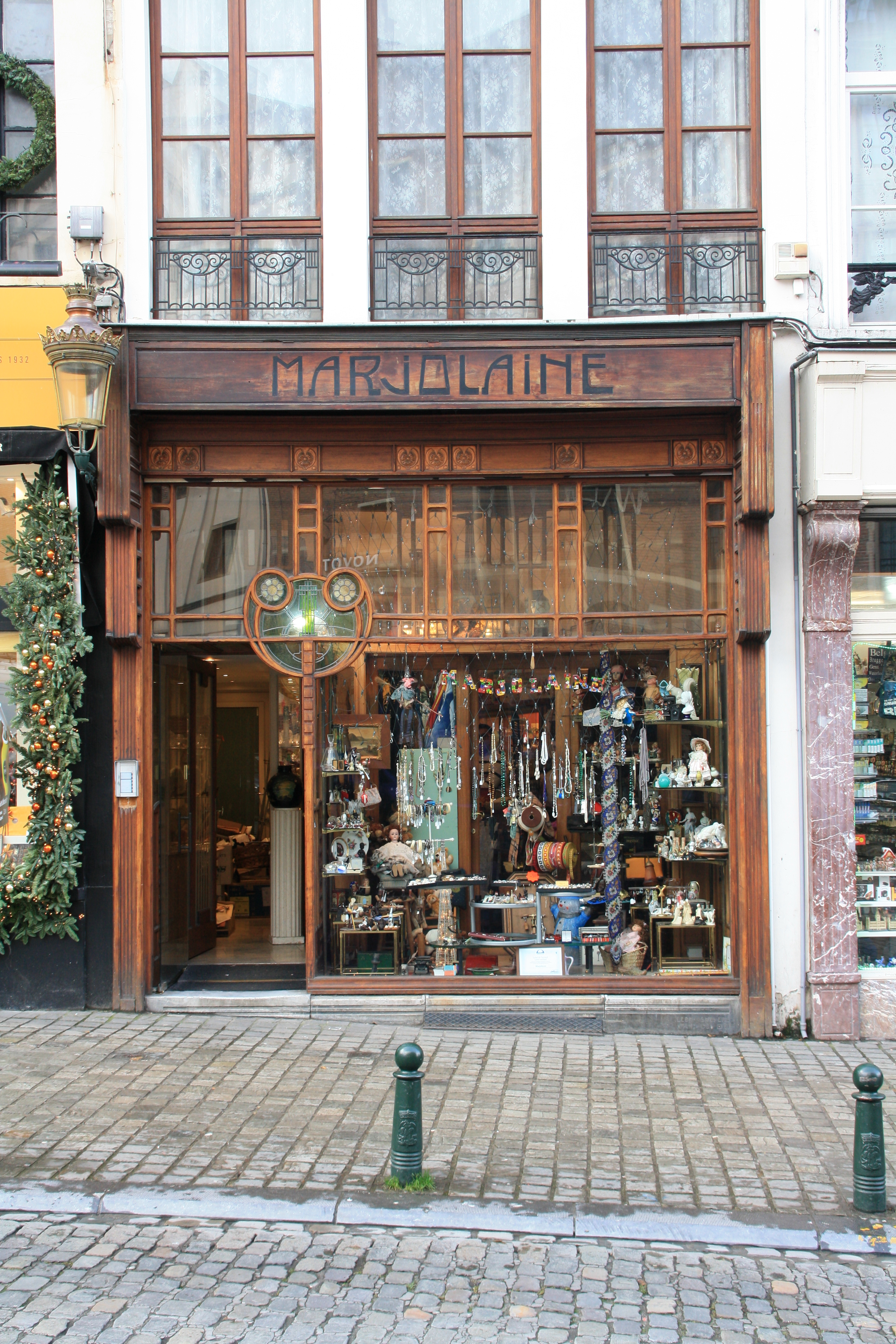
La Marjolaine storefront by Léon Sneyers (1904)

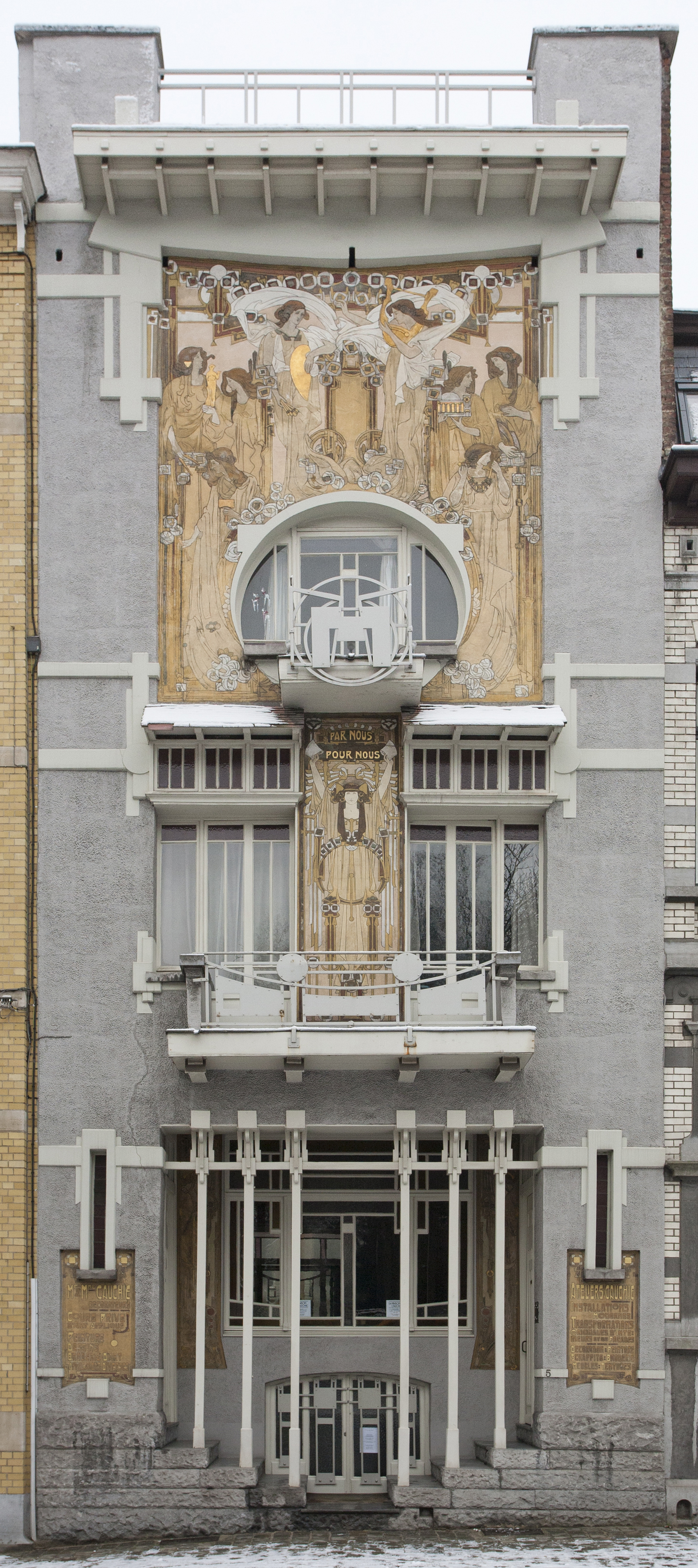
Cauchie House by Paul Cauchie with sgraffito decoration (1905)

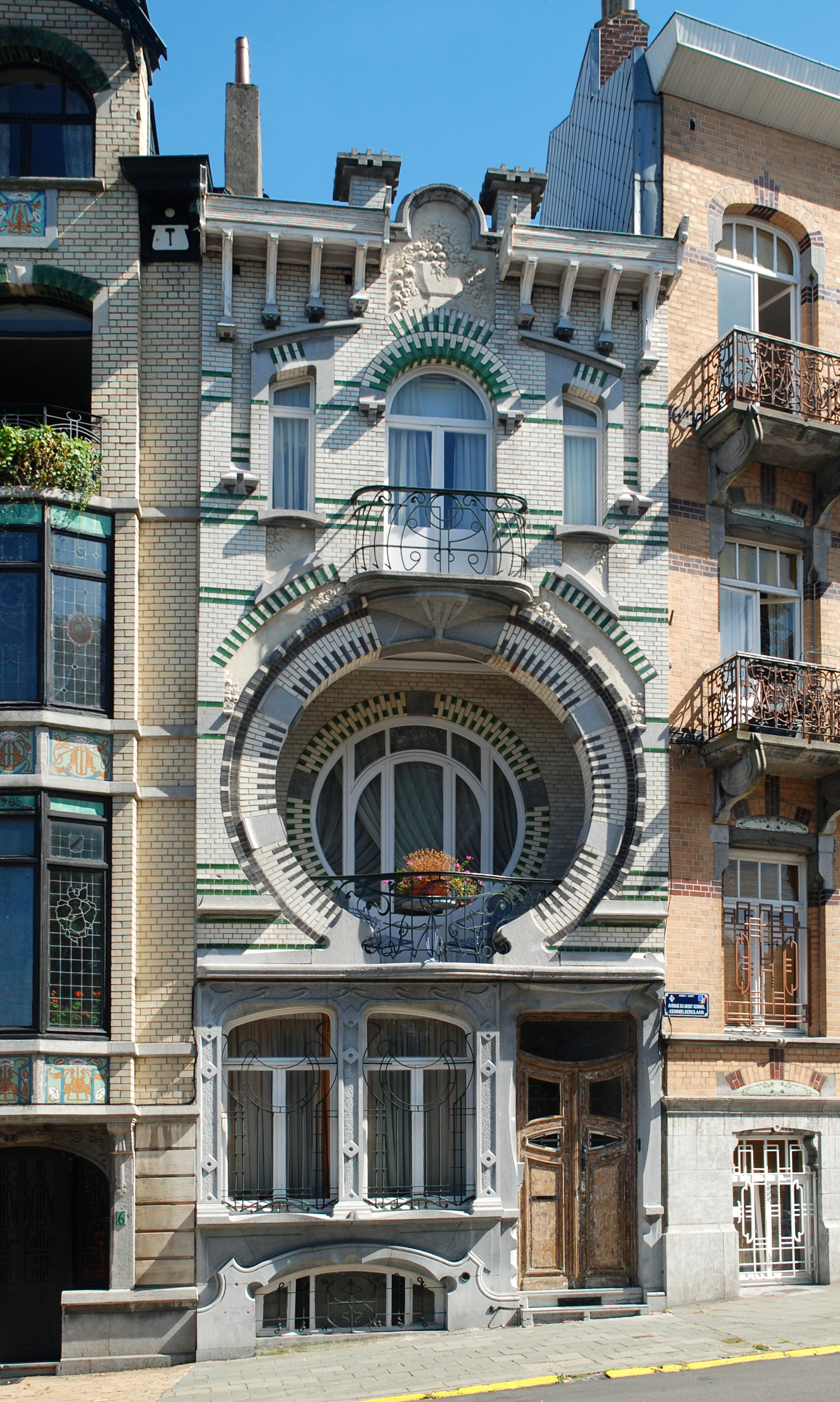
Villa Beau-Site, house of the architect Arthur Nelissen (1905)

== Painting and sgraffito ==
One particular aspect of Brussels' Art Nouveau was the use of sgraffito for exterior or interior decoration. This was a technique invented during the Renaissance, involving applying layers of tinted plaster to a damp wall. It was used in particular by architect Paul Hankar on the façades of houses. The artist-decorator Paul Cauchie made sgraffito for the façade of his own residence, as did the painter Albert Ciamberlani.

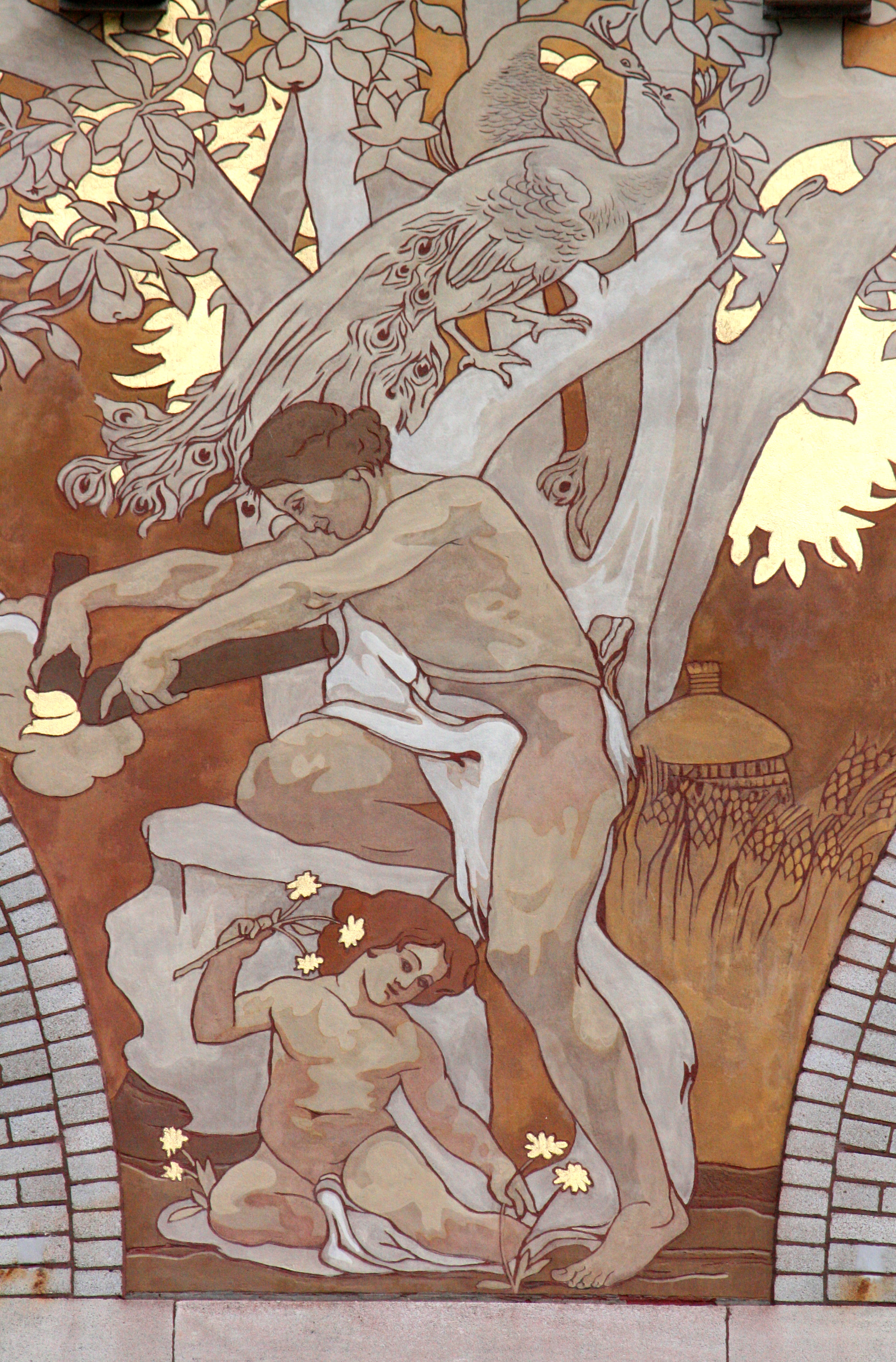
Sgraffito by Albert Ciamberlani for his residence on the Rue Defacqz/Defacqzstraat (1897–98)

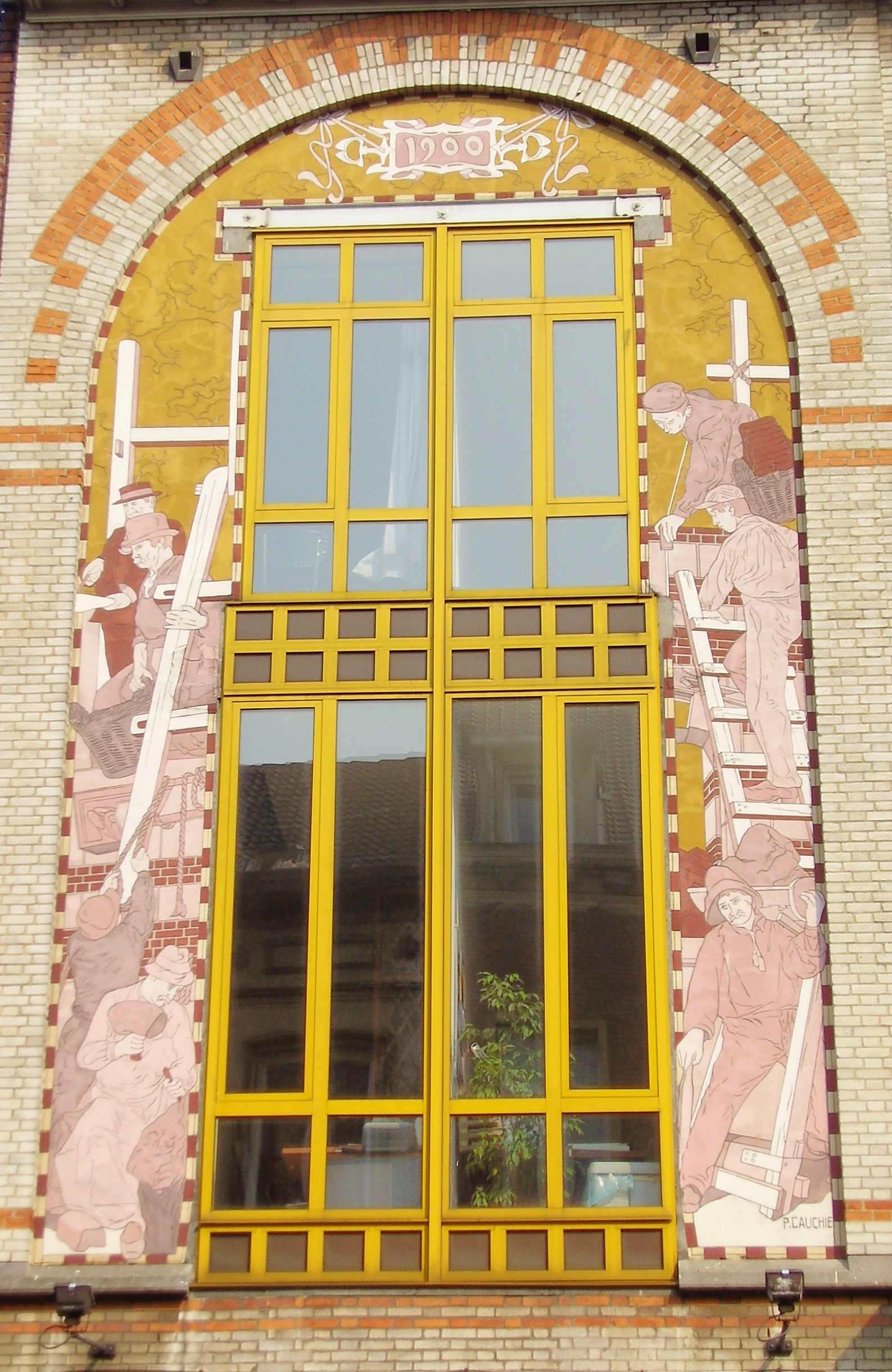
Sgraffito by Cauchie on the Rue Malibran/Malibranstraat (1900)

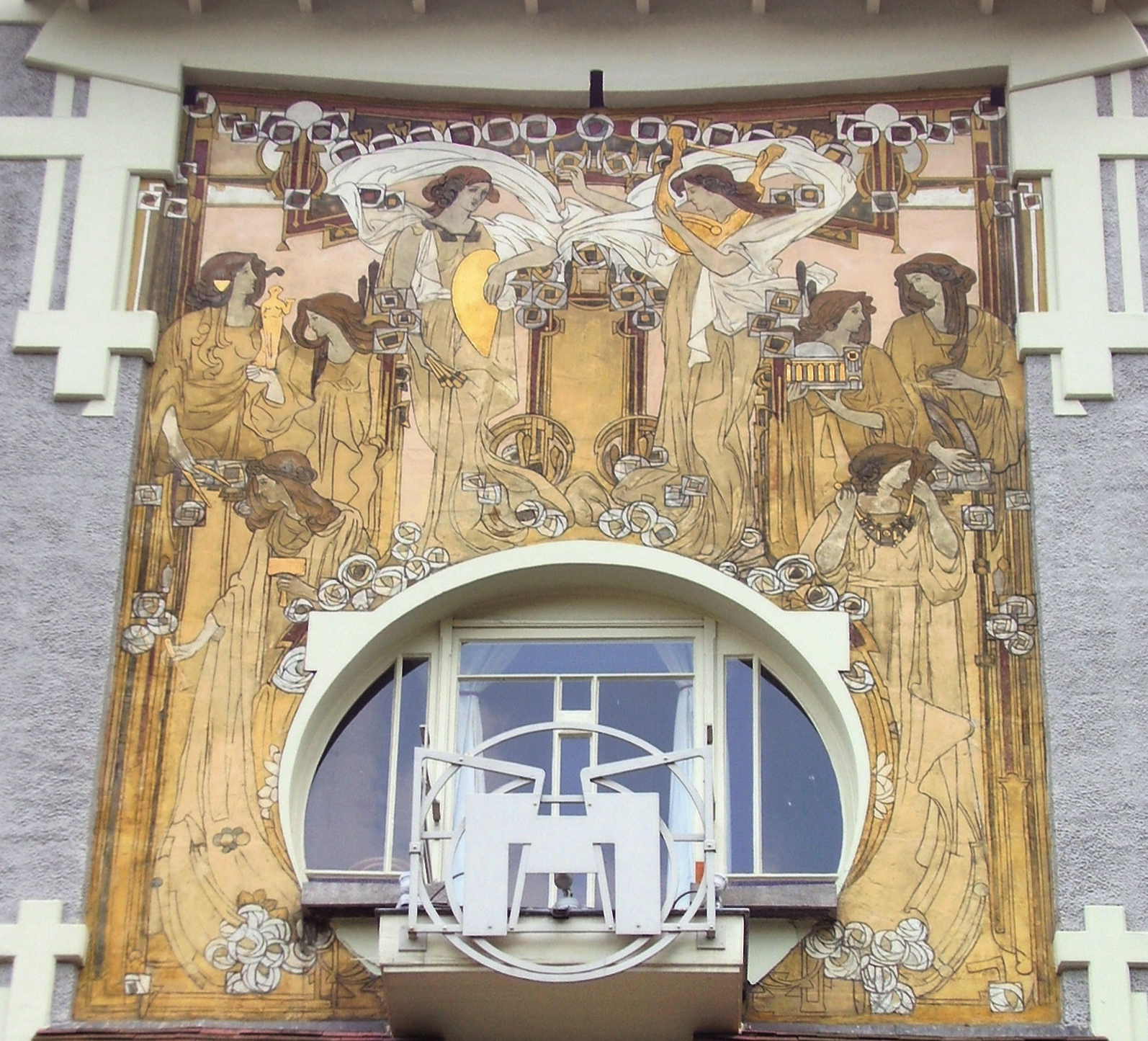
Sgraffito by Cauchie on his residence and studio (1905)

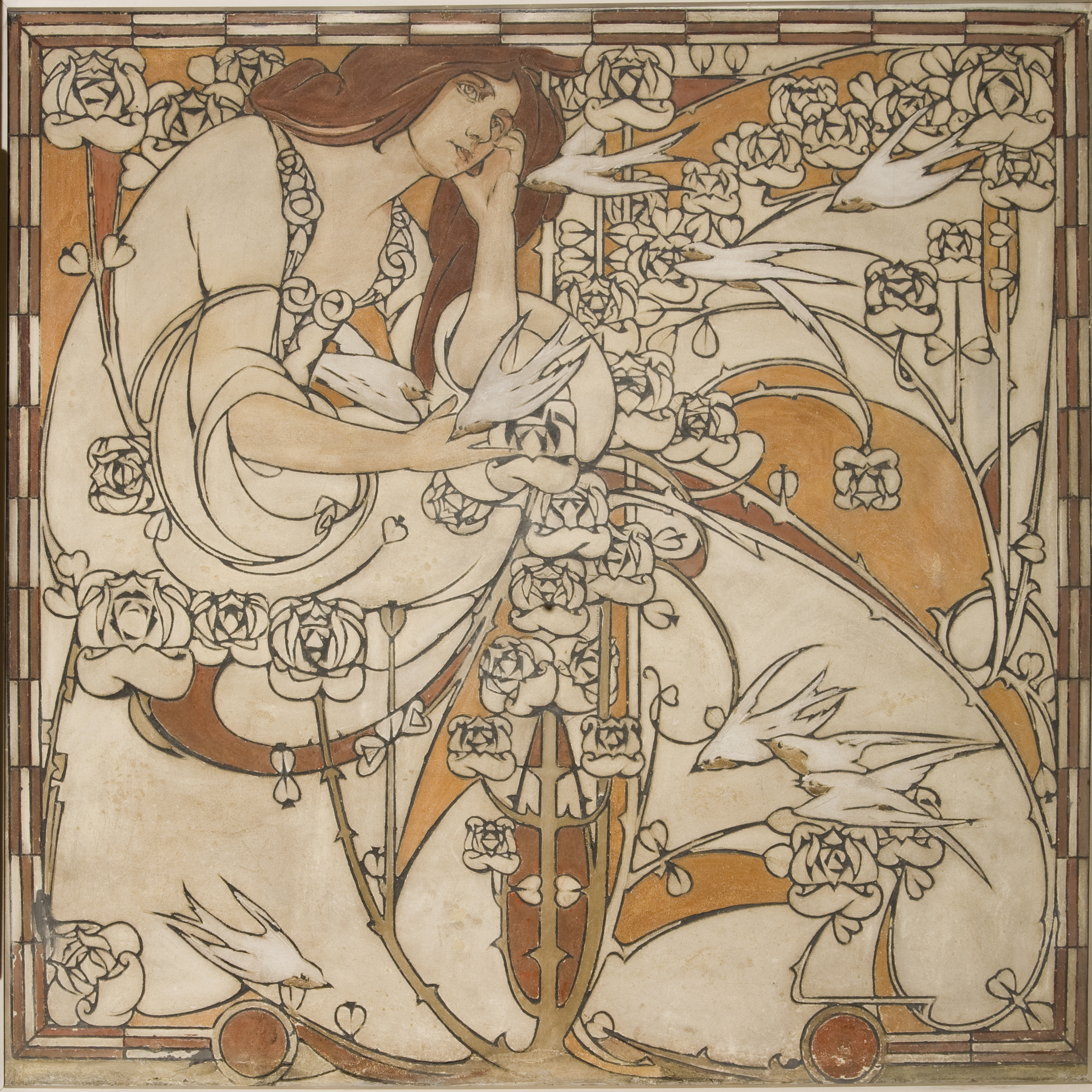
Sgraffito panel in the Cauchie House

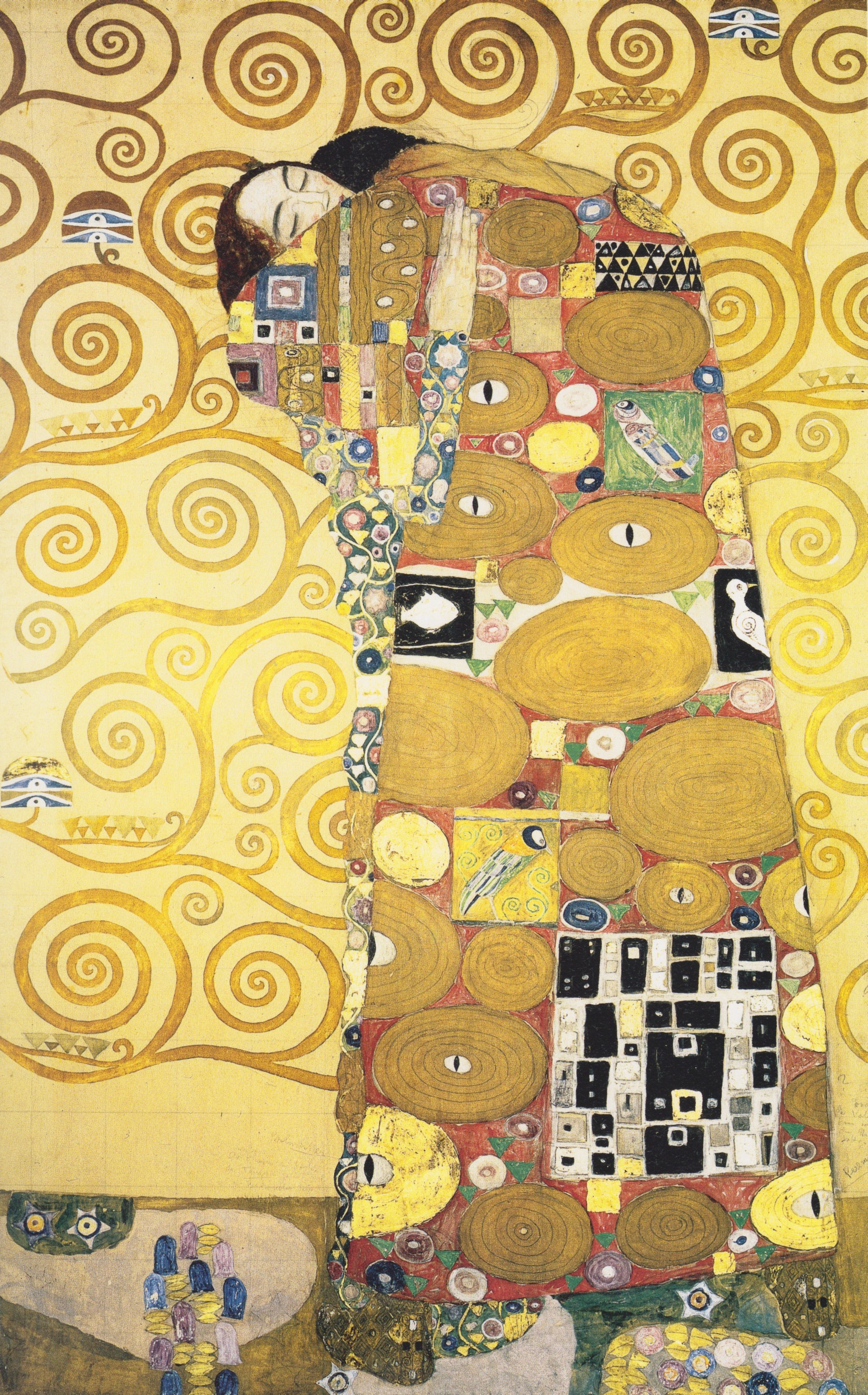
Preparatory painting for dining room of the Stoclet Palace by Gustav Klimt (1905–1911)

== Glass art ==
Glass art was a medium in which Art Nouveau found new and varied ways of expression. Intense amount of experimentation went on to find new effects of transparency and opacity: in engraving with cameo, double layers, and acid engraving, a technique that permitted production in series. Philippe Wolfers (1858–1929), whose store was located in Brussels, was one of the pioneers of the style. He not only created vases in organic and floral forms, but also jewellery, bronzes, lamps, glassware, and other decorative objects, produced mostly for the leading Belgian glass factory of Val Saint Lambert. Wolfers was noted particularly for creating works of symbolist glass, often with metal decoration attached.

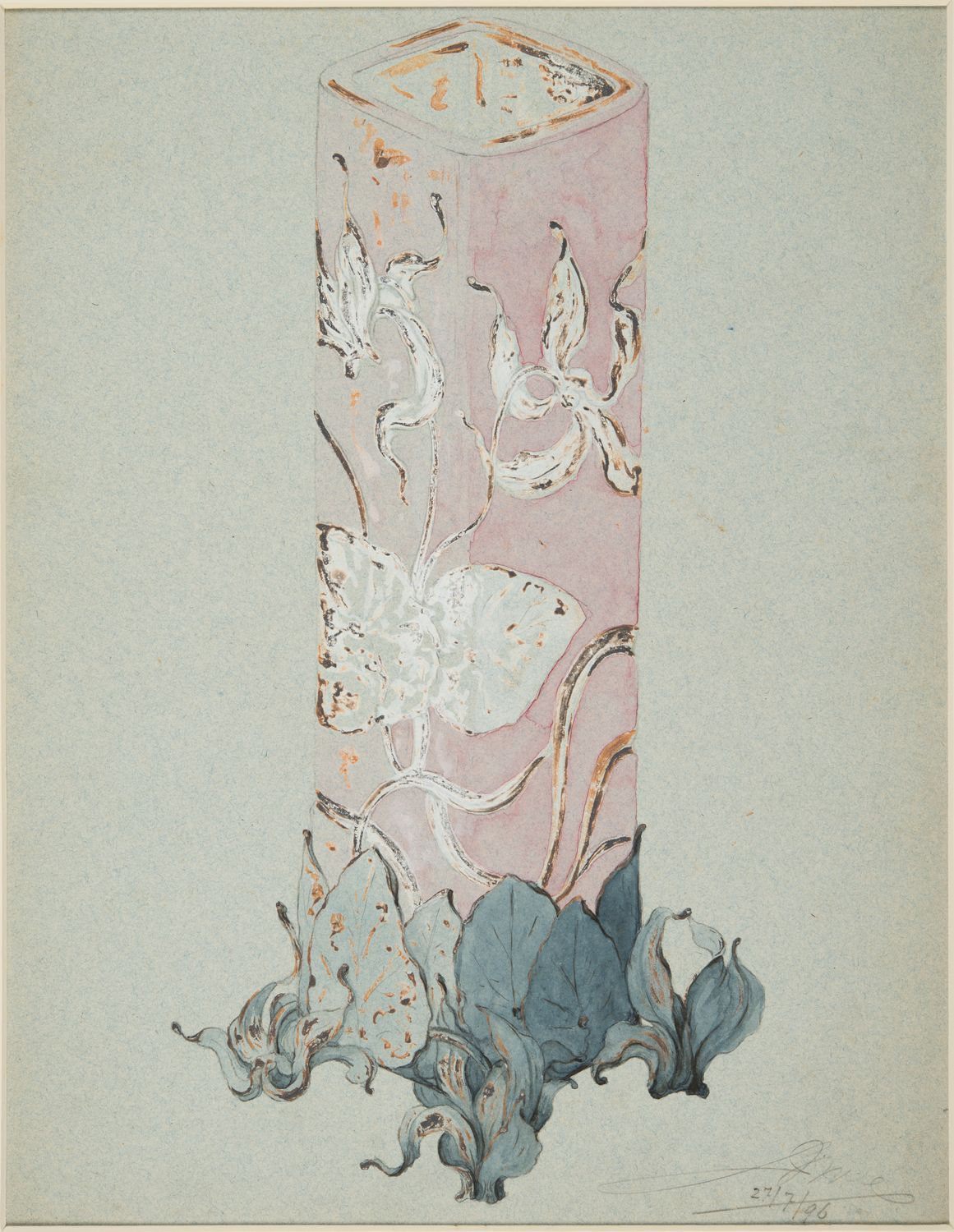
Drawing for Les Chardons ("The Thistles") vase by Philippe Wolfers (1896)

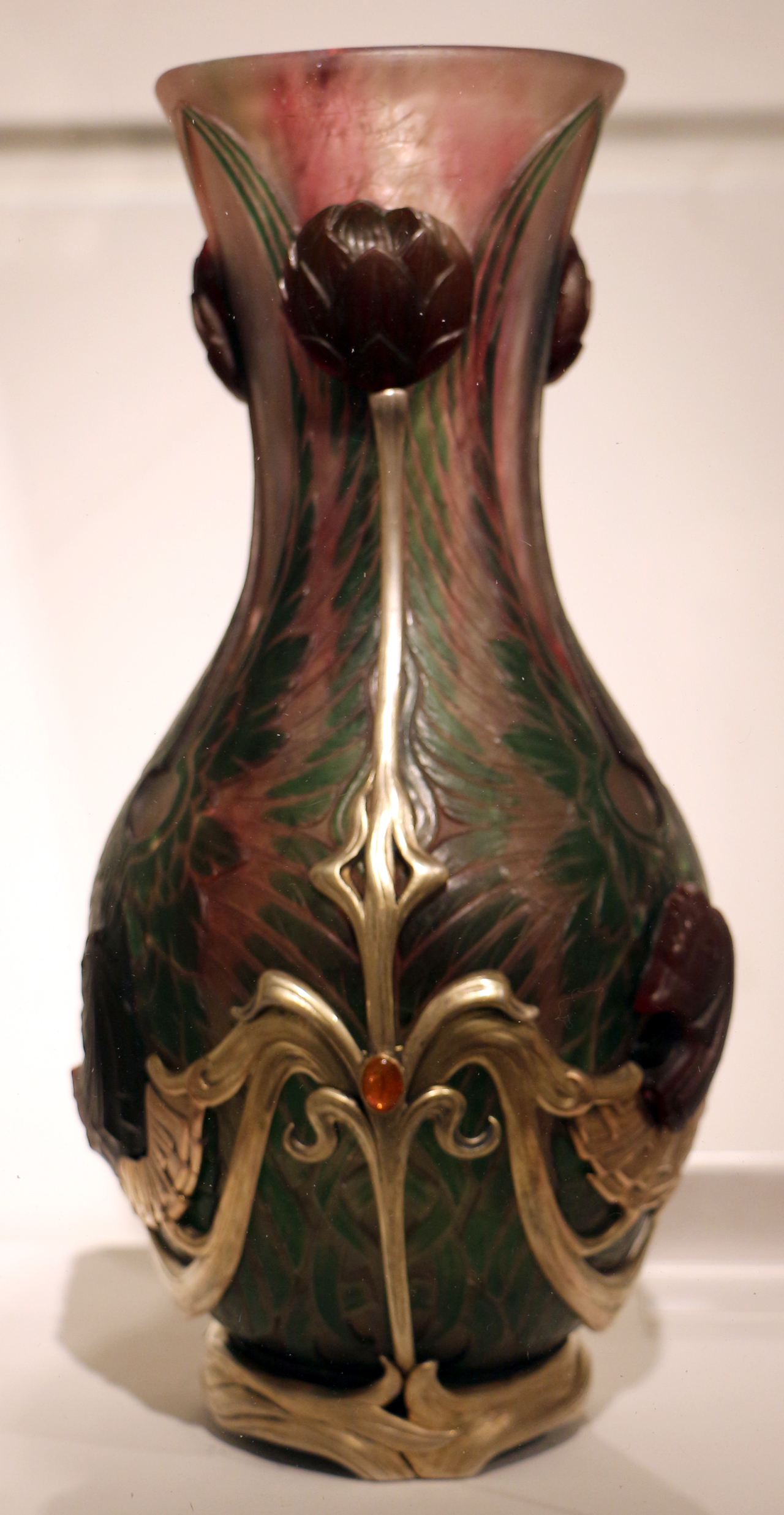
Vase by Wolfers (1899)

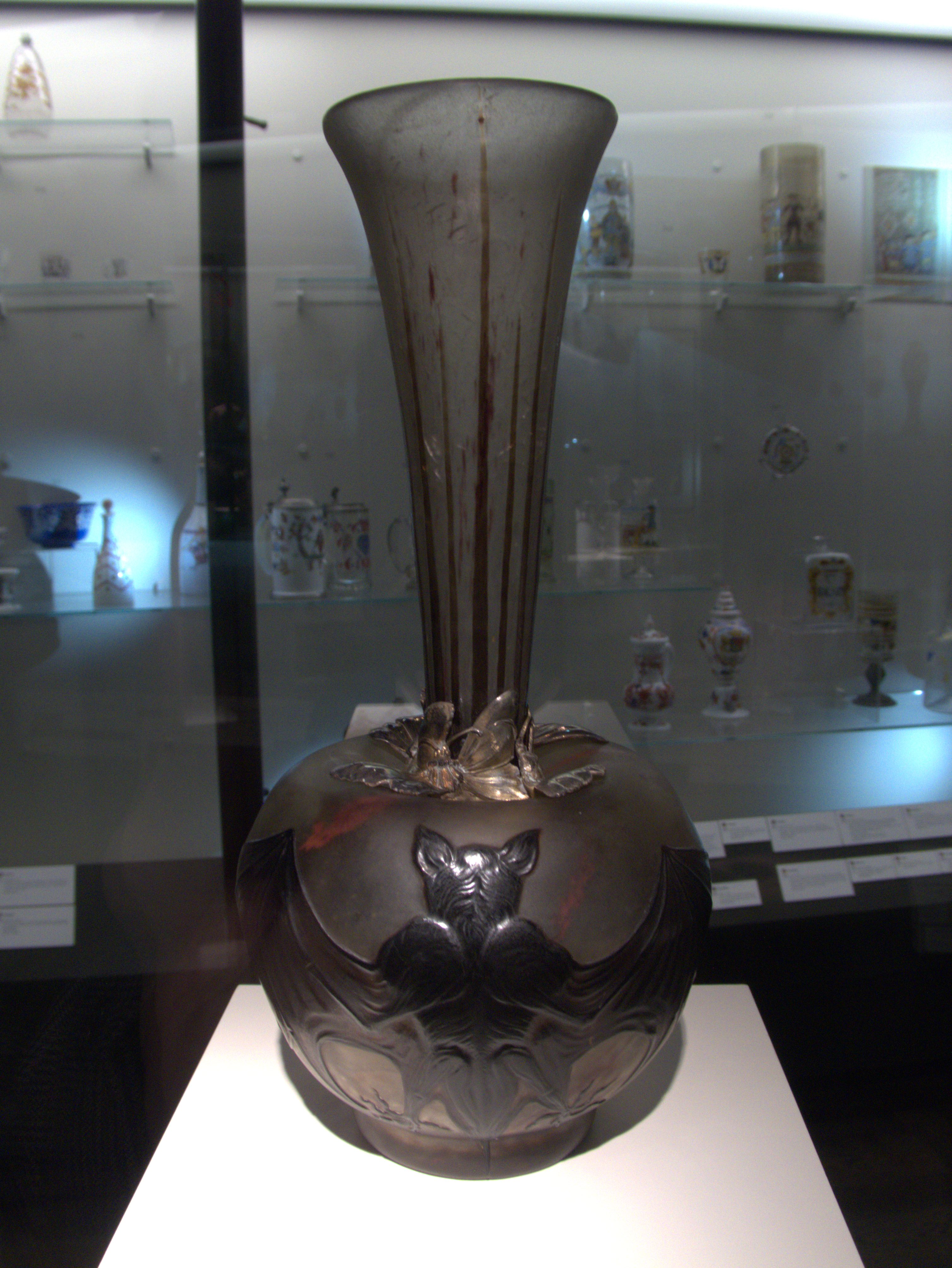
Crépuscule ("Twilight") vase with bat design by Wolfers (1901)

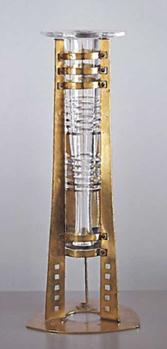
Vase by Gustave Serrurier-Bovy (1904) (Metropolitan Museum of Art, New York City)

Another feature of Brussels' Art Nouveau was the use of stained glass windows with that style of floral themes in residential salons. Victor Horta used stained glass windows, combined with ceramics, wood and iron decoration with similar motifs, to create a harmony between functional elements and decoration, making a unified work of art or Gesamtkunstwerk ("total work of art"). One example is the stained glass window of the doorway of the Hôtel van Eetvelde (1895).

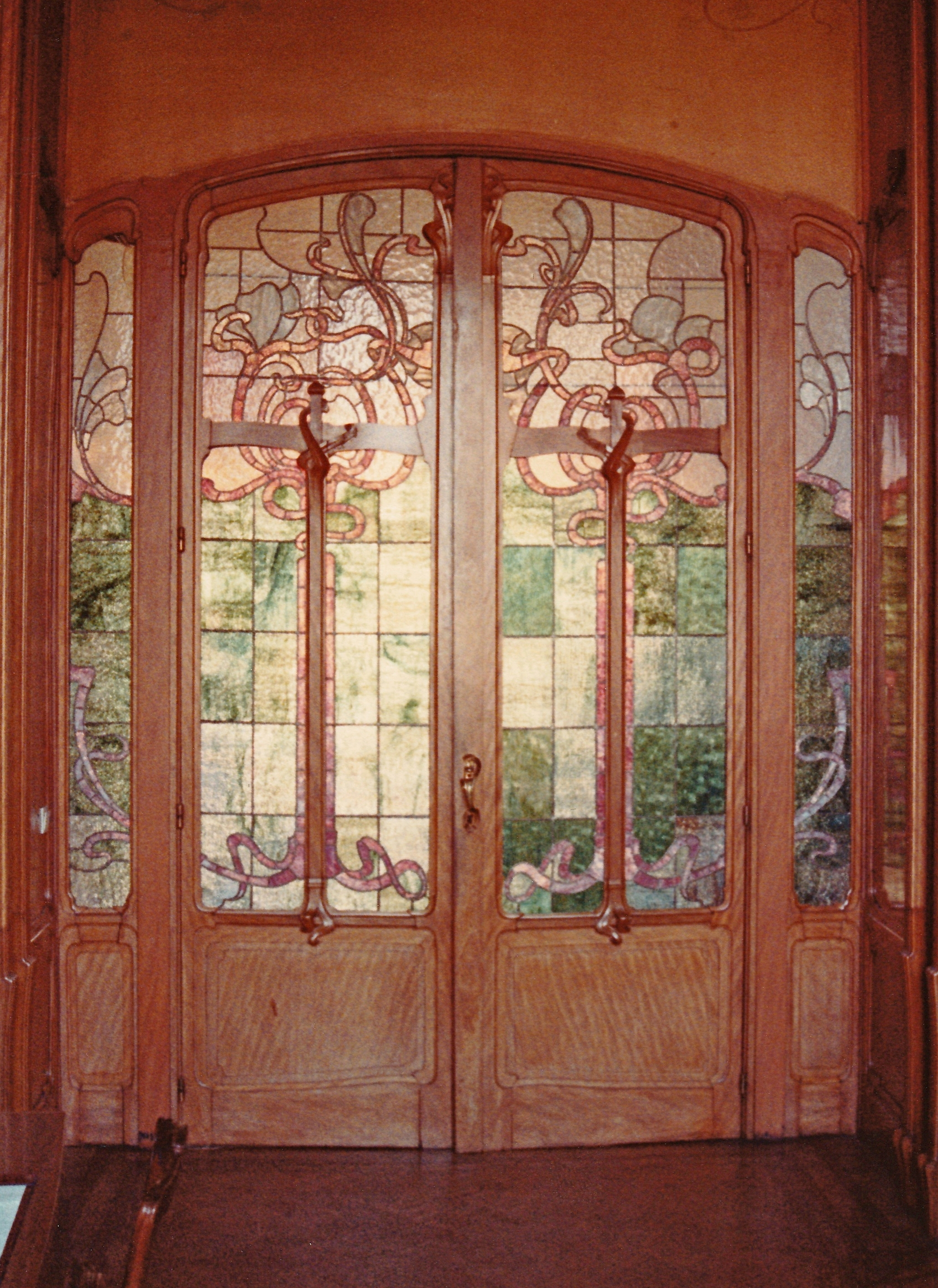
Doorway window of the Hôtel van Eetvelde by Victor Horta (1895)

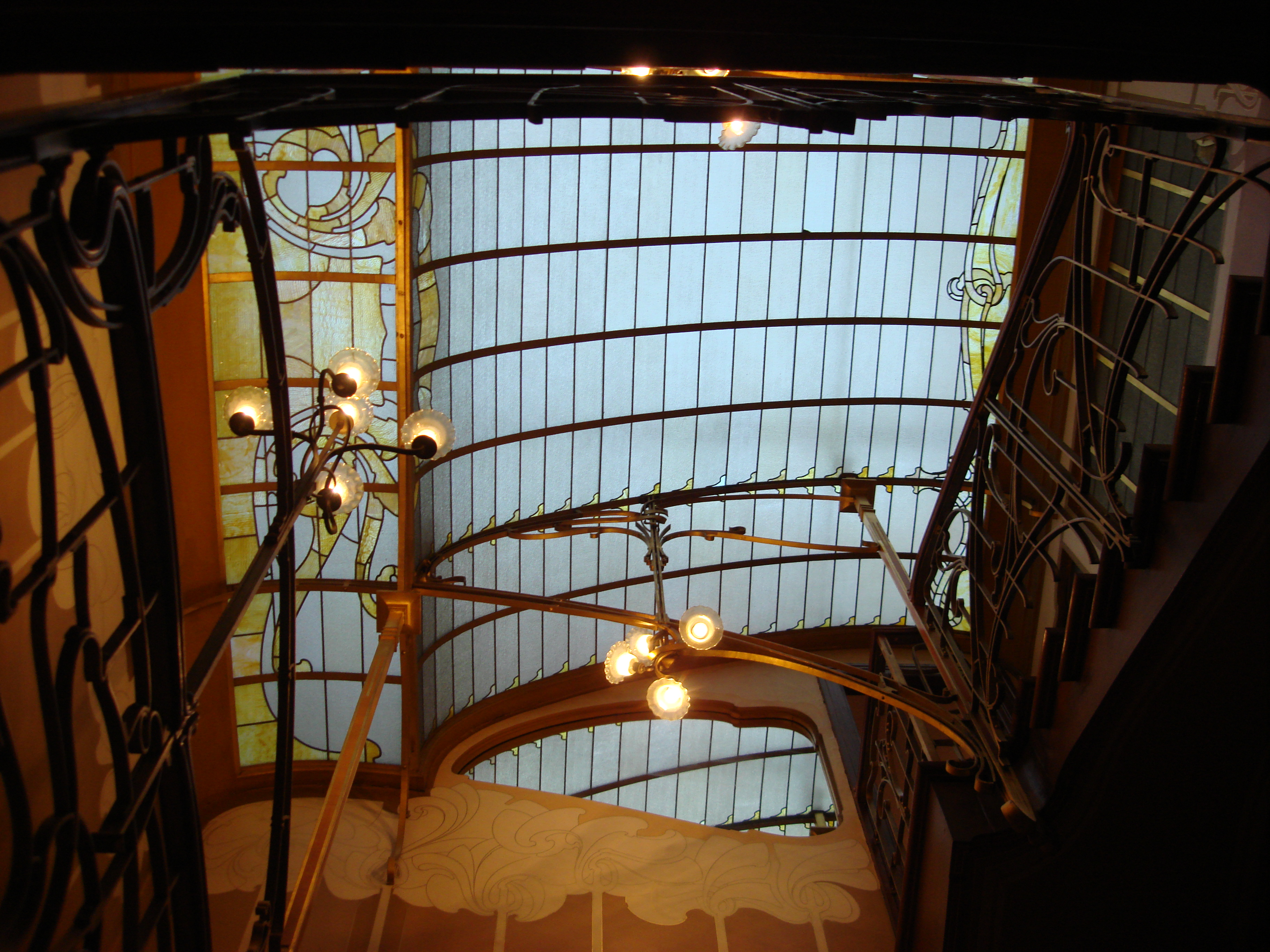
Skylight above the stairway of the Horta Museum (1898–1901)

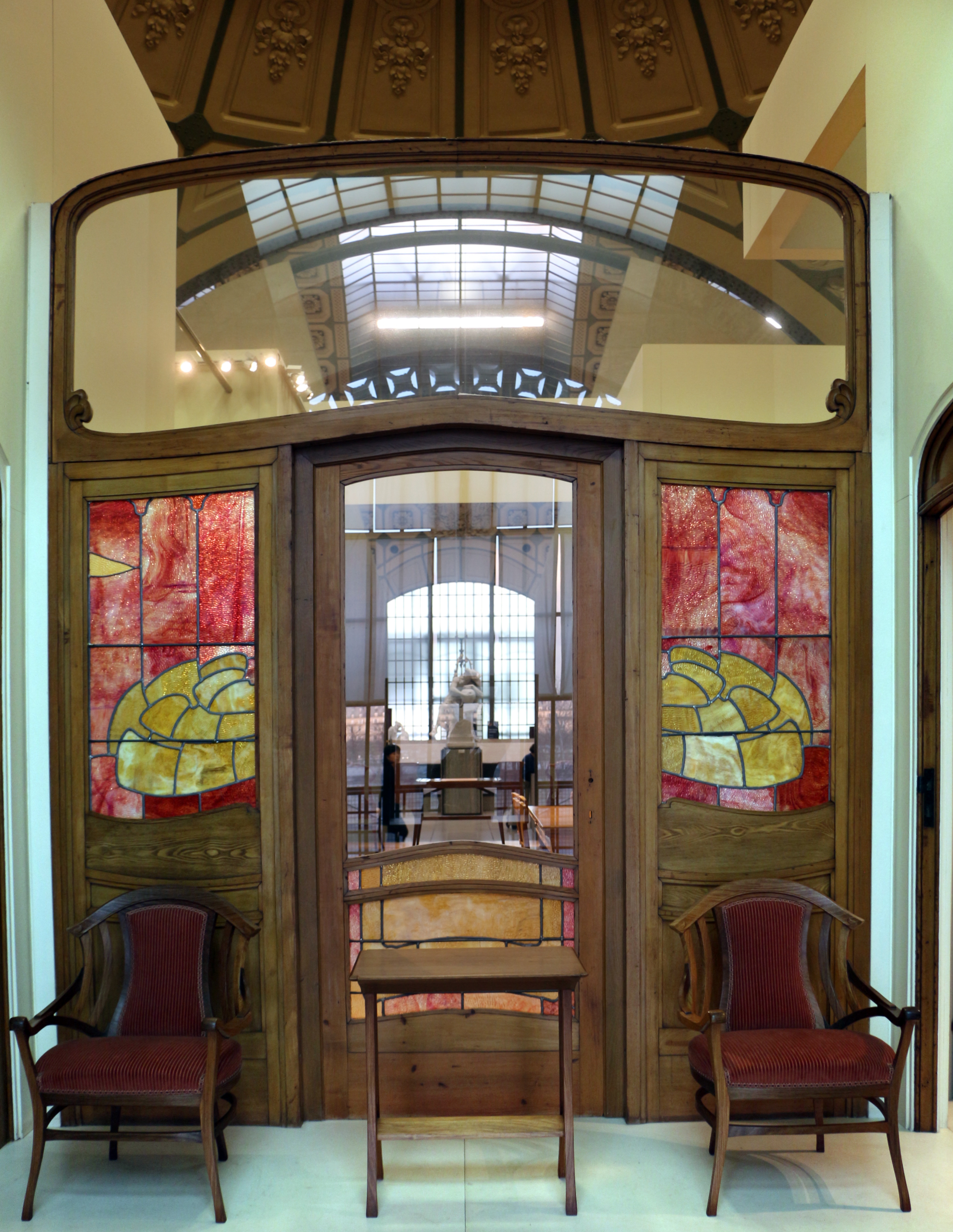
Furnishings of the Hôtel Aubecq by Horta (1899–1902) on display at the Musée d'Orsay, Paris

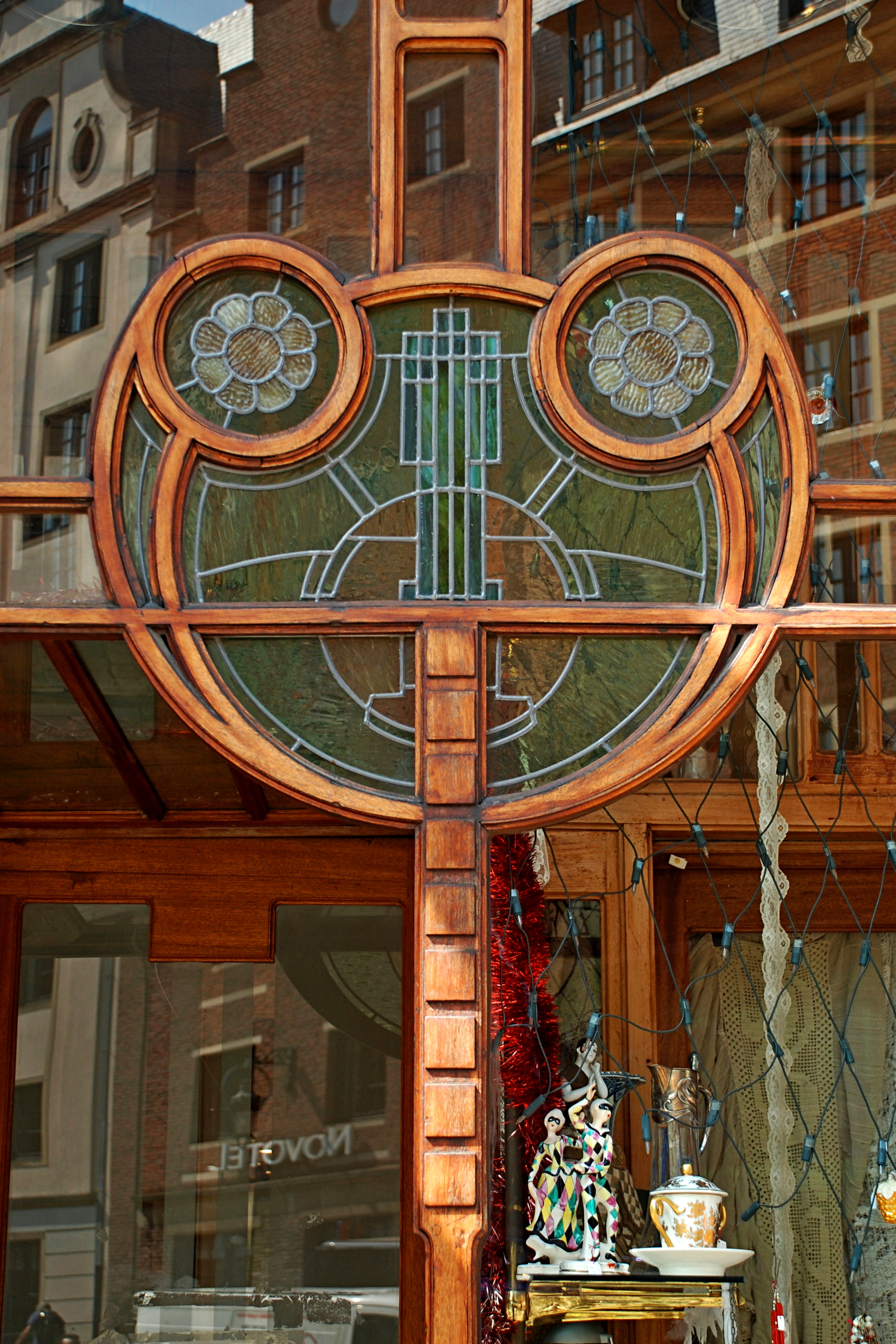
Detail of La Marjolaine storefront by Léon Sneyers (1904)

== Metal art ==
Art Nouveau architecture made use of many technological innovations of the late 19th century, especially the use of exposed iron and large, irregularly shaped pieces of glass for architecture. The French architectural theorist Eugène Viollet-le-Duc had advocated showing, rather than concealing the iron frameworks of modern buildings, but Brussels' Art Nouveau architects went a step further: they added iron decoration in curves inspired by floral and vegetal forms both in the interiors and exteriors of their buildings. They took the form of stairway railings, light fixtures, and other details in the interior, as well as balconies and other ornaments on the exterior.

Victor Horta, who had worked on the construction of iron and glass Royal Greenhouses of Laeken, was one of the first to create Art Nouveau ironwork. His use of wrought iron or cast iron in scrolling whiplash forms on doorways, balconies and gratings became some of the most distinctive features of Art Nouveau architecture. The use of metal decoration in vegetal forms soon also appeared in silverware, lamps, and other decorative items.

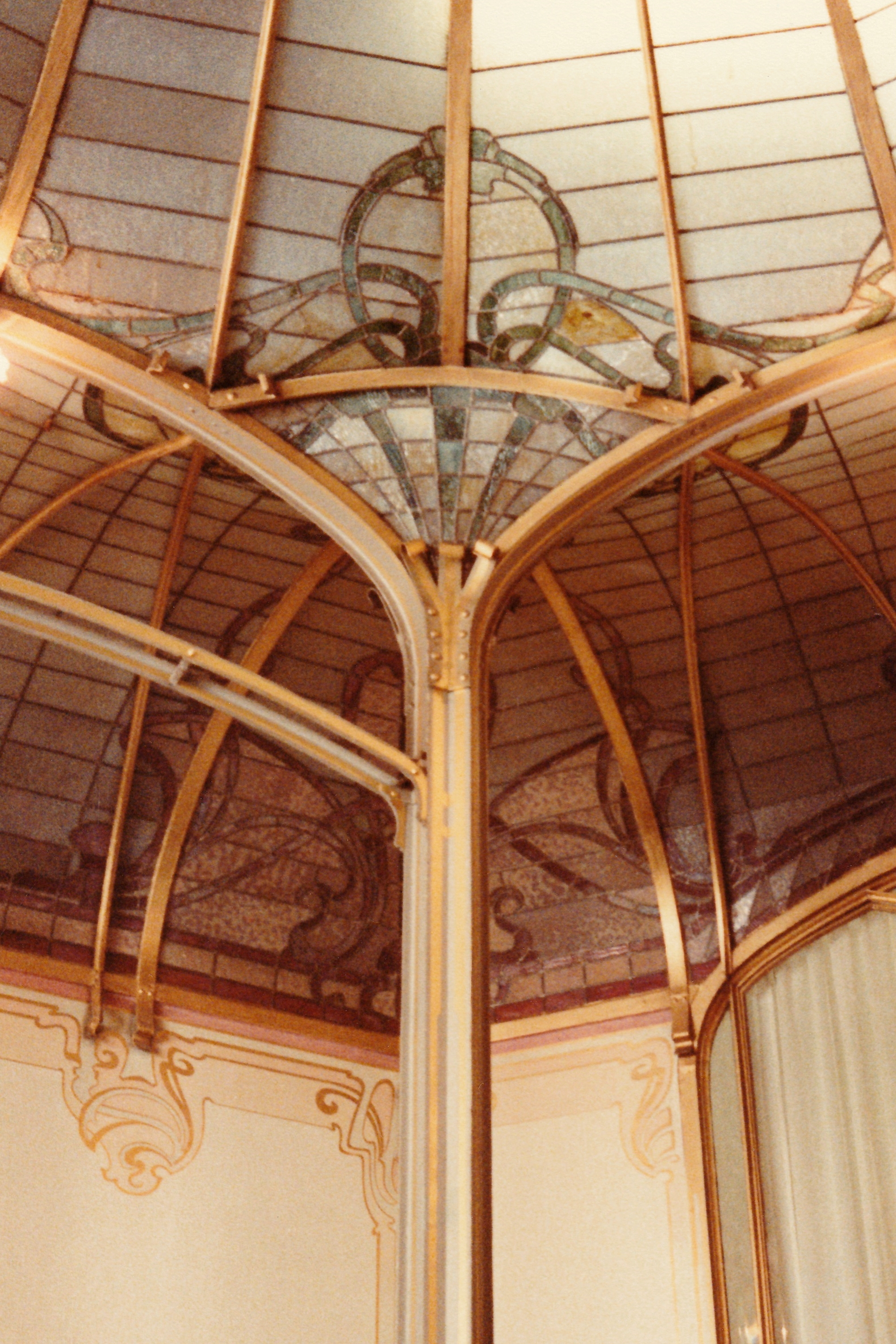
Detail of the Winter Garden of the Hôtel van Eetvelde by Victor Horta (1898–1900)

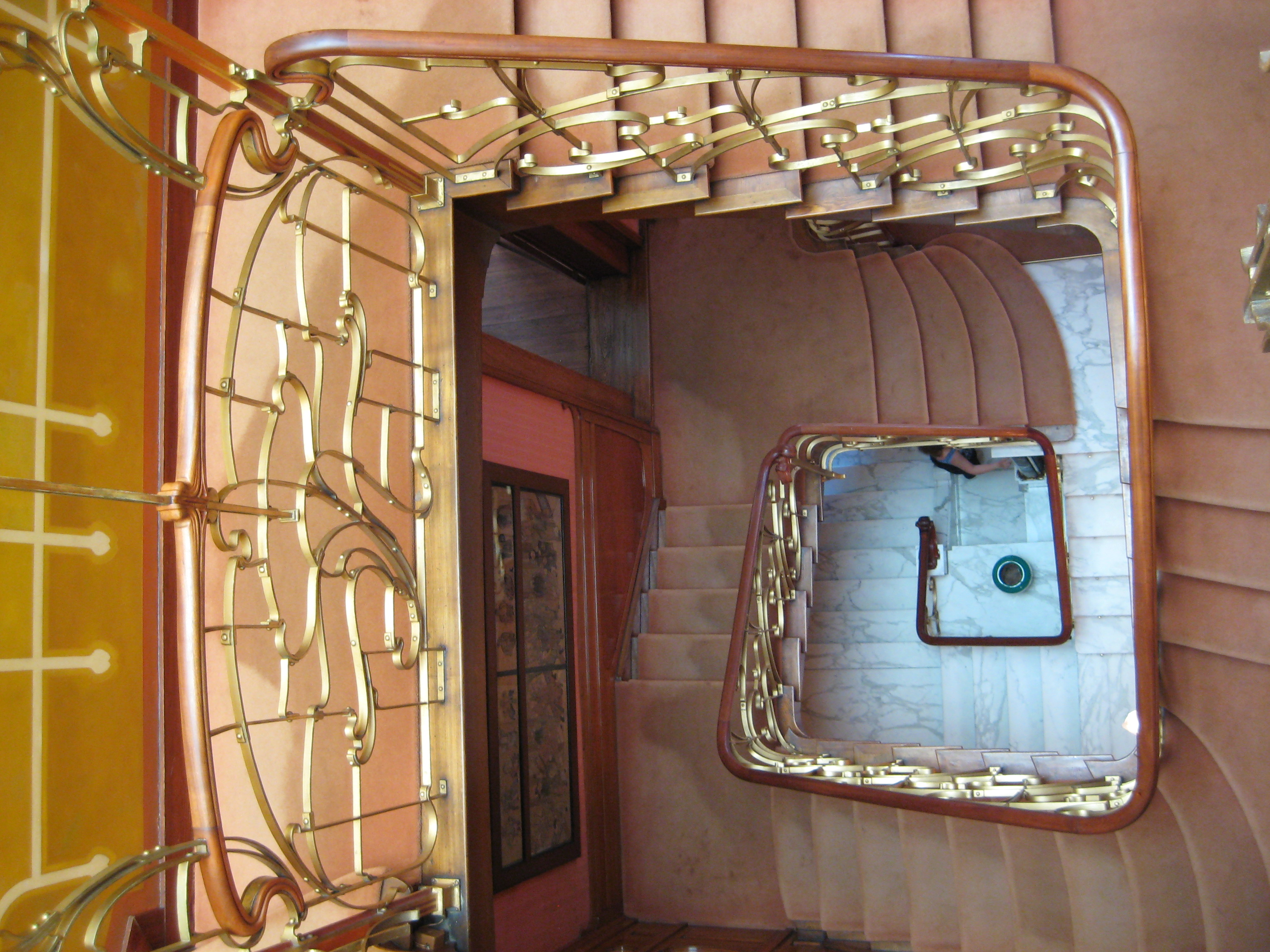
Spiral staircase in the Horta Museum (1898–1901)

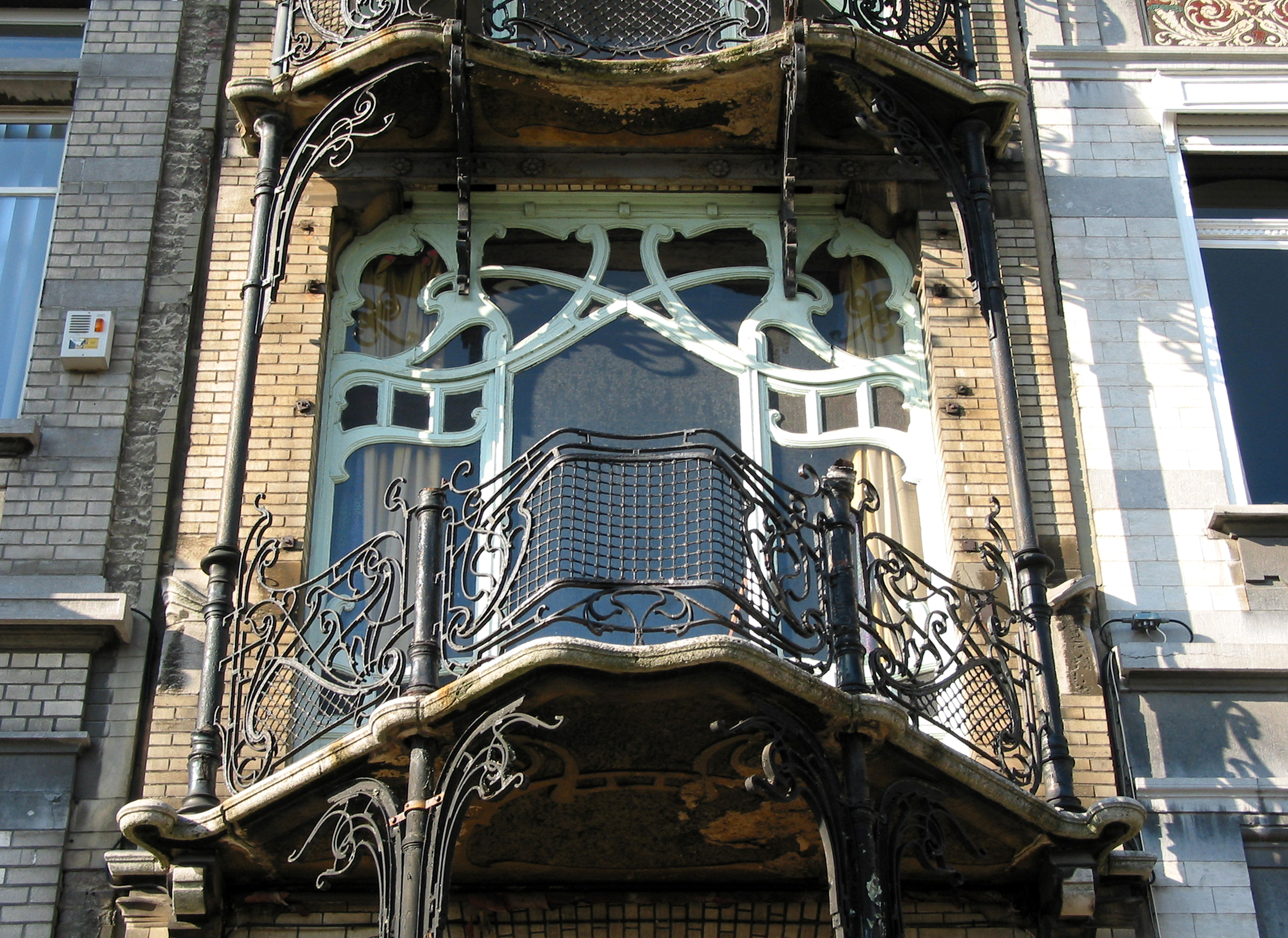
Wrought iron balconies of the Saint-Cyr House by Gustave Strauven (1901–1903)

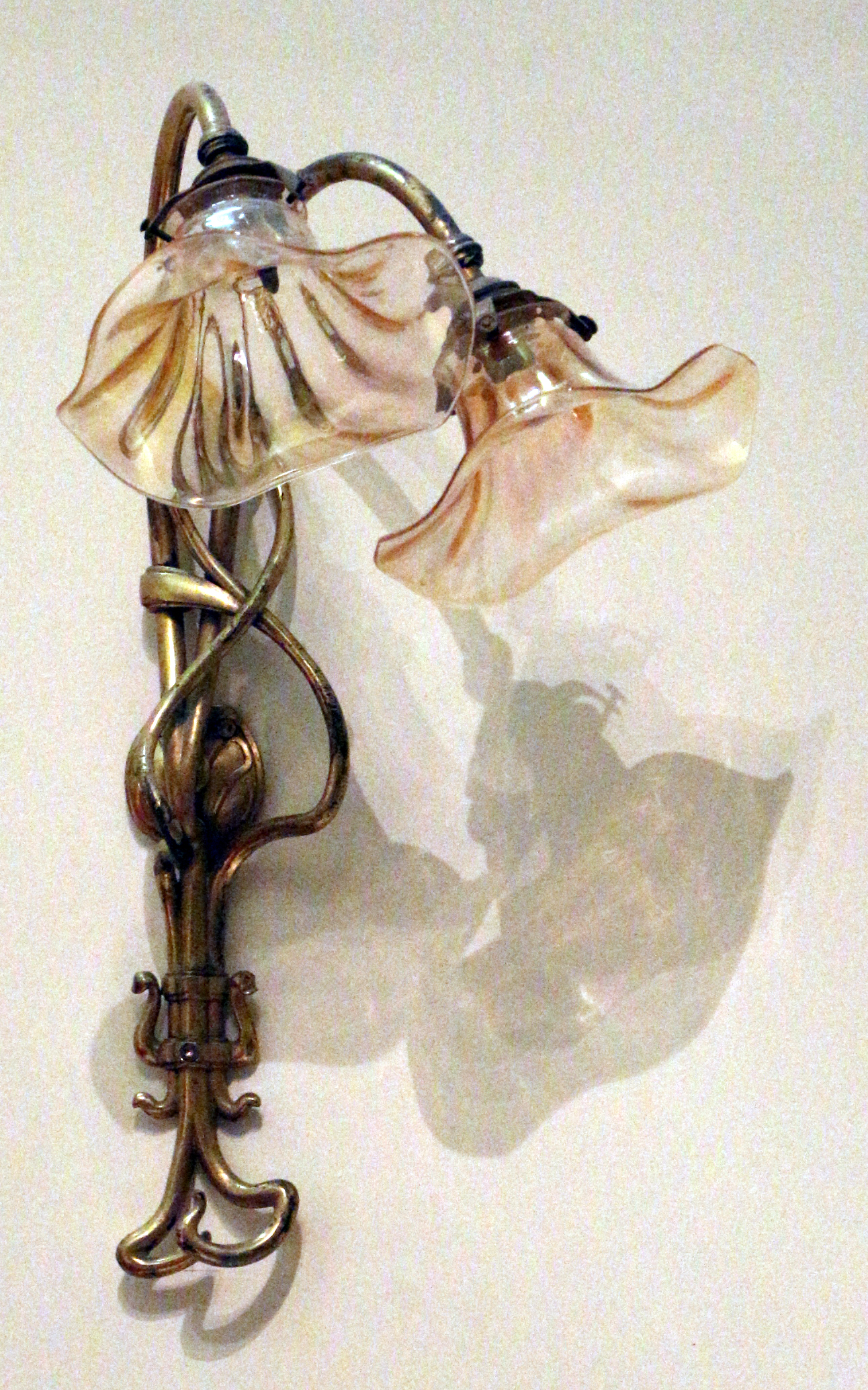
Light fixture by Horta (1903)

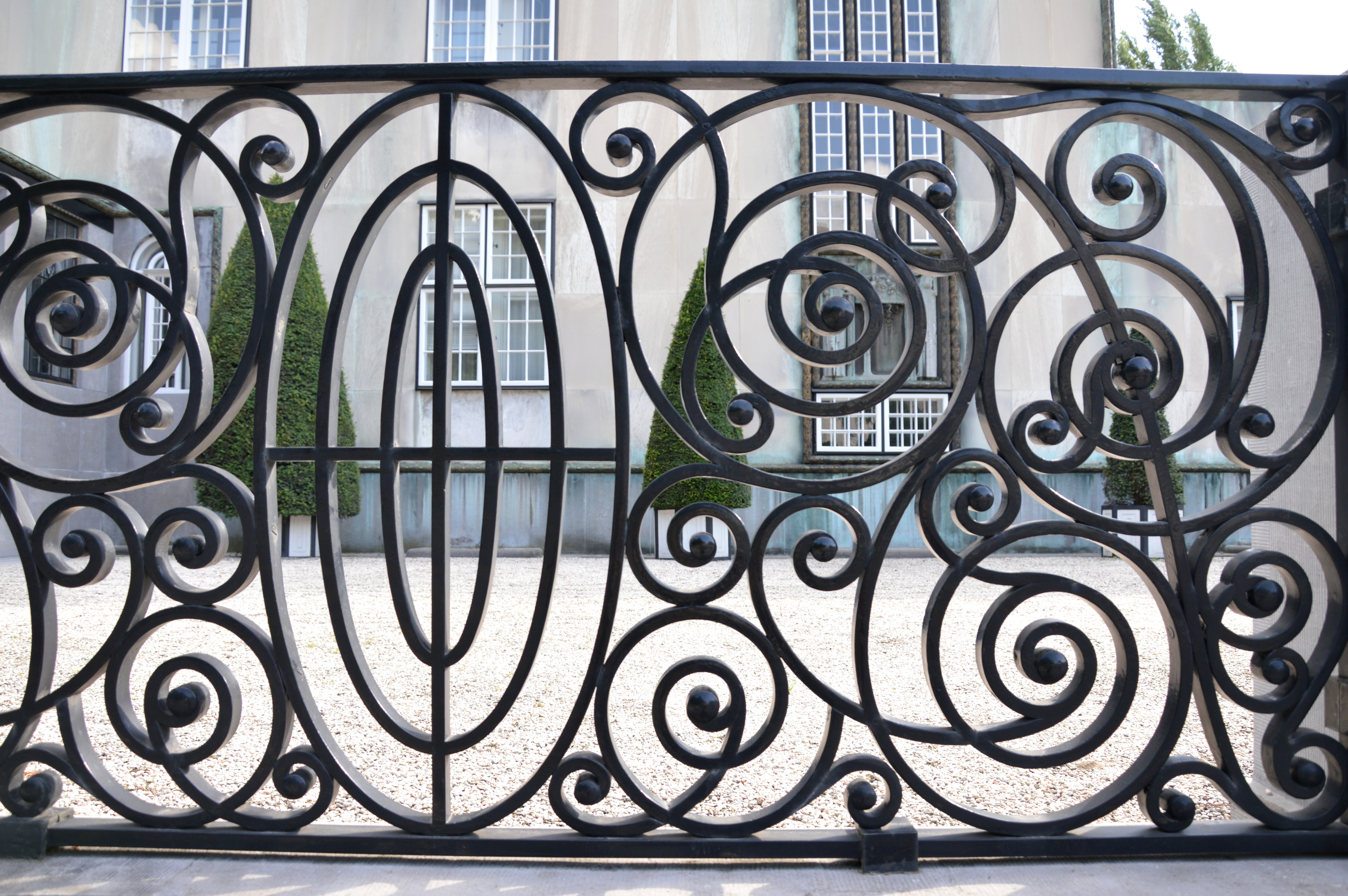
Gate of the Stoclet Palace by Josef Hoffmann (1905–1911)

== Furniture and decoration ==
Many Brussels architects, including Victor Horta and Henry Van de Velde, also designed the furniture and other interior decoration of their houses. The curving designs of the wood and patterns on the upholstery matched the designs of the walls and other interior features. The furniture was hand-made particularly for each house. One drawback of Art Nouveau was that the furniture could not be changed or replaced with a different style without disrupting the harmony of the room.

Another notable figure in early Belgian Art Nouveau furniture and design was Gustave Serrurier-Bovy (1858–1910). He lived for a time in England, and was influenced by works of William Morris and the Arts and Crafts Movement. His work showed the rustic influence of Arts and Crafts style, but he added his own elements of asymmetry. He also combined different types of furniture into single units, such as a desk with an attached bookcase, chest of drawers, and cupboard. His later work was much more geometrical, well on the path towards modernism.

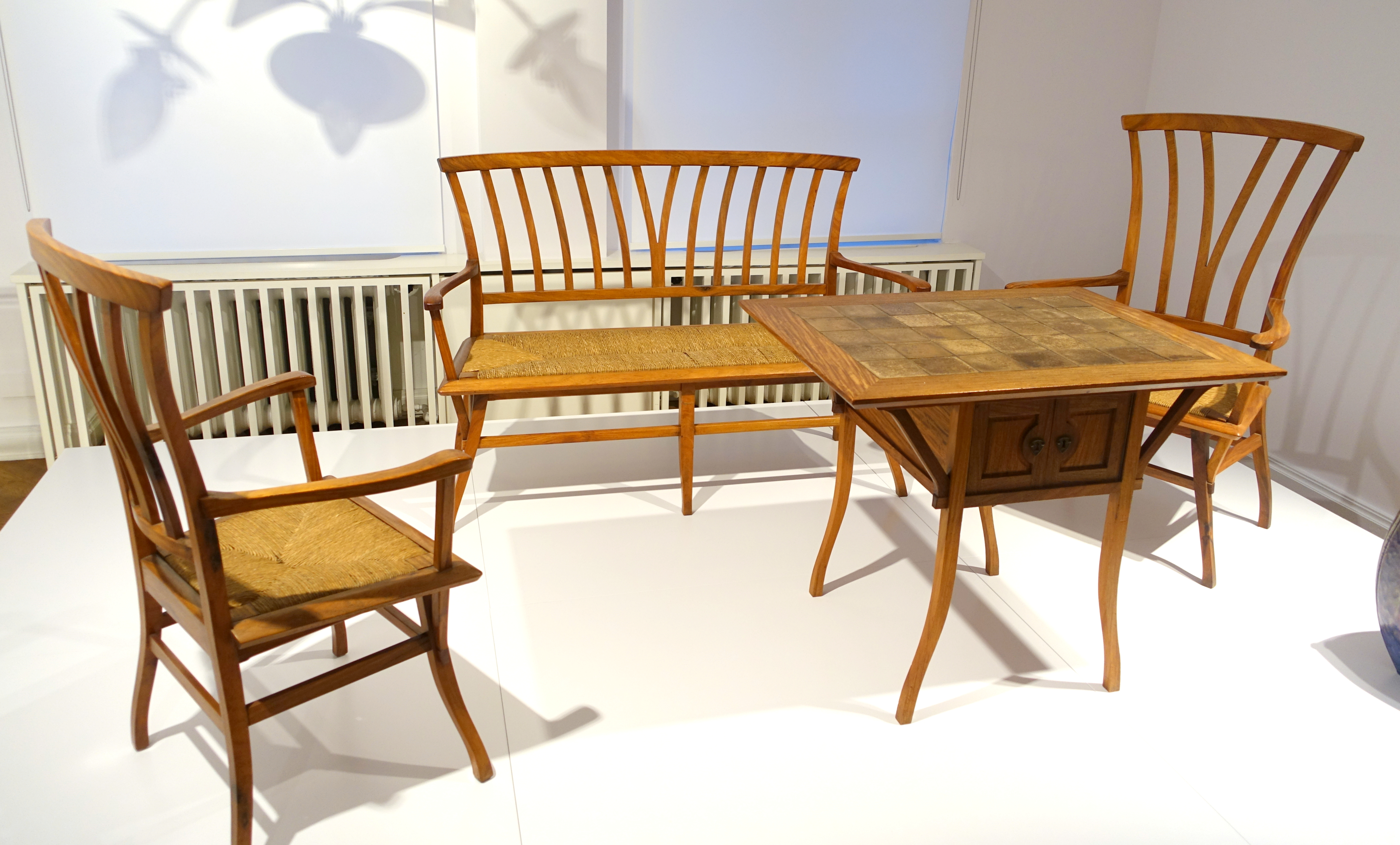
Furniture designed by Henry Van de Velde for the Villa Bloemenwerf (1895)

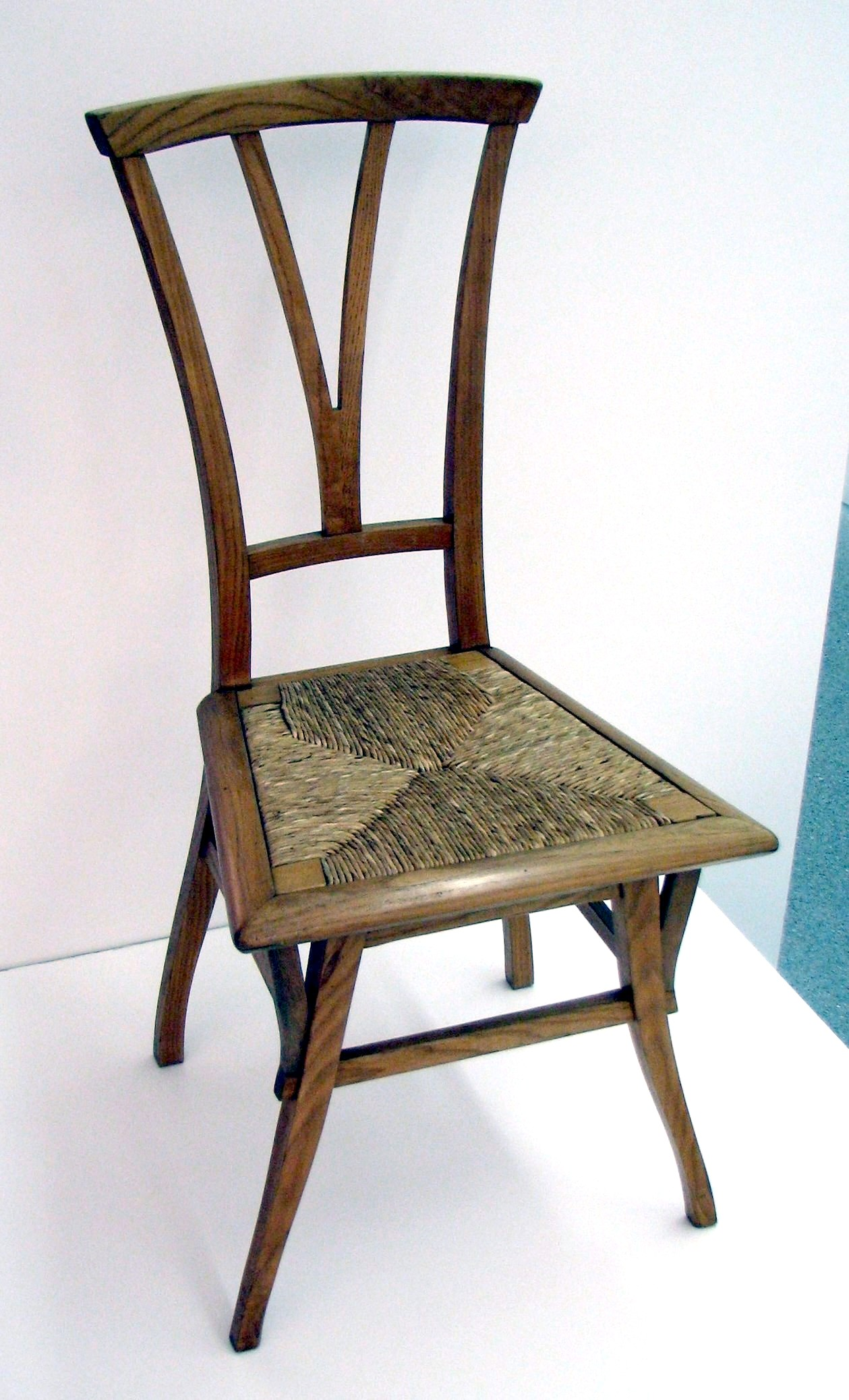
Chair by Van de Velde for the Villa Bloemenwerf (1895)

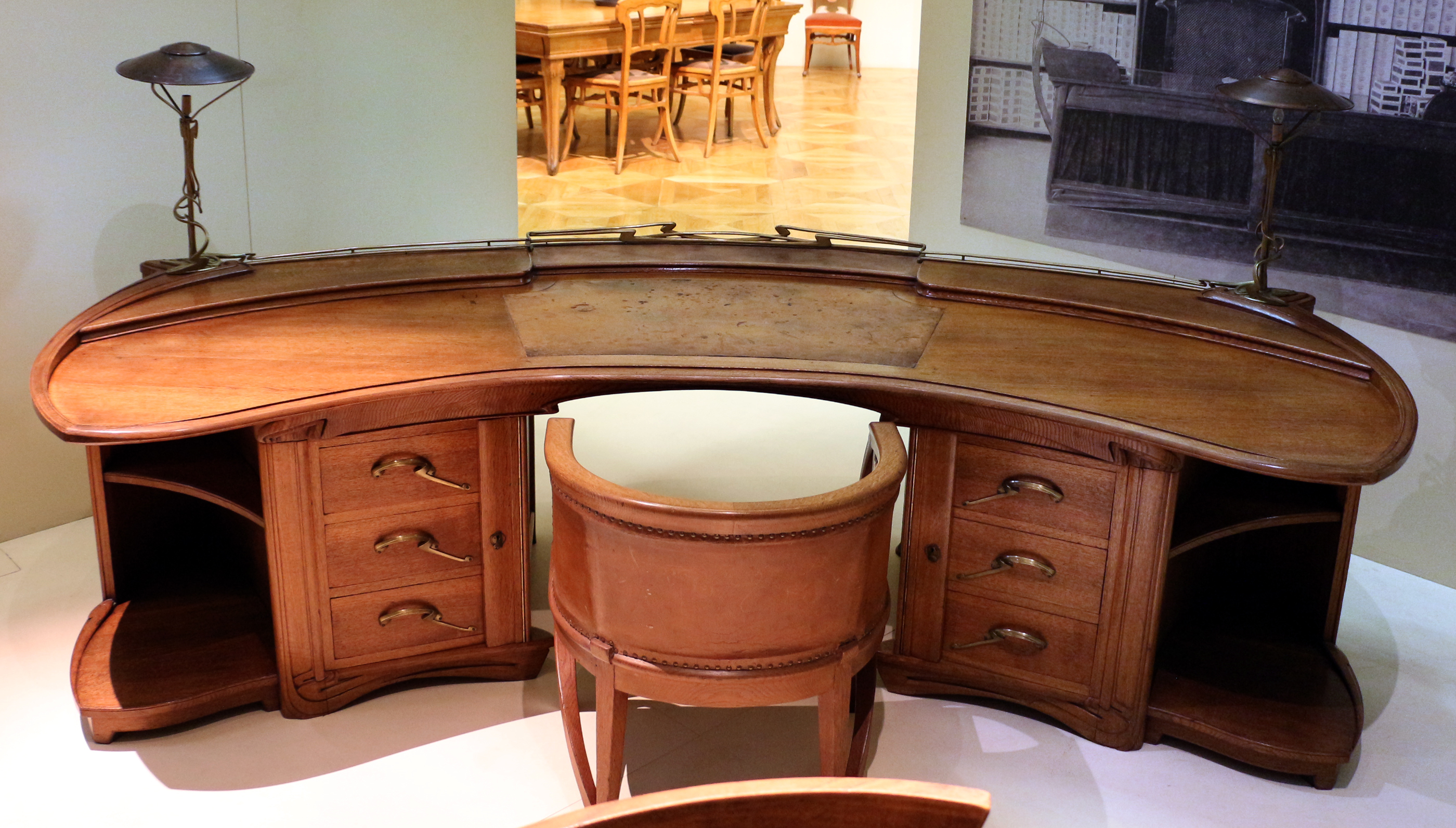
Desk, chair and lamps by Van de Velde (1898–99) (Musée d'Orsay, Paris)

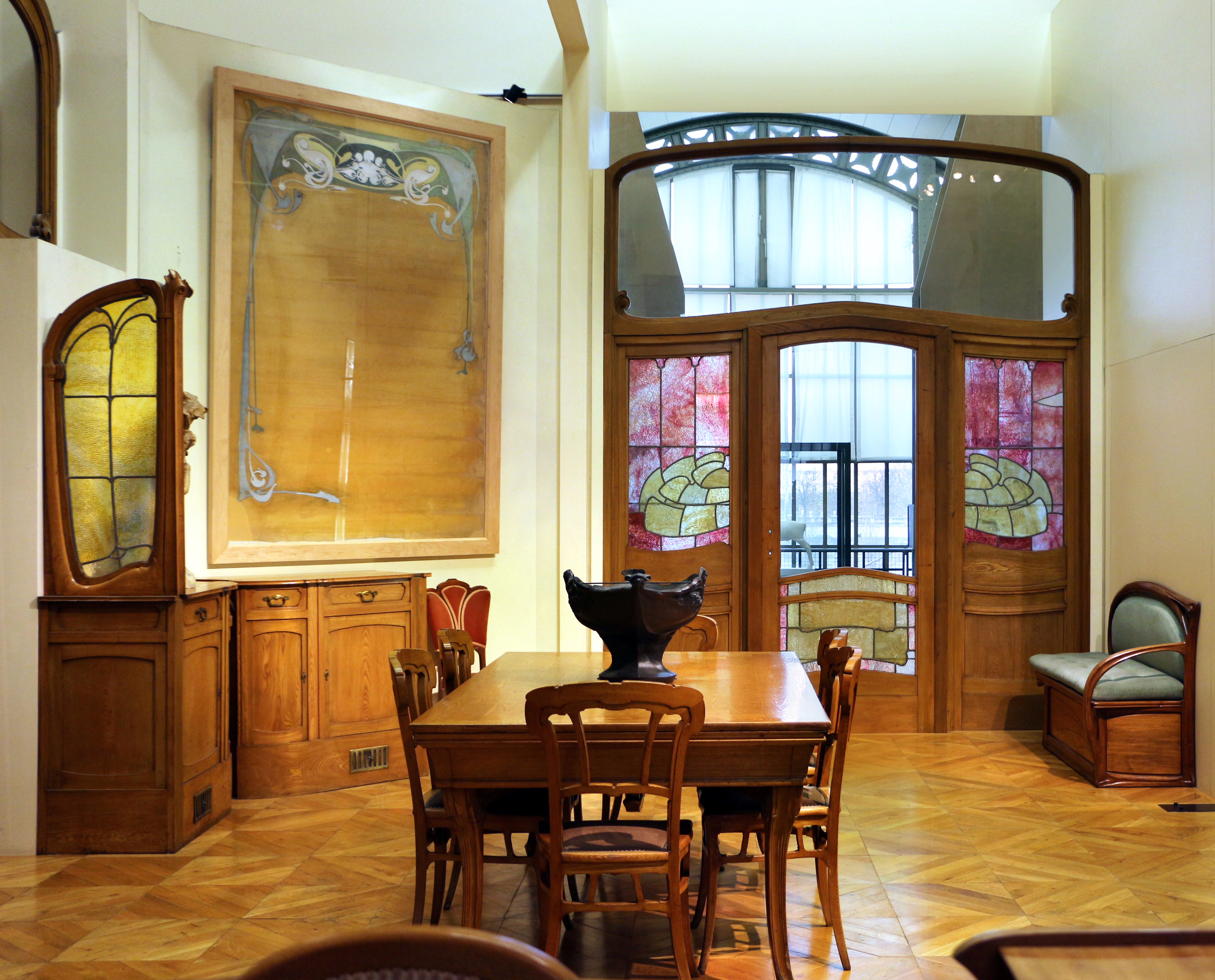
Dining room furniture and wall panel by Victor Horta from the Hôtel Aubecq (1899–1902), now in the Musée d'Orsay

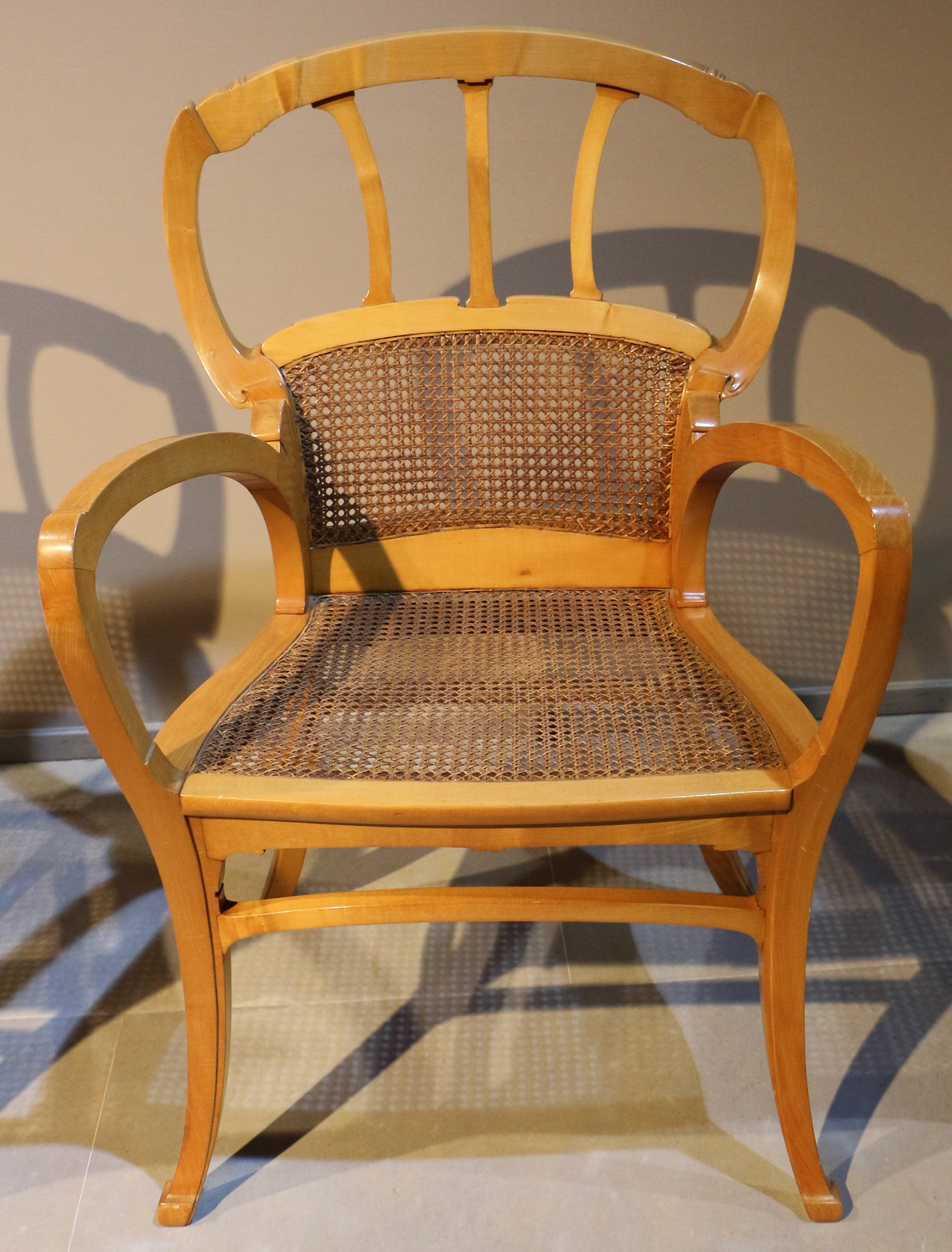
Chair by Horta from the Hôtel Aubecq, now in the Musée d'Orsay

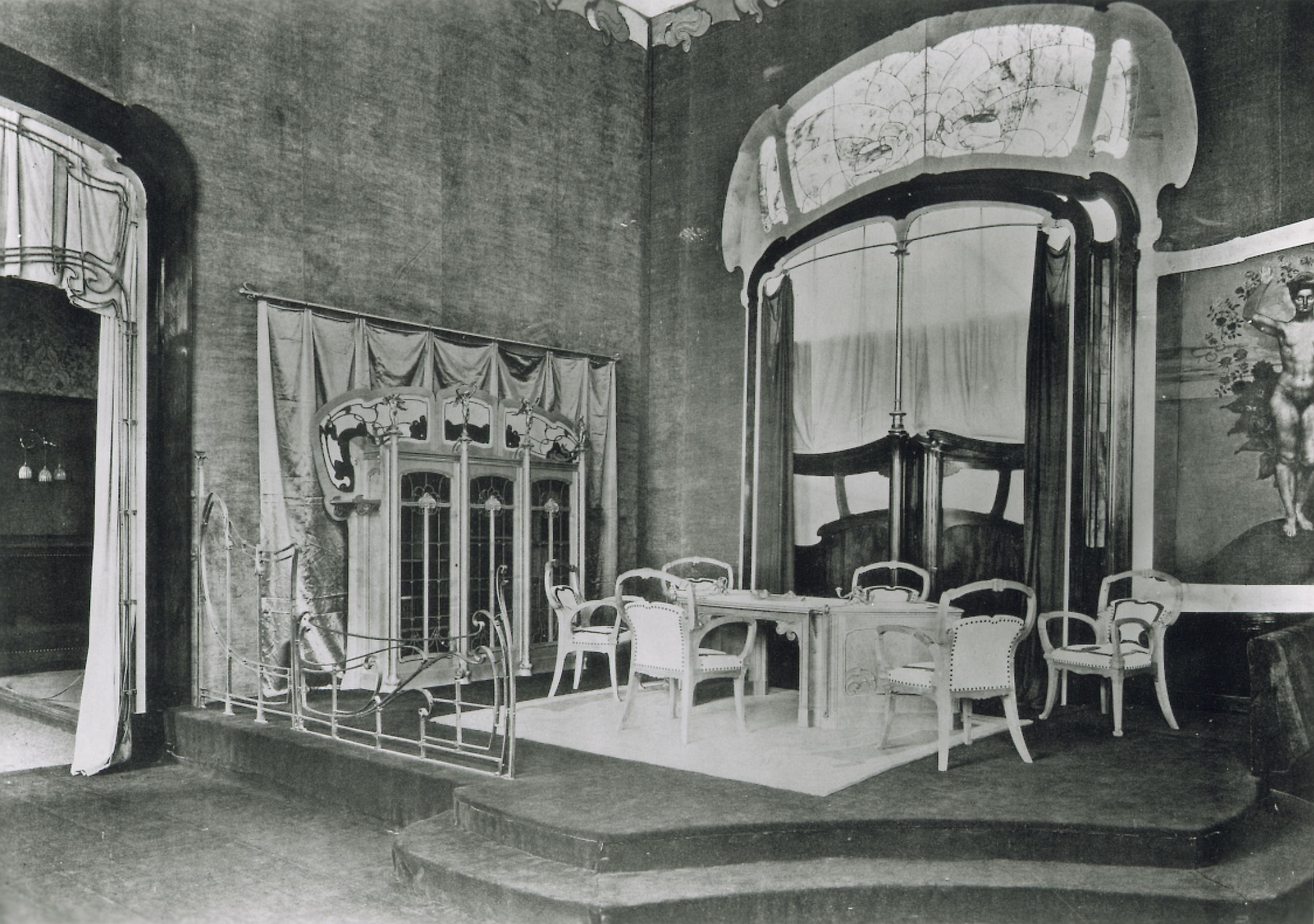
Dining room by Horta displayed at the 1902 Turin International Exposition

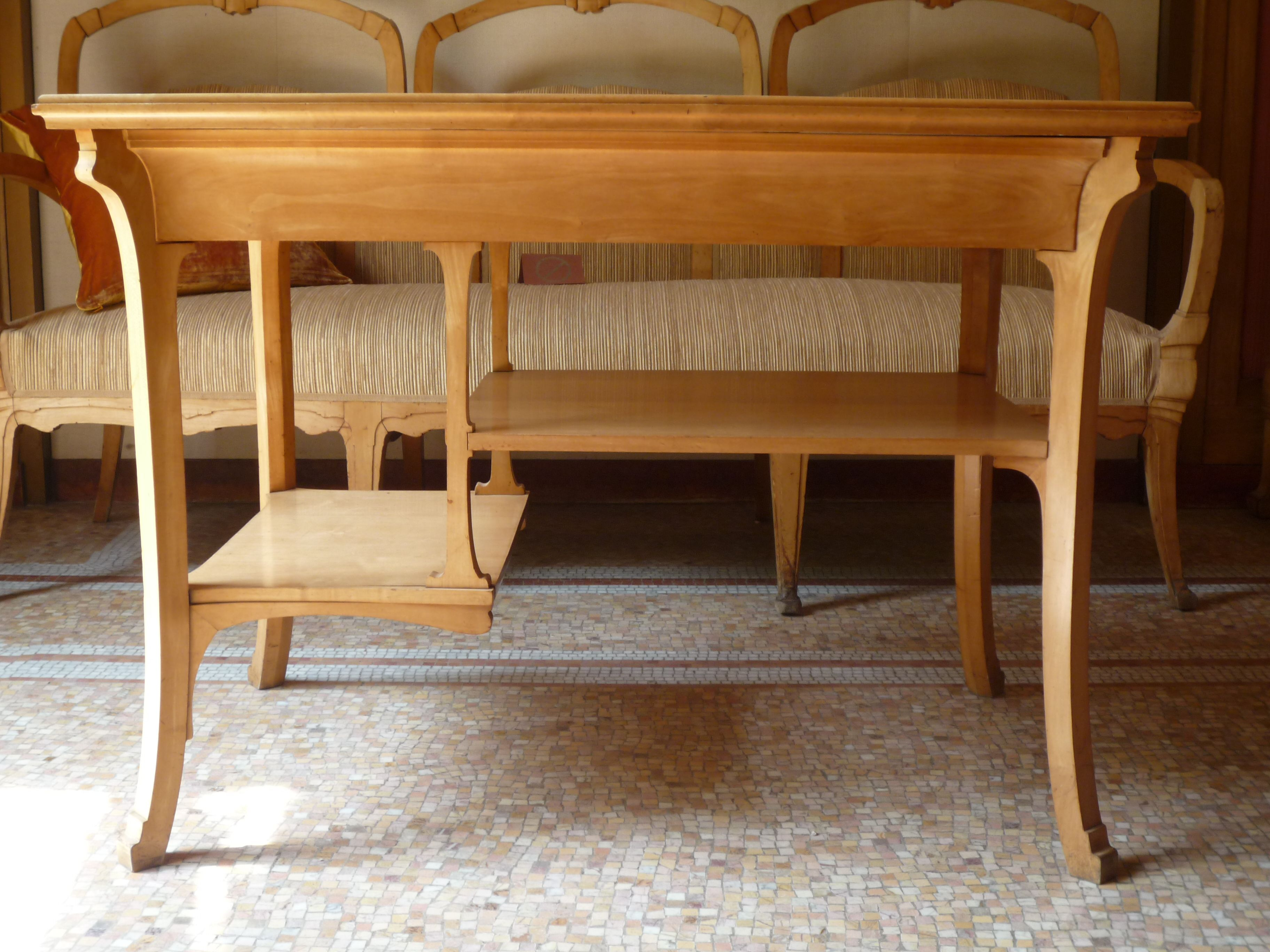
Table designed by Horta, probably for the 1902 Turin Exposition

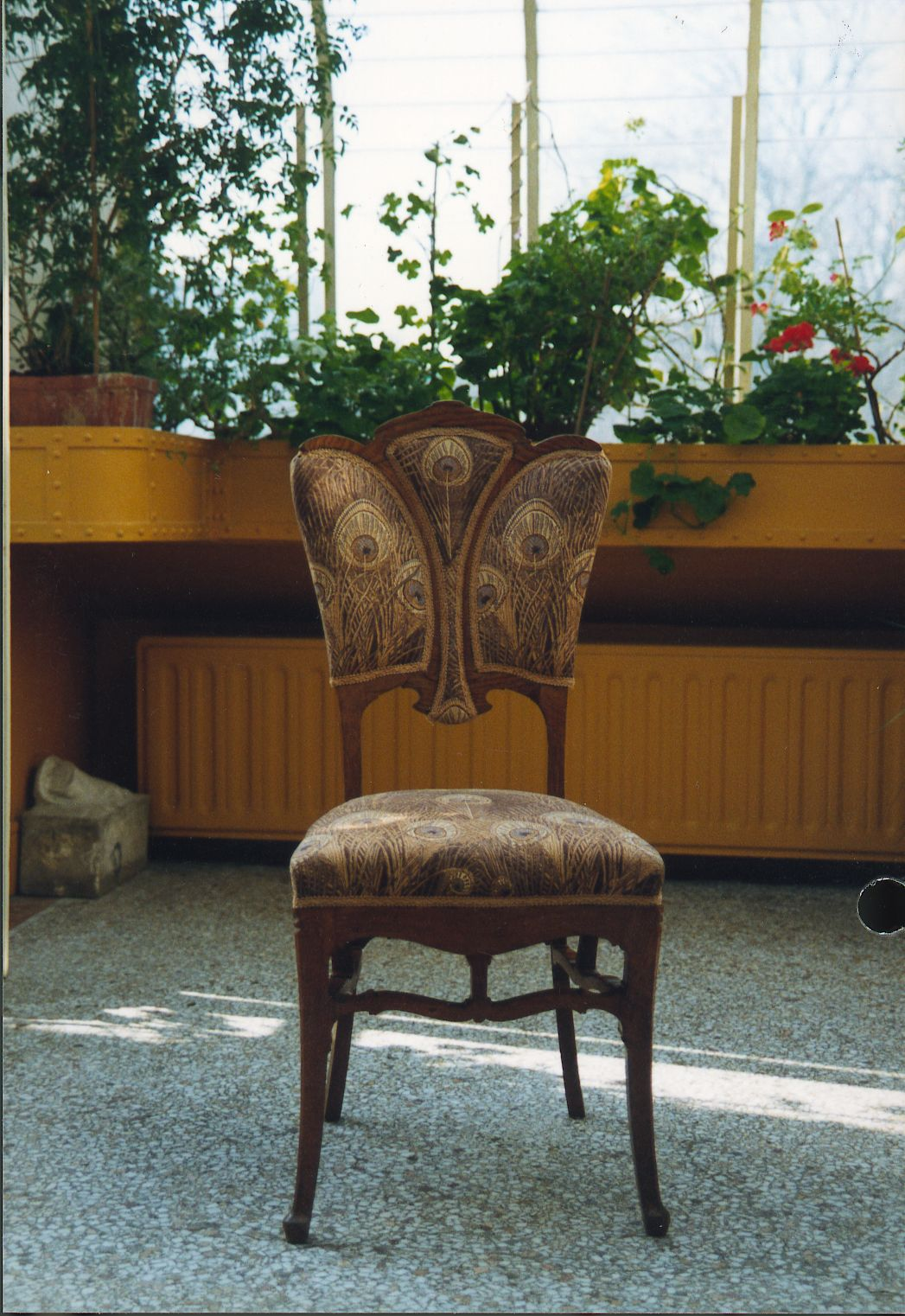
Peacock Chair by Horta from either the Hôtel Tassel or the Castle of La Hulpe

Mahogany chair by Horta (1900) (Cleveland Museum of Art)

== Jewellery ==
The most prominent Art Nouveau jeweller in Brussels was Philippe Wolfers. He was also a sculptor and silversmith, and combined these different skills in a variety of works. He designed jewellery and other objects based on insects, plants, and animals, using previous materials and natural curving forms. His work often crossed the frontiers between sculpture and decorative art, inspired by the lines of forms ranging from dragonflies to bats to Grecian masks. An example is a pendant with a pearl and a swan surrounded by serpents. Another important figure was Frans Hoosemans, who made small works of sculpture, candlesticks and other objects using ivory, silver, and other precious materials.

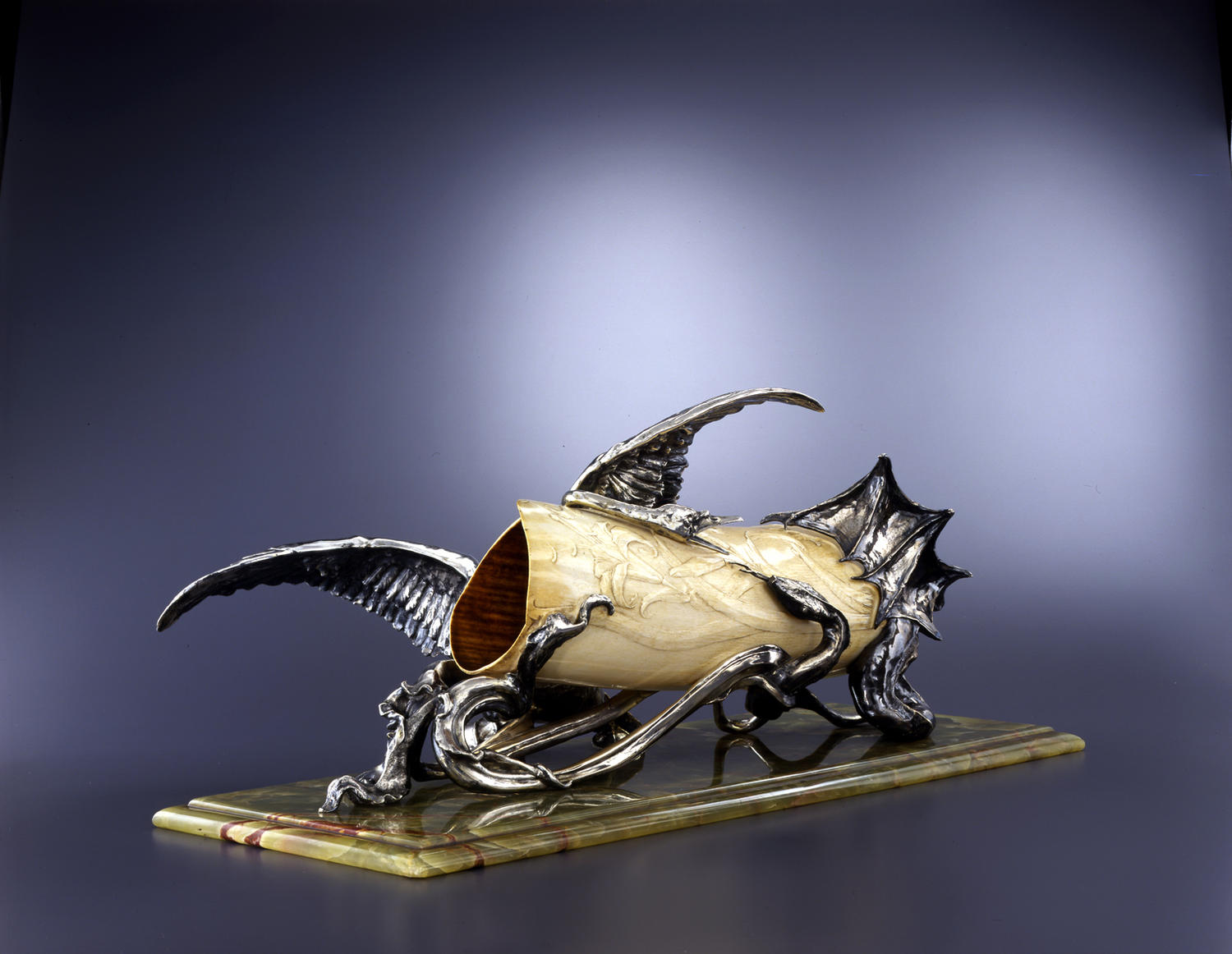
A vase made of silver, onyx and ivory by Philippe Wolfers (1897)

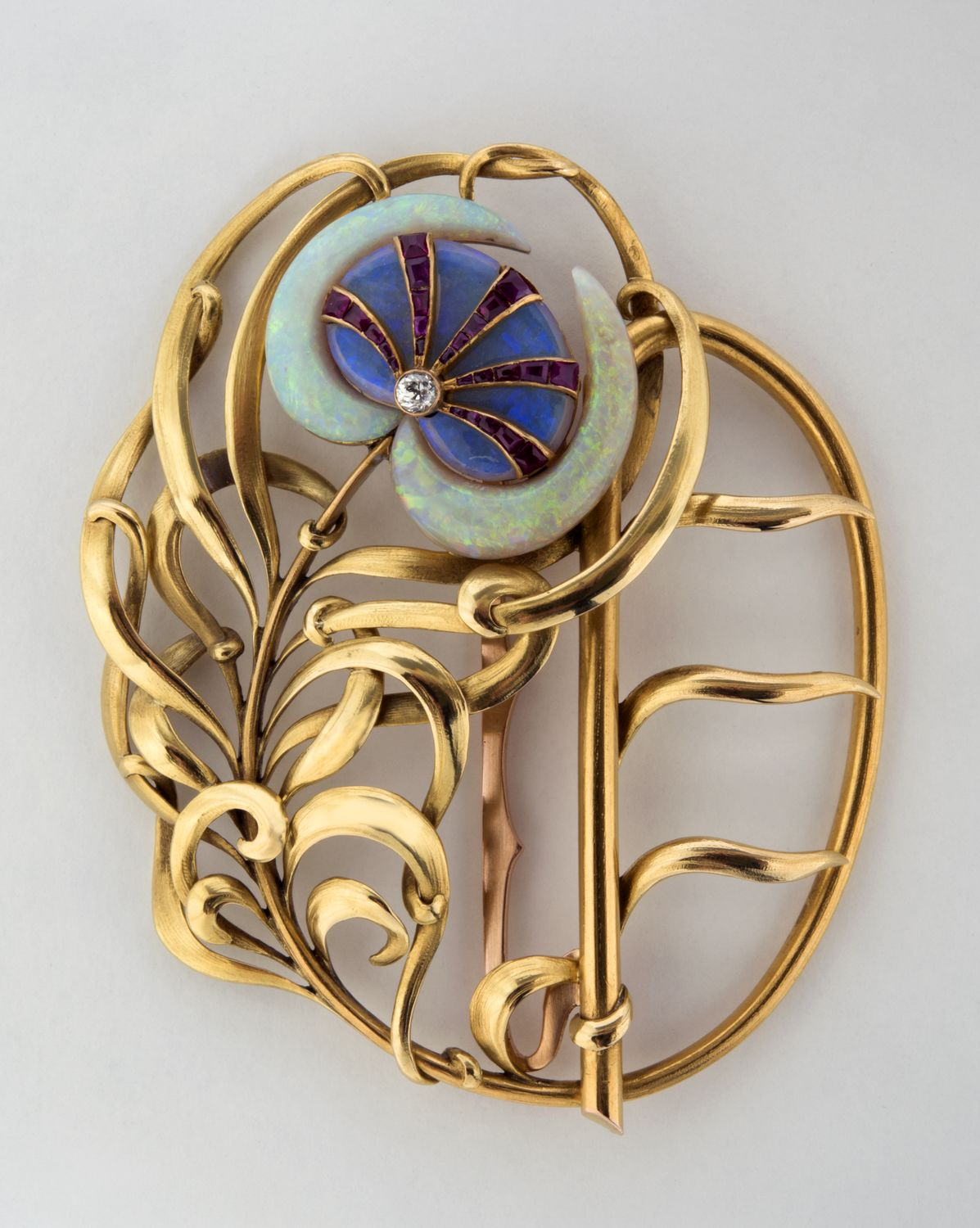
Plumes de Paon ("Peacock Feathers"), belt buckle by Wolfers (1898)

Cygne et Serpents ("Swan and Serpents"), pendant by Wolfers (1899–1900)

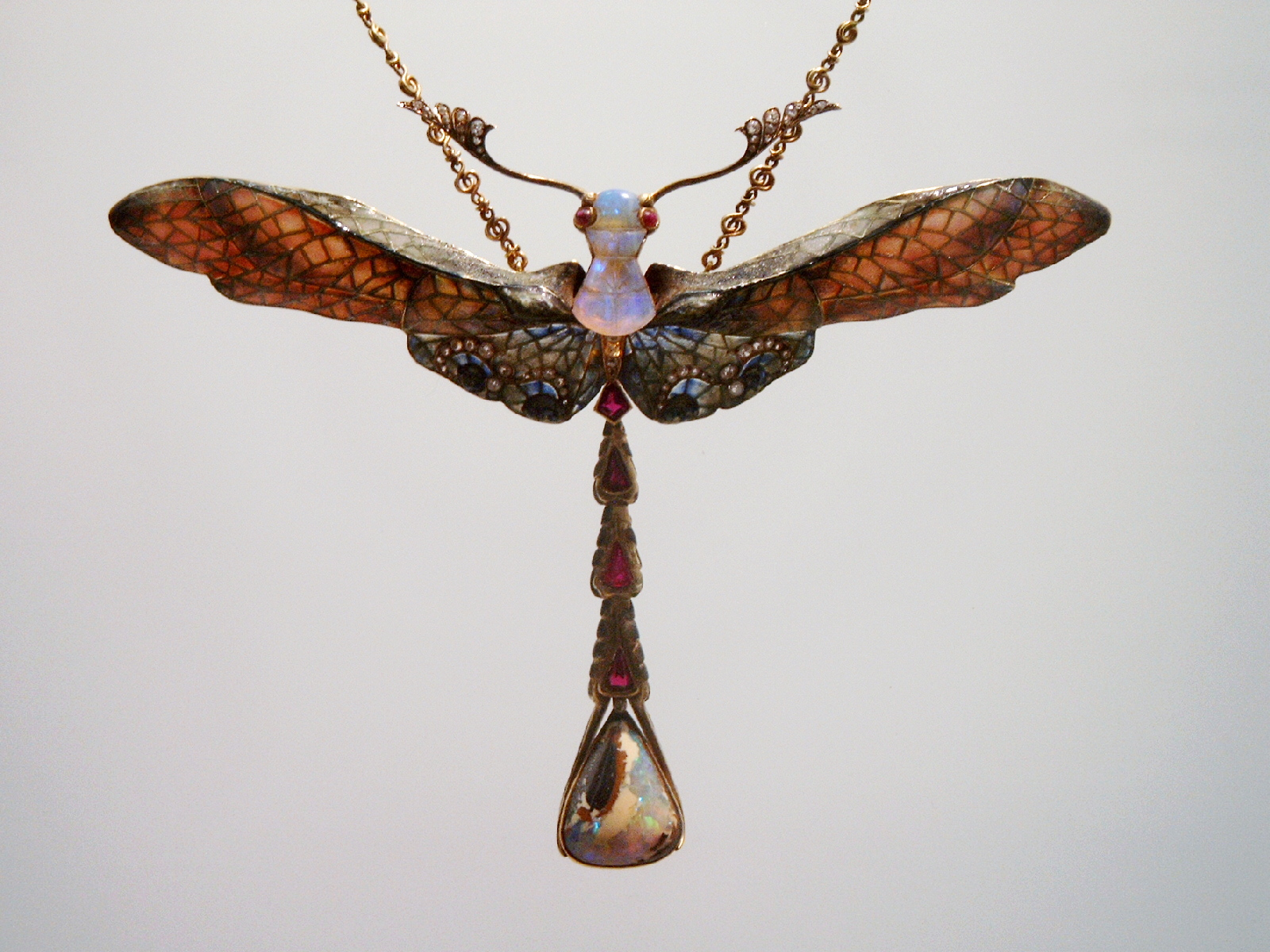
Libelle ("Dragonfly"), pendant made of gold, opal, enamel, rubies and diamonds by Wolfers (1902)

== Protection status ==
Among Brussels' Art Nouveau creations, four buildings by Victor Horta were added to the UNESCO World Heritage List in 2000 under the title "Major town houses of the architect Victor Horta (Brussels)": the Hôtel Tassel, the Hôtel Solvay, the Hôtel van Eetvelde and the Horta House (currently the Horta Museum).

The Stoclet Palace, built between 1905 and 1911 by the Austrian architect Josef Hoffmann, one of the founders of the Viennese Secession, has also been listed as a World Heritage Site since 2009.

== See also ==
- Art Nouveau in Antwerp
- Art Deco in Brussels
- History of Brussels
- Culture of Belgium
- Belgium in the long nineteenth century
