= Victor Horta =

Belgian architect and designer (1861–1947)

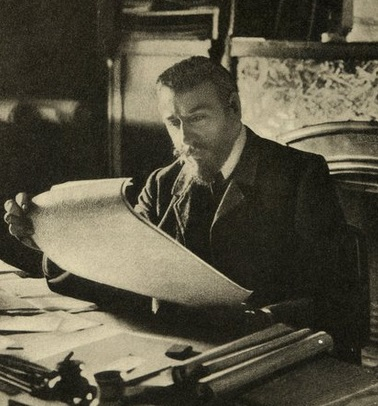
- Horta c. 1900
- Born: 6 January 1861; Ghent, East Flanders, Belgium
- Died: 8 September 1947 (aged 86); Brussels, Brabant, Belgium
- Occupation: Architect
- Awards: Titled "Baron" by King Albert I of Belgium; Prix Godecharle (1884)
- Buildings: Hôtel Tassel; Horta House and Studio; Hôtel van Eetvelde; Hôtel Solvay; Centre for Fine Arts in Brussels
- Projects: Brussels-Central railway station

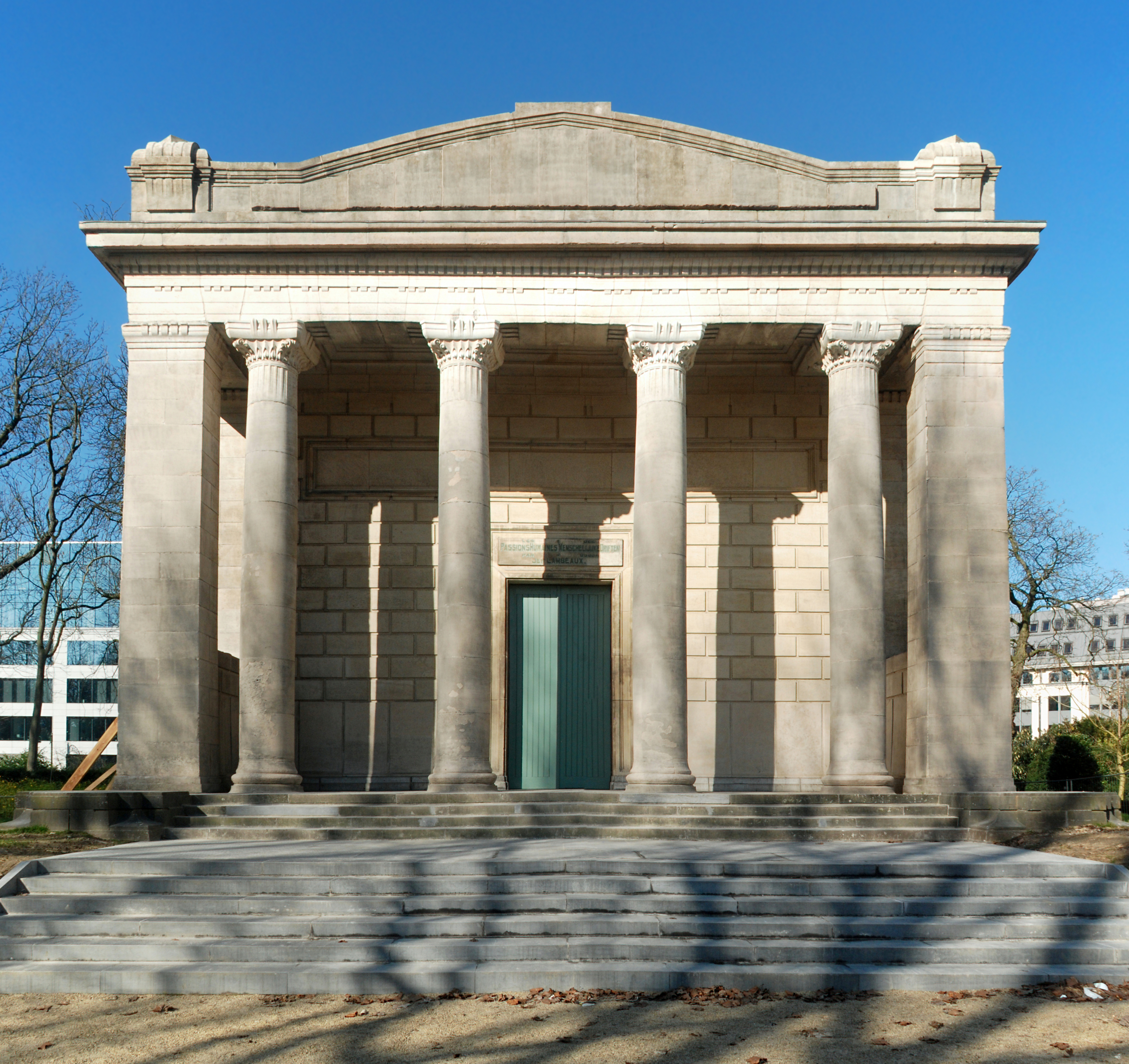
Pavilion of Human Passions, Brussels (1890–1897)

Victor Pierre Horta (French: [viktɔʁ ɔʁta]; Victor, Baron Horta after 1932; 6 January 1861 – 8 September 1947) was a Belgian architect and designer, and one of the founders of the Art Nouveau movement. He was a fervent admirer of the French architectural theorist Eugène Viollet-le-Duc; his Hôtel Tassel in Brussels (1892–93), often considered the first Art Nouveau house, is based on the work of Viollet-le-Duc. The curving stylized vegetal forms that Horta used in turn influenced many others, including the French architect Hector Guimard, who used it in the first Art Nouveau apartment building he designed in Paris and in the entrances he designed for the Paris Metro. He is also considered a precursor of modern architecture for his open floor plans and his innovative use of iron, steel and glass.

Horta's later work moved away from Art Nouveau, and became more geometric and formal, with classical touches, such as columns. He made a highly original use of steel frames and skylights to bring light into the structures, open floor plans, and finely-designed decorative details. His later major works included the Maison du Peuple/Volkshuis (1895–1899), Brussels' Centre for Fine Arts (1923–1929) and Brussels-Central railway station (1913–1952). In 1932, King Albert I conferred on Horta the title of Baron for his services to the field of architecture.

After Art Nouveau lost favor, many of Horta's buildings were abandoned, or even destroyed, though his work has since been rehabilitated. Four of the buildings he designed in Brussels were added to the UNESCO World Heritage List in 2000: the Hôtel Tassel, the Hôtel Solvay, the Hôtel van Eetvelde and the Horta House (currently the Horta Museum).

== Life and early work ==
Victor Horta was born in Ghent, Belgium, on 6 January 1861. His father was a master shoemaker, who, as Horta recalled, considered craftsmanship a high form of art. The young Horta began by studying music at the Royal Conservatory of Ghent. He was expelled for misbehavior and went instead to study at the Royal Academy of Fine Arts in Ghent. At the Ghent Conservatory, an aula is named after him today. When he was seventeen, he moved to Paris and found work with the architect and designer Jules Debuysson.

Horta's father died in 1880, and Horta returned to Belgium. He moved to Brussels and married his first wife, with whom he later fathered two daughters. He began to study architecture at the Royal Academy of Fine Arts in Brussels. He became friends with Paul Hankar, another early pioneer of Art Nouveau architecture. Horta did well in his studies and was taken on as an assistant by his professor Alphonse Balat, the architect to King Leopold II. Horta worked with Balat on the construction of the Royal Greenhouses of Laeken in northern Brussels, Horta's first work to utilise glass and iron. In 1884, Horta won the first Prix Godecharle to be awarded for architecture for a proposed new building for the Belgian Parliament. On his graduation from the Royal Academy, he was awarded the Grand Prize in architecture.

In the years that followed, Horta joined the Central Society of Belgian Architecture, designed and completed three houses in a traditional style, and took part in several competitions. In 1892, he was named head of the Department of Graphic Design for Architecture at the Free University of Brussels, and promoted to professor in 1893. At this time, through lectures and exhibitions organised by the artists' group Les XX, Horta became familiar with the British Arts and Crafts Movement, the developments in book design, and especially textiles and wallpaper, which influenced his later work.

In 1893, Horta built a town house, the Autrique House for his friend Eugène Autrique. The interior had a traditional floor plan, due to a limited budget, but the facade previewed some of the elements he developed into the full Art Nouveau style, including iron columns and ceramic floral designs. In 1894, Horta was elected President of the Central Society of Belgian Architecture, although he resigned the following year following a dispute caused when he was awarded the commission for a kindergarten on the Rue Saint-Ghislain/Sint-Gissleinsstraat in the Marolles/Marollen district of Brussels, without a public competition.

Throughout his life, Horta was greatly influenced by the French architectural theorist Eugène Viollet-le-Duc, whose ideas he completely identified with. In 1925, he wrote:

Since 1840, the theories of Viollet-le-Duc are a sharp, precise and constructive analysis of each element in architecture, bringing the whole of architecture to its absolute origin – a construction out of which any form of art can emerge.

== The town houses and the beginning of Art Nouveau ==
=== Hôtel Tassel (1892–93) ===
The major breakthrough for Horta came in 1892, when he was commissioned to design a home for the scientist and professor Émile Tassel. The Hôtel Tassel was completed in 1893. The stone facade, designed to harmonize with the neighboring buildings, was fairly traditional, but the interior was strikingly new. Horta used the technologies of glass and iron, which he had practiced on the Royal Greenhouses of Laeken, to create an interior filled with light and space. The house was built around an open central stairway. The interior decoration featured curling lines, modeled after vines and flowers, which were repeated in the ironwork railings of the stairway, in the tiles of the floor, in the glass of the doors and skylights, and painted on the walls. The building is widely recognized as one of the first appearances of Art Nouveau in architecture (along with the Hankar House by Paul Hankar, built at the same time). In 2000, it was designated, along with three other town houses designed soon afterwards, as a UNESCO World Heritage Site. In designating these sites, UNESCO explained: "The stylistic revolution represented by these works is characterised by their open plan, the diffusion of light, and the brilliant joining of the curved lines of decoration with the structure of the building."

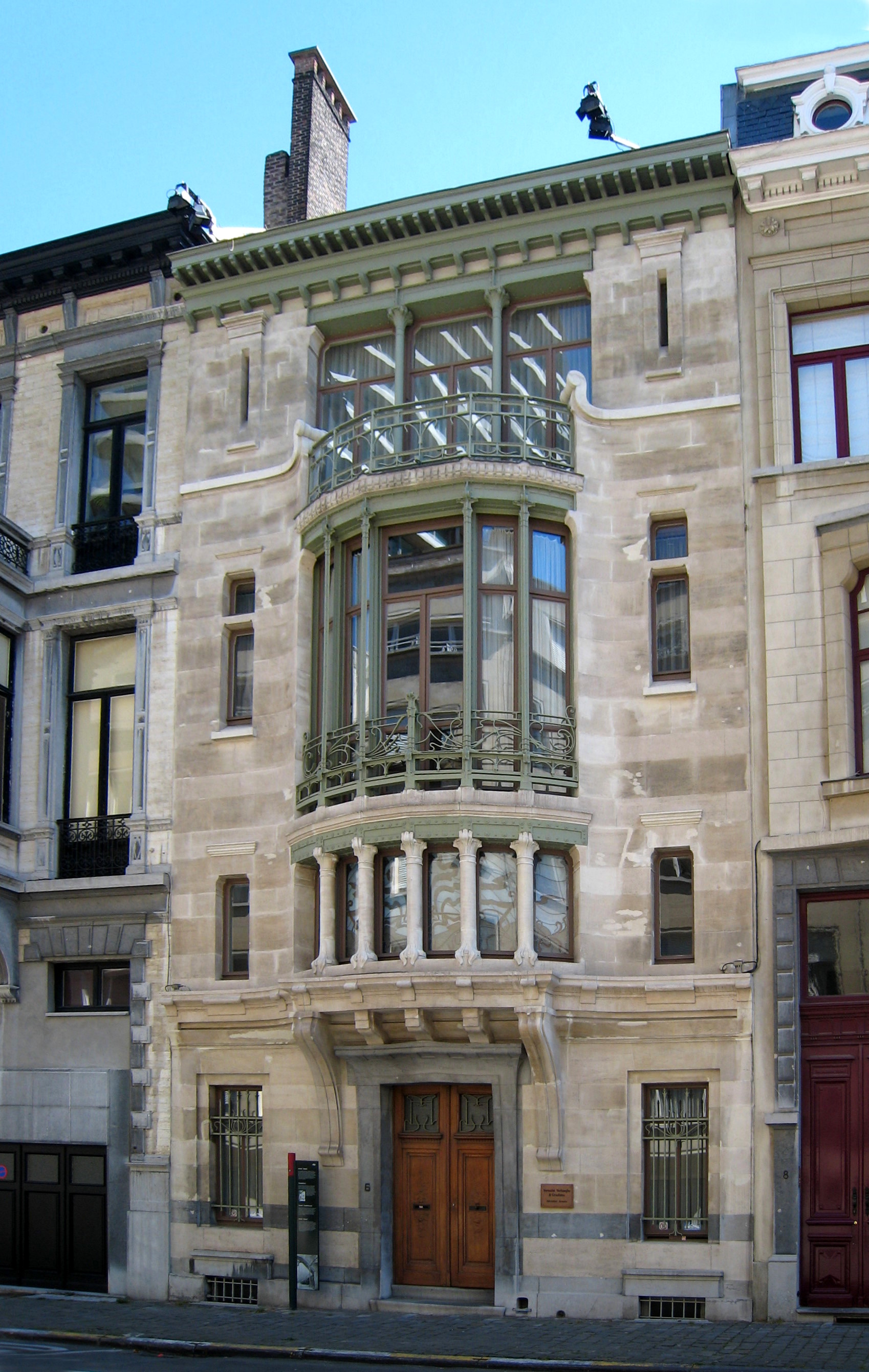
Facade of the Hôtel Tassel, Brussels (1893)

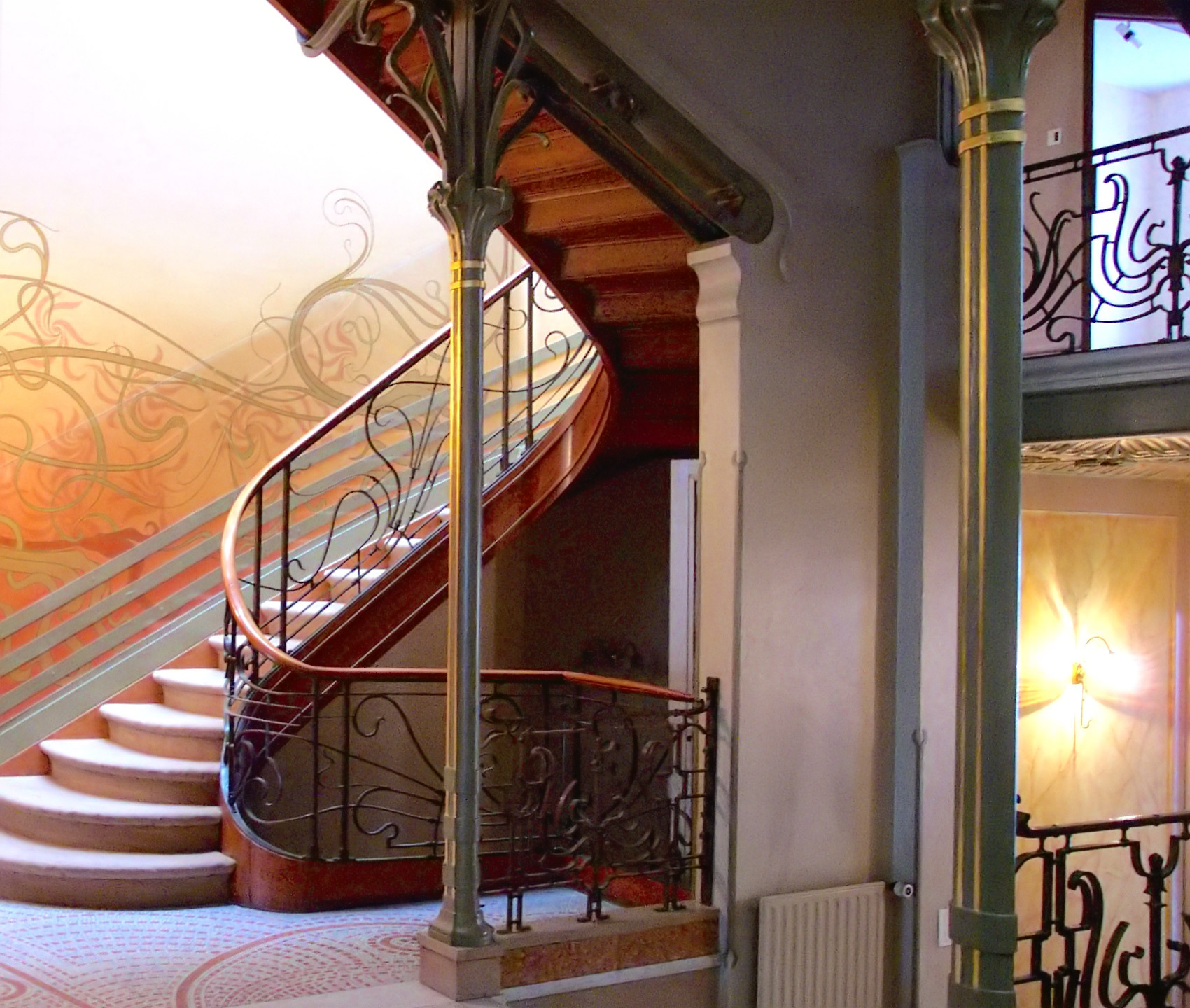
Stairway of the Hôtel Tassel

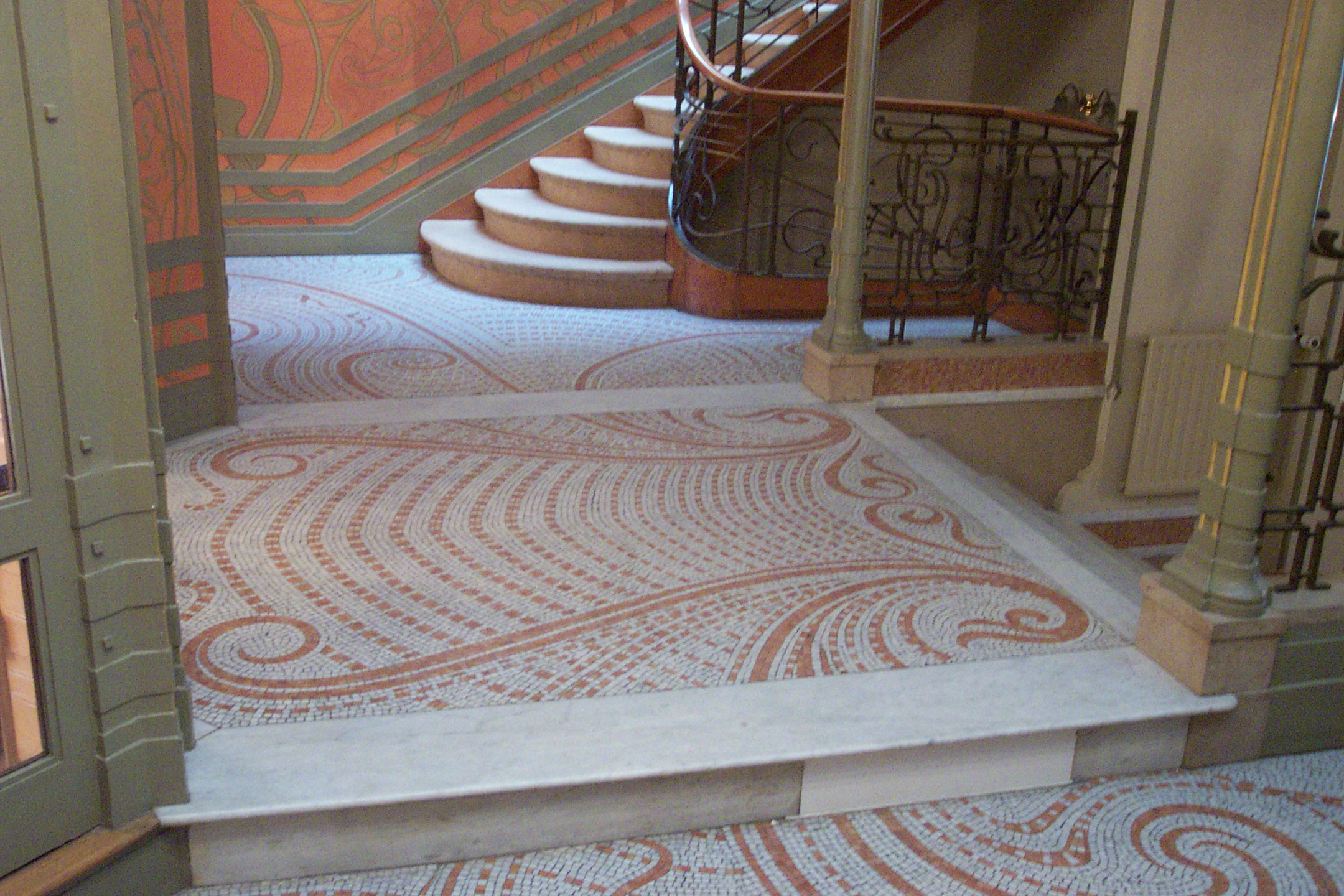
Floor of the Hôtel Tassel, with the characteristic curling vegetal design

=== Hôtel Solvay (1895–1900) ===
The Hôtel Solvay, on the Avenue Louise/Louizalaan in Brussels, was constructed for Armand Solvay, the son of the chemist and industrialist Ernest Solvay. Horta had a virtually unlimited budget, and used the most exotic materials in unusual combinations, such as marble, bronze and rare tropical woods in the stairway decoration. The stairway walls were decorated by the pointillist painter Théo van Rysselberghe. Horta designed every detail including the bronze doorbell and the house number, to match the overall style.

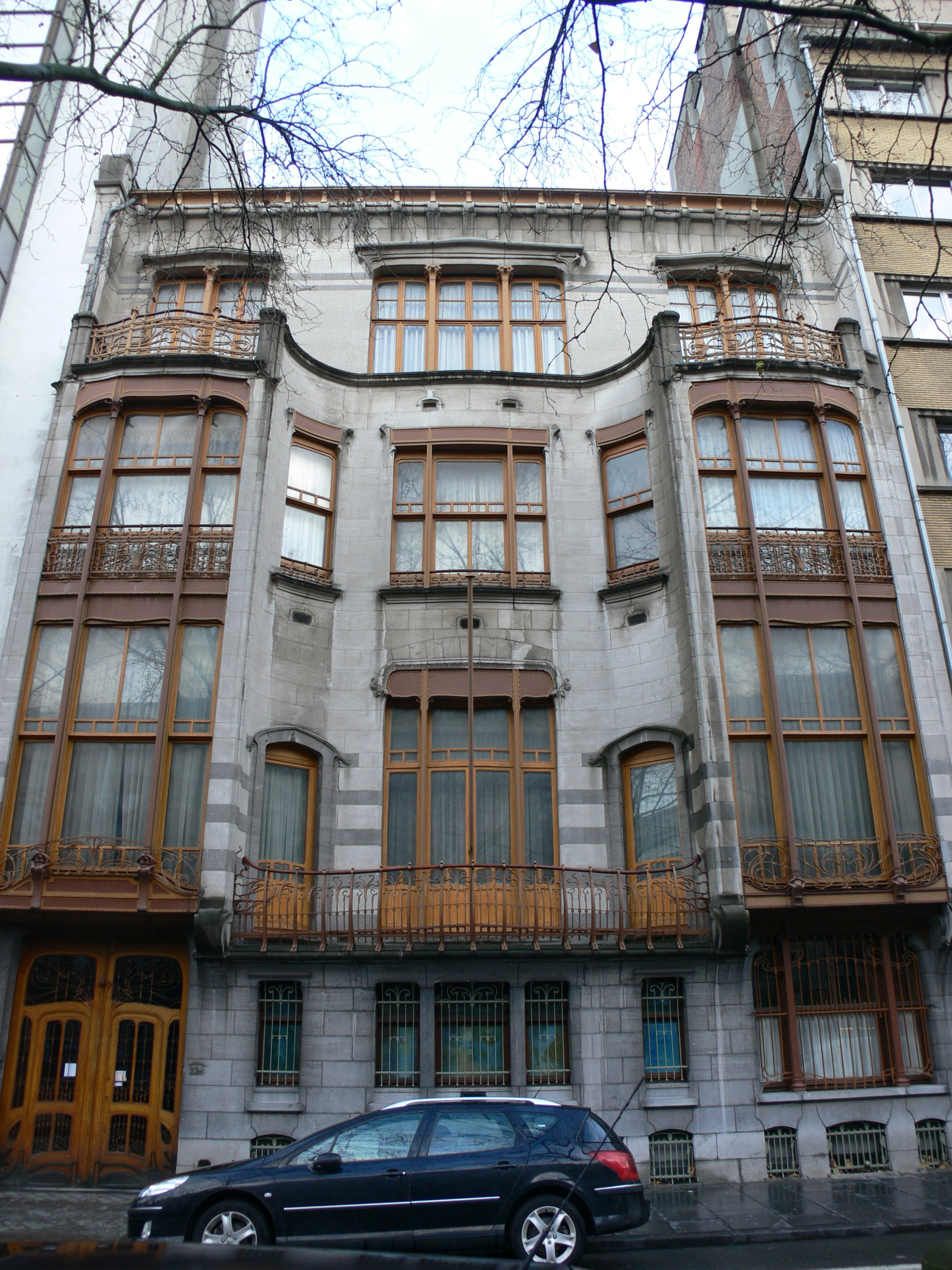
Facade of the Hôtel Solvay, Brussels (1895–1900)

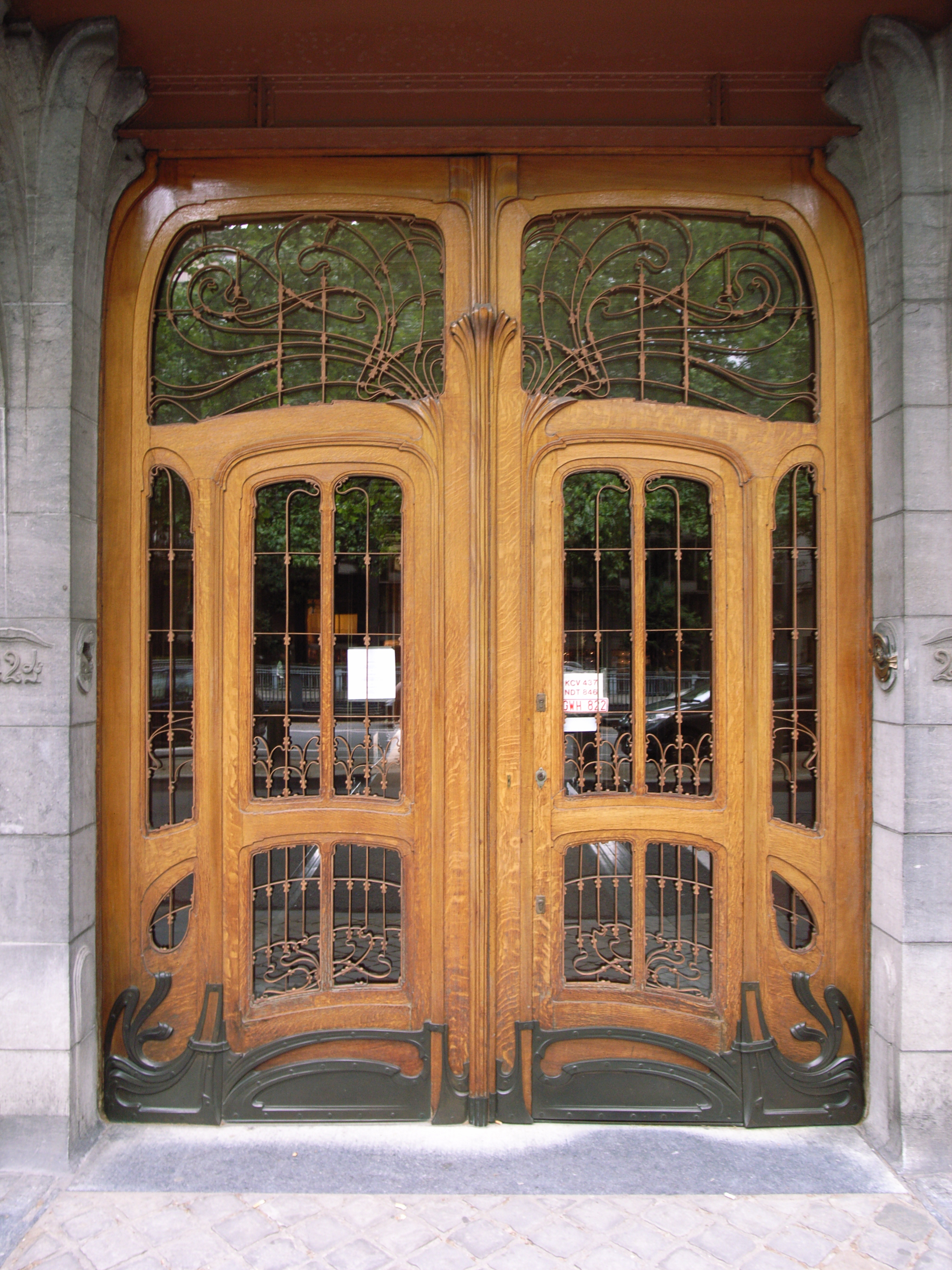
Entrance of the Hôtel Solvay

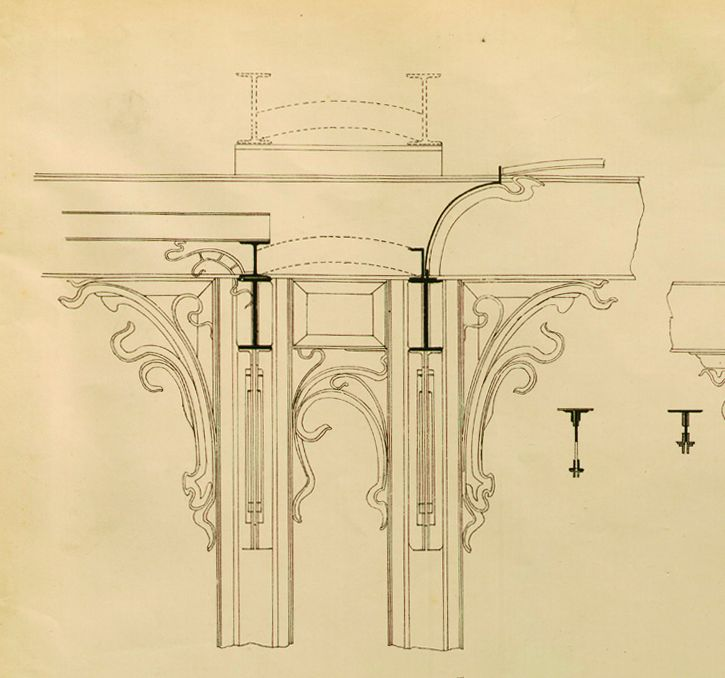
Design of Hôtel Solvay interior decoration by Horta

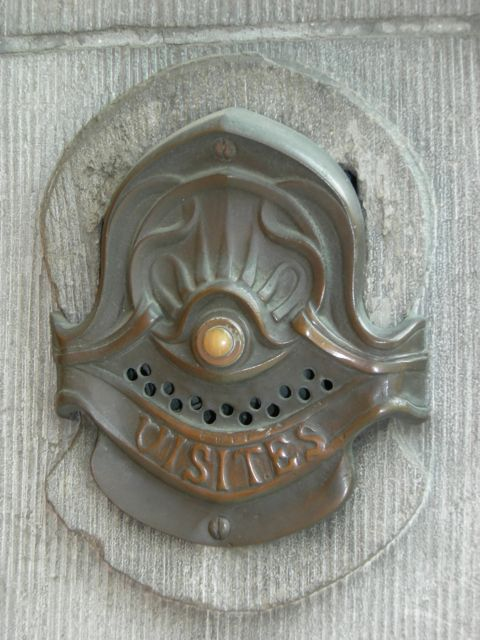
Doorbell of the Hôtel Solvay

=== Hôtel van Eetvelde (1895–1901) ===
The Hôtel van Eetvelde is considered one of Horta's most accomplished and innovative buildings, because of highly original Winter Garden interior and the imaginative details throughout. The open floor plan of the Hôtel Van Eetvelde was particularly original, and offered an abundance of light, both horizontally and vertically, and a great sensation of space. A central court went up the height of the building, bringing light from the skylight above. On the main floor, the oval-shaped salons were open to the courtyard, and also received light from large bay windows. It was possible to look from one side of the building to other from any of the salons on the main floor.

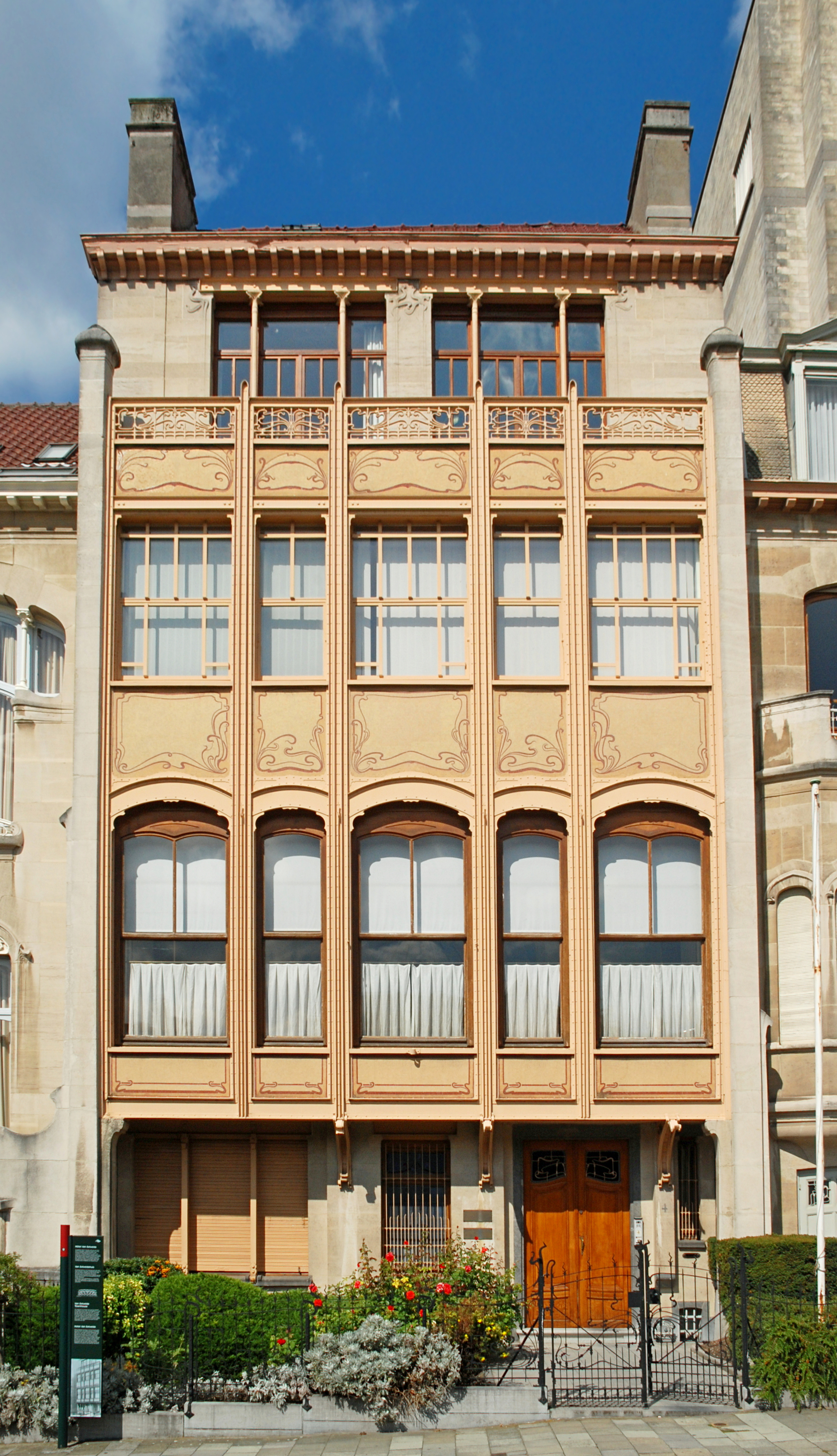
Facade of the Hôtel van Eetvelde, Brussels (1895–1901)

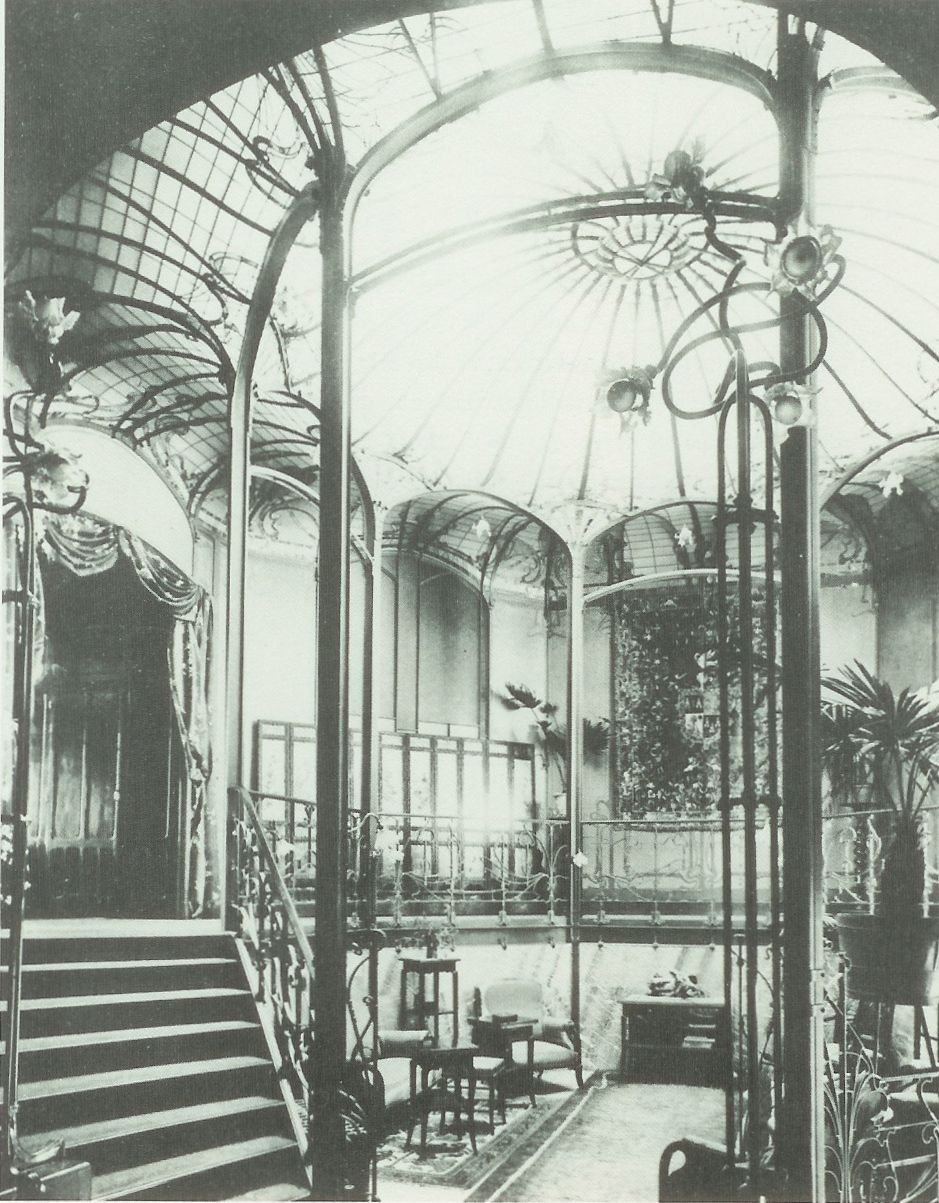
Winter Garden of the Hôtel van Eetvelde

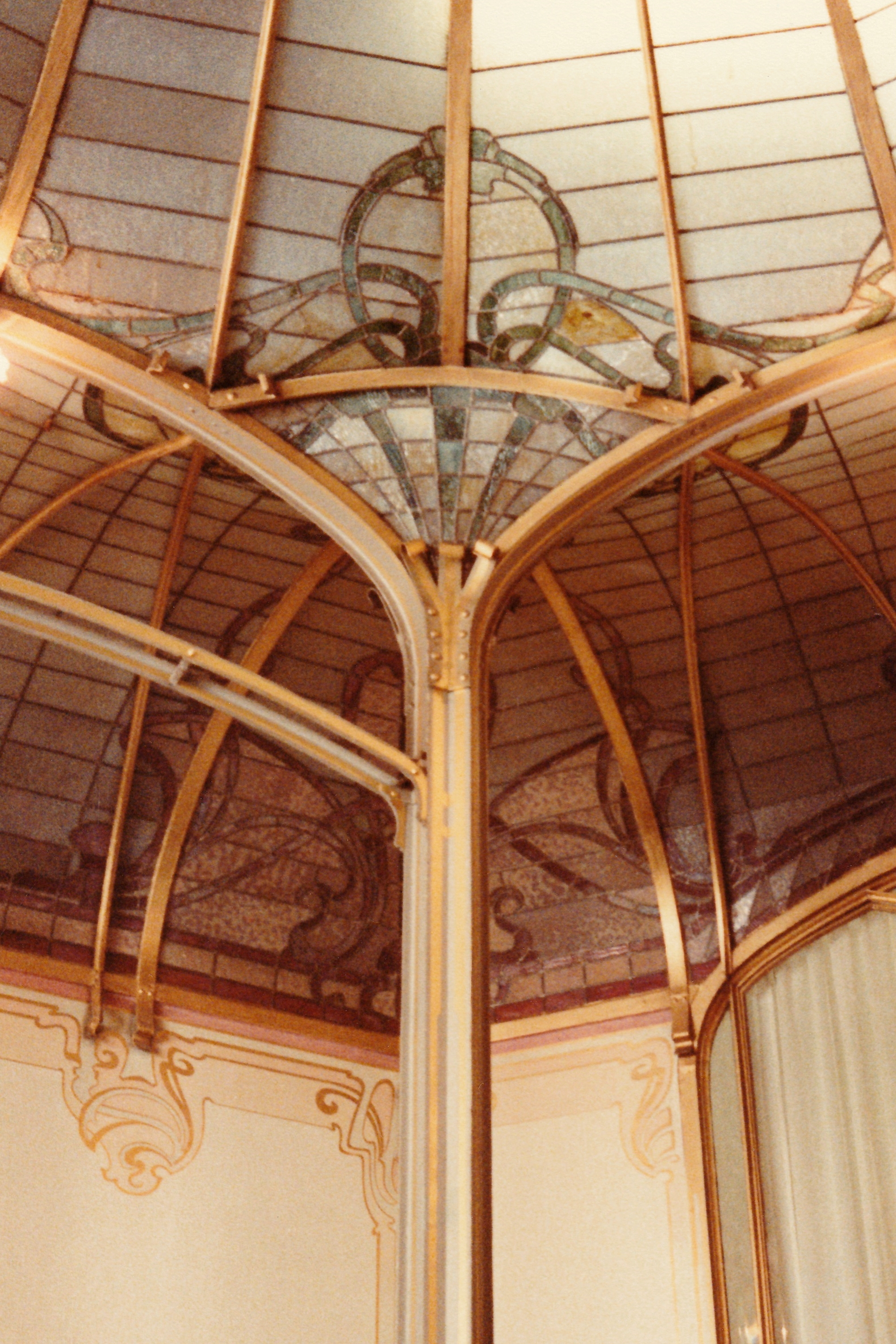
Detail of the Winter Garden of the Hôtel van Eetvelde

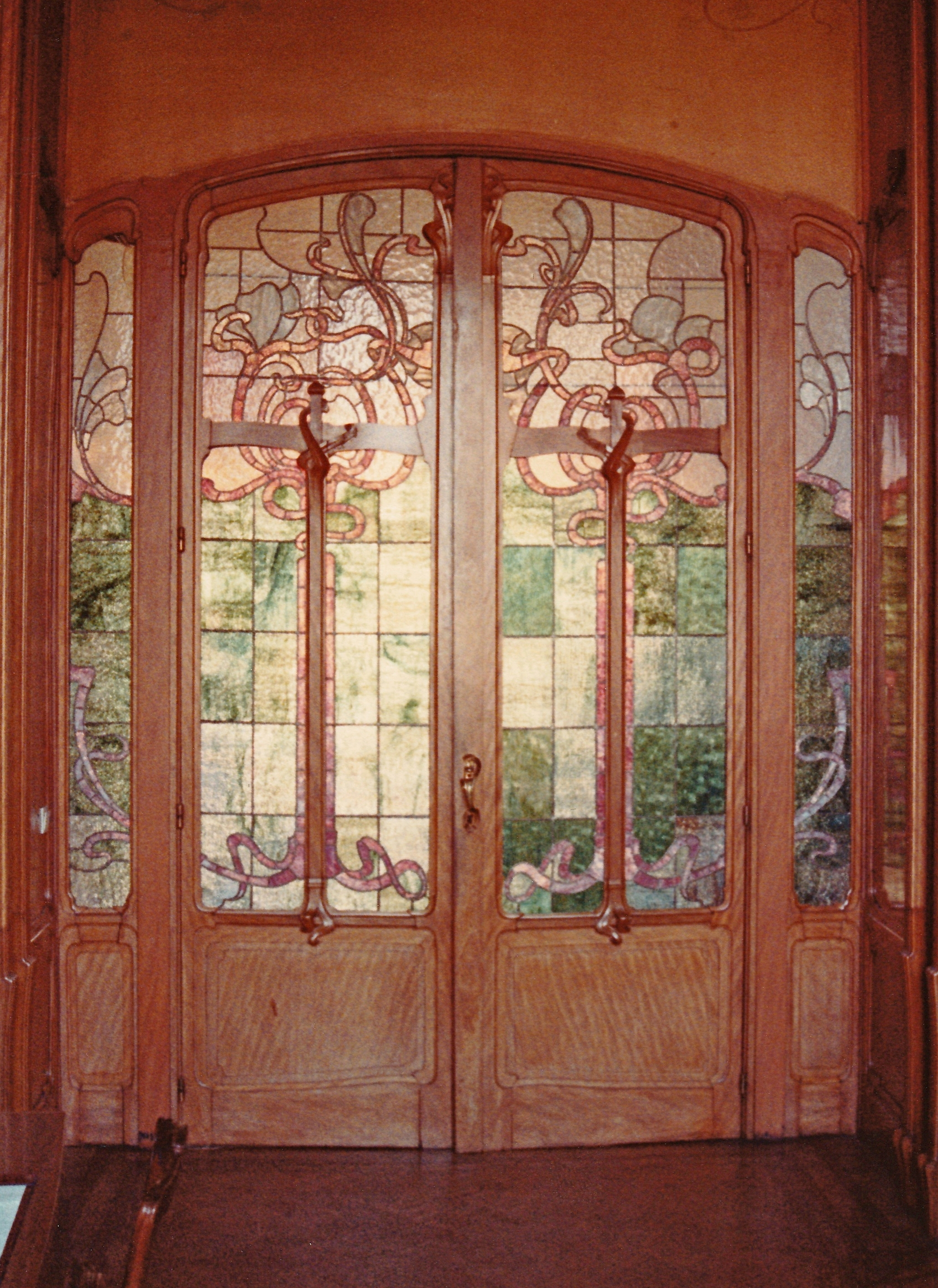
Doorway with stained glass in the Hôtel van Eetvelde

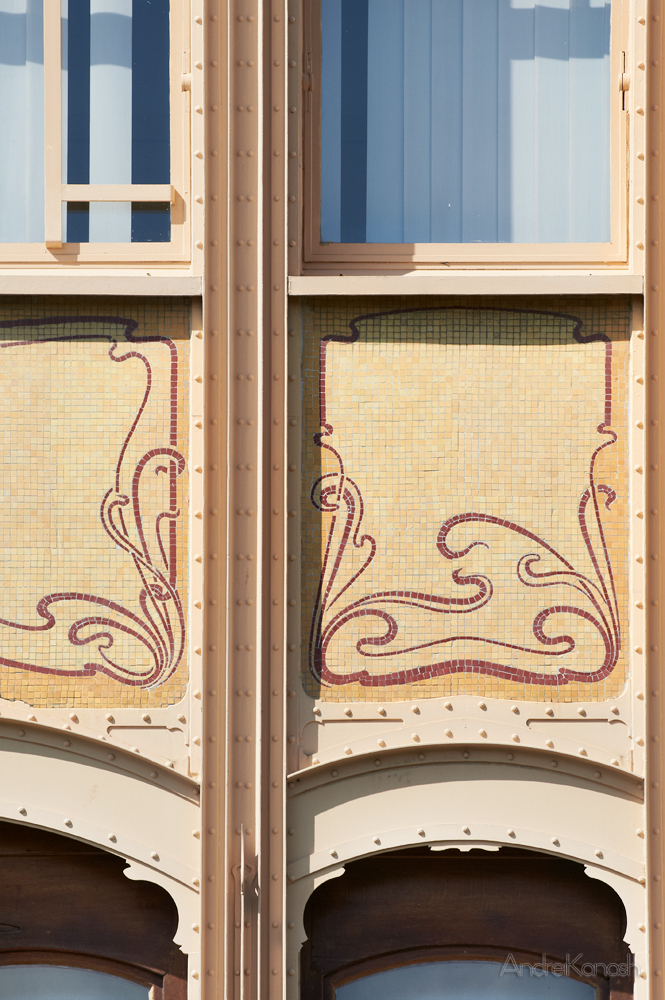
Detail of the facade of the Hôtel van Eetvelde

=== Horta House and Studio (1898–1901) ===
The Horta House and Studio, now the Horta Museum, was Horta's residence and office, and was certainly more modest than the other houses, but it had its own original features and equally fine craftsmanship and mastery of details. He made unusual combinations of materials, such as wood, iron and marble in the staircase decoration.

The novel element in Horta's houses and then his larger buildings was his search for maximum transparency and light, something often difficult to achieve with the narrow building sites in Brussels. He achieved this by use of large windows, skylights, mirrors, and especially by his open floor plans, which brought in light from all sides and from above.

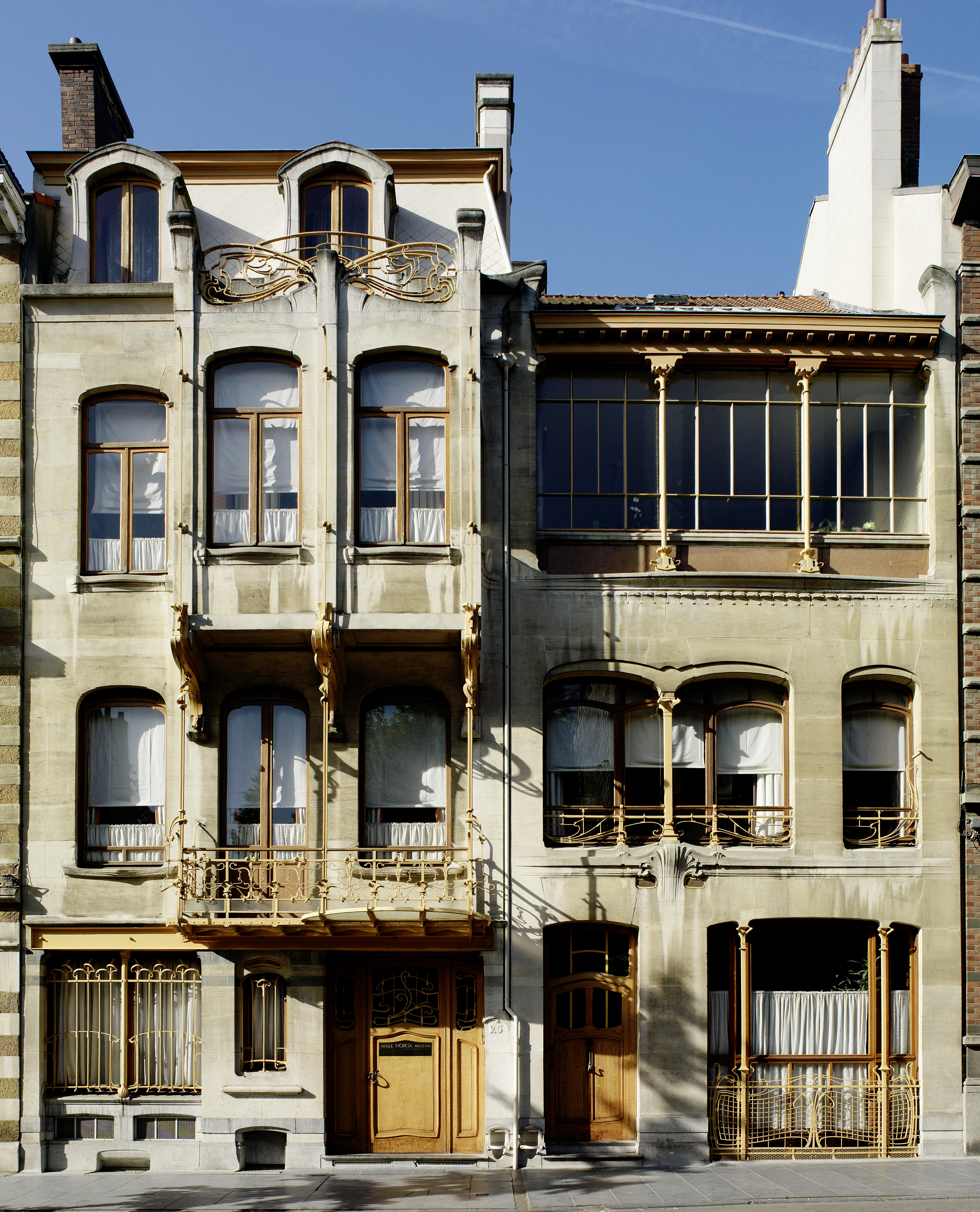
The Horta Museum, Brussels (1898–1901), composed of Horta's residence and workshop side-by-side

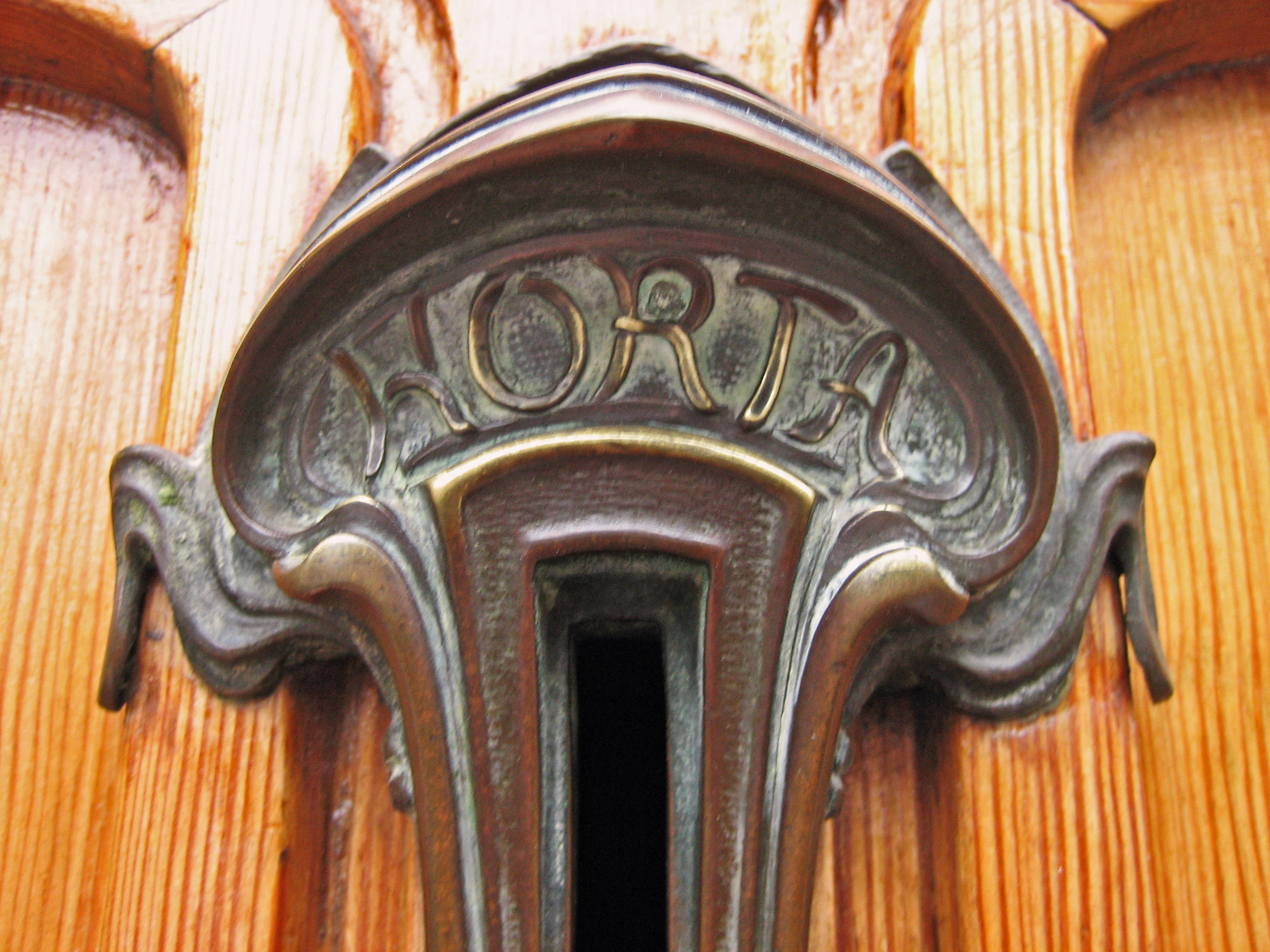
Detail of the door of the Horta Museum

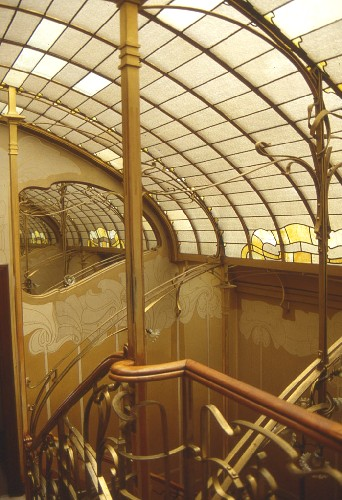
Stairway and skylight and stairway of the Horta Museum

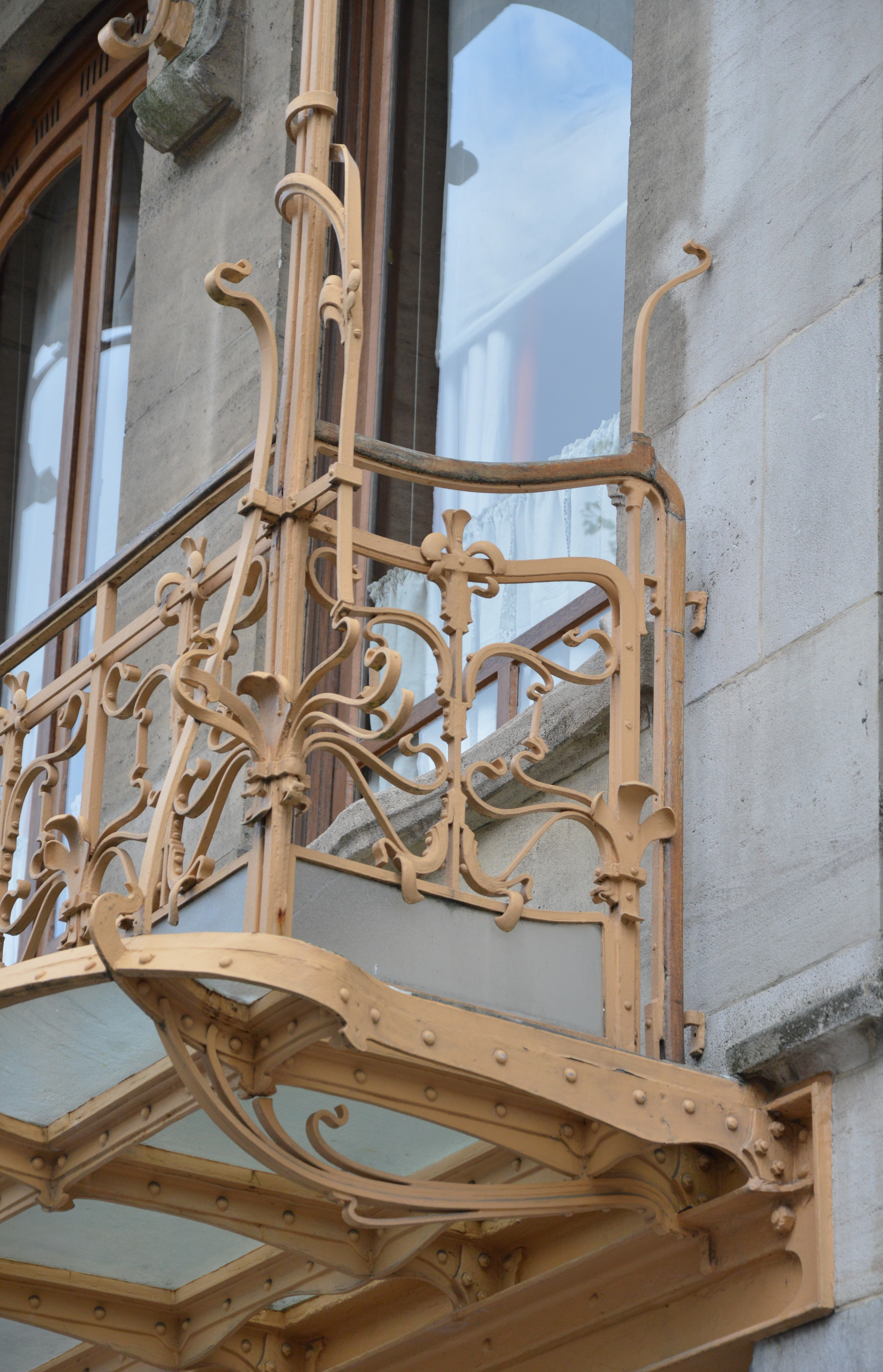
Balcony of the Horta Museum

=== Hôtel Aubecq (1899–1902) ===
The Hôtel Aubecq in Brussels was one of his late houses, made for the industrialist Octave Aubecq. As with his other houses, it featured a skylight over the central staircase, filling the house with light. Its peculiarity was the octagonal shape of the rooms, and the three facades with windows, designed to give maximum light. The owner originally wished to keep his original family furniture, but because of the odd shape of the rooms, Horta was commissioned to create new furniture.

By the mid-1930s, Art Nouveau was out of fashion, and modernist architects argued that the old Art Nouveau mansions should be replaced by tall apartment buildings. In 1936, critic Pierre Gilles took aim at the Hôtel Aubecq: "A pampered building that unrepentantly recalls those airy-fairy years." The creation of "an aesthete-architect", its "drooping floral lines" resembled faded coastal casinos and the work of humorous illustrator Albert Robida, he wrote. By 1948, the house was sold to a new owner, who wished to demolish it. A movement began to preserve the house, but in the end only the facade and the furnishings were saved by the City of Brussels. The facade was disassembled and put into storage, and many proposals were made for its reconstruction, but none were carried out. Some of the furnishings are now on display at the Musée d'Orsay in Paris.

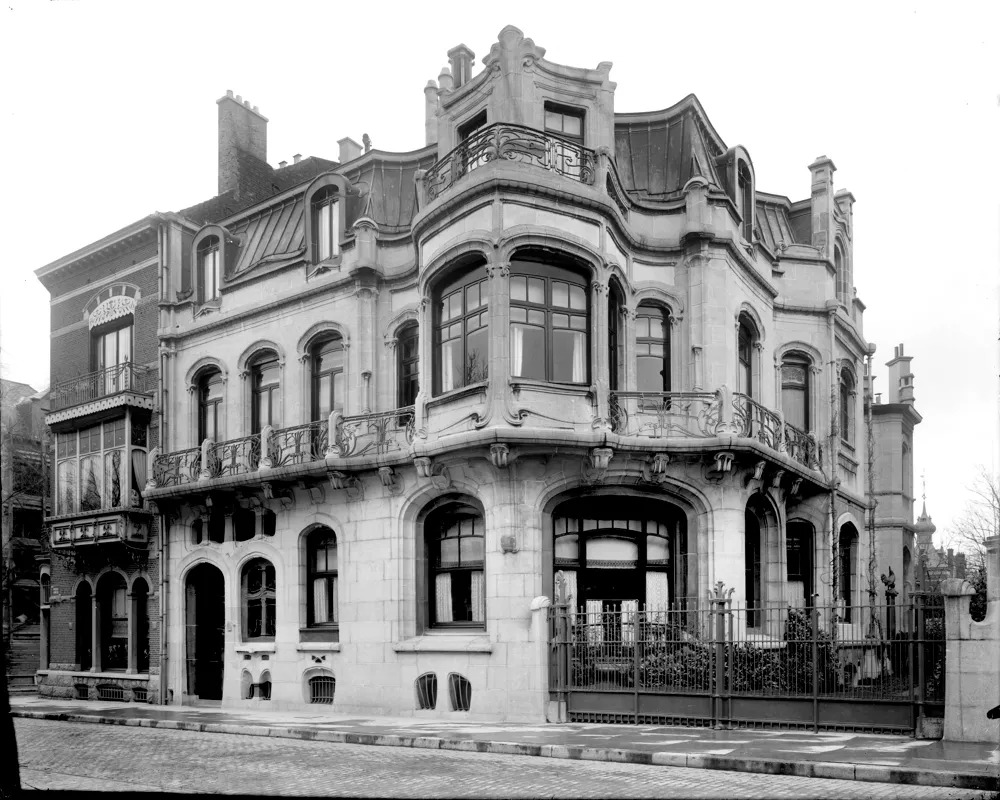
Facade of the Hôtel Aubecq, Brussels (1899–1902)

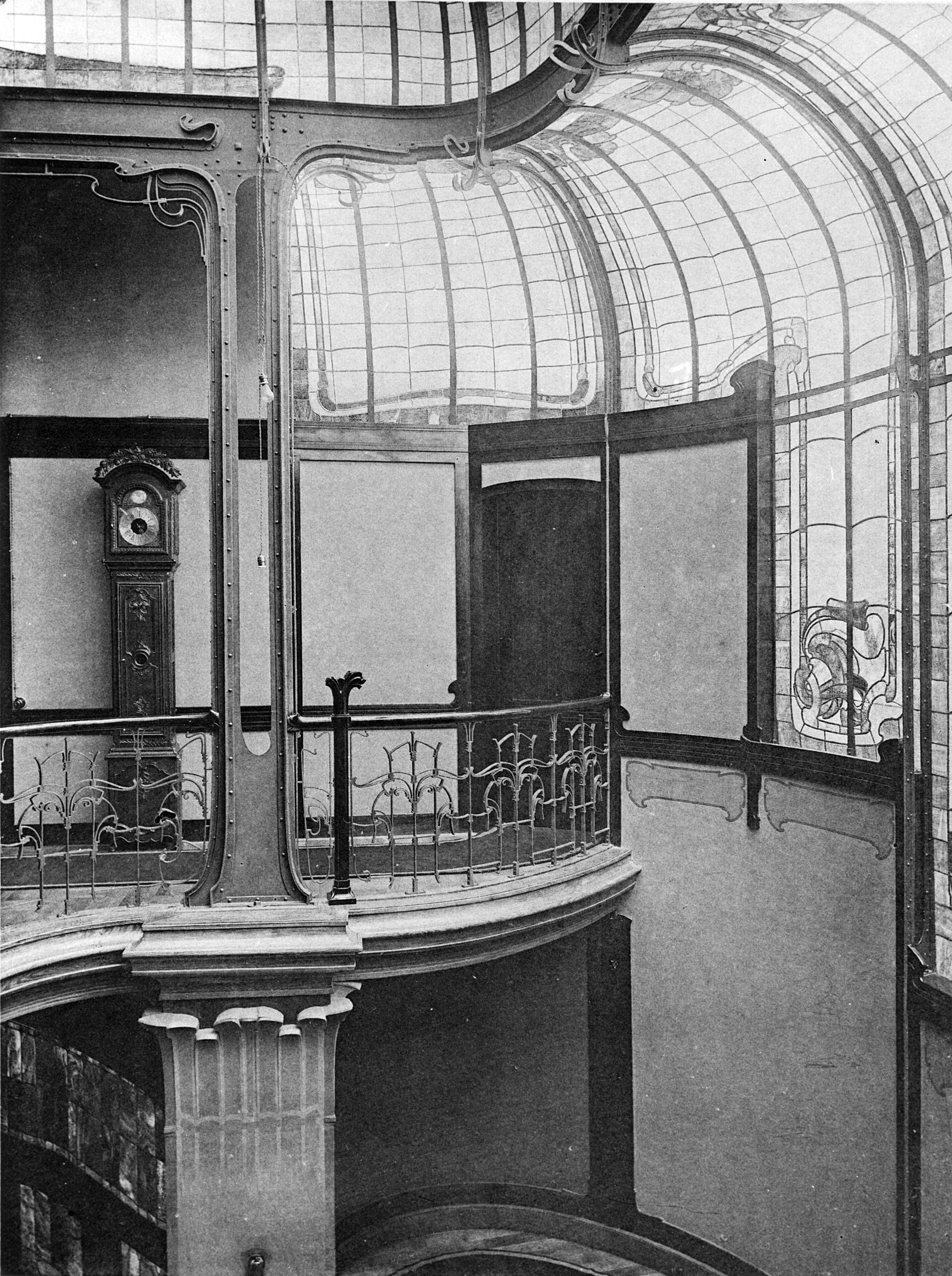
Upper part of the hall in the Hôtel Aubecq

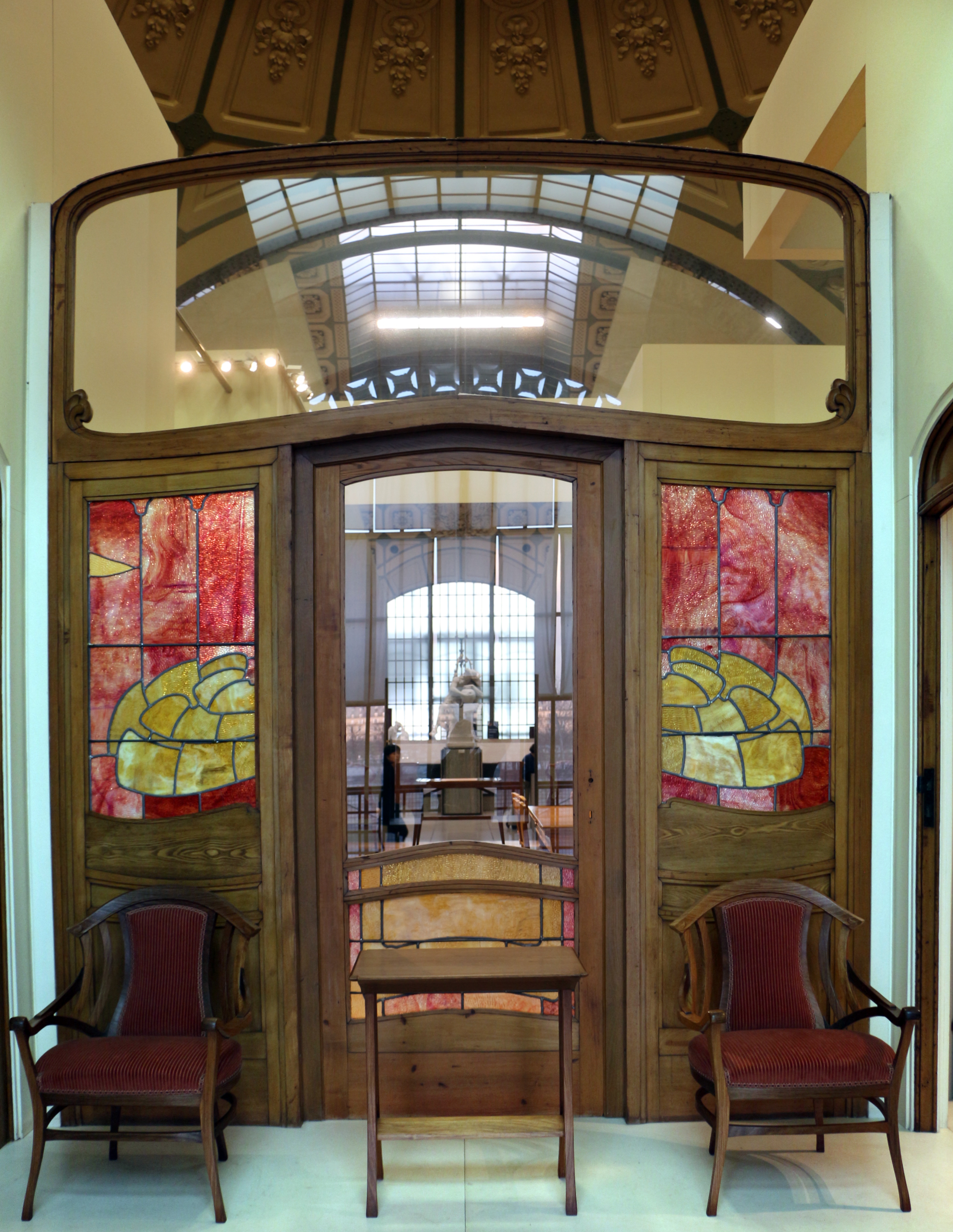
Furnishings of the Hôtel Aubecq on display at the Musée d'Orsay, Paris

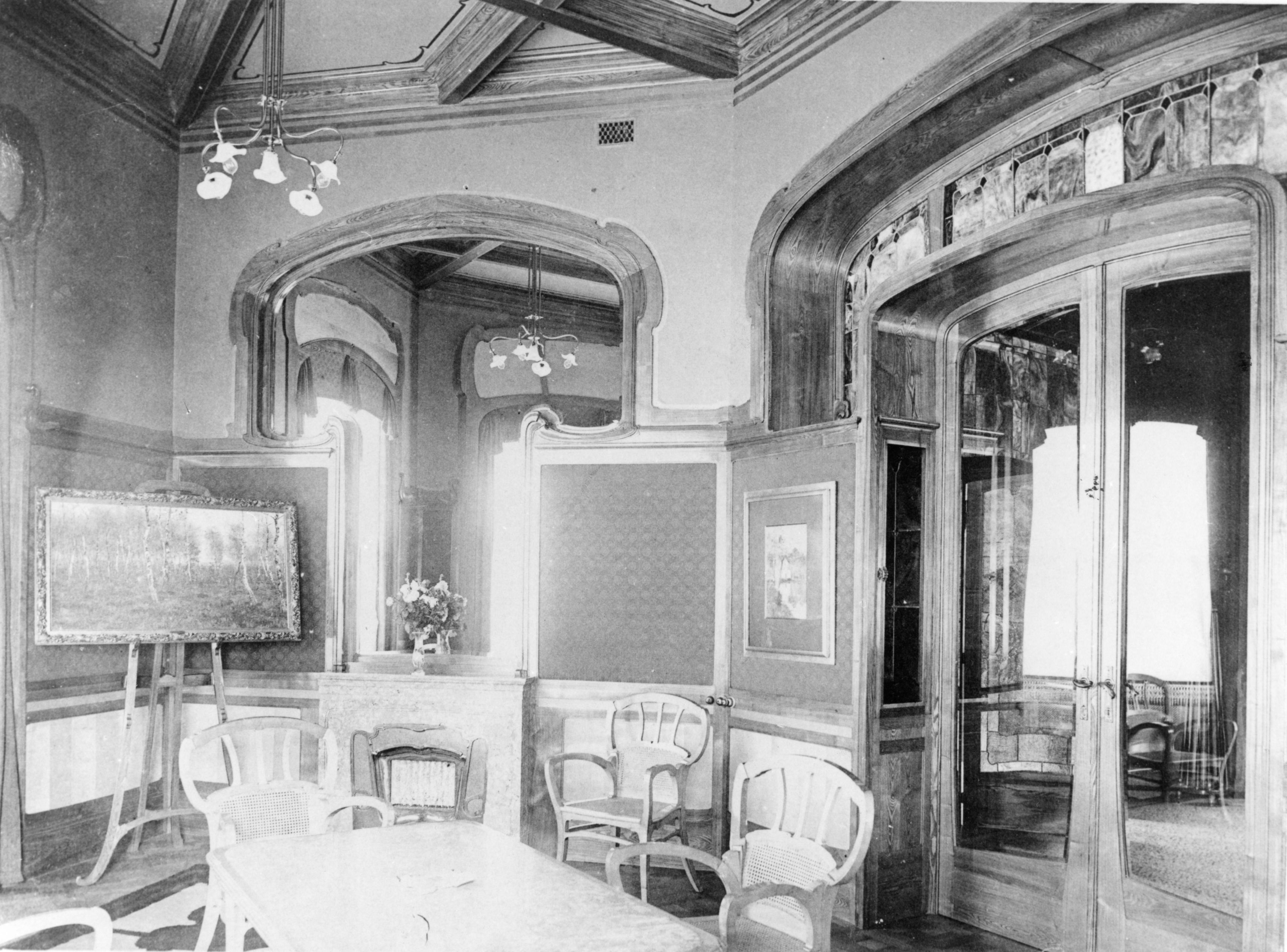
Salon of the Hôtel Aubecq

=== Maison du Peuple (1896–1899) ===
While Horta was building luxurious town houses for the wealthy, he also applied his ideas to more functional buildings. From 1896 to 1899, he designed and built the Maison du Peuple/Volkshuis ("House of the People"), the headquarters for the Belgian Workers' Party (POB/BWP). This was a large structure including offices, meeting rooms, a café and a conference and concert hall seating over 2,000 people. It was a purely functional building, constructed of steel columns with curtain walls. Unlike his houses, there was virtually no decoration. The only recognizable Art Nouveau feature was a slight curving of the steel pillars supporting the roof. As with his houses, the building was designed to make a maximum use of light, with large skylights over the main meeting room. It was demolished in 1965, despite an international petition of protest by over 700 architects. The materials of the building were saved for possible reconstruction, but were eventually scattered around Brussels. Some parts were used for the construction of the Brussels Metro system.

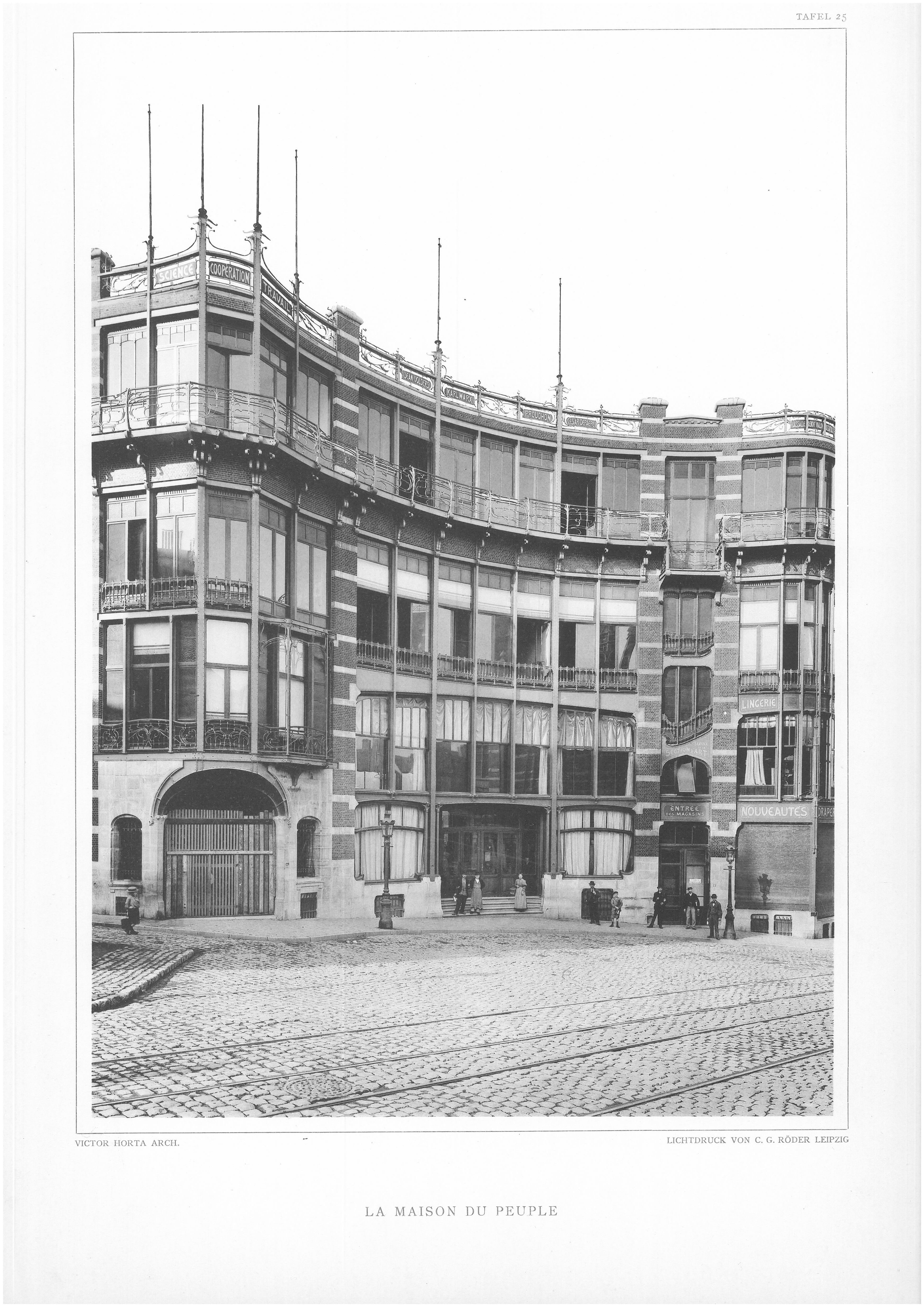
Facade of the Maison du Peuple, Brussels (1896–1899)

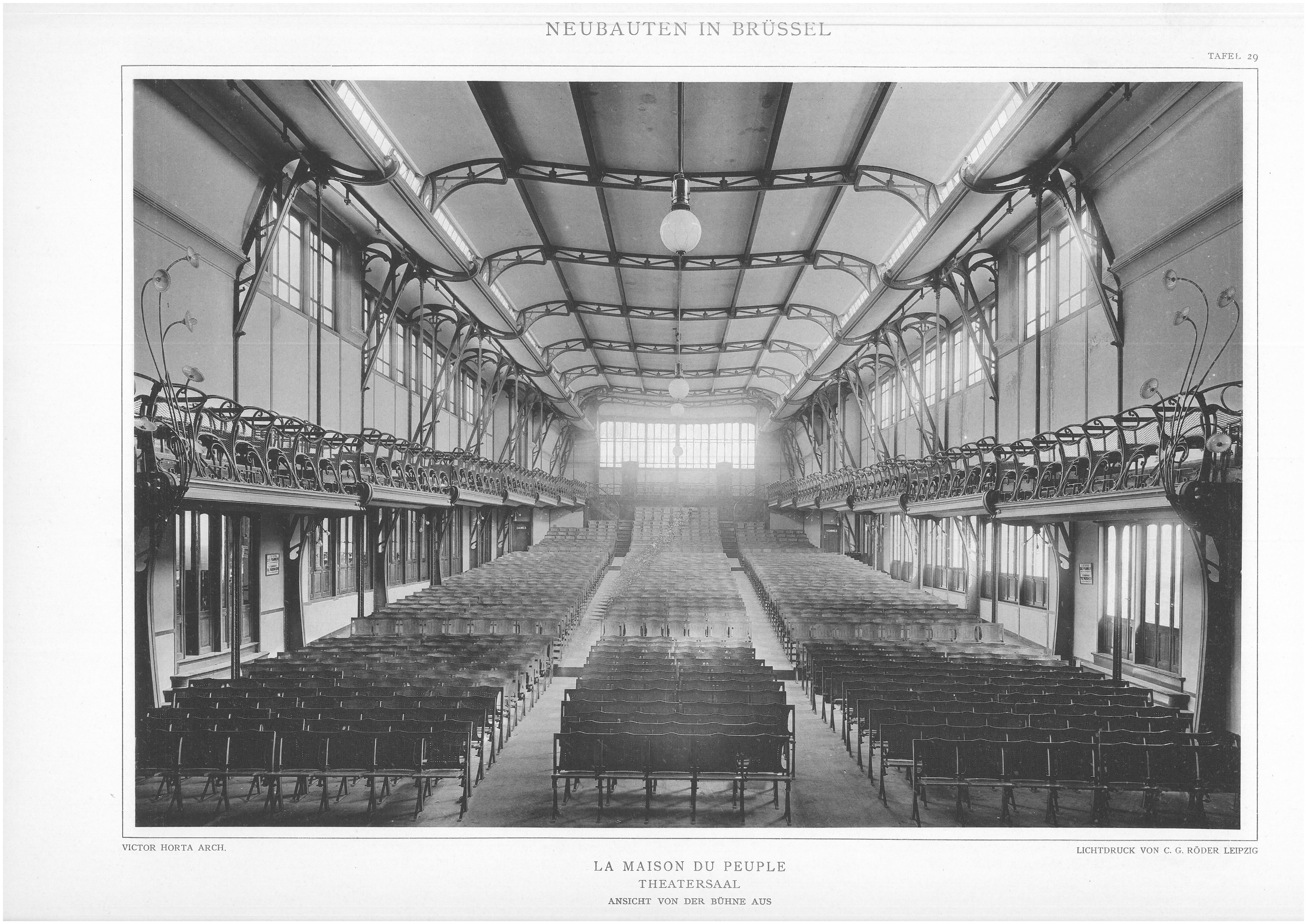
Theatre and Meeting Hall of the Maison du Peuple

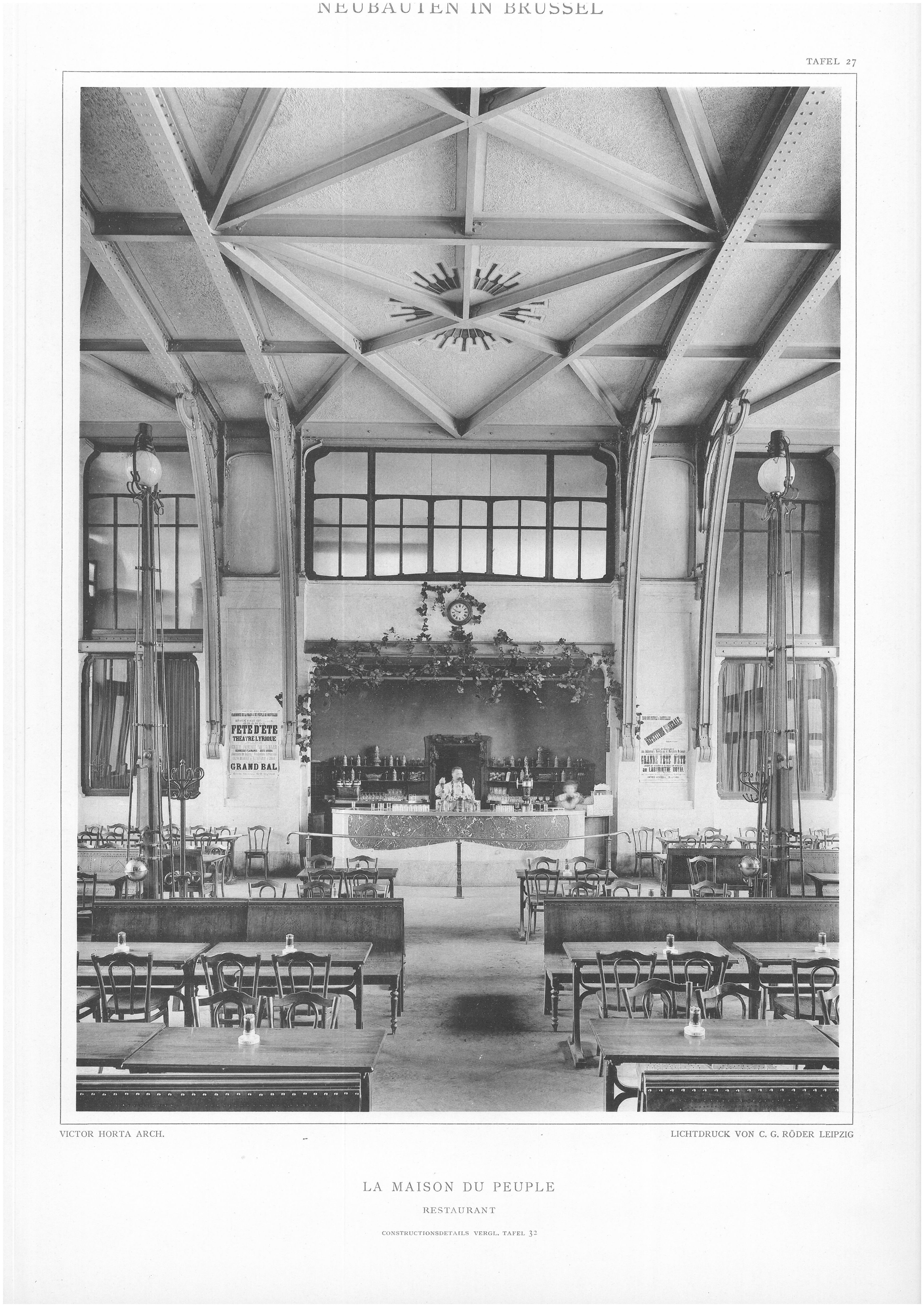
Restaurant of the Maison du Peuple

Beginning in about 1900, Horta's buildings gradually became more simplified in form, but always made with great attention to functionality and to craftsmanship. Beginning in 1903, he constructed the Grand Bazar Anspach, a large department store, with his characteristic use of large windows, open floors, and wrought iron decoration. In 1907, Horta designed the Museum for Fine Arts in Tournai, although it did not open until 1928 due to World War I.

=== Magasins Waucquez (1905–06) ===
The Magasins Waucquez (now the Belgian Comic Strip Center) was originally a department store specializing in textiles. In its design, Horta used all his skill with steel and glass to create dramatic open spaces and to give them an abundance of light from above. The steel and glass skylight is combined with decorative touches, such as neoclassical columns. After Waucquez's death in 1920, the building began to languish away, and in 1970, the firm closed its doors. Jean Delhaye, a former student and aide of Horta, saved the building from demolition, and by 16 October 1975, because of its connection to Horta, it was declared a protected monument. Now a museum of a particular Belgian speciality, the comic strip, it also has a room devoted to Horta.

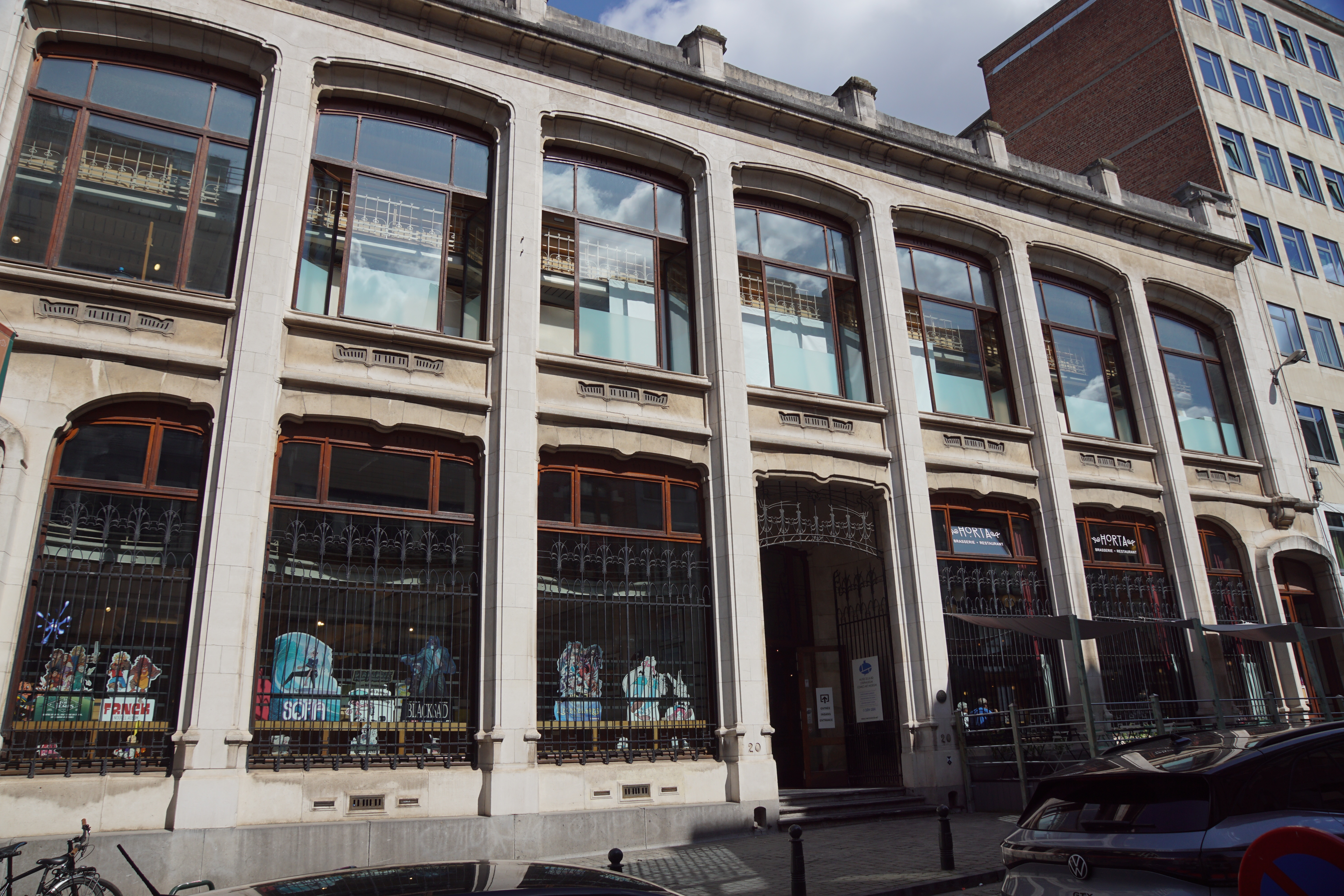
Facade of the former Magasins Waucquez, now the Belgian Comic Strip Center, Brussels (1905)

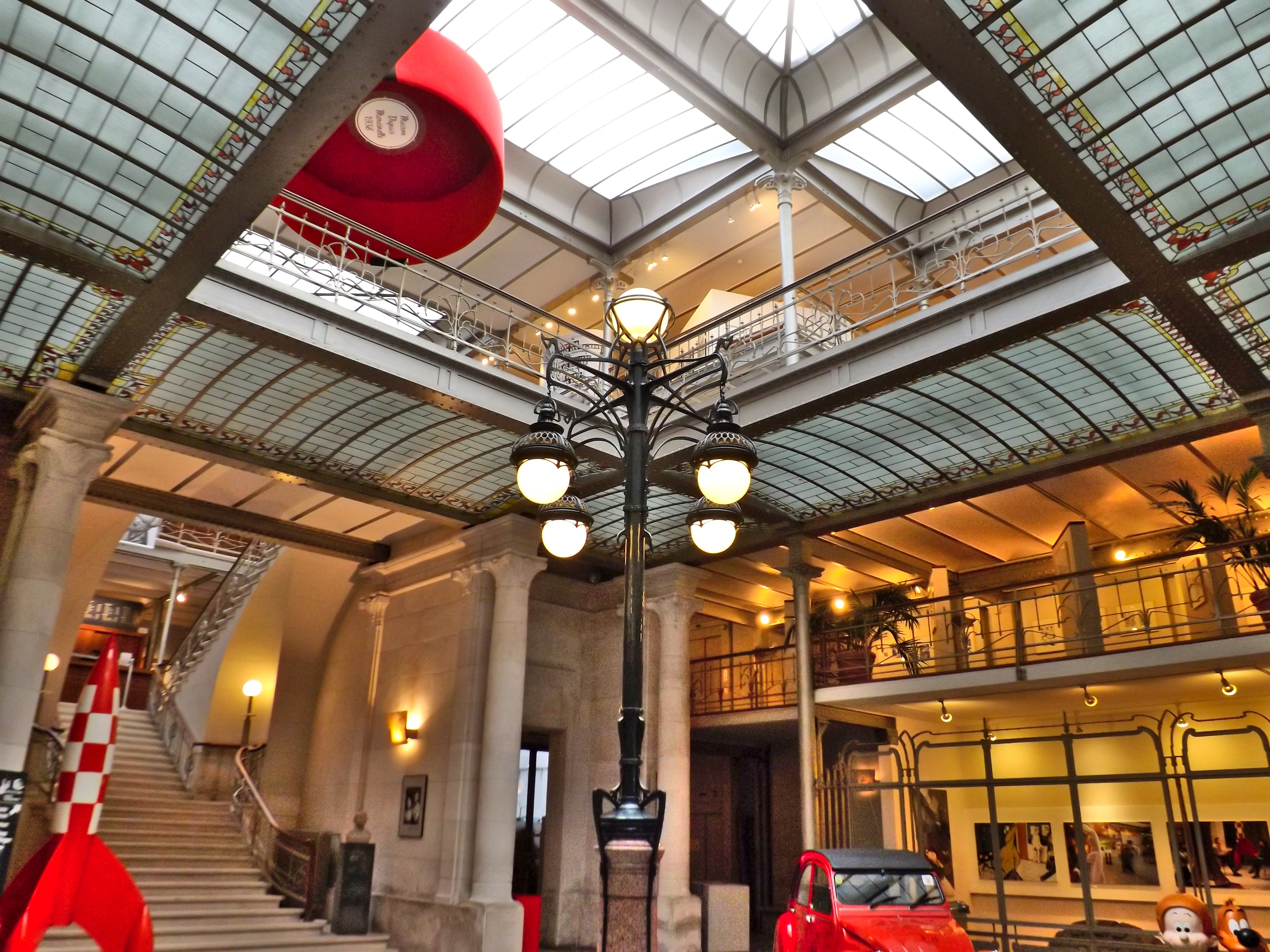
Entrance hall of the former Magasins Waucquez, now the Belgian Comic Strip Center

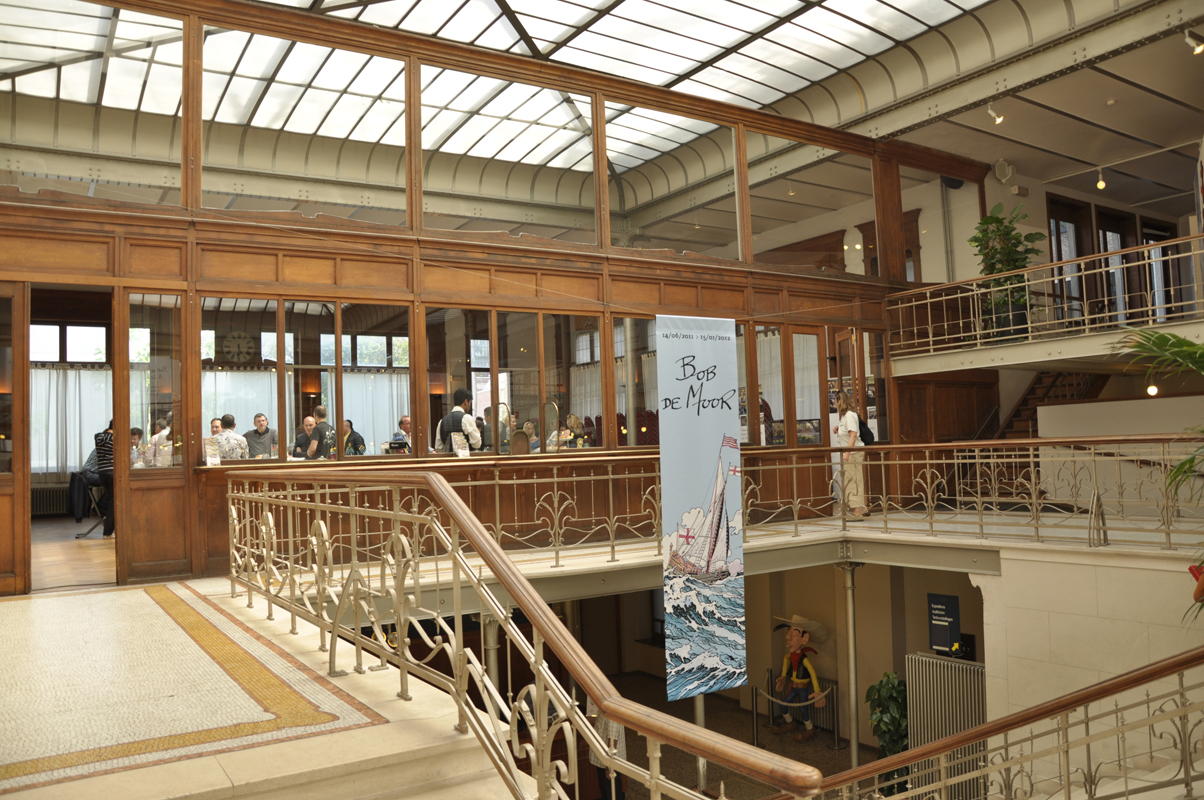
Upper floor of the Belgian Comic Strip Center

=== Brugmann University Hospital (1906) ===
In 1906, Horta accepted the commission for the new Brugmann University Hospital (now the Victor Horta Site of the Brugmann University Hospital). Developed to take into account the views of the clinicians and hospital managers, Horta's design separated the functions of the hospital into a number of low-rise pavilions spread over the 18 hectares (44 acres) park based campus, and work began in 1911. Although used during World War I, the official opening was delayed until 1923. Its unusual design and layout attracted great interest from the European medical community, and his buildings continue in use to this day.

== The First World War – travel to the United States ==
In February 1915, as World War I was underway and Belgium was occupied, Horta moved to London and attended the Town Planning Conference on the Reconstruction of Belgium, organised by the International Garden Cities and Town Planning Association. Unable to return to Belgium, at the end of 1915, he traveled to the United States, where he gave a series of lectures at American universities, including Cornell, Harvard, MIT, Smith College, Wellesley College and Yale. In 1917, he was named Charles Eliot Norton Memorial Lecturer and Professor of Architecture at George Washington University.

== Later Projects – debut of modernism (1919–1939) ==
On Horta's return to Brussels in January 1919, he sold his home and workshop on the Rue Américaine/Amerikaansestraat, and also became a full member of the Belgian Royal Academy. The post-war austerity meant that Art Nouveau was no longer affordable or fashionable. From this point on, Horta, who had gradually been simplifying his style over the previous decade, no longer used organic forms, and instead based his designs on the geometrical. He continued to use rational floor plans, and to apply the latest developments in building technology and building services engineering. The Centre for Fine Arts in Brussels, a multi-purpose cultural centre designed in a more geometric style similar to Art Deco.

=== Centre for Fine Arts (1923–1929) ===
Horta developed the plans for the Centre for Fine Arts beginning in 1919, with construction starting in 1923. It was completed in 1929. It was originally intended to be built of stone, but Horta made a new plan of reinforced concrete with a steel frame. He had intended the concrete to be left exposed in the interior, but the final appearance did not meet his expectations, and he had it covered. The concert hall itself is in an unusual ovoid, or egg shape, and is accompanied by art galleries, meeting rooms, and other functional rooms. The building is placed on a complex hillside site, and occupies eight levels, much of it underground. It also had to be designed to avoid blocking the view from the Royal Palace, on the hill just above it.

In 1927, Horta became the Director of the Royal Academy of Fine Arts in Brussels, a post he held for four years until 1931. In recognition of his work, Horta was awarded the title of Baron by King Albert I in 1932.

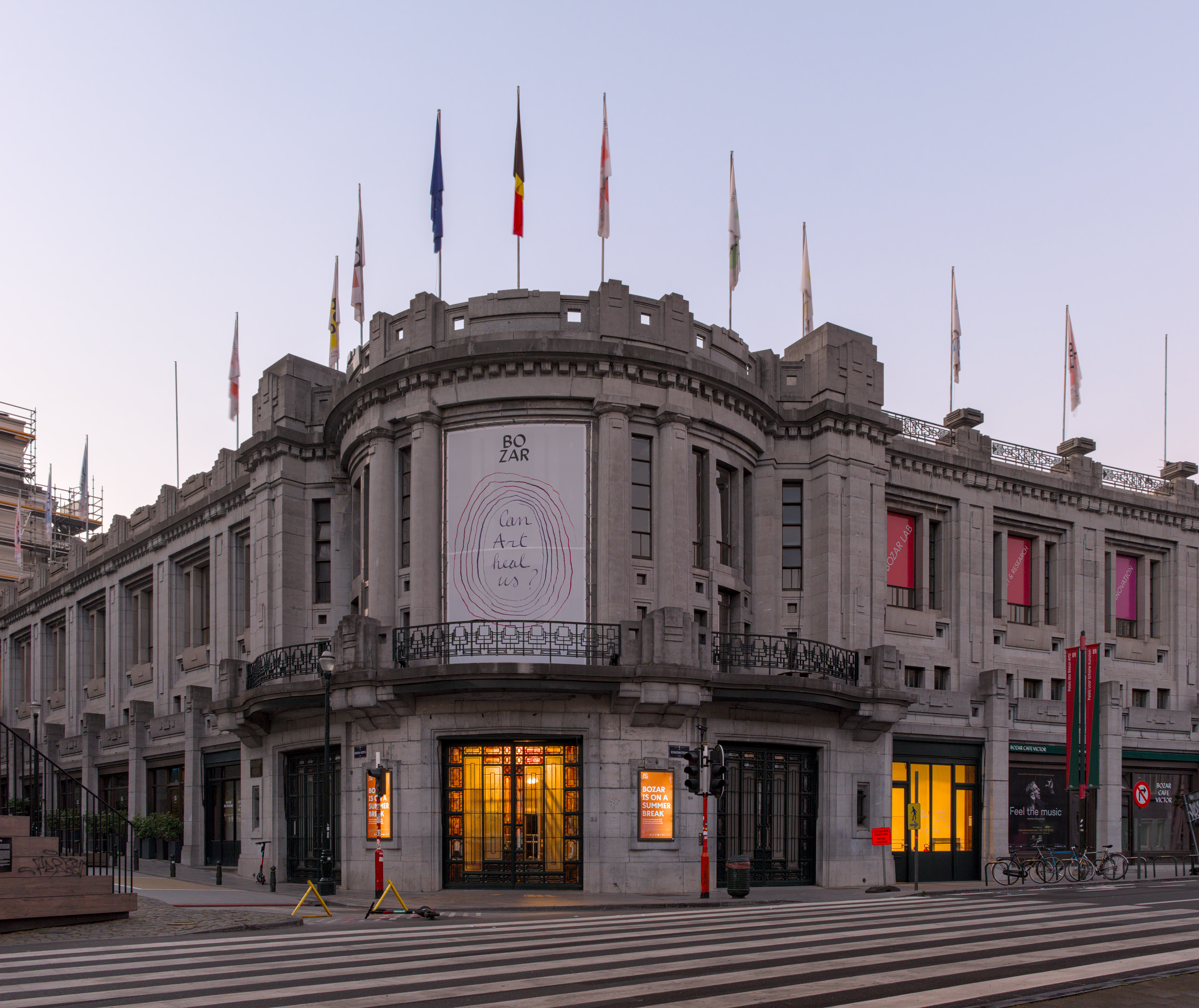
Centre for Fine Arts, Brussels (1923–1929)

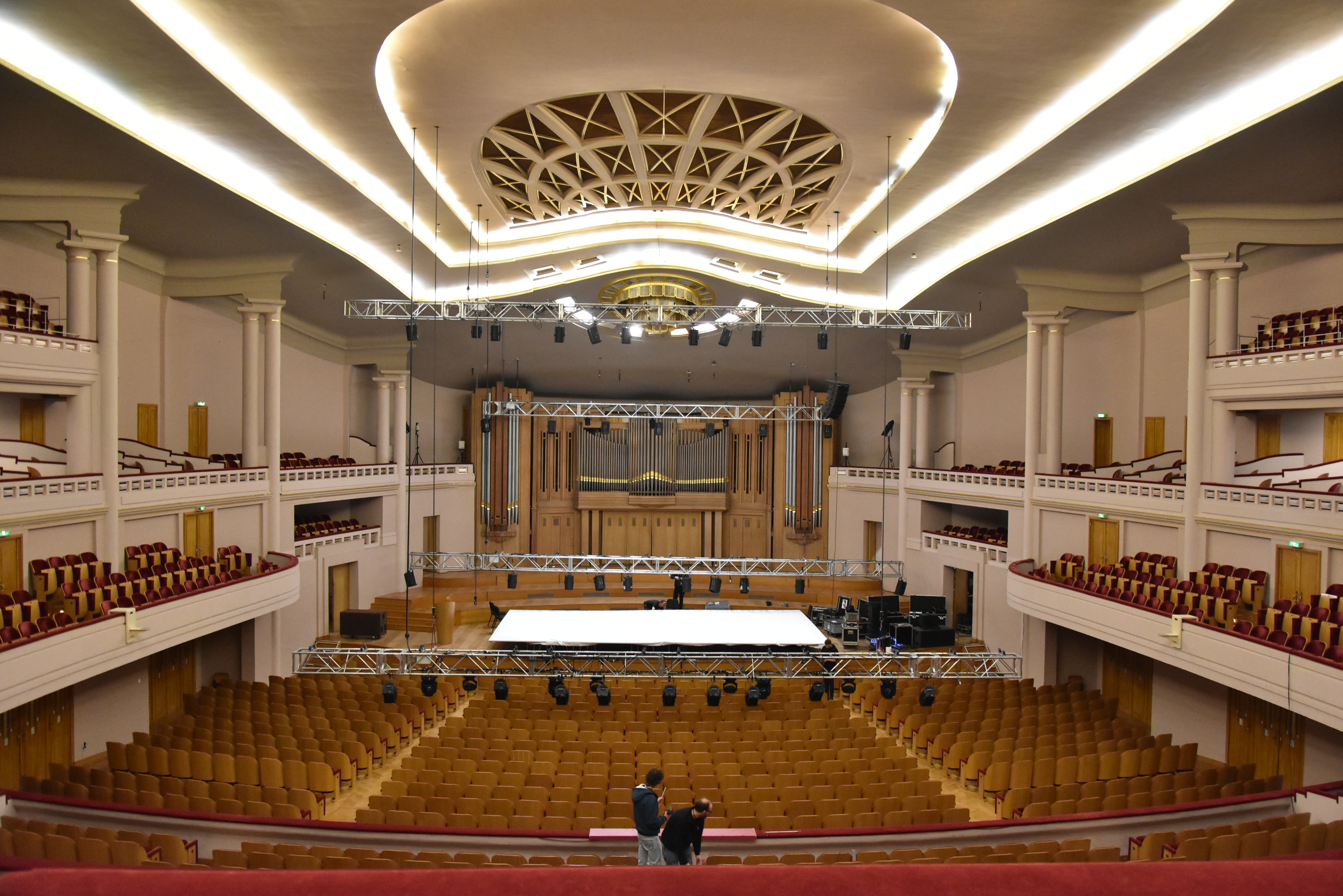
Henry Le Bœuf Hall at the Centre for Fine Arts

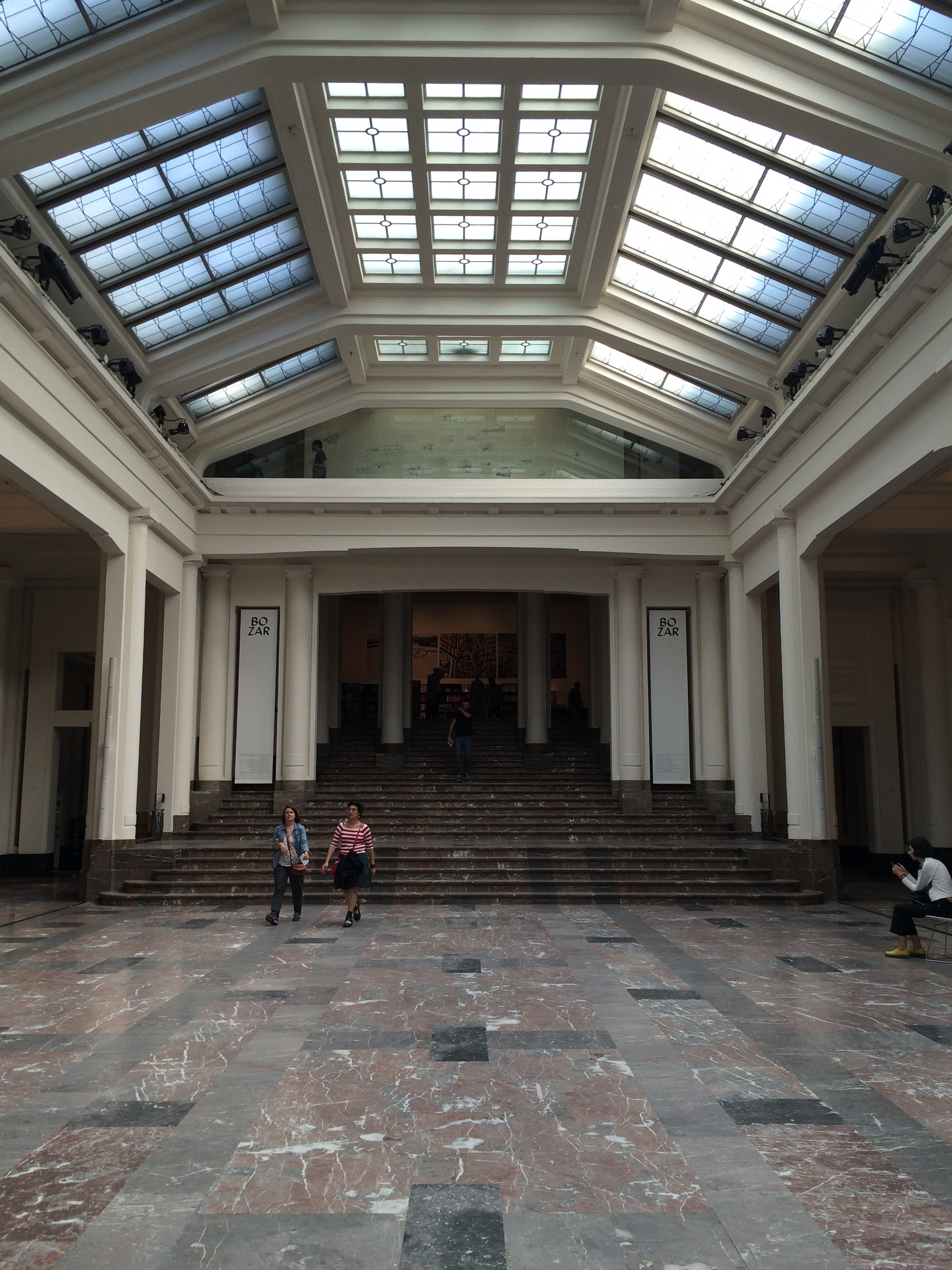
Exhibition hall of the Centre for Fine Arts

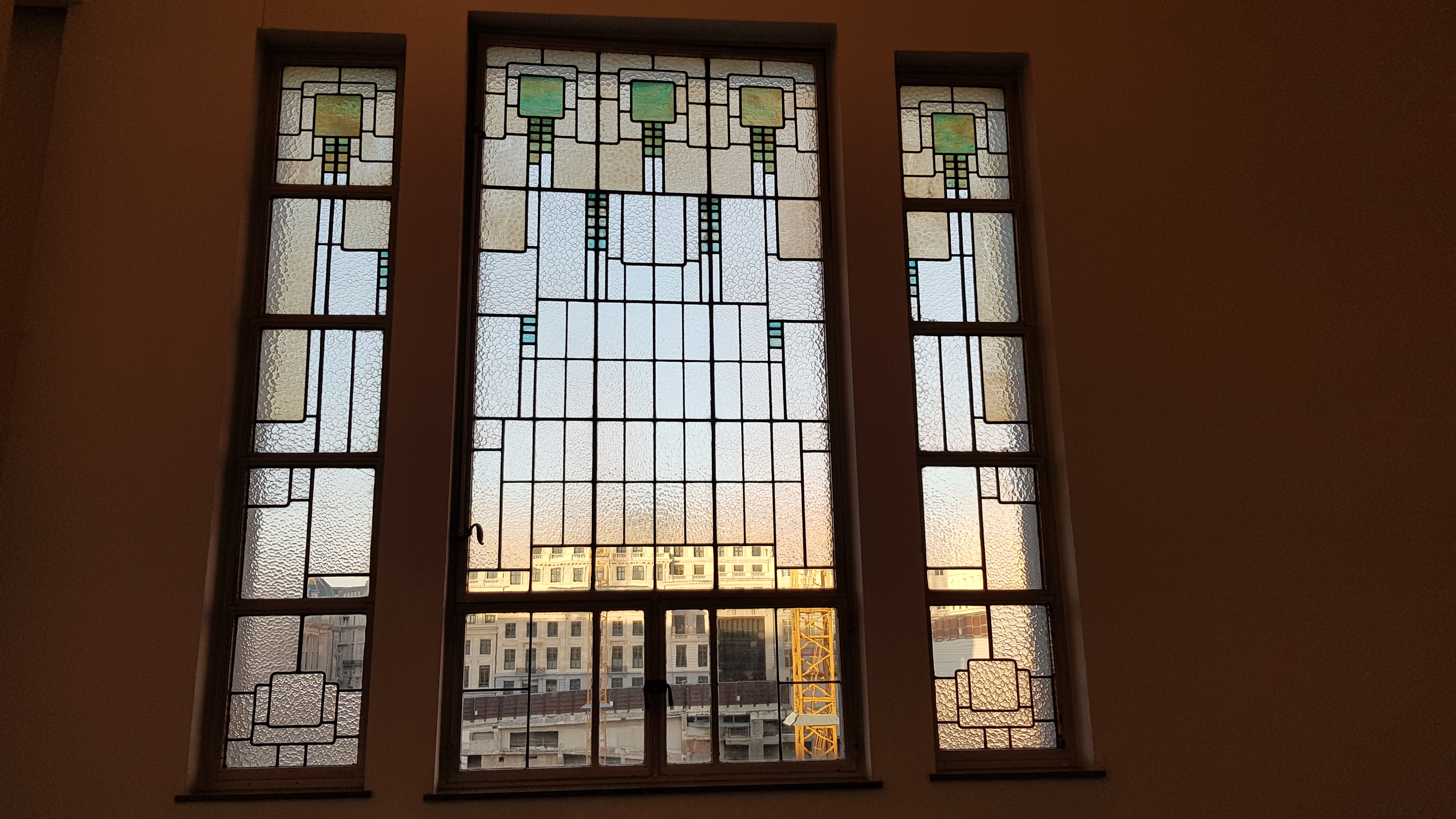
Window of the Centre for Fine Arts

=== Brussels-Central railway station (1913–1952) ===
In 1910, Horta began working on drawings on his most ambitious and longest running project: Brussels-Central railway station. He was formally commissioned as the architect in 1913, but work did not actually begin until after World War II, in 1952. It was originally planned that the station would just part of a much larger redevelopment project, which Horta had conceived in the 1920s, but this was never realized.

The start of construction was seriously delayed due to the lengthy process of purchasing and demolishing over one thousand buildings along the route of the new railway between Brussels' main stations, and then because of World War I. Construction finally began in 1937 as part of the plans to boost the economy during the Great Depression, before being delayed again by the outbreak of World War II. Horta was still working on the station when he died in 1947. The station was finally completed, to his plans, by his colleagues led by Maxime Brunfaut. It opened on 4 October 1952.

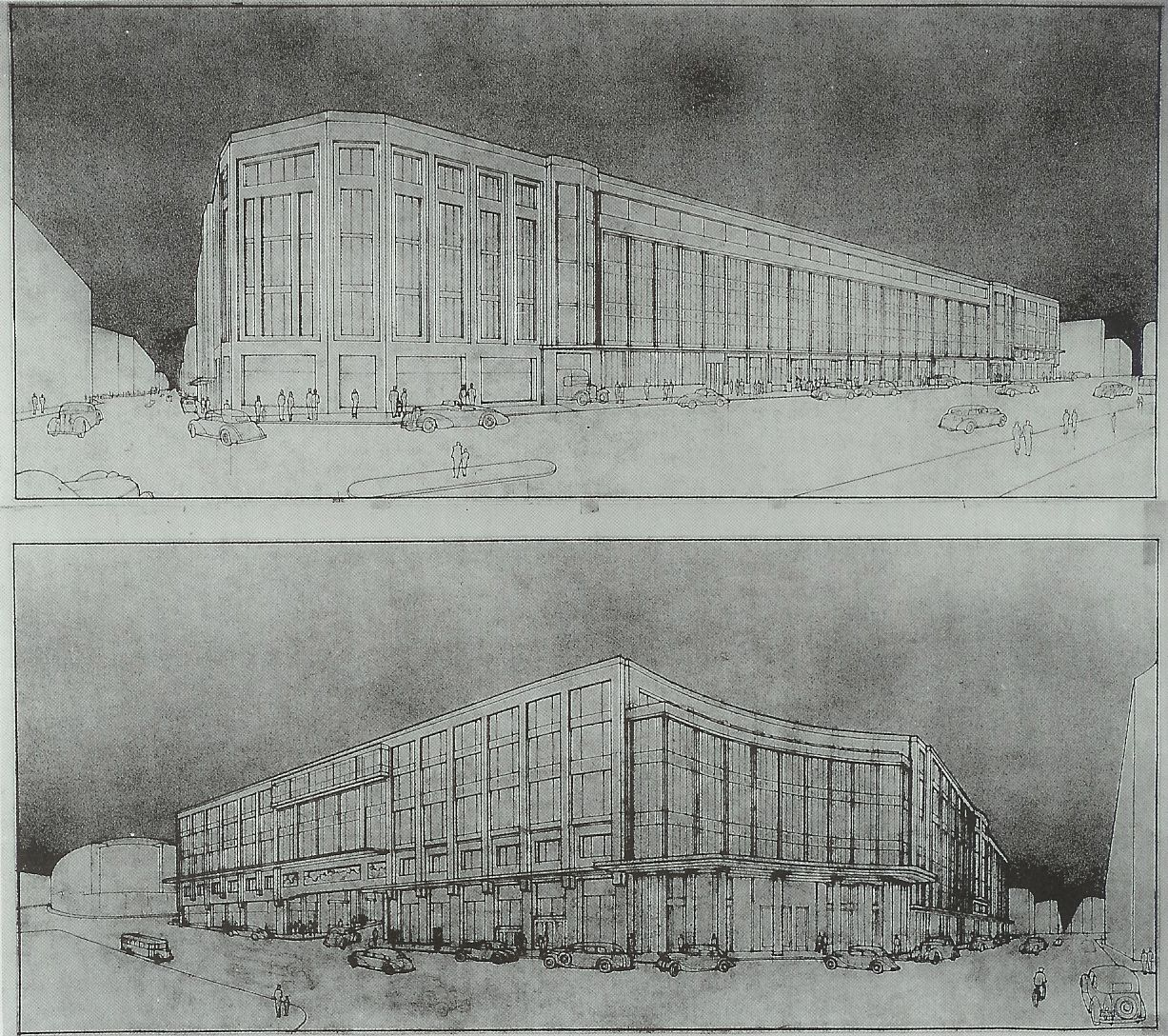
Draft of Brussels-Central railway station by Victor Horta (1913–1952)

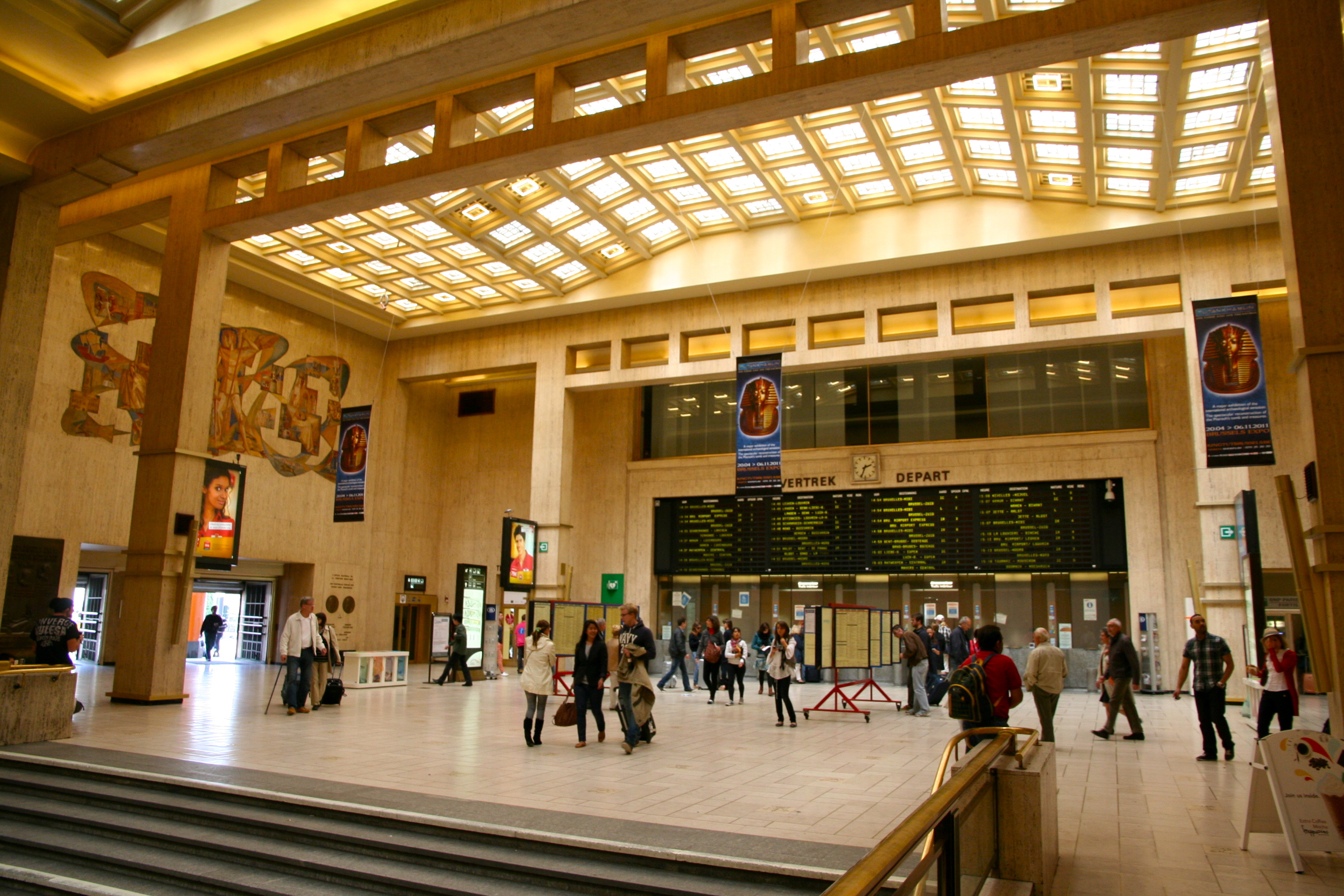
Main hall of Brussels-Central railway station

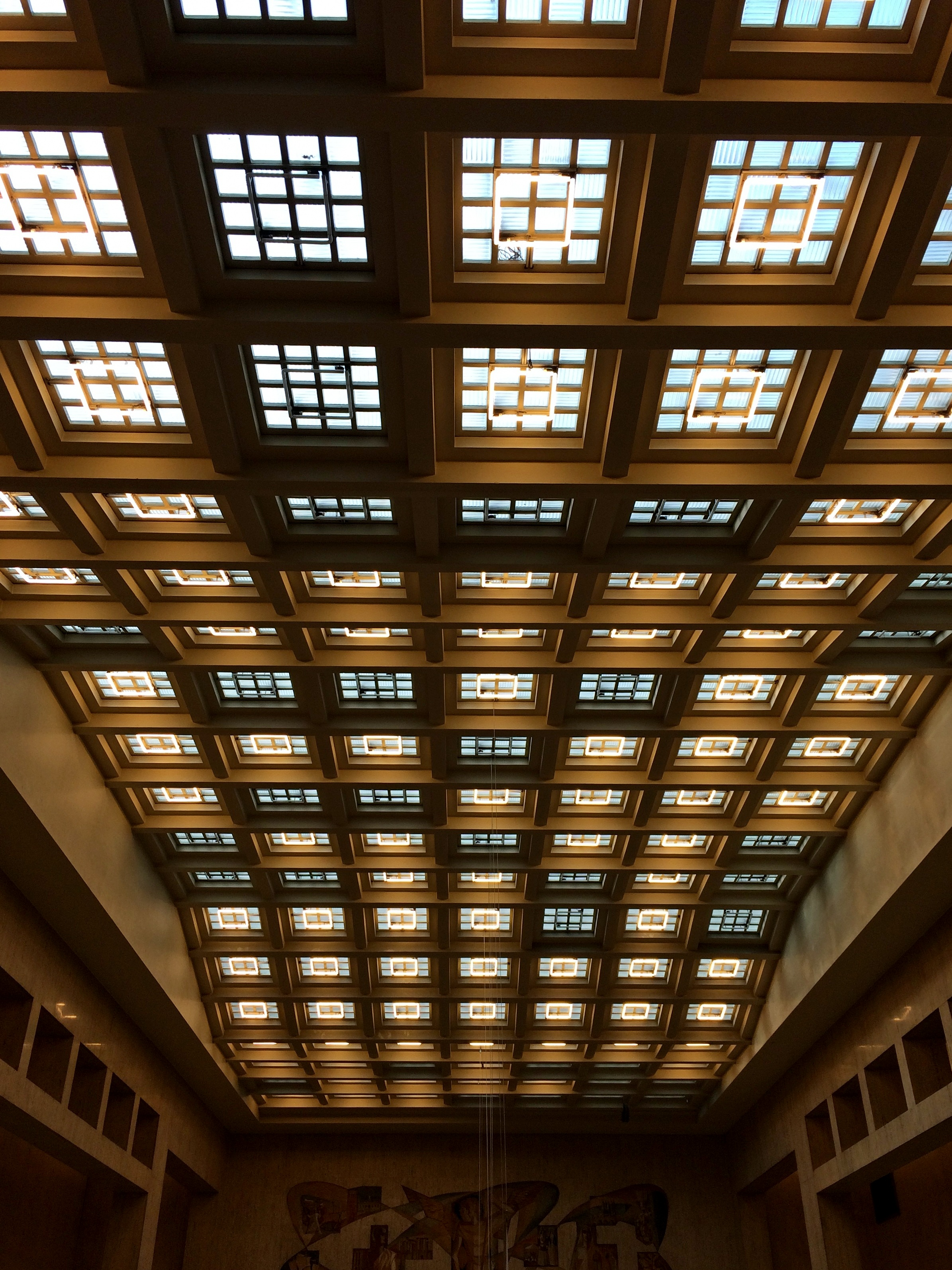
Ceiling of Brussels-Central railway station

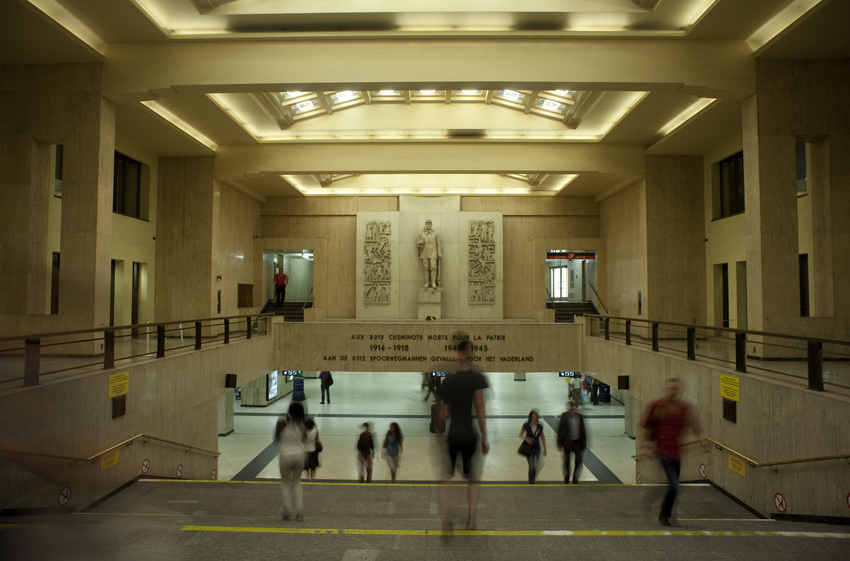
Stairway with exposed steel beams, Brussels-Central railway station

== Furniture ==
Horta typically designed not only the building but also the furniture to match his particular style. His furniture became as well known as his houses; a displays of his furniture were shown at the 1900 Universal Exposition in Paris, and the 1902 Turin Exposition of Modern Decorative Arts. It was typically hand-made, and the furniture for each house was different. In many cases the furniture lasted longer than the house. Its drawback was that, since it matched the house, it could not be changed to any other style, without disrupting the harmony of the room.

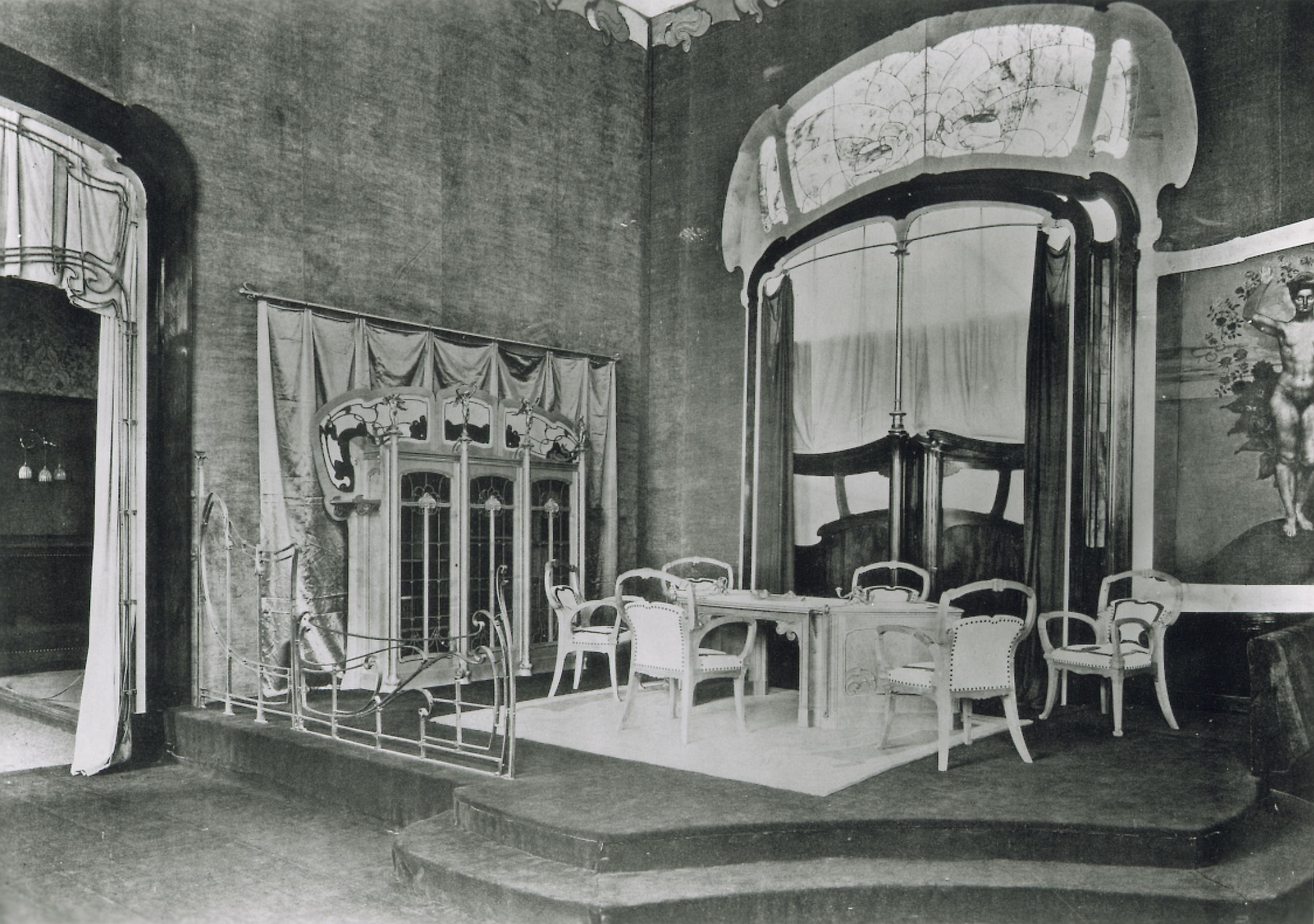
Dining room by Victor Horta displayed at the 1902 Turin International Exposition

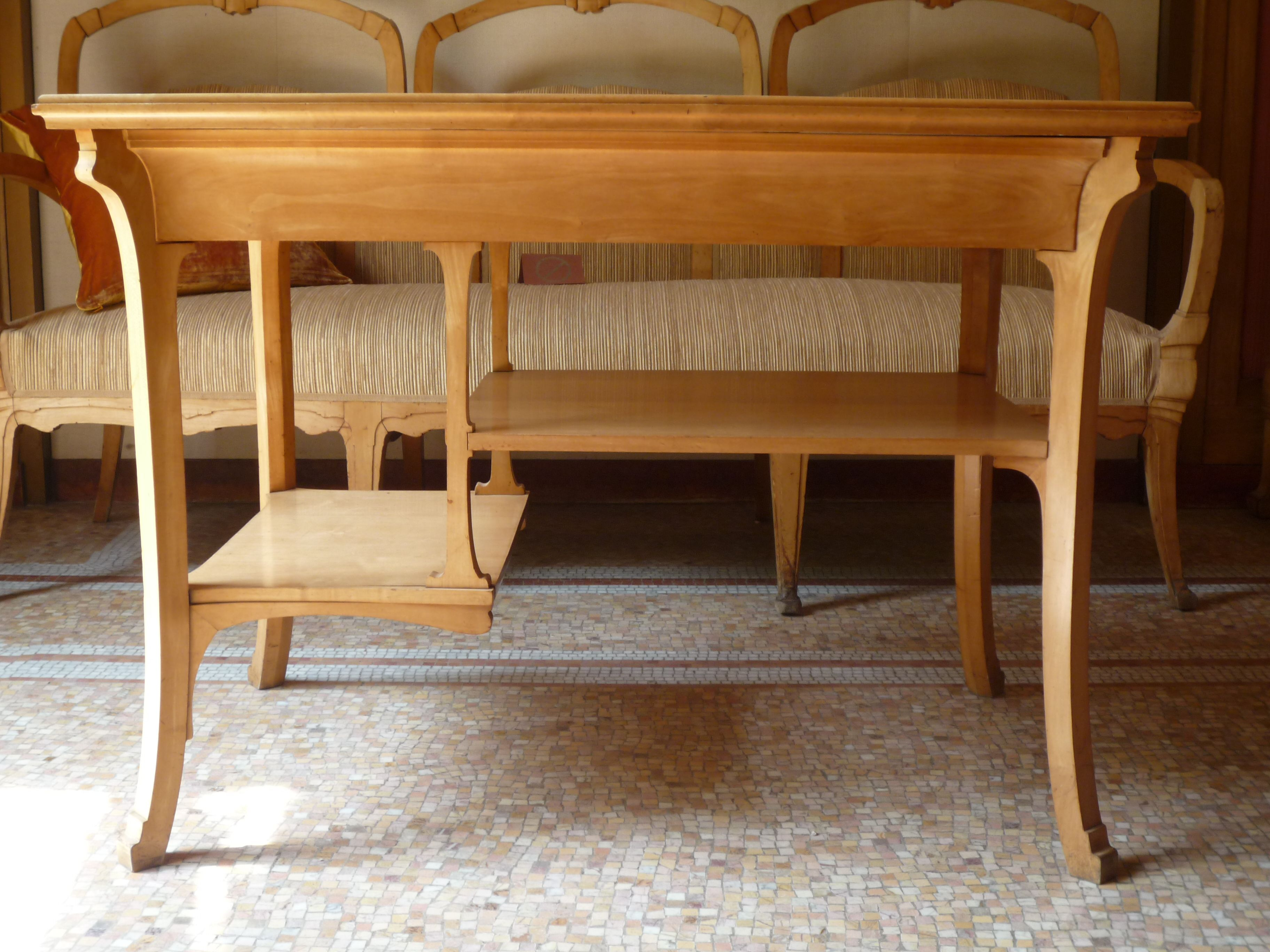
Table designed by Horta for the 1902 Turin Exposition

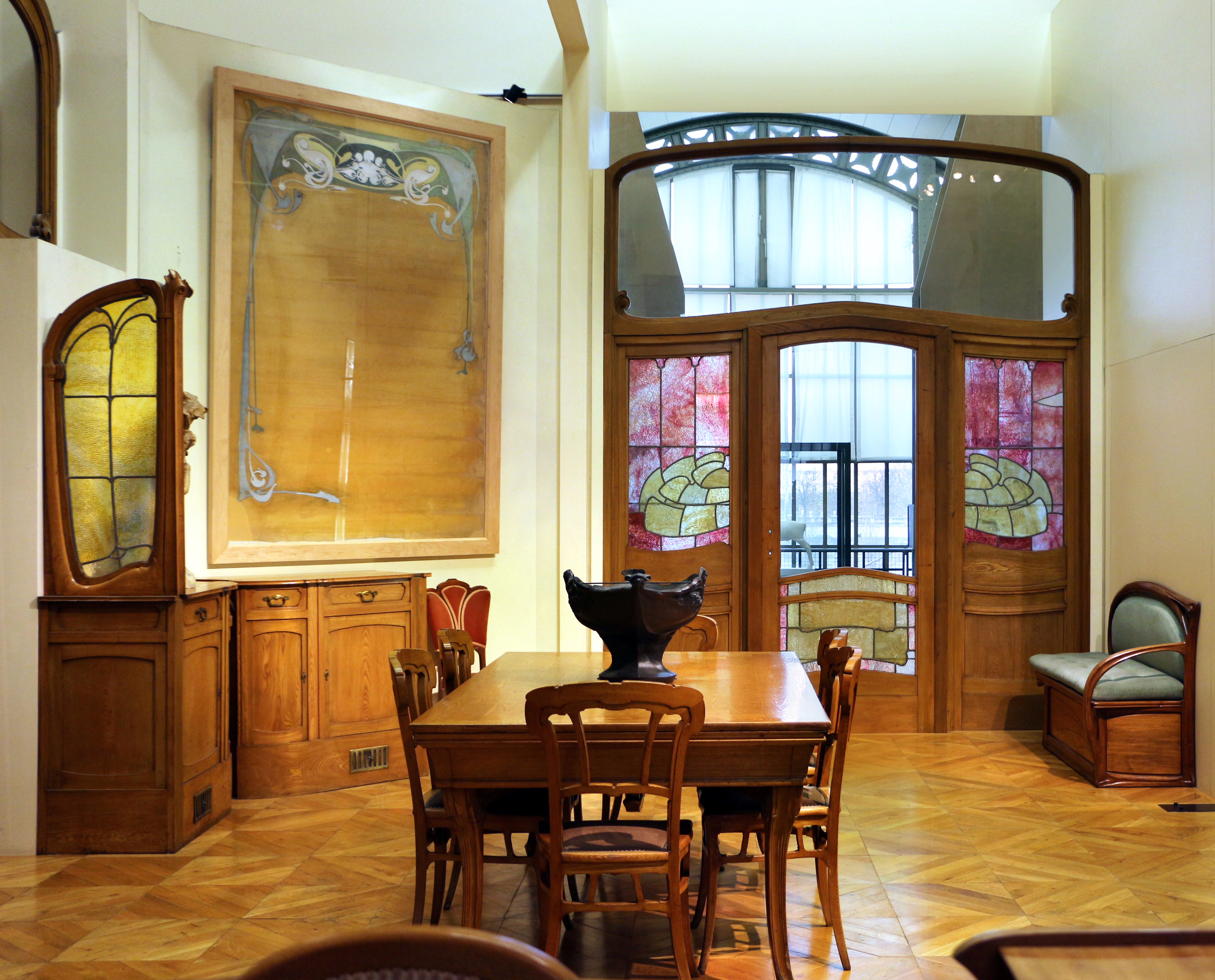
Dining room furniture and wall panel from the Hôtel Aubecq (1902–1904)

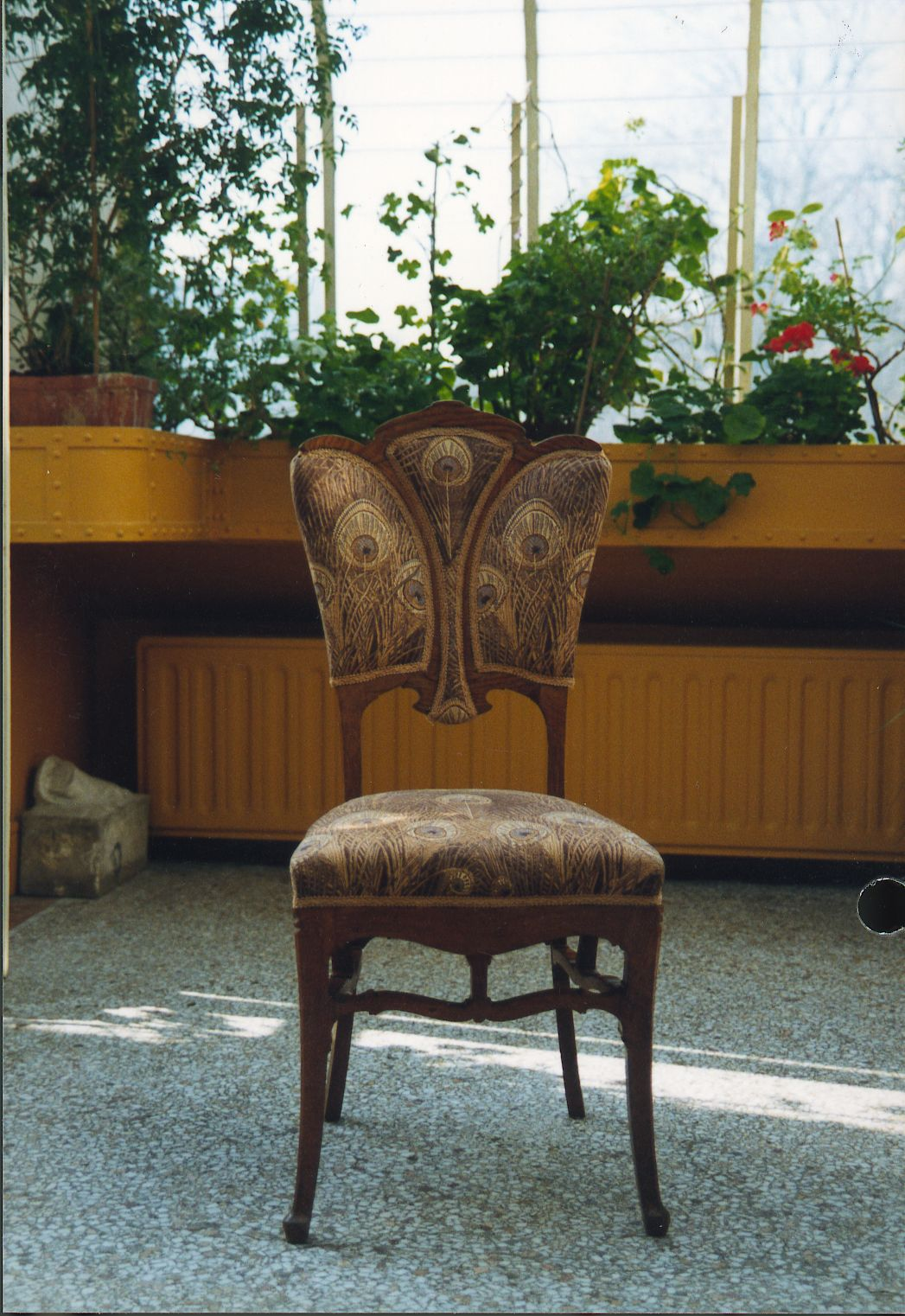
Peacock Chair from either the Hôtel Tassel or the Castle of La Hulpe

Mahogany chair (1900) (Cleveland Museum of Art)

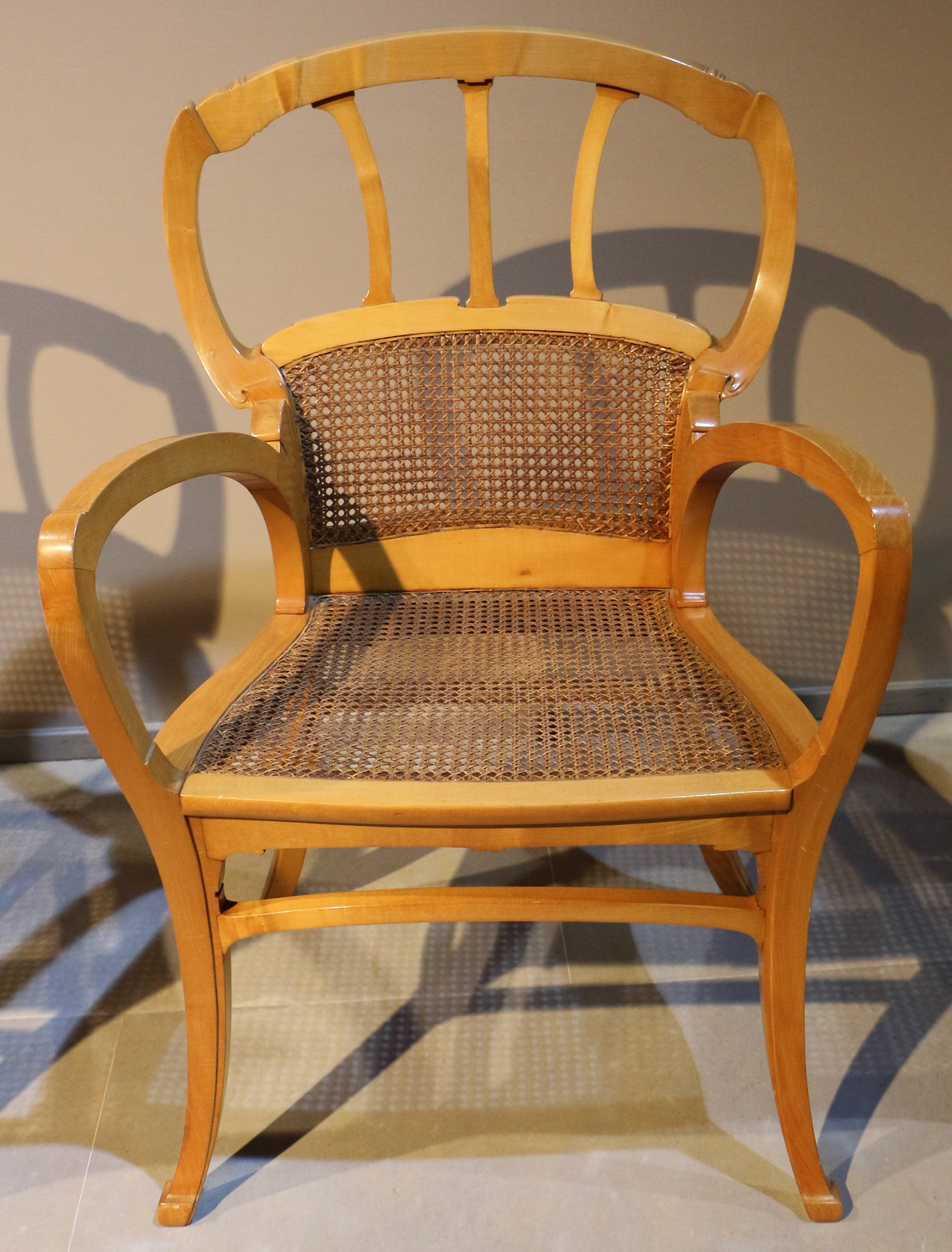
Chair from the Hotel Aubecq (1902–04), now in the Musée d'Orsay, Paris

== Later work and personal life ==
Horta and his first wife divorced in 1906. He married his second wife, Julia Carlsson, in 1908.

In 1925, he was an architect of honor for the Belgian Pavilion at the International Exhibition of Modern Decorative and Industrial Arts in Paris, the exposition which gave its name to Art Deco. In the same year, he became director of the Fine Arts section of the Belgian Royal Academy of Fine Arts.

In 1937, he completed the design of his final work, Brussels-Central railway station. In 1939, he began editing his memoirs. He died on 8 September 1947 and was interred in Ixelles Cemetery in Brussels.

=== Heritage ===
Art Nouveau fell out of fashion in the 20th century and many of Horta's buildings were abandoned, or even destroyed, most notably the Maison du Peuple/Volkshuis, demolished in 1965, as mentioned above. However, several of Horta's buildings are still standing in Brussels up to this day and some are available to tour. Jean Delhaye, an assistant of Horta's spent decades fighting to protect Horta's creations starting in the 1940s, and is responsible for many of the buildings that were saved at the time of Brusselisation—the conversion of the city to fast car travel and office-building—in the face of hostility from heritage watchdogs fixated at that time on neoclassical, Baroque and medieval architecture rather than Art Nouveau. Most notable are the Magasins Waucquez, formerly a department store, now the Belgian Comic Strip Center and four of his private houses (hôtels), which were designated as a UNESCO World Heritage Site in 2000 under the title "Major Town Houses of the Architect Victor Horta (Brussels)":

- Hôtel Tassel, designed and built for Prof. Émile Tassel in 1892–93
- Hôtel Solvay, designed and built in 1895–1900
- Hôtel van Eetvelde, designed and built in 1895–1901
- Horta House and Studio, designed and built in 1898–1901, now the Horta Museum, dedicated to his work

== Honors ==
- 1919
  - Officer of the Order of the Crown.
  - Member of the Royal Academy of Science, Letters and Fine Arts of Belgium
- 1920: Officer of the Order of Leopold
- 1925: Director of the Classe des Beaux-Arts of the Royal Academy of Science, Letters and Fine Arts of Belgium
- 1932: Created Baron Horta by Royal Decree and given a coat of arms

Horta was commemorated on the Belgian 2000 franc banknote issued from 1994 until the introduction of the euro.

On 6 January 2015, Google Doodle commemorated his 154th birthday.

== List of works ==
- 1885: Three houses, Twaalfkameren 49, 51, and 53, in Ghent (design)
- 1889: Pavilion of Human Passions, Parc du Cinquantenaire/Jubelpark, in the City of Brussels (protected monument since 1976)
- 1890: Matyn House, Rue de Bordeaux/Bordeauxstraat 50, in Saint-Gilles
- 1890: Renovations and interior decoration of the residence of the patron of the arts Henri Van Cutsem, Avenue des Arts/Kunstlaan 16, in Saint-Josse-ten-Noode (today the Charlier Museum)
- 1892–1893: Hôtel Tassel, Rue Paul-Emile Janson/Paul-Emile Jansonstraat 6, in the City of Brussels
- 1893: Autrique House, Chaussée de Haecht/Haachtsesteenweg 266, in Schaerbeek
- 1894: Hôtel Winssinger, Rue de l'Hôtel de la Monnaie/Munthofstraat 66, in Saint-Gilles
- 1894: Hôtel Frison, Rue Lebeau/Lebeaustraat 37, in the City of Brussels
- 1894: Studio for the sculptor Godefroid Devreese, Rue des Ailes/Vleugelstraat 71, in Schaerbeek (modified)
- 1894: Hôtel Solvay, Avenue Louise/Louizalaan 224, in the City of Brussels
- 1895: Interior decoration of the house of the painter Anna Boch, Boulevard de la Toison d'Or/Guldenvlieslaan 78, in Saint-Gilles (demolished)
- 1895–1898: Hôtel van Eetvelde, Avenue Palmerston/Palmerstonlaan 2/6, in the City of Brussels
- 1896–1898: Maison du Peuple/Volkshuis, Place Emile Vandervelde/Emile Vanderveldeplein, in the City of Brussels (demolished in 1965)
- 1897–1899: Kindergarten, Rue Sainte-Ghislaine/Sint-Gisleinstraat 40, in the City of Brussels
- 1898–1900: Horta House and Studio, Rue Américaine/Amerikaansestraat 23–25, in Saint-Gilles (today the Horta Museum)
- 1899: Frison House (Les Épinglettes), Avenue Circulaire/Ringlaan 70, in Uccle
- 1899: Hôtel Aubecq, Avenue Louise/Louizalaan 520, in the City of Brussels (demolished in 1950)
- 1899–1903: Villa Carpentier (Les Platanes), Doorniksesteenweg 9–11, in Ronse
- 1900: Extension of the Maison Furnémont, Rue Gatti de Gamond/Gatti de Gamondstraat 149, in Uccle
- 1900: À L'Innovation department store, Rue Neuve/Nieuwstraat 111, in the City of Brussels (destroyed by fire in 1967)
- 1901: House and Studio for the sculptor Fernant Dubois, Avenue Brugmann/Brugmannlaan 80, in Forest
- 1901: House and Studio for the sculptor Pieter-Jan Braecke, Rue de l'Abdication/Troonafstandstraat 51, in the City of Brussels
- 1902: Hôtel Max Hallet, Avenue Louise/Louizalaan 346, in the City of Brussels
- 1903: Funeral monument for the composer Johannes Brahms in the Vienna Central Cemetery (in collaboration with the Austrian sculptor Ilse Twardowski-Conrat)
- 1903: Magasins Waucquez department store, Rue du Sable/Zandstraat 20, in the City of Brussels (today the Belgian Comic Strip Center
- 1903: House for the art critic Sander Pierron, Rue de l'Aqueduc/Waterleidingsstraat 157, in Ixelles
- 1903: Grand Bazar Anspach department store, Rue de l'Evêque/Bisschopsstraat 66, in the City of Brussels (demolished)
- 1903: Emile Vinck House, Rue de Washington/Washingtonstraat 85, in Ixelles (converted in 1927 by the architect A. Blomme)
- 1903: À L'Innovation department store, Chausée d'Ixelles/Elsenesteenweg 39–51, in Ixelles (converted)
- 1904: Gym for the boarding school Les Peupliers, in Vilvoorde
- 1905: Villa Fernand Dubois, Rue Maredret, in Sosoye
- 1906: Brugmann Hospital, Place Arthur Van Gehuchten/Arthur Van Gehuchtenplein, in Jette (first design; opened in 1923)
- 1907: Magasins Hicklet, Rue Neuve/Nieuwstraat 20, in the City of Brussels (converted)
- 1909: Wolfers Jewellers Shop, Rue d'Arenberg/Arenbergstraat 11–13, in the City of Brussels
- 1910: House for the Dr. Terwagne, Van Rijkswijcklaan 62, in Antwerp
- 1911: Magasins Absalon department store, Rue Saint-Christophe/Sint-Kristoffelstraat 41, in the City of Brussels
- 1911: Wiener House, Avenue de l'Astronomie/Sterrekundelaan, in Saint-Josse-ten-Noode (demolished)
- 1912: Brussels-Central railway station (first designs; completed by Maxime Brunfaut and inaugurated in 1952)
- 1920: Centre for Fine Arts, Rue Ravenstein/Ravensteinstraat, in the City of Brussels (first design; opened in 1928)
- 1925: Belgian pavilion at the Exposition Internationale des Arts Décoratifs et Industriels Modernes of Paris in 1925
- 1928: Museum of Fine Arts, in Tournai

== Gallery ==
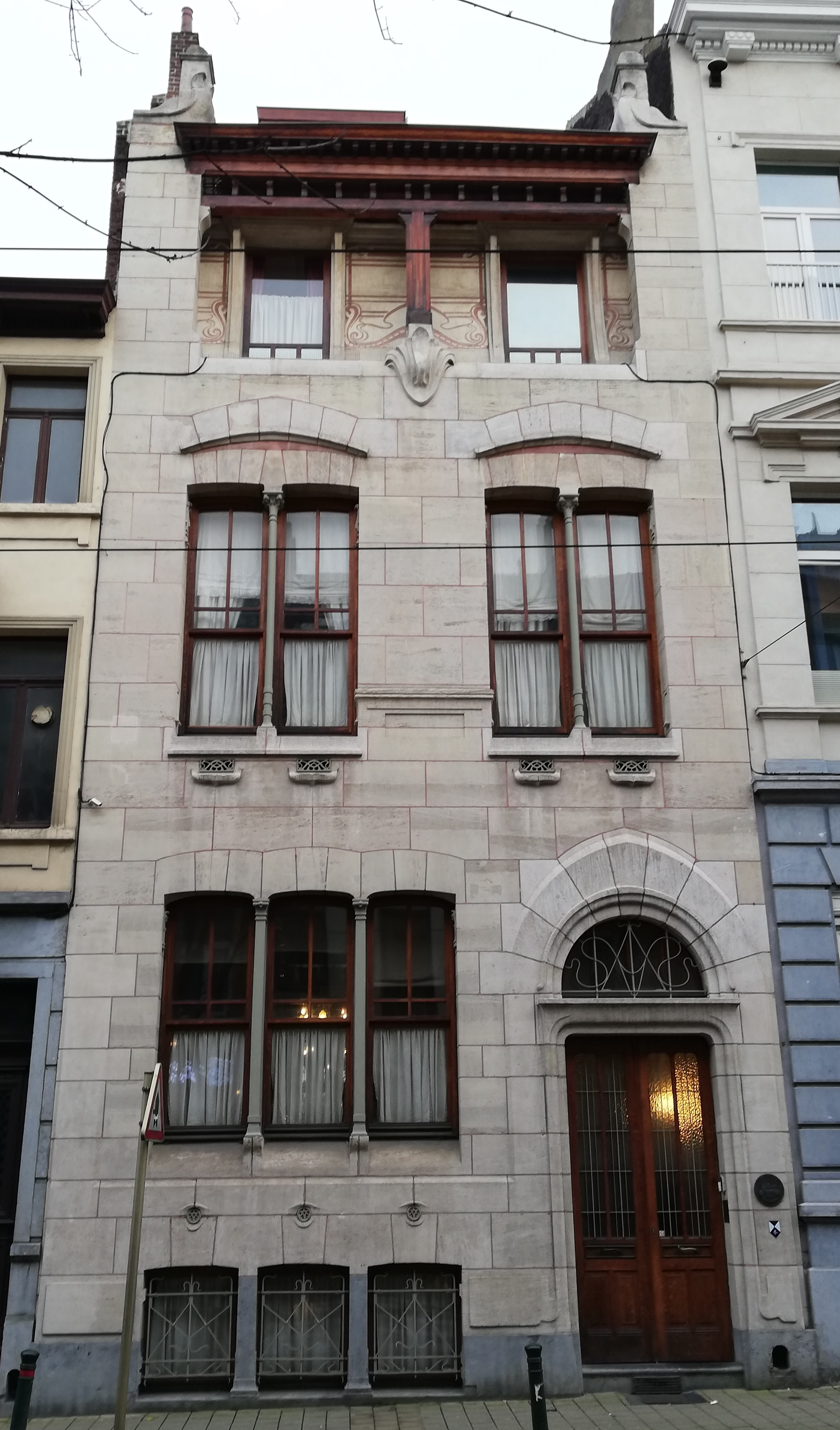
Autrique House, Brussels (1893)

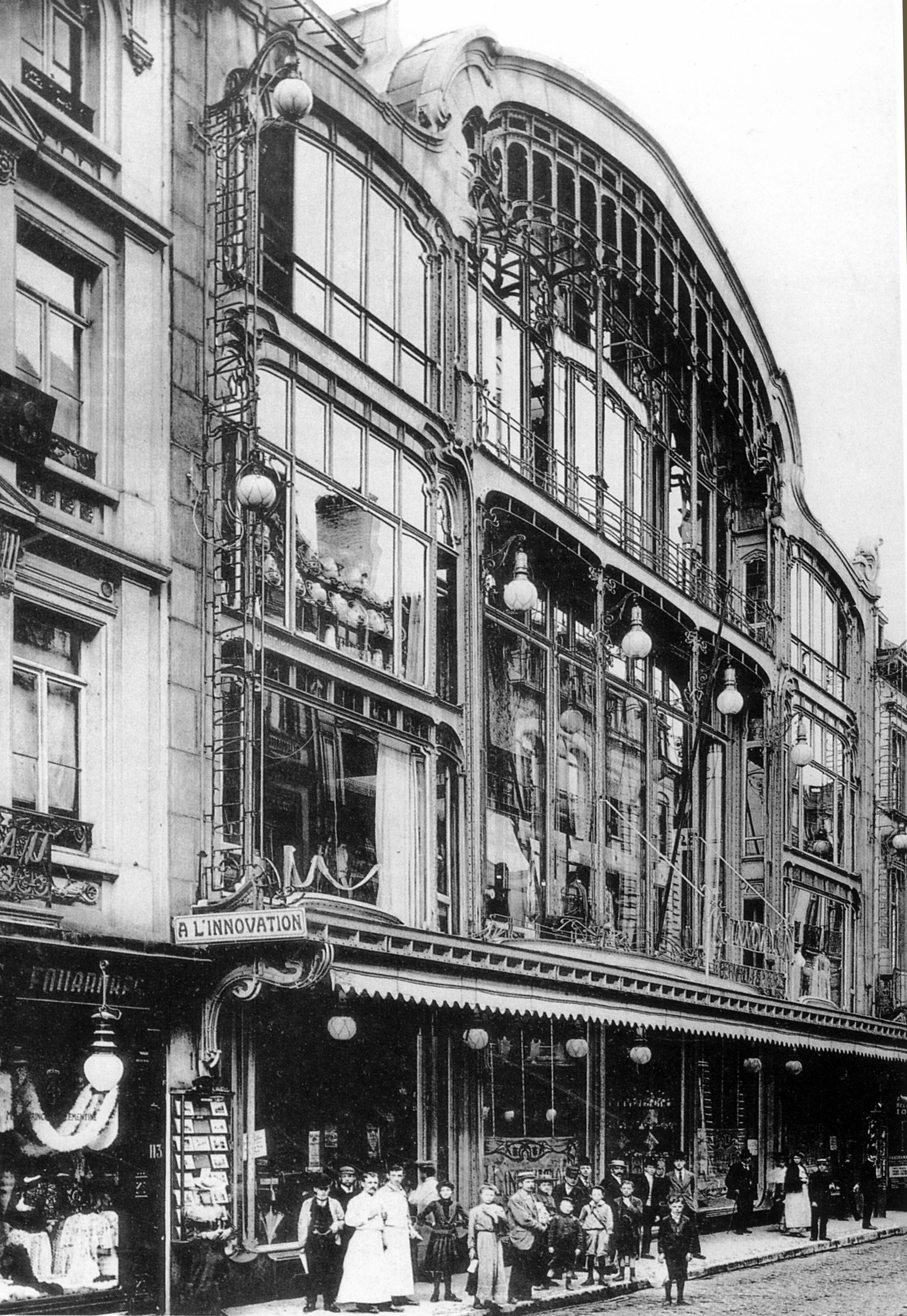
À L'Innovation department store, Brussels (1901) (burned down and then demolished)

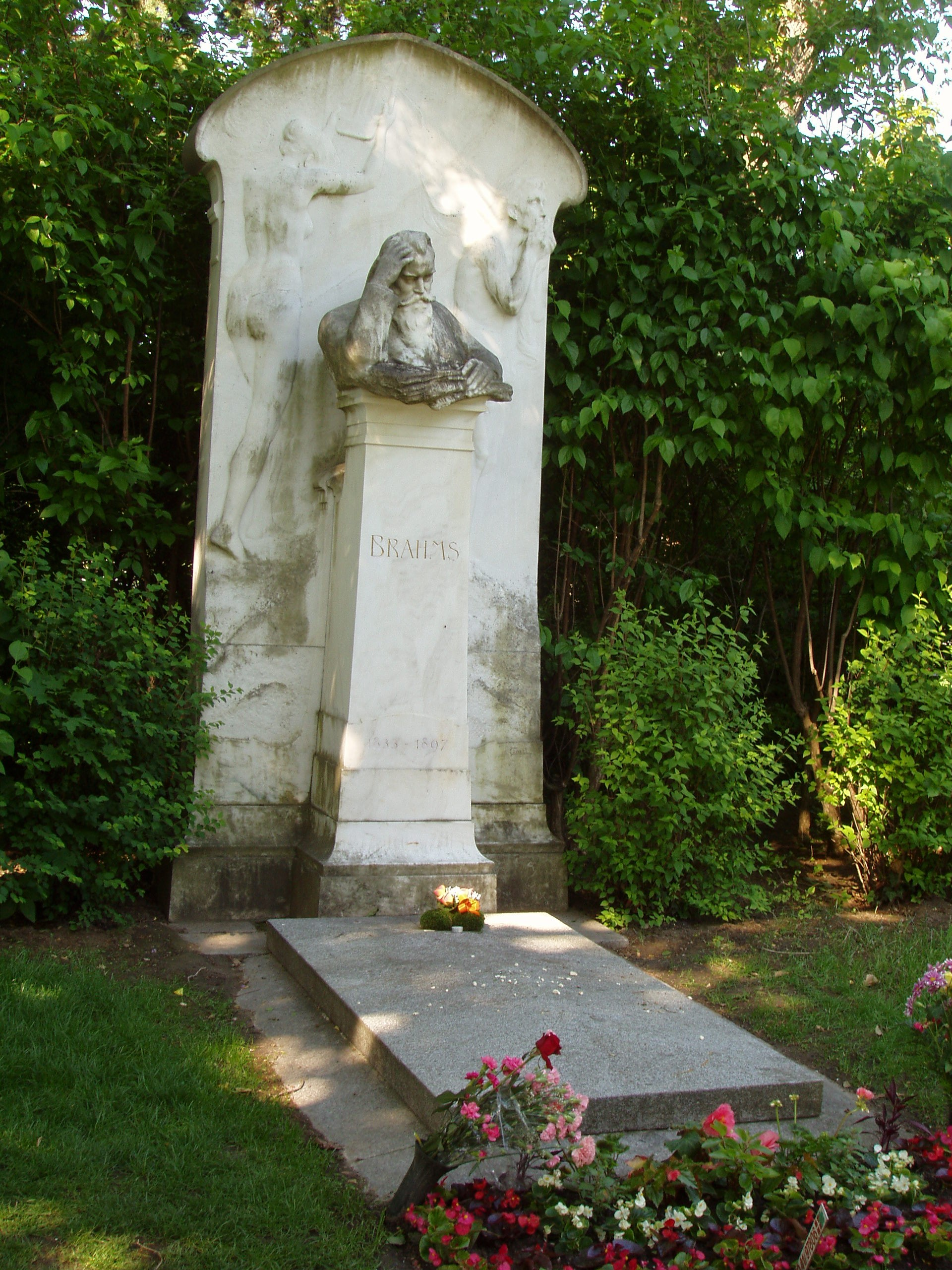
Brahms' grave in the Vienna Central Cemetery (1903)

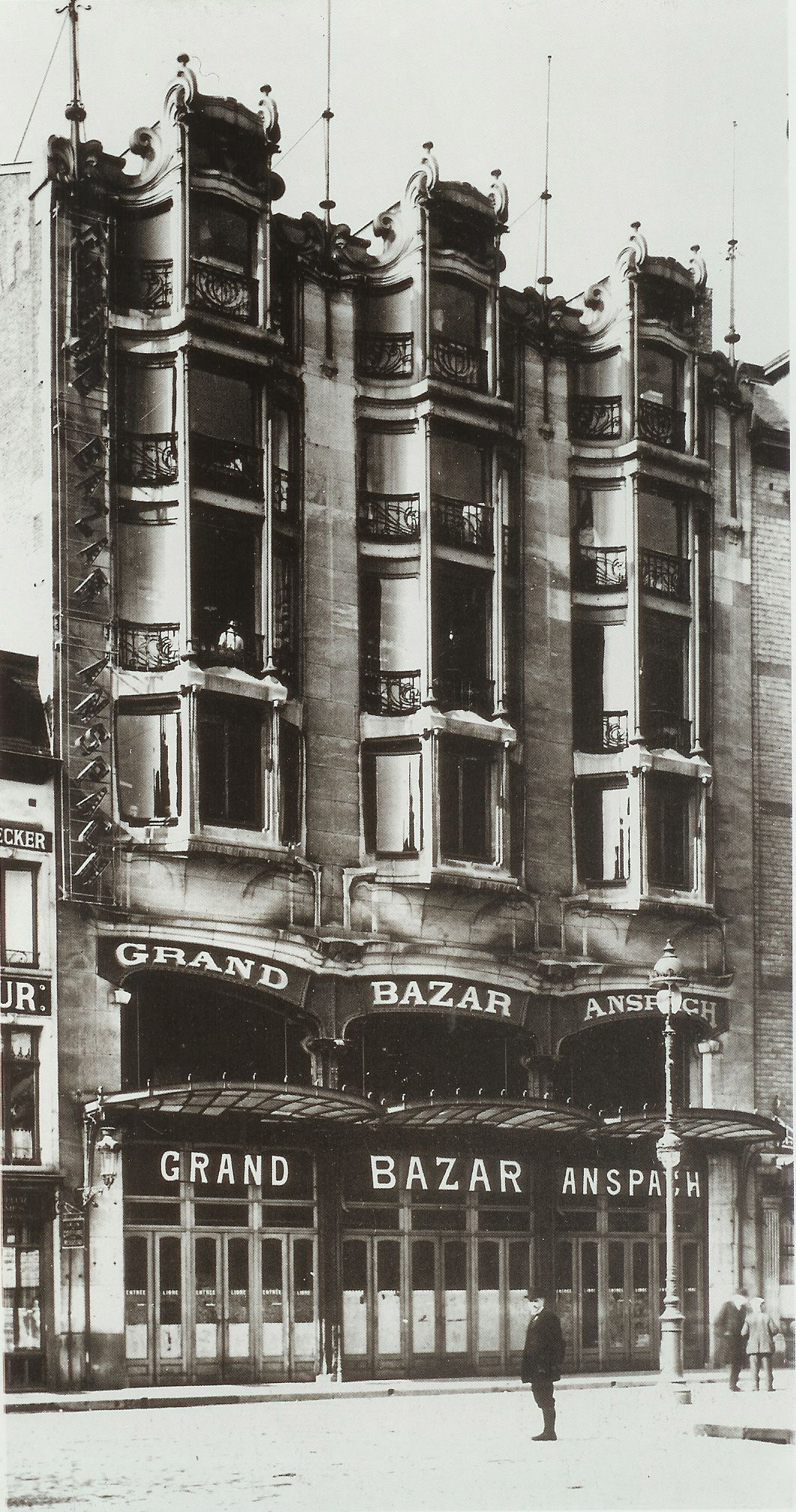
Grand Bazar Anspach department store, Brussels (1903) (demolished)

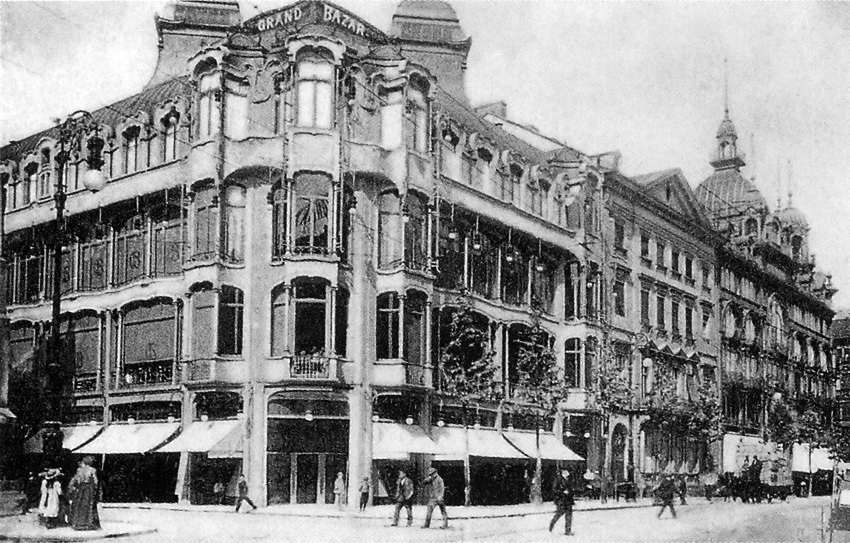
Le Grand Bazar department store, Frankfurt (1903–1905) (demolished)

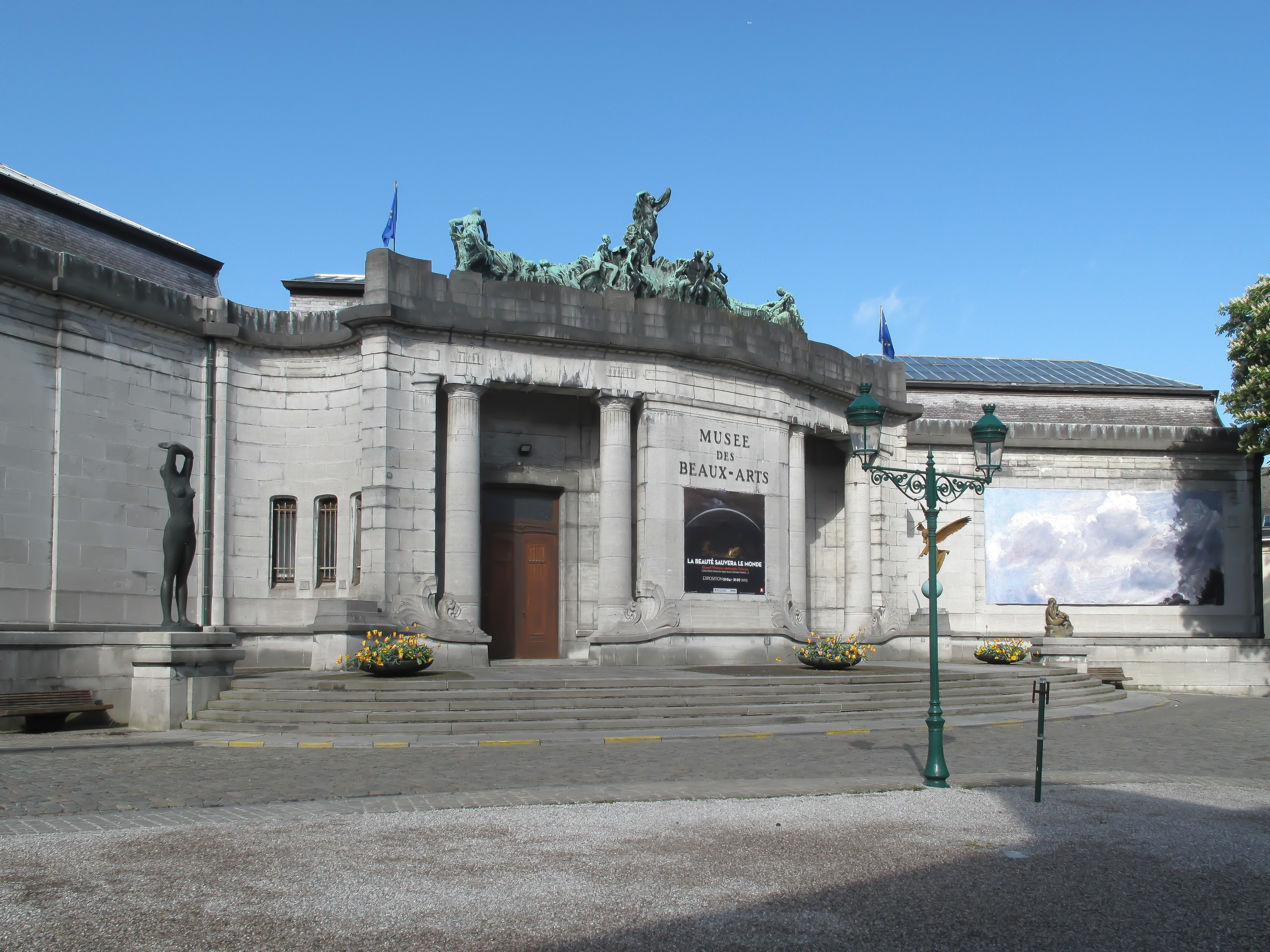
Museum of Fine Arts, Tournai (1928)

== See also ==
- Art Nouveau in Brussels
- History of Brussels
- Belgium in the long nineteenth century
