= Major town houses of the architect Victor Horta (Brussels) =

Four town houses in Brussels, Belgium

Major Town Houses of the Architect Victor Horta (Brussels)
UNESCO World Heritage Site
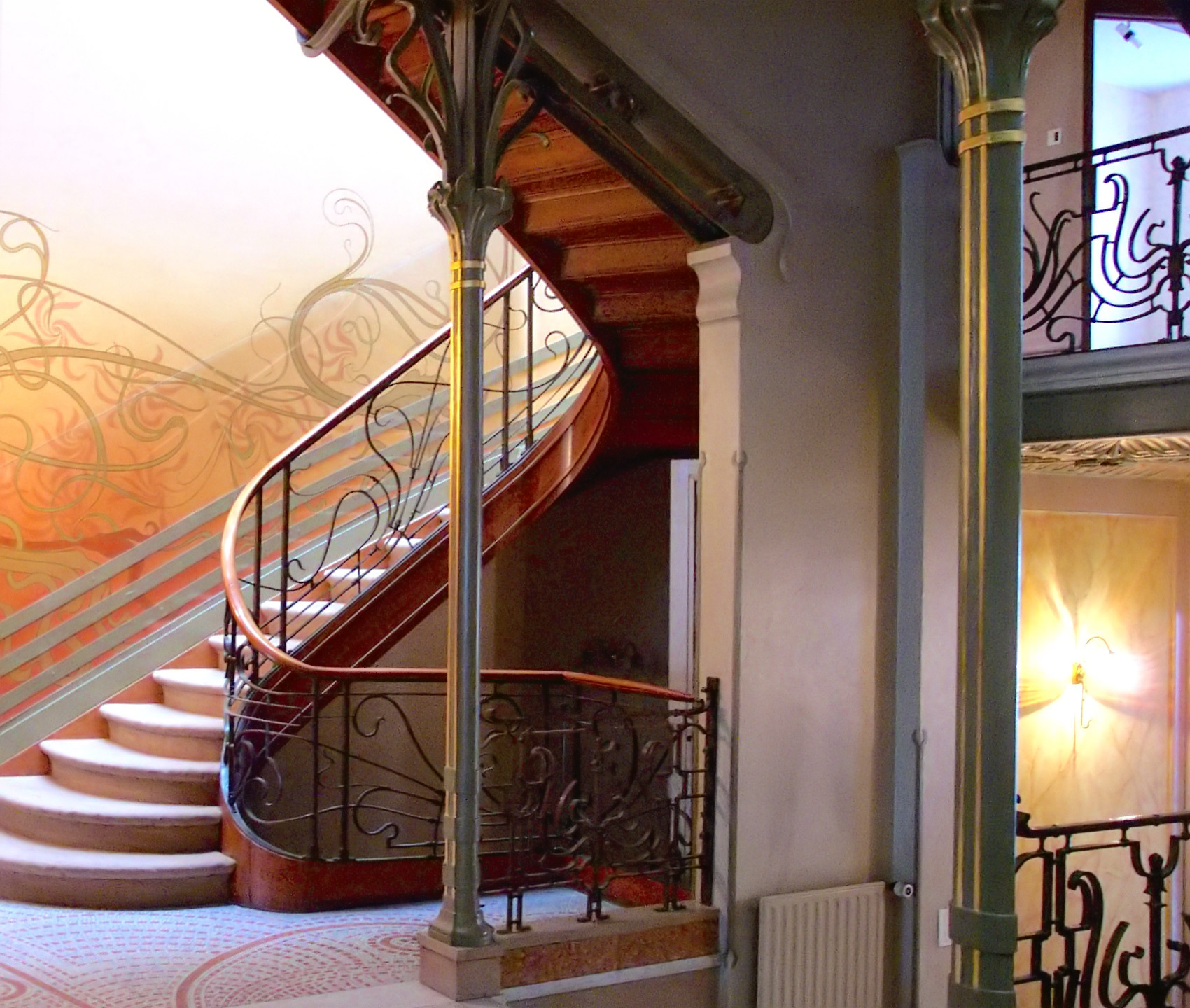
- Staircase in the Tassel House

- Location within Belgium
- Location: Brussels, Belgium
- Includes: 1. Hôtel Tassel; 2. Hôtel Solvay; 3. Hôtel van Eetvelde; 4. Maison & Atelier Horta
- Criteria: Cultural: (i), (ii), (iv)
- Reference: 1005
- Inscription: 2000 (24th Session)

The major town houses of Victor Horta are four town houses in Brussels, Belgium, which have been listed as a UNESCO World Heritage Site since 2000. All four houses were designed and built by the Belgian architect Victor Horta (1861–1947), who pioneered the Art Nouveau style during the mid-1890s.

== History ==
Victor Horta was born in Ghent, Belgium, in 1861 and lived for several years in Paris before returning to Belgium to work as an architect in 1880. He achieved rapid success, working on several prestigious buildings and receiving a number of official posts including a position at the Free University of Brussels.

From 1892, Horta began working in the new Art Nouveau style. In 1893, he designed the Hôtel Tassel, which is considered one of the first examples of Art Nouveau architecture (along with the Hankar House by Paul Hankar, built at the same time). He applied the same style to many subsequent buildings, including the Hôtel Solvay (built 1895–1900), the Hôtel van Eetvelde (1895–1901), and his own house and workshop (1898–1901). Among the architects who were inspired by Horta's works of the period are Antoni Gaudí and Hector Guimard.

During World War I, Horta went into exile in the United Kingdom and the United States. On returning to Belgium, Horta modified his styles in subsequent buildings, moving away from Art Nouveau towards Art Deco or Modernist styles to take account of changing popular tastes. He died on 8 September 1947 and was interred in Ixelles Cemetery in Brussels.

== List ==
Four houses are included in the UNESCO listing.

| Title | Image | Location (within Brussels) | Description |
|---|---|---|---|
| Hôtel Tassel | | Rue Paul-Emile Janson/Paul-Emile Jansonstraat 6 | Built in 1892–93, the building is considered one of the first examples of Art Nouveau architecture in the world. |
| Hôtel Solvay | | Avenue Louise/Louizalaan 224 | Built in 1895–1900 |
| Hôtel van Eetvelde | | Avenue Palmerston/Palmerstonlaan 2–4 | Built in 1895–1901 |
| Maison & Atelier Horta | | Rue Américaine/Amerikaanse straat 23–25 | Built in 1898–1901, the building houses a museum focusing on Horta's life and is among the few buildings by the architect that are open to the public. |

Among the notable surviving examples of Horta's Art Nouveau architecture in Belgium that are not included in the UNESCO listing are the Hôtel Max Hallet (1903–1906) and the Magasins Waucquez (1905–1906), which is now the Belgian Comic Strip Center.

== Recognition ==
The UNESCO commission recognised them in 2000:

The four major town houses—Hôtel Tassel, Hôtel Solvay, Hôtel van Eetvelde, and Maison & Atelier Horta—located in Brussels and designed by the architect Victor Horta, one of the earliest initiators of Art Nouveau, are some of the most remarkable pioneering works of architecture of the end of the 19th century. The stylistic revolution represented by these works is characterised by their open plan, the diffusion of light, and the brilliant joining of the curved lines of decoration with the structure of the building.

The four houses were selected on the basis of their architectural importance but also because of their state of conservation.

== See also ==
- Art Nouveau in Brussels
- History of Brussels
- Culture of Belgium
- Belgium in the long nineteenth century
