= Hôtel Tassel =

Historic Art Nouveau house and UNESCO World Heritage Site in Brussels, Belgium

- Hôtel Tassel (French); Hotel Tassel (Dutch)
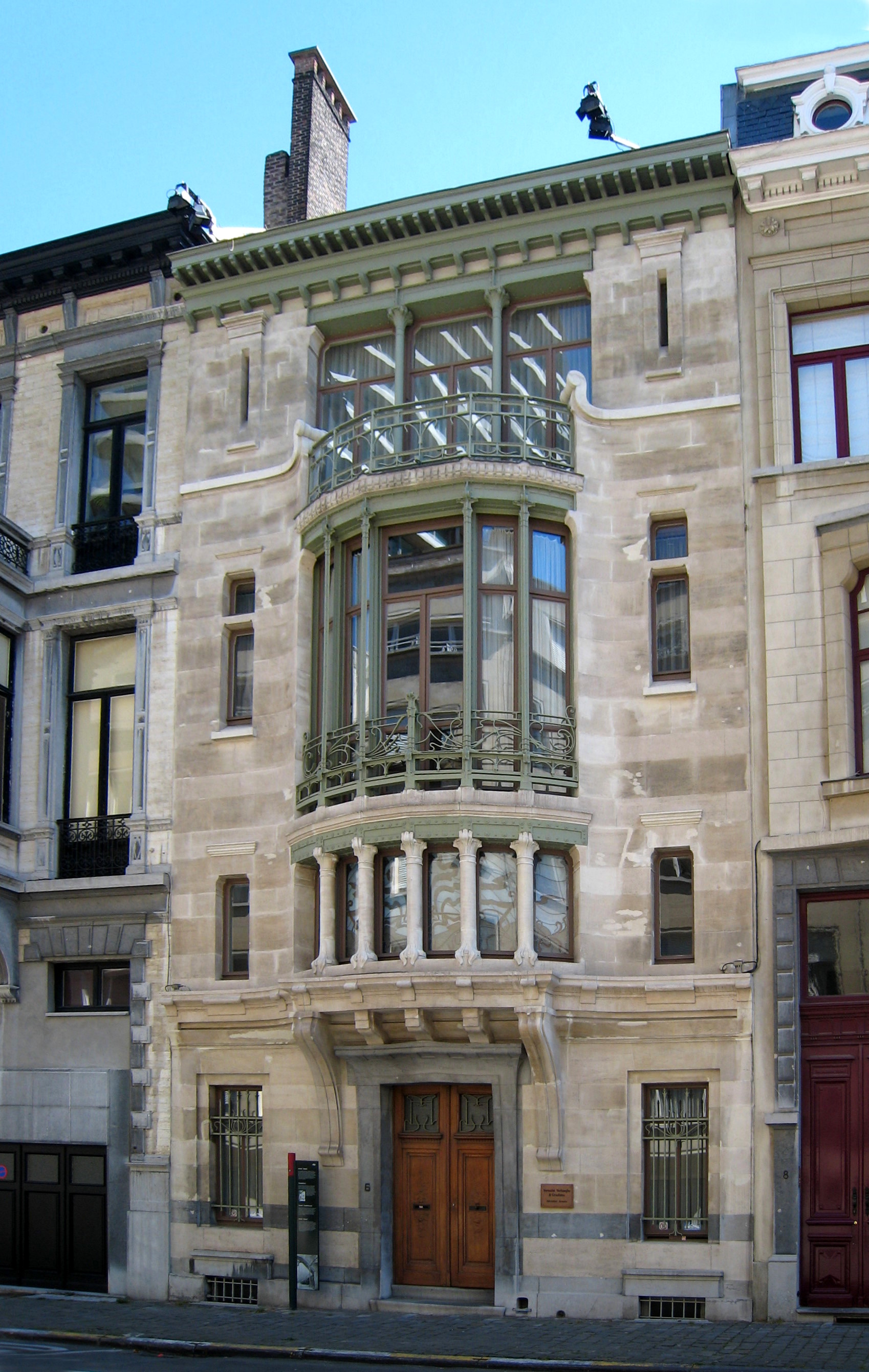
- Main façade of the Hôtel Tassel
- Interactive map of the Hôtel Tassel area

General information
- Type: Town house
- Architectural style: Art Nouveau
- Location: Rue Paul-Emile Janson / Paul-Emile Jansonstraat 6, 1000 City of Brussels, Brussels-Capital Region, Belgium
- Coordinates: 50°49′40″N 4°21′43.3″E
- Construction started: 1892
- Completed: 1893
- Client: Emile Tassel

Design and construction
- Architect: Victor Horta

UNESCO World Heritage Site
- Official name: Major Town Houses of the Architect Victor Horta (Brussels)
- Type: Cultural
- Criteria: i, ii, iv
- Designated: 2000 (24th session)
- Reference no.: 1005
- Region: Europe and North America

The Hôtel Tassel (French: Hôtel Tassel; Dutch: Hotel Tassel), also known as the Tassel House, is a historic town house in Brussels, Belgium. It was designed by Victor Horta for the scientist and professor Emile Tassel, and built between 1892 and 1893, in Art Nouveau style. It is considered one of the first buildings in that style (along with the Hankar House by Paul Hankar, built at the same time) because of its highly innovative plan and its ground-breaking use of materials and decoration. It is located at 6, rue Paul-Emile Janson/Paul-Emile Jansonstraat, a few steps from the Avenue Louise/Louizalaan.

Together with three other town houses of Victor Horta, including Horta's own house and workshop, it was added to the UNESCO World Heritage list in 2000 as the core of epoch-making urban residences that Horta designed before 1900.

== History ==
The first town house built by Victor Horta was the Autrique House. This dwelling was already innovative for its application of a novel Art Nouveau decorative scheme that did not include references to other historical styles. However, the floor plan and spatial composition of the Autrique House remained rather traditional. On the deep and narrow building plot, the rooms were organised according to a traditional scheme used in most Belgian town houses at the time. It had a suite of rooms on the left side of the building plot, flanked by a rather narrow entrance hall with stairs and a corridor that led to a small garden at the back. Of the three-room suite, only the first and the last had windows, so the middle room, used mostly as a dining room, was rather gloomy.

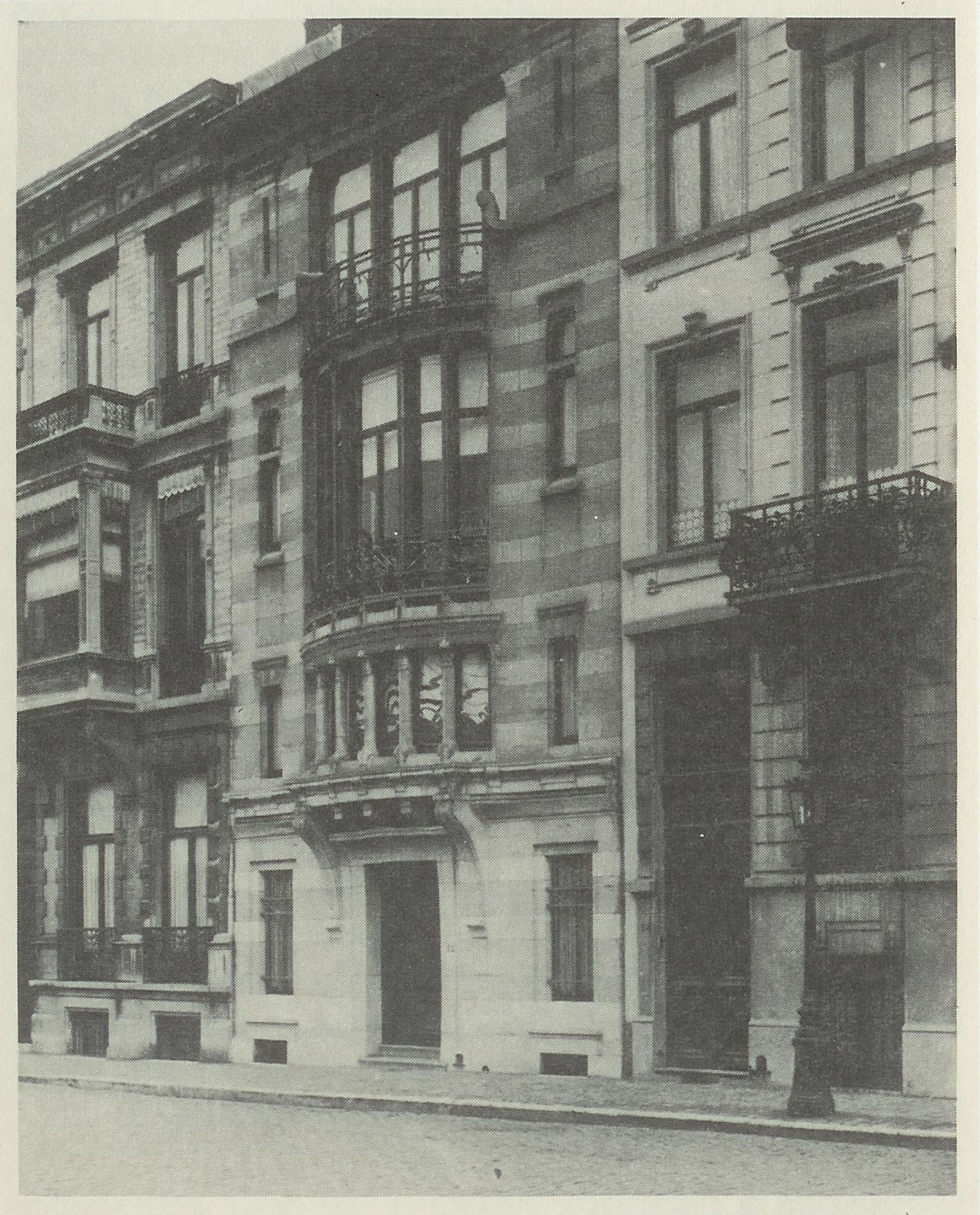
The Hôtel Tassel in the early 20th century

At the Hôtel Tassel, Horta definitively broke with this traditional scheme; in fact, he built a house consisting of three different parts. Two rather conventional buildings in brick and natural stone—one on the side of the street and one on the side of the garden—were linked by a steel structure covered with glass. It functions as the connective part in the spatial composition of the house and contains staircases and landings that connect the different rooms and floors. Through the glass roof, it functions as a light shaft that brings natural light into the centre of the building. In this part of the house, that could also be used for receiving guests, Horta made the maximum of his skills as an interior designer. He designed every single detail: door handles, woodwork, panels and windows in stained glass, mosaic flooring and furnishings. He succeeded in integrating the lavish decoration without masking the general architectural structures.

The innovations made in the Hôtel Tassel would mark the style and approach for most of Horta's later town houses, including the Hôtel van Eetvelde, the Hôtel Solvay and the architect's own house and workshop. These houses were expensive to construct and only affordable by the haute-bourgeoisie. For this reason the pure architectural innovations were not largely followed by other architects. Most other Art Nouveau dwellings in Belgium and other European countries were inspired by Horta's whiplash decorative style, which is mostly applied to a more traditional building. The Hôtel Tassel had a decisive influence on the French Art Nouveau architect Hector Guimard, who later developed a personal interpretation of Horta's example.

As of 2017, the Hôtel Tassel was a private office.

== Exterior and façade ==
The building's exterior, namely the façade, is in itself an example of Art Nouveau. Horta implemented a number of different stylistic changes that distinguished the building from others at the time. These changes, however, all existed within the realm of Art Nouveau, and came from his selection of materials and the way that they all came together to form a building that exemplified the style as a whole. For example, the exterior is designed to be smooth and have a sense of fluidity.

Horta also diverged from typical architectural conventions by making the columns that dominate the front portion out of iron, as opposed to stone. These slender iron columns house a large bay window that furthers Horta's stylistic goals by creating a sense of openness and lightness to the building. Exposed rivets and framing methods, such as large brackets around the doors and windows create a sense of unity within the architecture. The organic acanthus set against the riveted iron beams that house the windows display Horta's desire to fuse nature and industry.

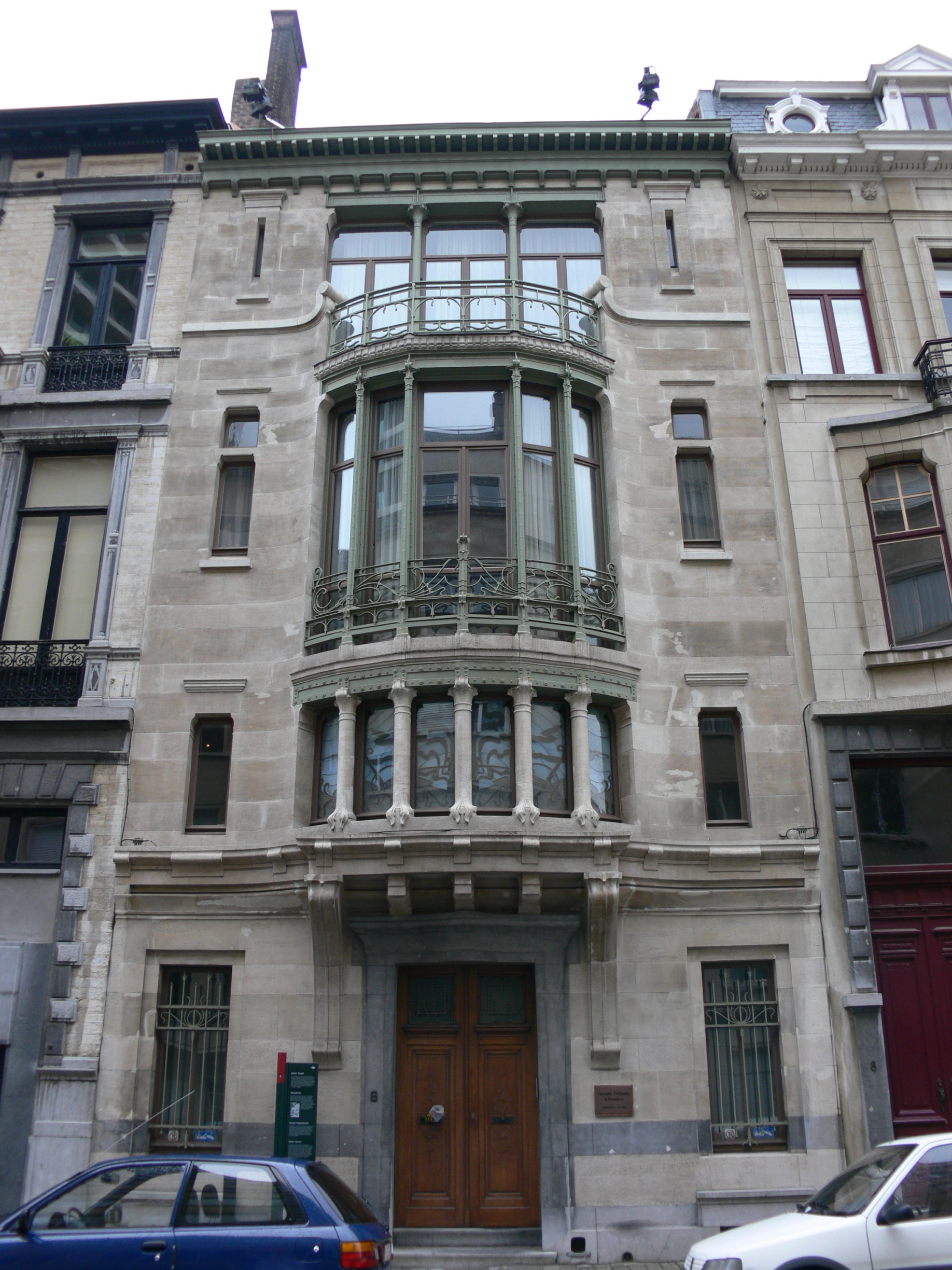
Façade

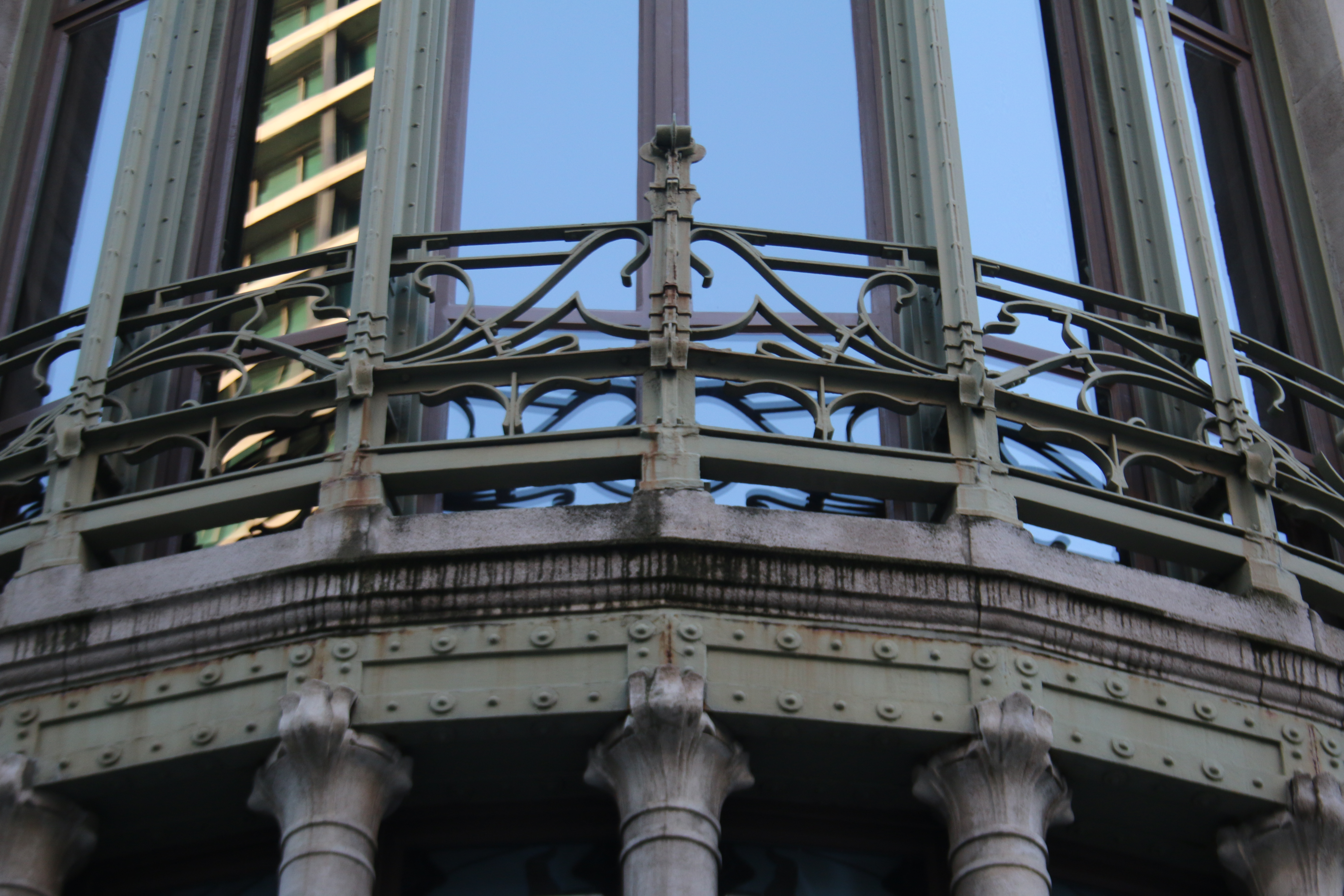
Wrought iron balcony

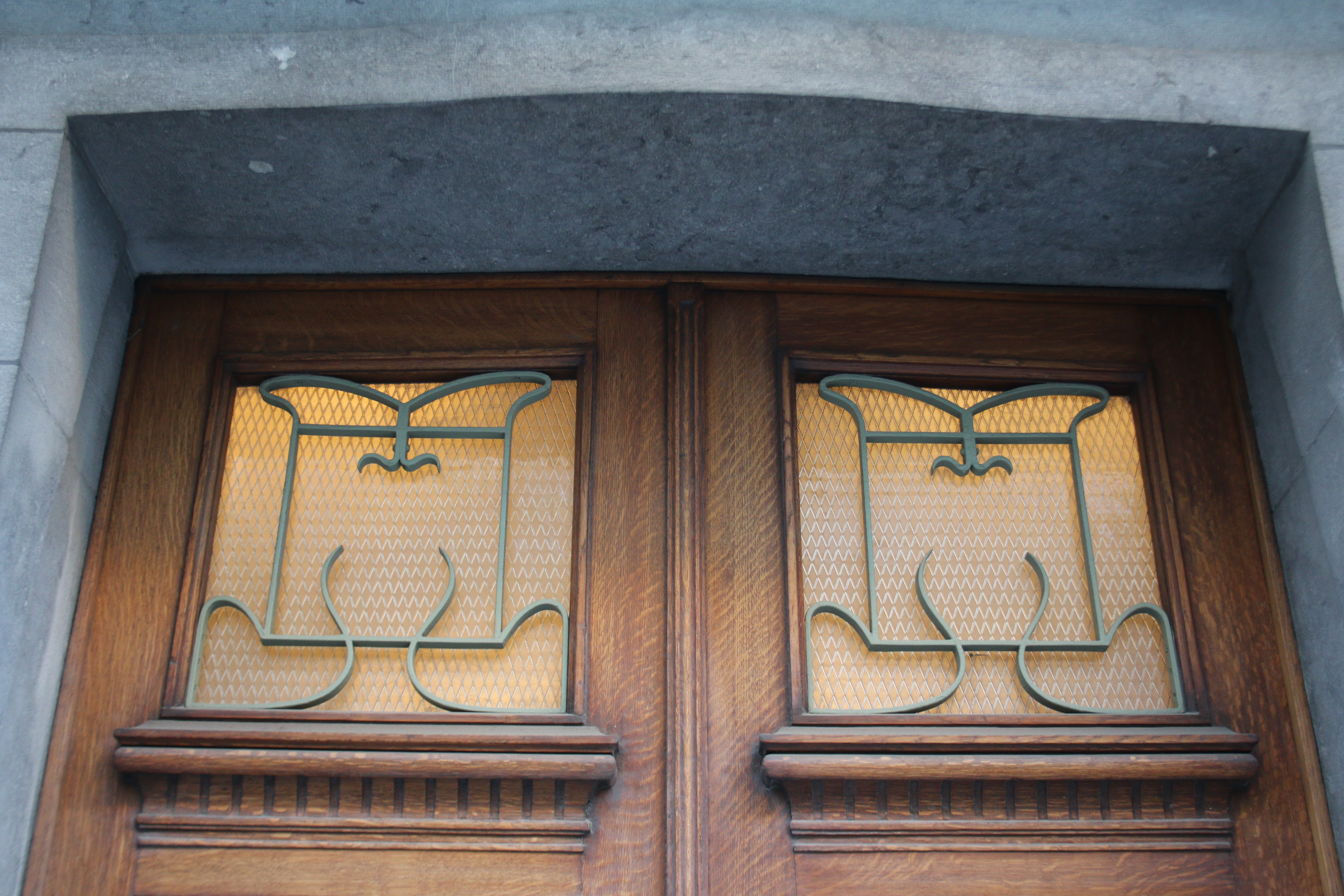
Entrance

== Interior ==
The interior is similarly notable as it features Horta's innovative open floor plan and use of natural light. Rooms in the town house were built around a central hall, which was fairly groundbreaking at the time. Materials used on the inside are purposefully visible and conform to the Art Nouveau style by being modelled after organic forms. The whole interior retains a cohesive sense of fluidity thanks to Horta's insistence on designing all of the interior elements.

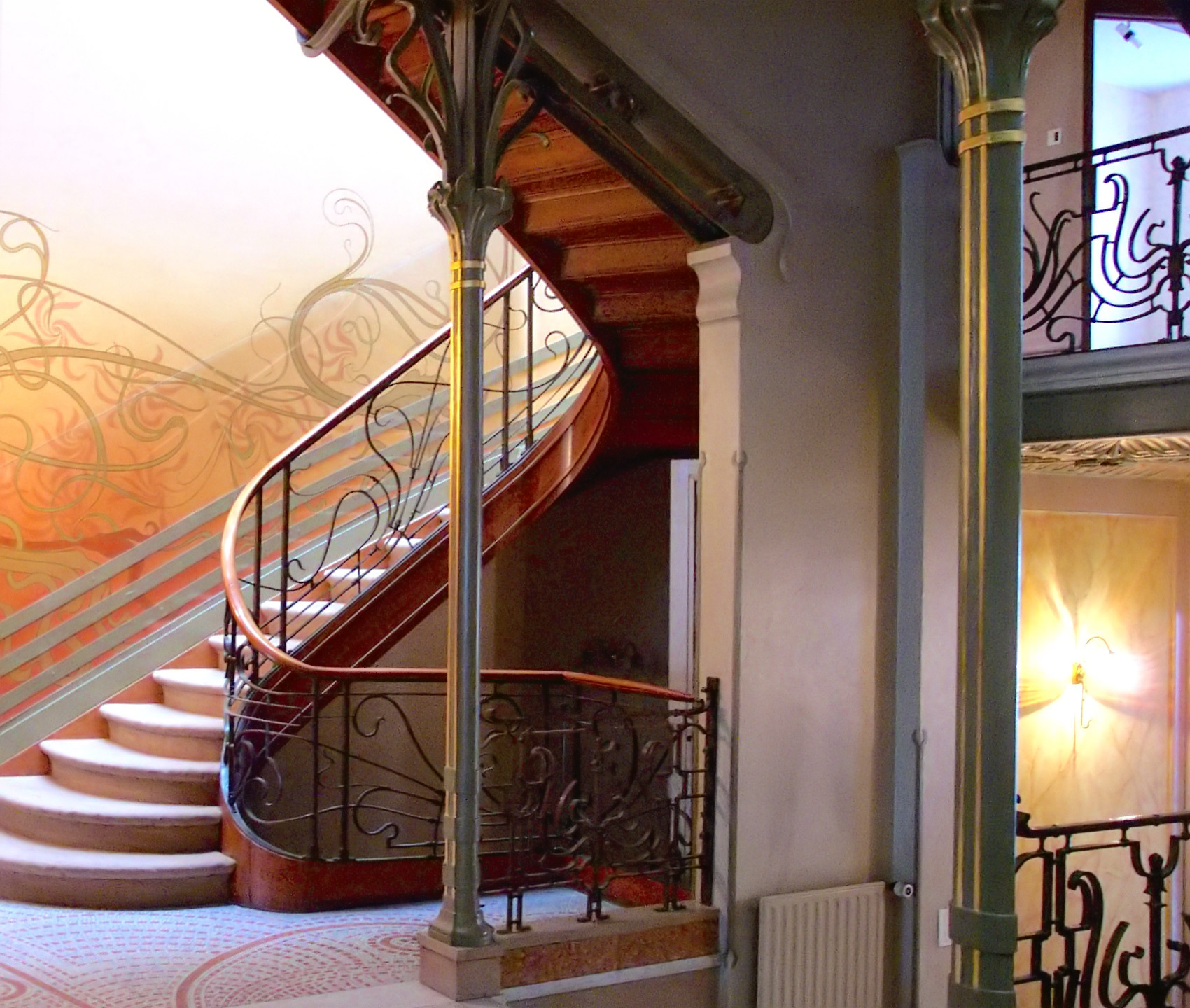
Stairway

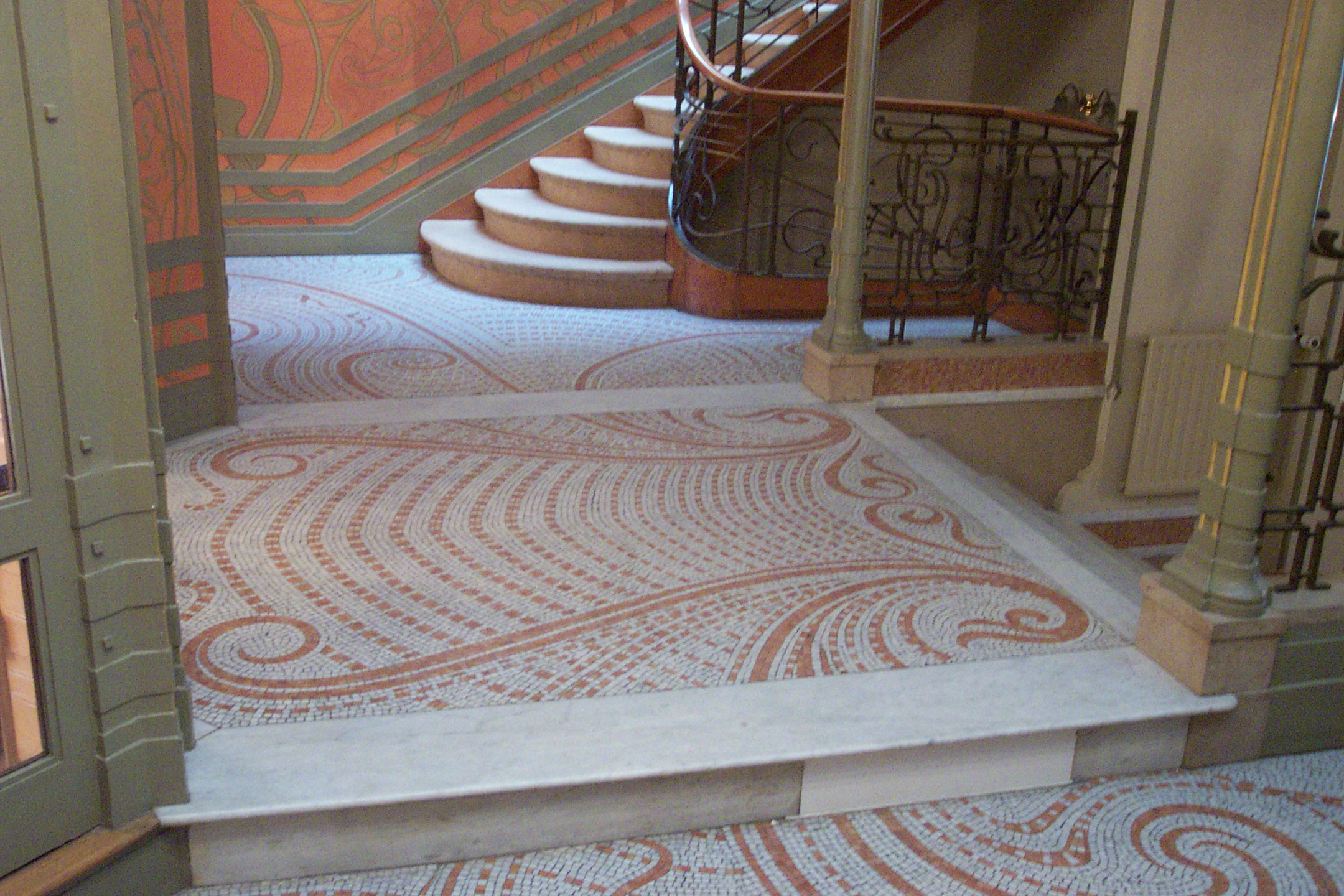
Mosaic floor with the characteristic whiplash curving lines

== Awards ==
The UNESCO commission recognised the Hôtel Tassel as UNESCO World Heritage in 2000, as part of the listing 'Major Town Houses of the Architect Victor Horta':

The four major town houses—Hôtel Tassel, Hôtel Solvay, Hôtel van Eetvelde, and Maison & Atelier Horta—located in Brussels and designed by the architect Victor Horta, one of the earliest initiators of Art Nouveau, are some of the most remarkable pioneering works of architecture of the end of the 19th century. The stylistic revolution represented by these works is characterised by their open plan, the diffusion of light, and the brilliant joining of the curved lines of decoration with the structure of the building.

== See also ==
- Art Nouveau in Brussels
- History of Brussels
- Culture of Belgium
- Belgium in the long nineteenth century
