= Hôtel van Eetvelde =

Historic Art Nouveau house and UNESCO World Heritage Site in Brussels, Belgium

- Hôtel van Eetvelde (French); Hotel van Eetvelde (Dutch)
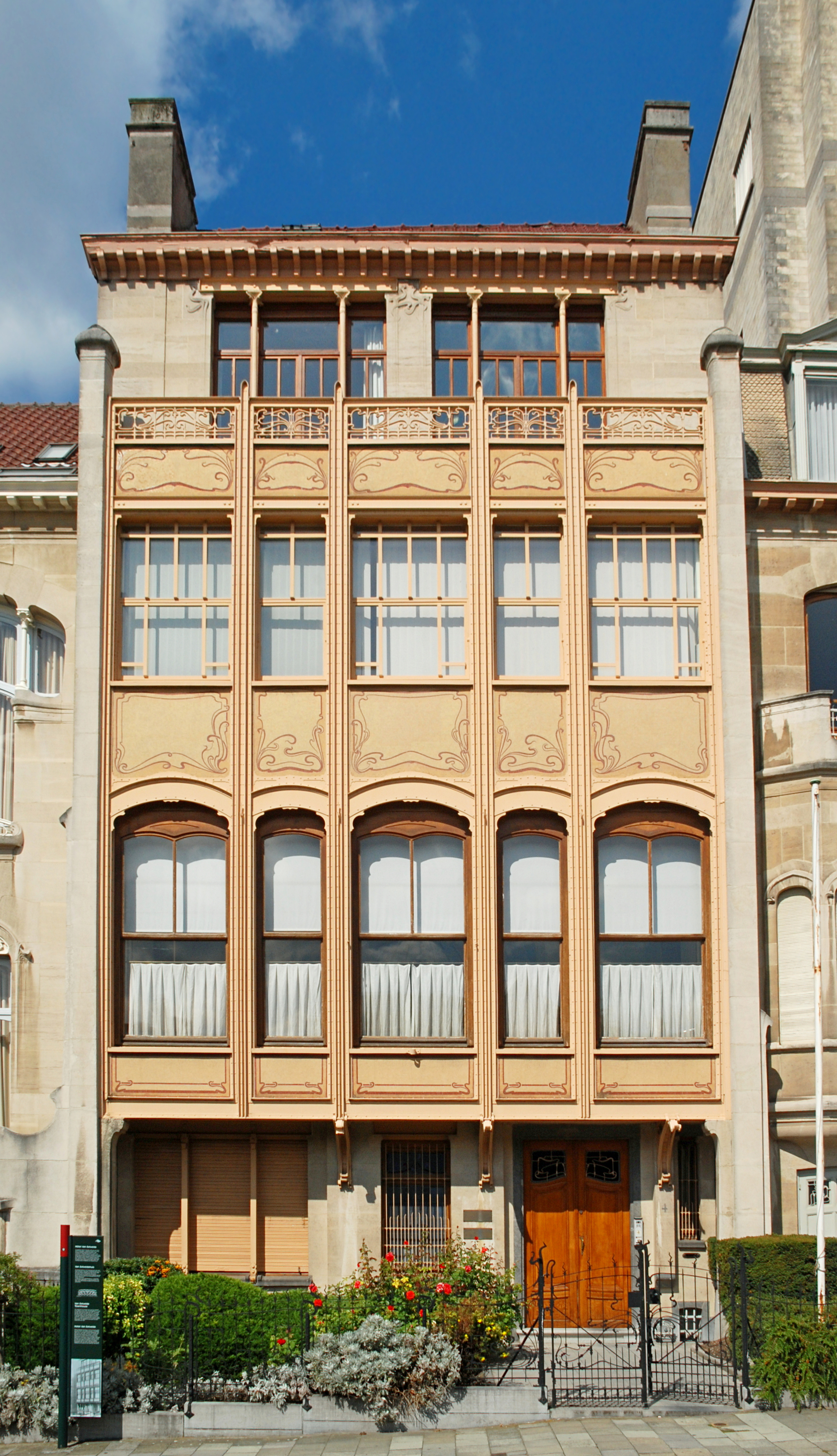
- Main façade of the Hôtel van Eetvelde
- Interactive map of the Hôtel van Eetvelde area

General information
- Type: Town house
- Architectural style: Art Nouveau
- Location: Avenue Palmerston / Palmerstonlaan 4, 1000 City of Brussels, Brussels-Capital Region, Belgium
- Coordinates: 50°50′49.94″N 4°22′50.11″E
- Construction started: 1895
- Completed: 1901
- Client: Edmond van Eetvelde
- Owner: Synergrid

Design and construction
- Architect: Victor Horta

UNESCO World Heritage Site
- Official name: Major Town Houses of the Architect Victor Horta (Brussels)
- Type: Cultural
- Criteria: i, ii, iv
- Designated: 2000 (24th session)
- Reference no.: 1005
- Region: Europe and North America

The Hôtel van Eetvelde (French: Hôtel van Eetvelde; Dutch: Hotel van Eetvelde) is a historic town house in Brussels, Belgium. It was designed by Victor Horta for Edmond van Eetvelde, administrator of Congo Free State, and built between 1895 and 1898, in Art Nouveau style. It is located at 4, avenue Palmerston/Palmerstonlaan in the Squares Quarter (eastern part of the City of Brussels). Two extensions, also designed by Horta, were added between 1898 and 1901.

Together with three other town houses of Victor Horta, including Horta's own house and workshop, it was added to the UNESCO World Heritage list in 2000 as the core of epoch-making urban residences that Horta designed before 1900.

== Building ==
=== Main building ===
The visible application of "industrial" materials, such as steel and glass, was a novel for prestigious private dwellings at the time. In the Hôtel van Eetvelde, Victor Horta also used a hanging steel construction for the façade. The interior receives additional lighting through a central reception room covered by a stained glass cupola.

The Hotel van Eetvelde in Brussels was designed in 1898[sic] by Victor Horta, undoubtedly the key European Art Nouveau architect. While most other architects flirted with the new style, Horta found it gave the best expression to his ideas. His skill is demonstrated in his ability to slip his domestic designs into narrow constricted sites. The interiors become of great importance as centres of light, which permeates through the filigree domes and skylights—usually in the centre of the building. The Hotel van Eetvelde is a remarkable example of the way Horta handled the situation and used it to highlight the imposing staircase, which leads up to the first-floor reception rooms.

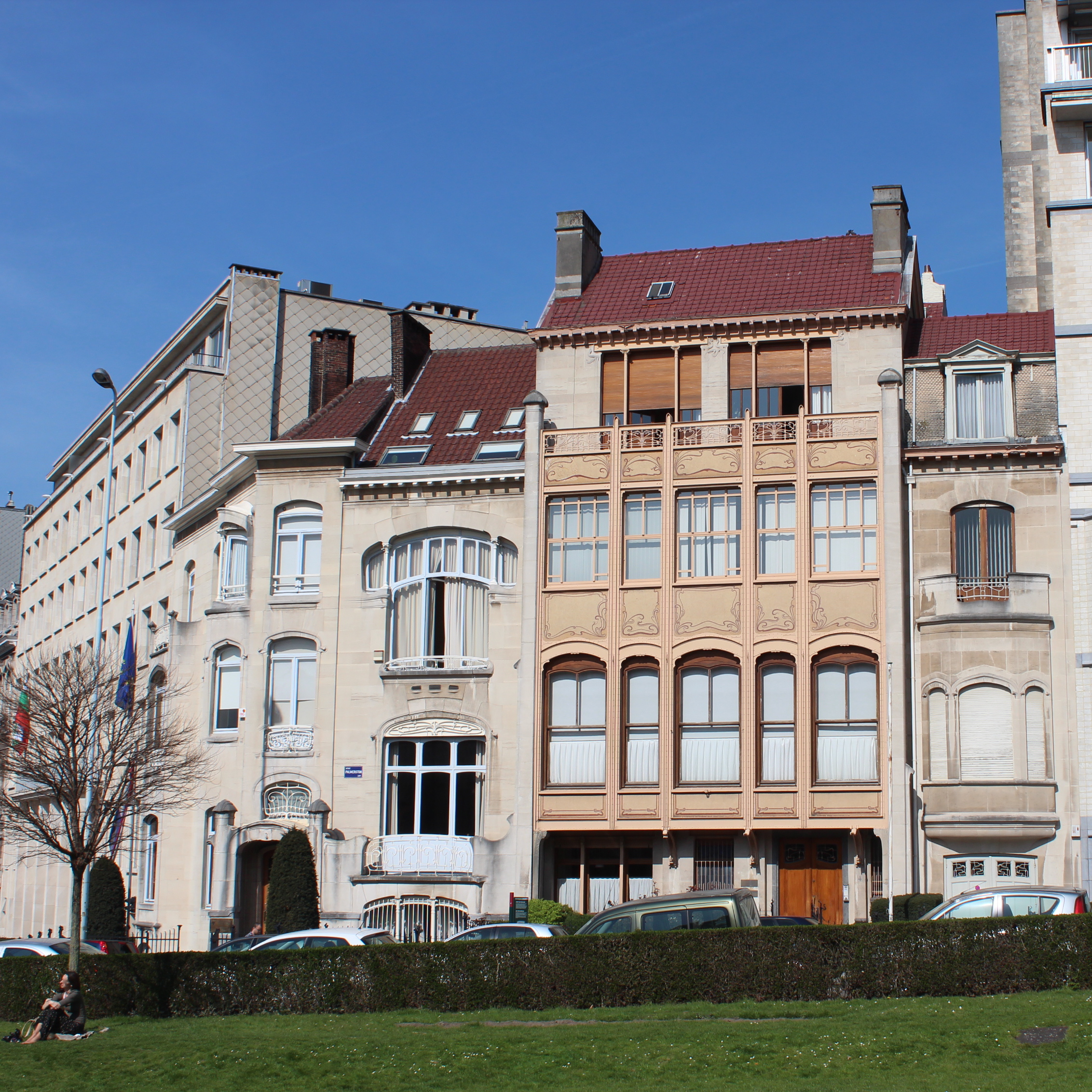
General view

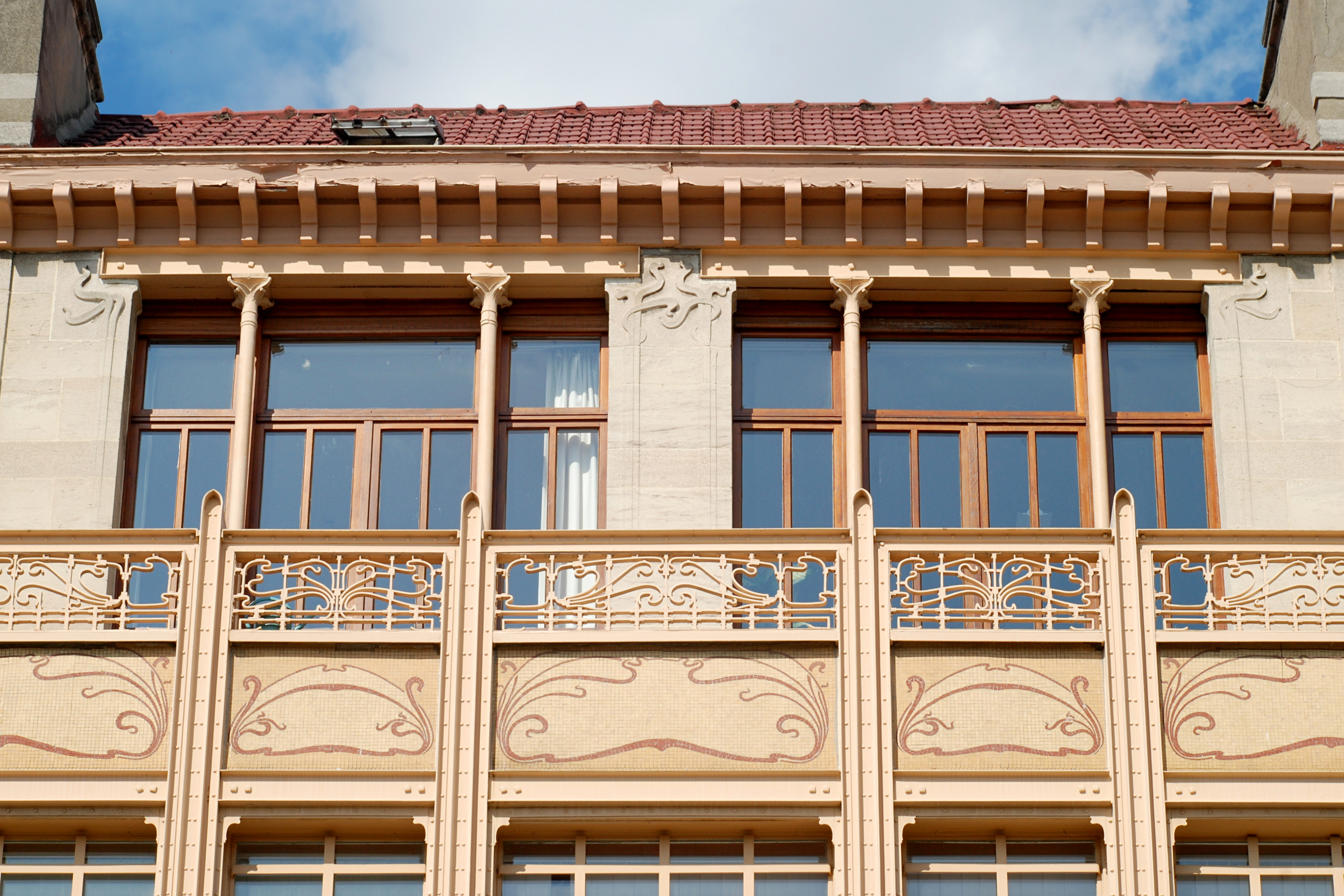
Upper part of the main façade

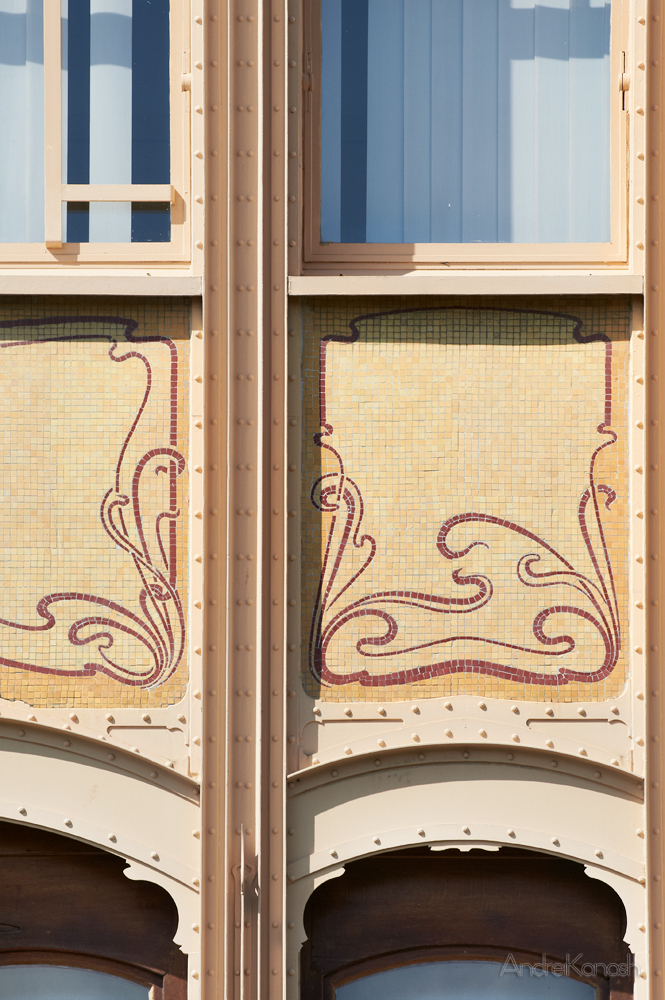
Panel of mosaics

=== Extensions ===
A first extension to the house was designed by Horta in 1898. This building has a more conventional, beautifully detailed, sandstone façade. It was designed to house a garage, an office for van Eetvelde, as well as supporting apartments, and therefore had a separate entrance at 2, avenue Palmerston/Palmerstonlaan. This house later became the home of the architect Jean Delhaye, a collaborator of Horta, who became, after the latter's death, the great defender of his work.

In 1901, Horta added a second extension to the house, on the other side this time, on half of a plot acquired by van Eetvelde, who directly sold the other half to his neighbour.

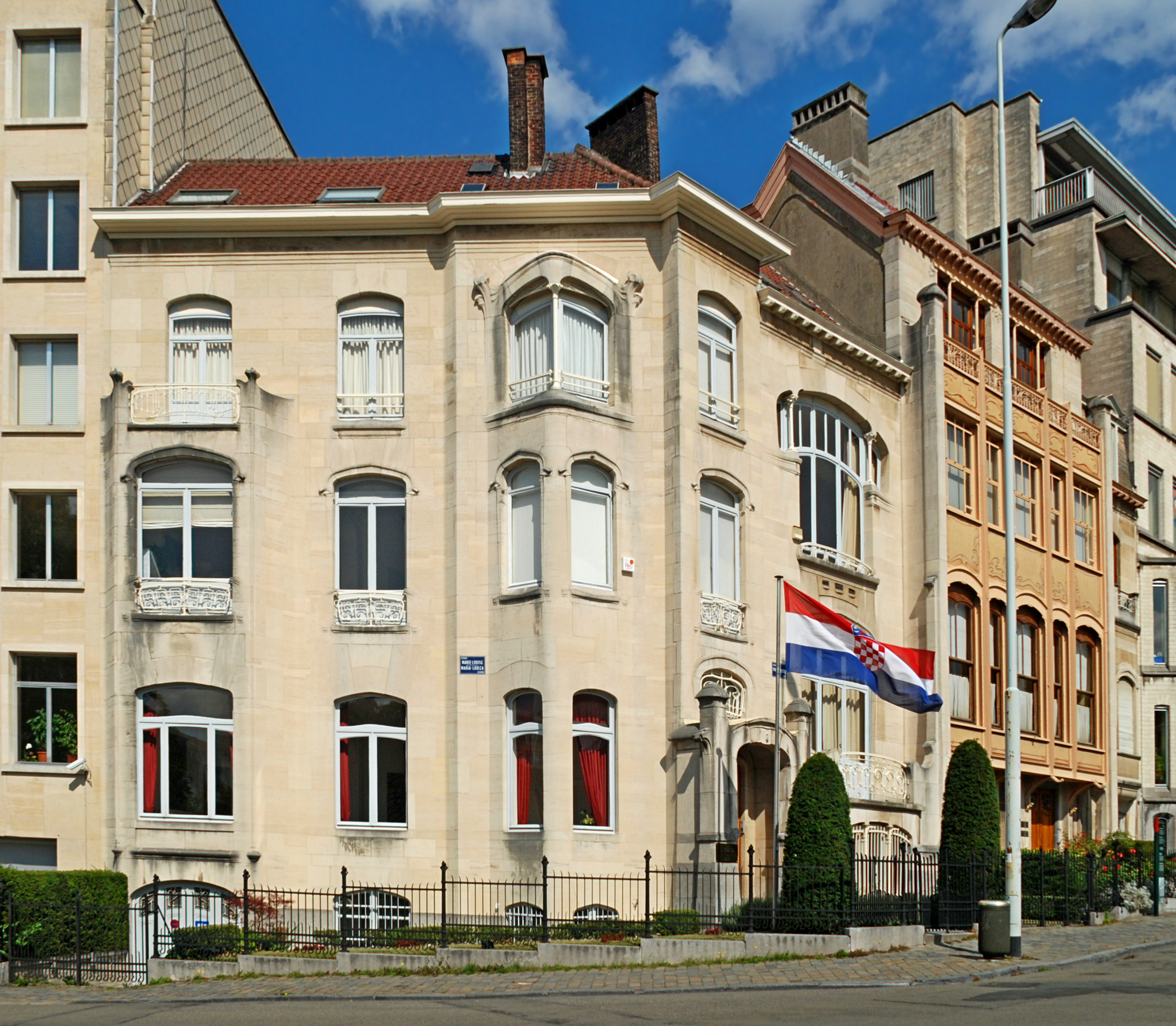
The first extension at 2, avenue Palmerston/Palmerstonlaan

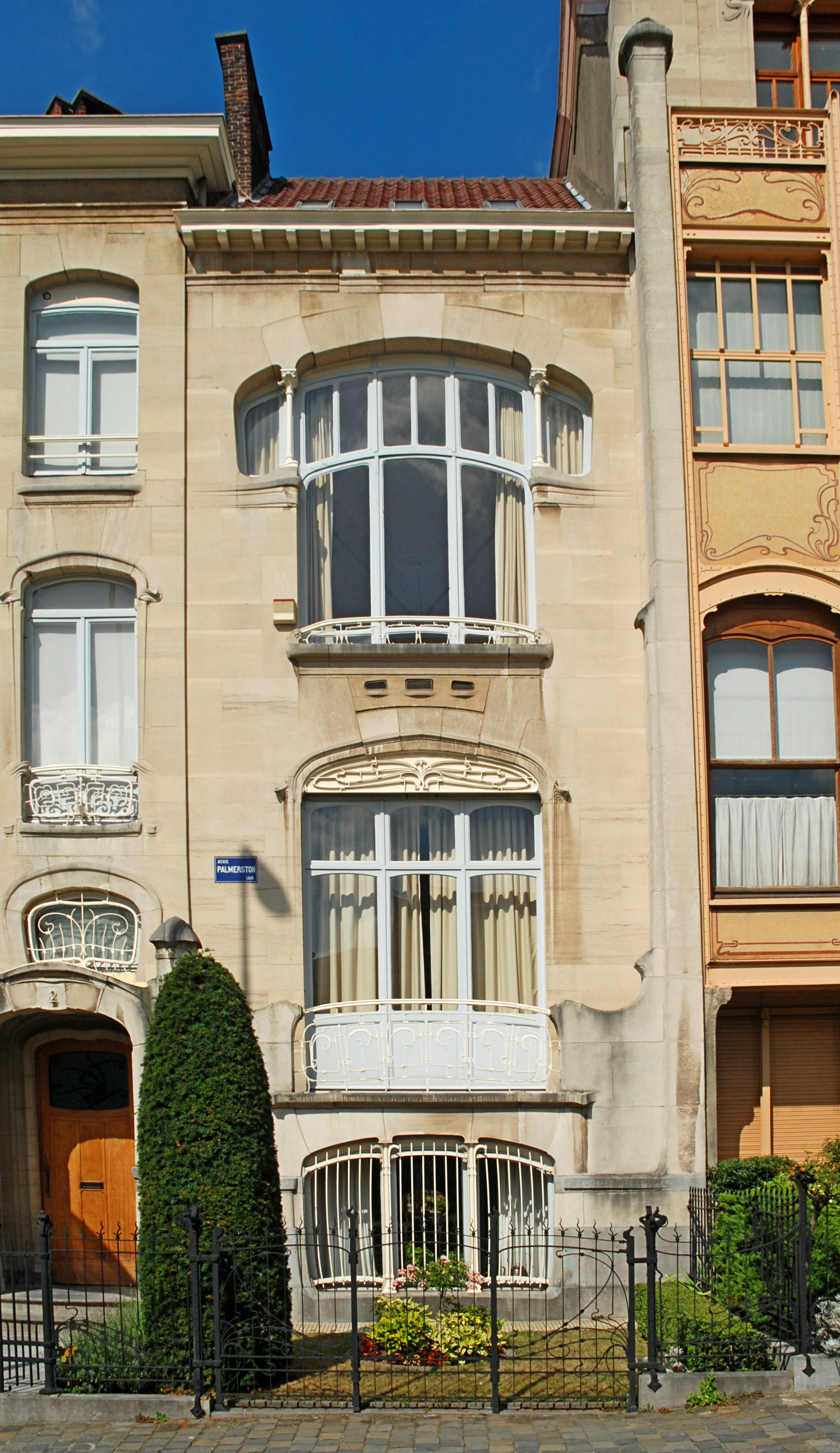
Eastern façade of the first extension

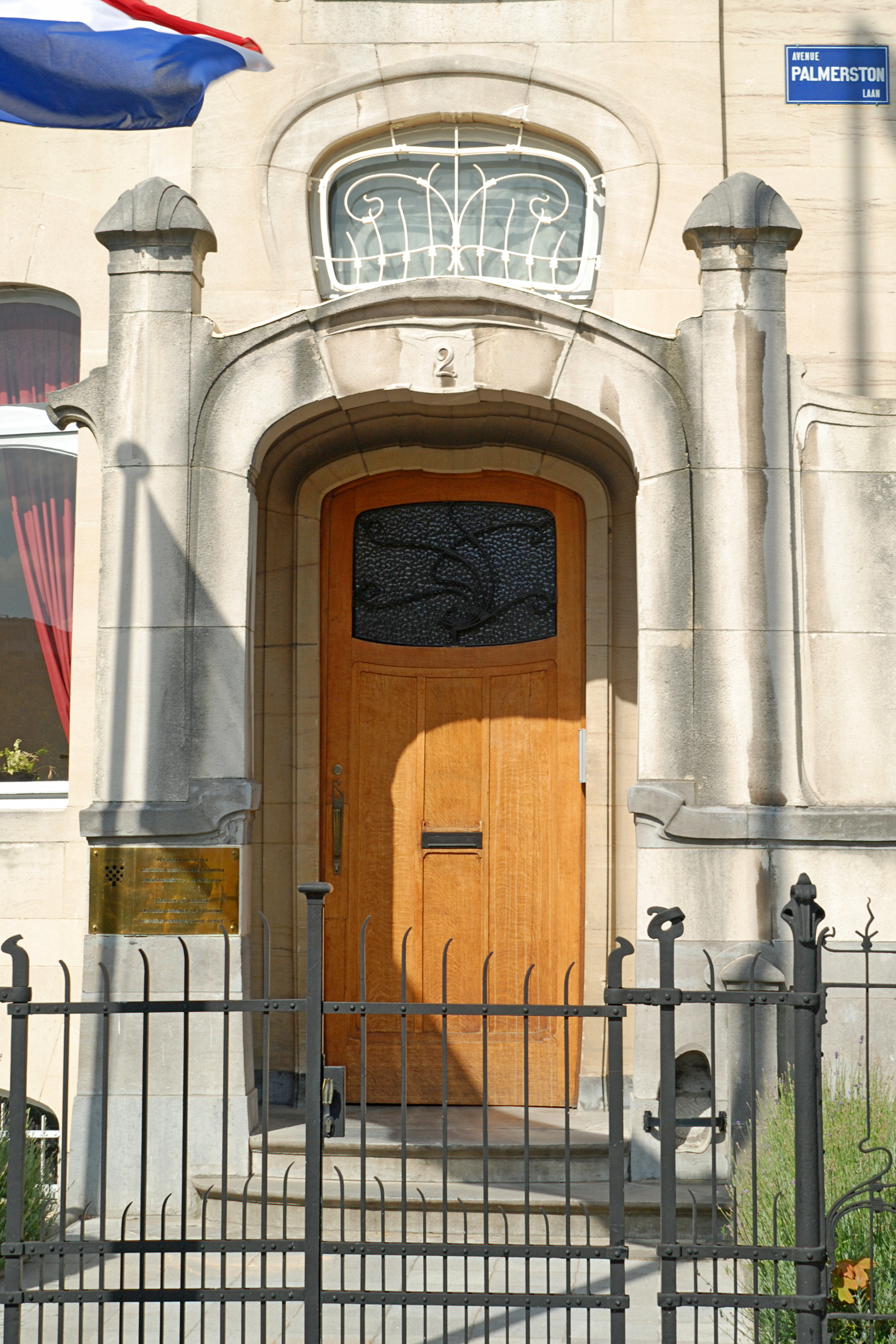
Entrance of the first extension

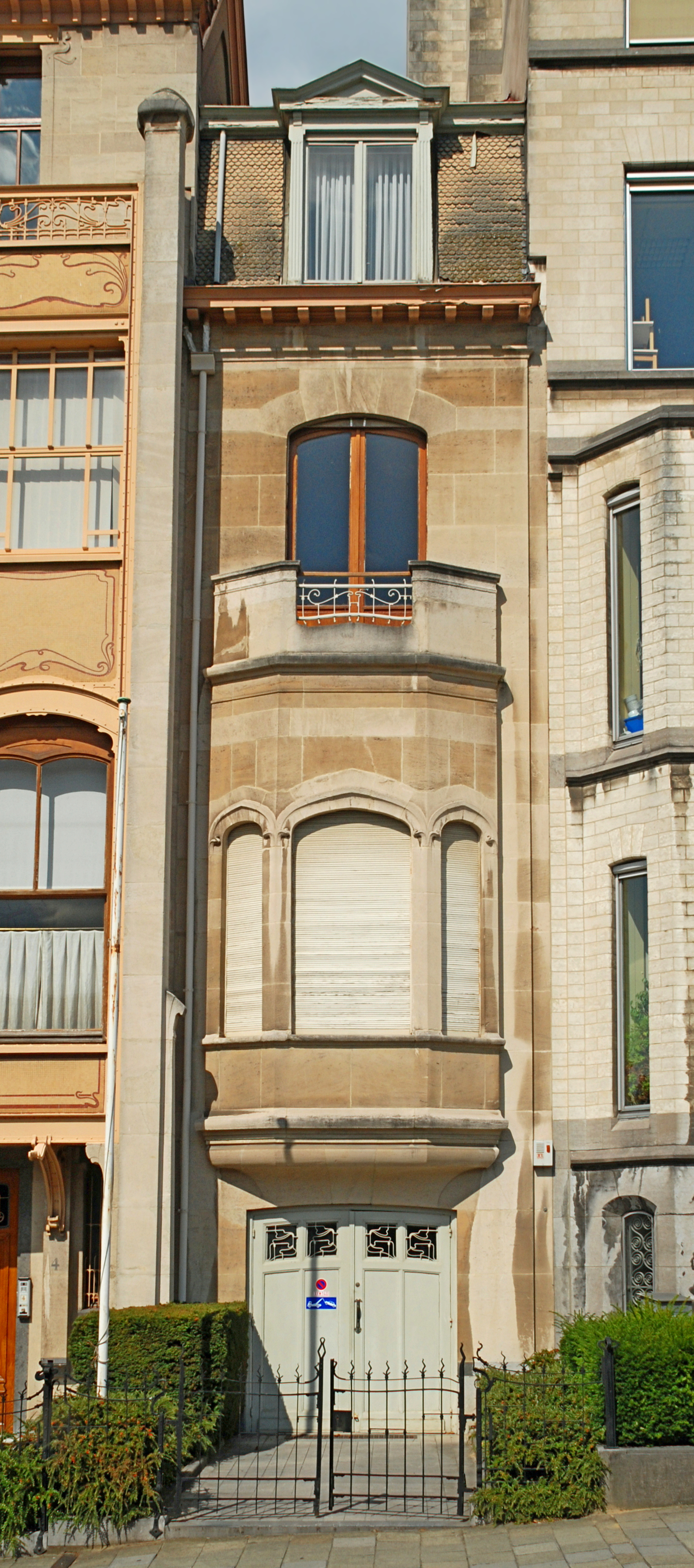
The second extension

== Interior ==
The interior of the central building revolves around an octagonal rotunda surmounted by a skylight. This rotunda and its glass roof were reconstructed in 1988, as they were originally designed by Horta.

Horta combined here a rest area and a movement area; the rotunda has the function of a small living room or Winter Garden, but it is surrounded by a circulation area that provides the connection with the living room, the dining room and stairwell.

The cupola with its coloured stained glass windows is supported by eight steel columns, which "are integrated into this vegetal world like rods". The dining room door is adorned with opalescent glass whose tint changes according to the intensity and incidence of light.

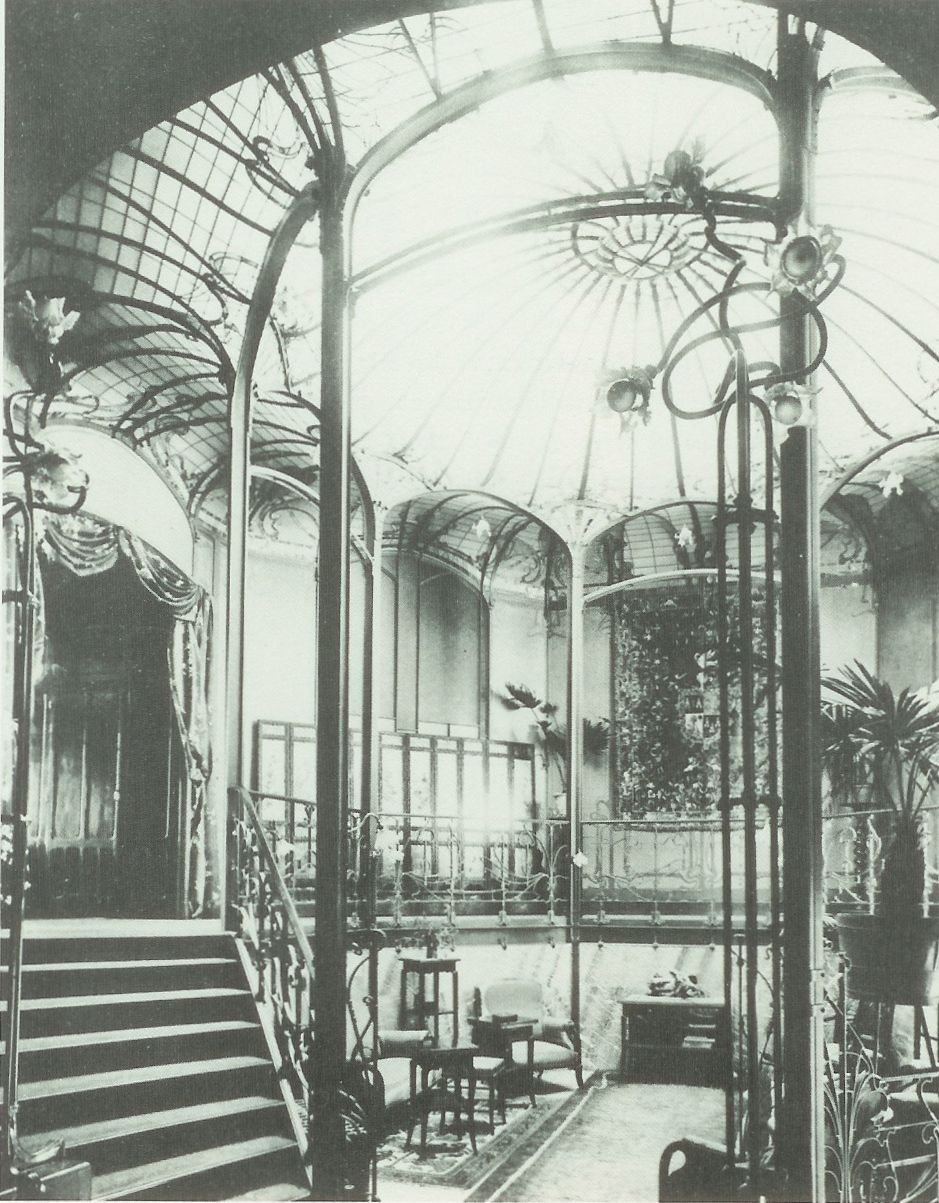
The Winter Garden

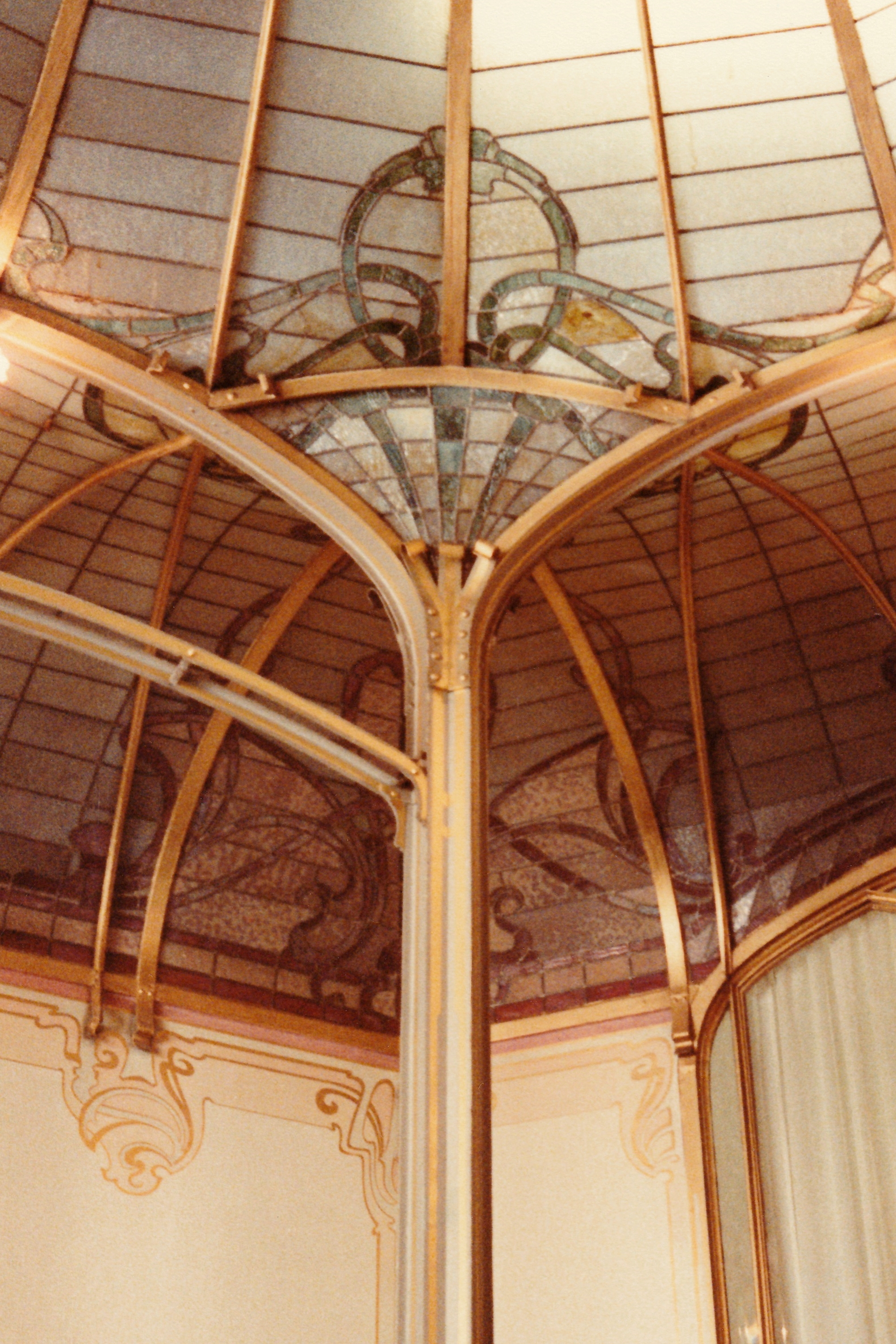
Detail of the Winter Garden

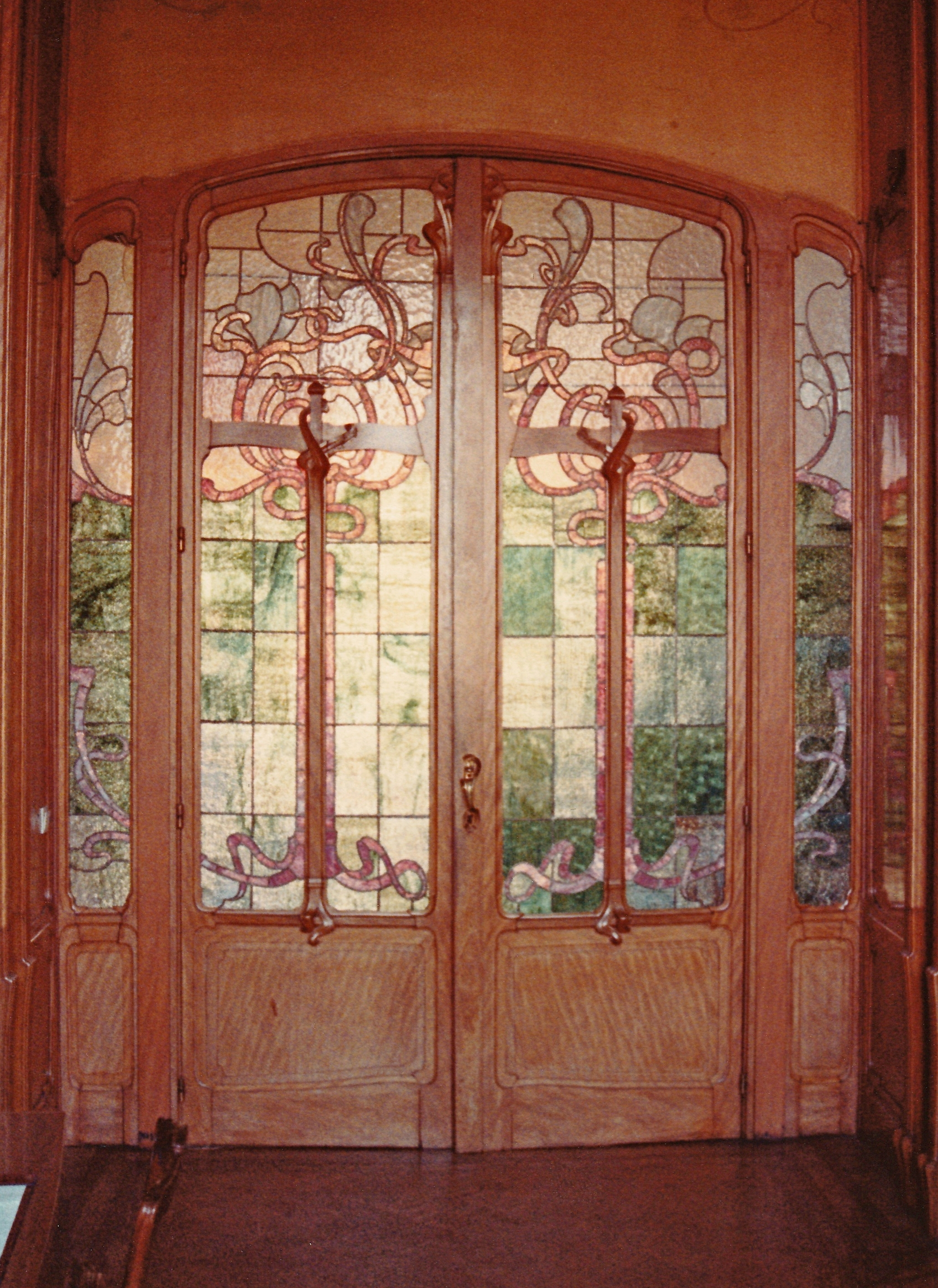
Doorway with stained glass

== Awards ==
The UNESCO commission recognised the Hôtel van Eetvelde as UNESCO World Heritage in 2000, as part of the listing 'Major Town Houses of the Architect Victor Horta':

The four major town houses—Hôtel Tassel, Hôtel Solvay, Hôtel van Eetvelde, and Maison & Atelier Horta—located in Brussels and designed by the architect Victor Horta, one of the earliest initiators of Art Nouveau, are some of the most remarkable pioneering works of architecture of the end of the 19th century. The stylistic revolution represented by these works is characterised by their open plan, the diffusion of light, and the brilliant joining of the curved lines of decoration with the structure of the building.

== See also ==
- Art Nouveau in Brussels
- History of Brussels
- Culture of Belgium
- Belgium in the long nineteenth century
