= Horta Museum =

Historic Art Nouveau house and UNESCO World Heritage Site in Brussels, Belgium

- Musée Horta (French); Hortamuseum (Dutch)
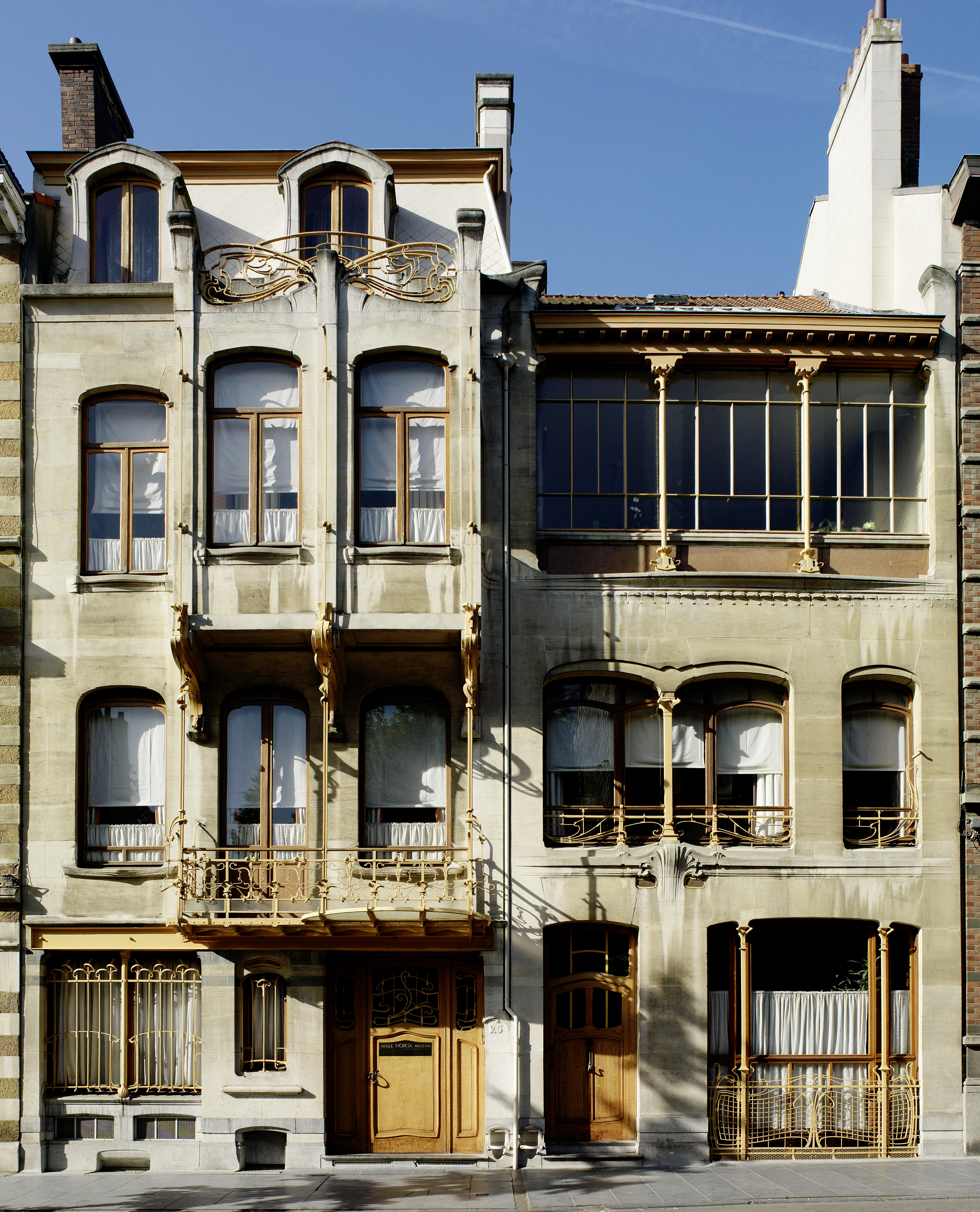
- Main façade of the Horta Museum

General information
- Type: Town house and workshop
- Architectural style: Art Nouveau
- Location: Rue Américaine / Amerikaansestraat 23–25, 1060 Saint-Gilles, Brussels-Capital Region, Belgium
- Coordinates: 50°49′27″N 4°21′17″E
- Construction started: 1898
- Completed: 1901
- Client: Victor Horta

Design and construction
- Architect: Victor Horta

Website
- www.hortamuseum.be

UNESCO World Heritage Site
- Official name: Major Town Houses of the Architect Victor Horta (Brussels)
- Type: Cultural
- Criteria: i, ii, iv
- Designated: 2000 (24th session)
- Reference no.: 1005
- Region: Europe and North America

The Horta Museum (French: Musée Horta; Dutch: Hortamuseum) is a museum in Brussels, Belgium, dedicated to the life and work of the architect Victor Horta and his time. The museum is housed in Horta's former town house and workshop (French: Maison et Atelier Horta; Dutch: Woning en Atelier Horta), built between 1898 and 1901, in Art Nouveau style. It is located at 23–25, rue Américaine/Amerikaansestraat in the municipality of Saint-Gilles.

Together with three other town houses of Victor Horta, it was added to the UNESCO World Heritage list in 2000 as the core of epoch-making urban residences that Horta designed before 1900.

== Architecture ==
The town house was designed by Victor Horta, and served as his workshop and living space. Horta was known for his significant role in defining the Art Nouveau style. His town house designs were a thoughtfully arranged, tight sequence of spaces specifically suited to his upper class clients.

The exterior of the Horta Museum features an asymmetrical arrangement of delicate ironwork that follows the building's projecting and recessed sections. Various window styles are arranged freely across the façade. Through these design elements, Horta created a highly personal and expressive architectural façade.

Housed in the Art Nouveau interiors is a permanent display of furniture, utensils and art objects designed by Horta and his contemporaries, as well as documents related to his life and time. The museum organises temporary exhibitions on topics related to Horta and his art. The interior also holds features such as light fixtures, door handles, and coat hooks, each designed specifically for the project in the Art Nouveau style.

The interior decoration utilises many different materials and techniques. Horta left the structure exposed in parts of the house, which was an intentional decision made because iron was not commonly used as a structural material in Europe at the time. The stairwell is lined with iron banisters, leading up to an arching stained-glass skylight. Leaded glass was used for the skylight and door panels on the front door. The walls lining the staircase hold one of the largest examples of sgraffito in Europe. Other parts of the house were decorated using a variety of techniques such as mosaic tiling, fresco, and wallpaper. Wood elements for the interior were richly carved, and left natural to emphasise the quality of the wood.

== Awards ==
The UNESCO commission recognised the Horta Museum as UNESCO World Heritage in 2000, as part of the listing 'Major Town Houses of the Architect Victor Horta':

The four major town houses—Hôtel Tassel, Hôtel Solvay, Hôtel van Eetvelde, and Maison & Atelier Horta—located in Brussels and designed by the architect Victor Horta, one of the earliest initiators of Art Nouveau, are some of the most remarkable pioneering works of architecture of the end of the 19th century. The stylistic revolution represented by these works is characterised by their open plan, the diffusion of light, and the brilliant joining of the curved lines of decoration with the structure of the building.

An extensive restoration project was completed in 2013. In 2014, it won the European Union Prize for Cultural Heritage / Europa Nostra Award.

== Gallery ==
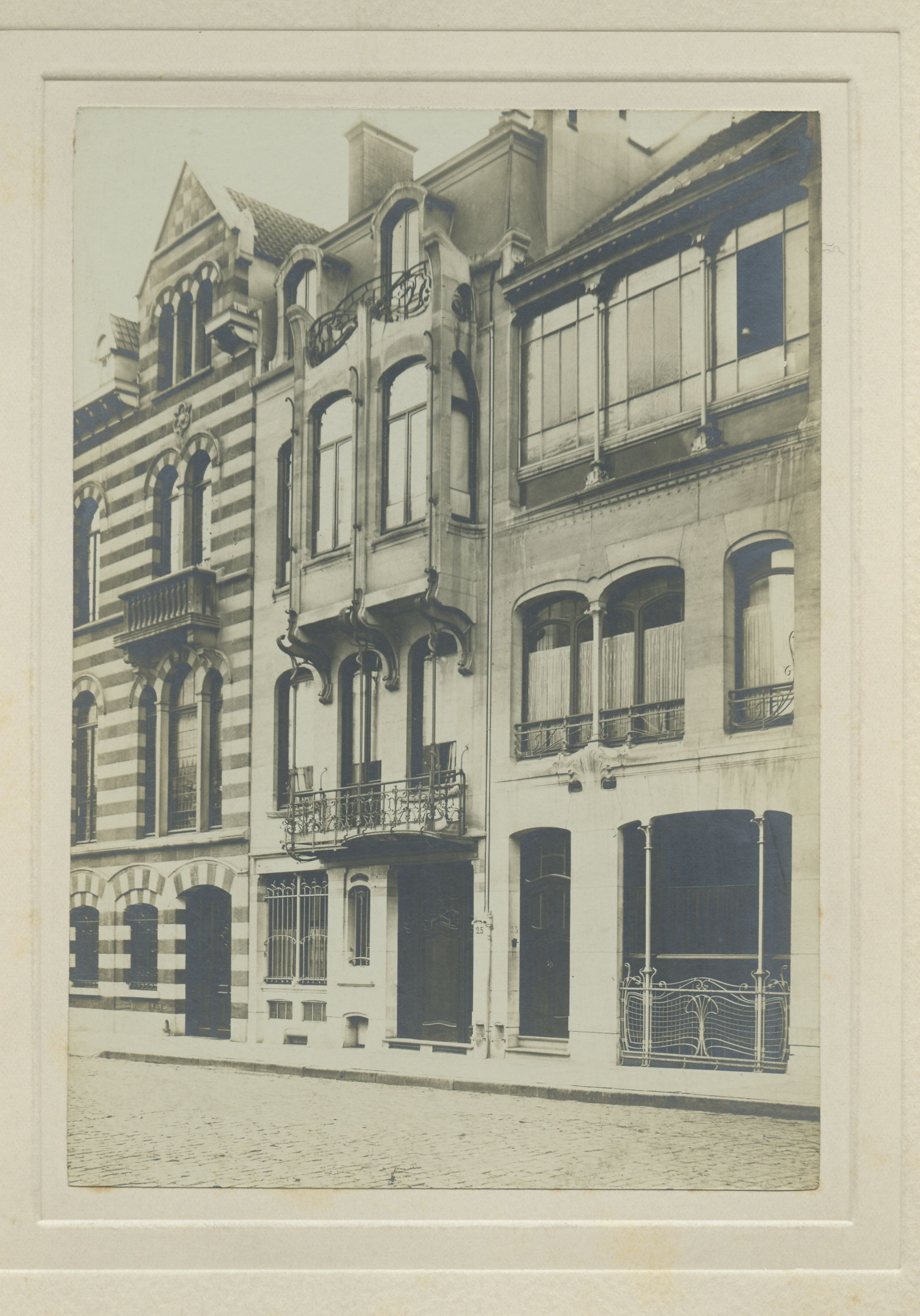
Horta's house and workshop in the early 20th century

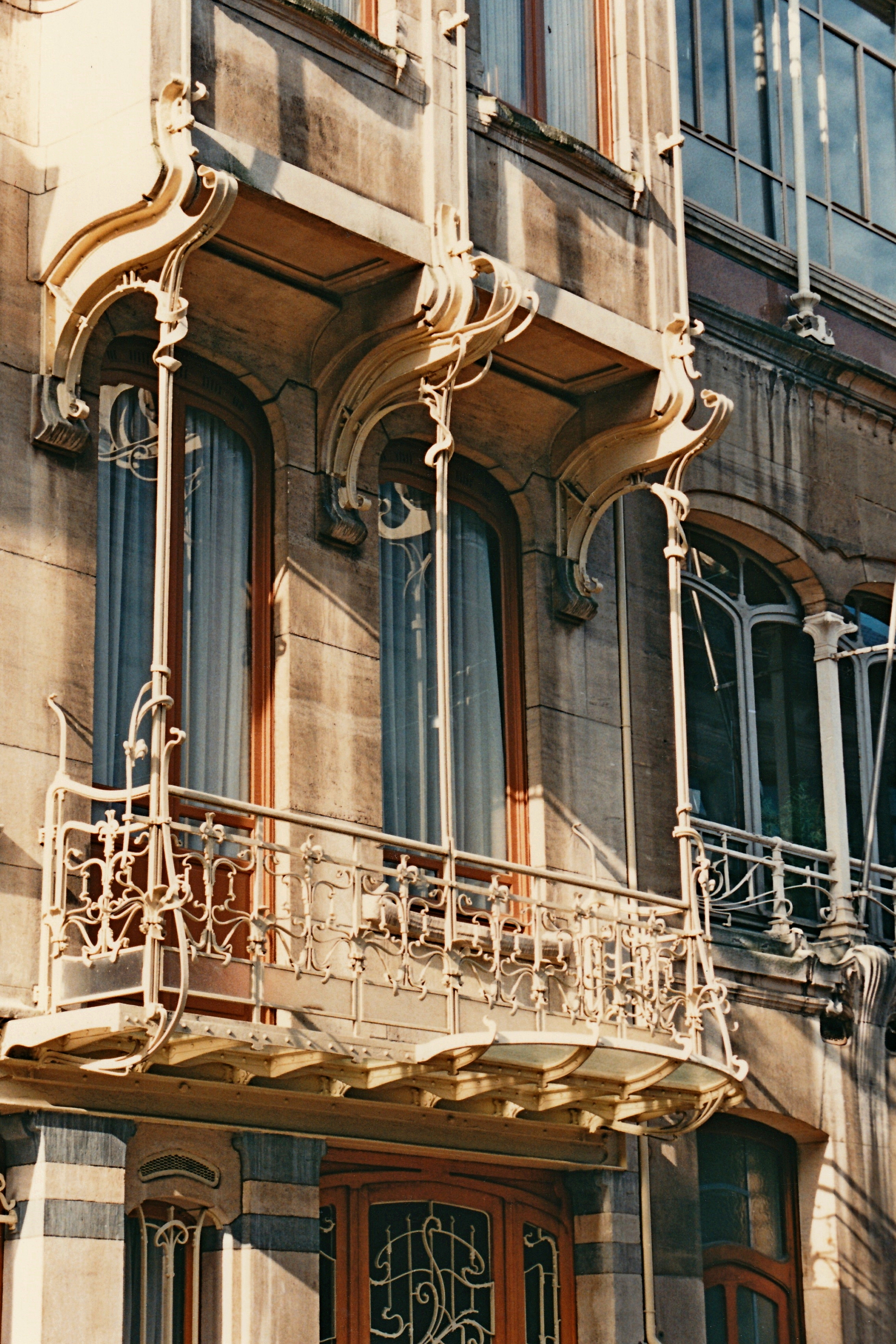
The balcony

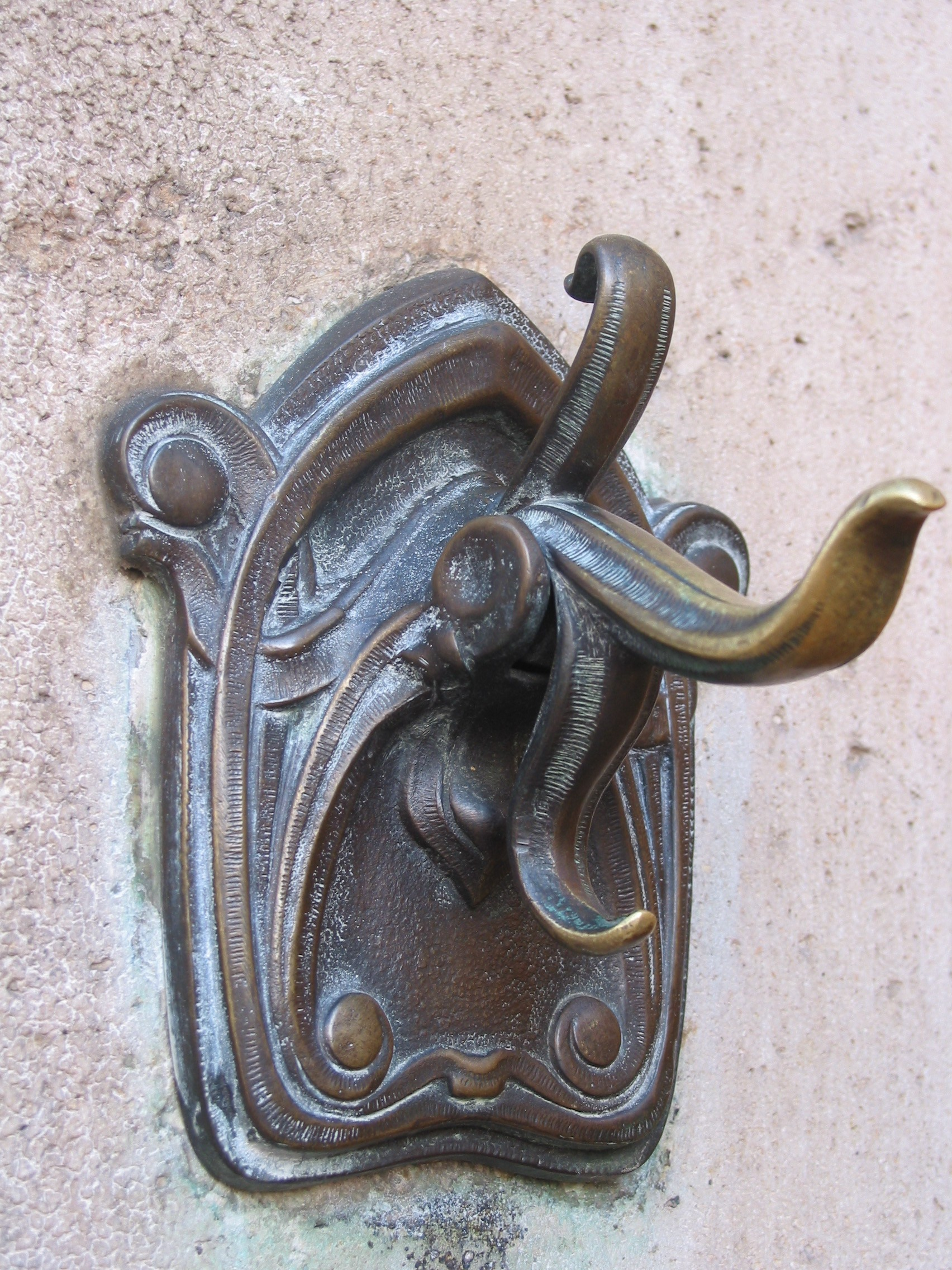
Doorbell

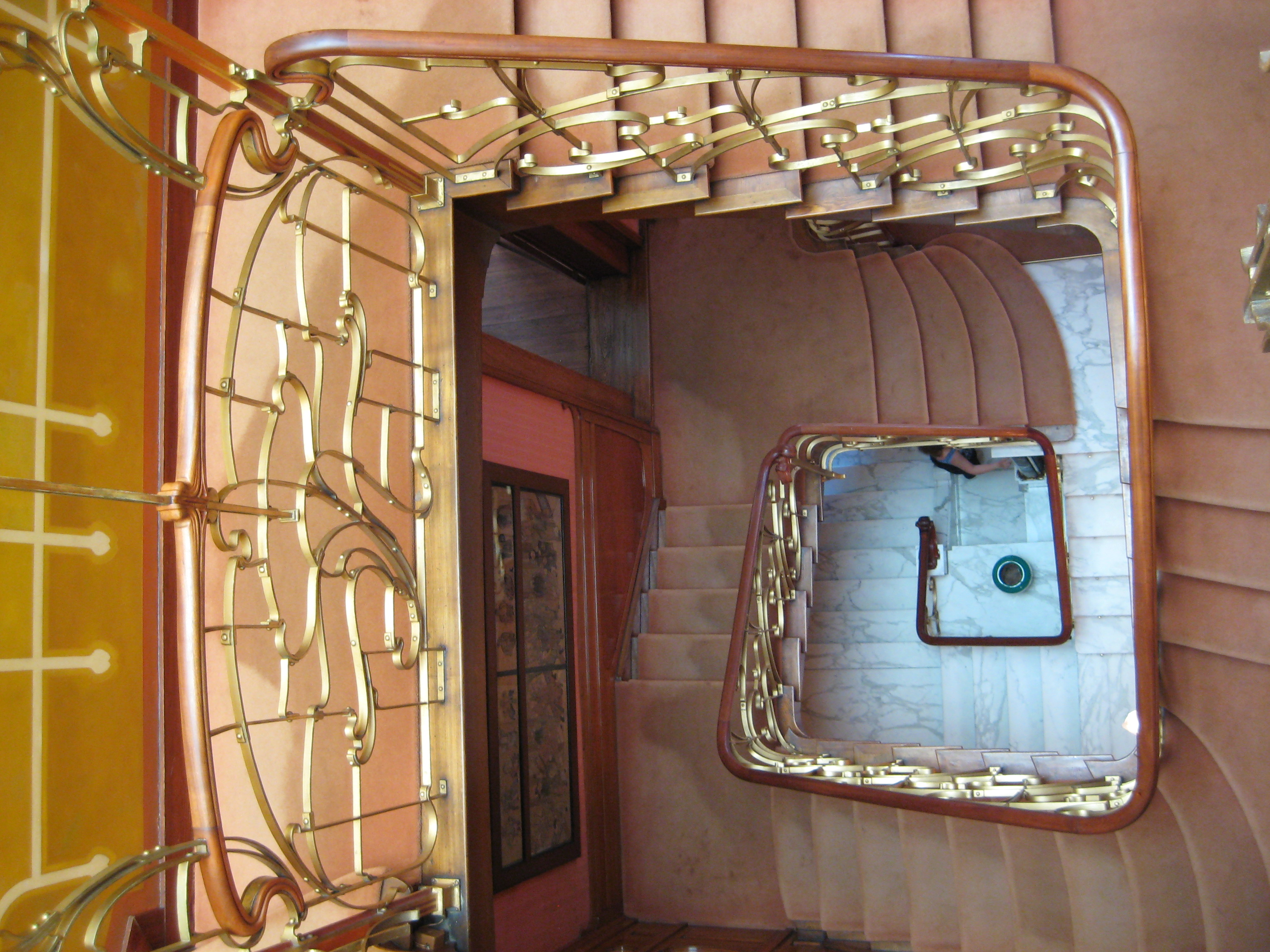
Spiral staircase

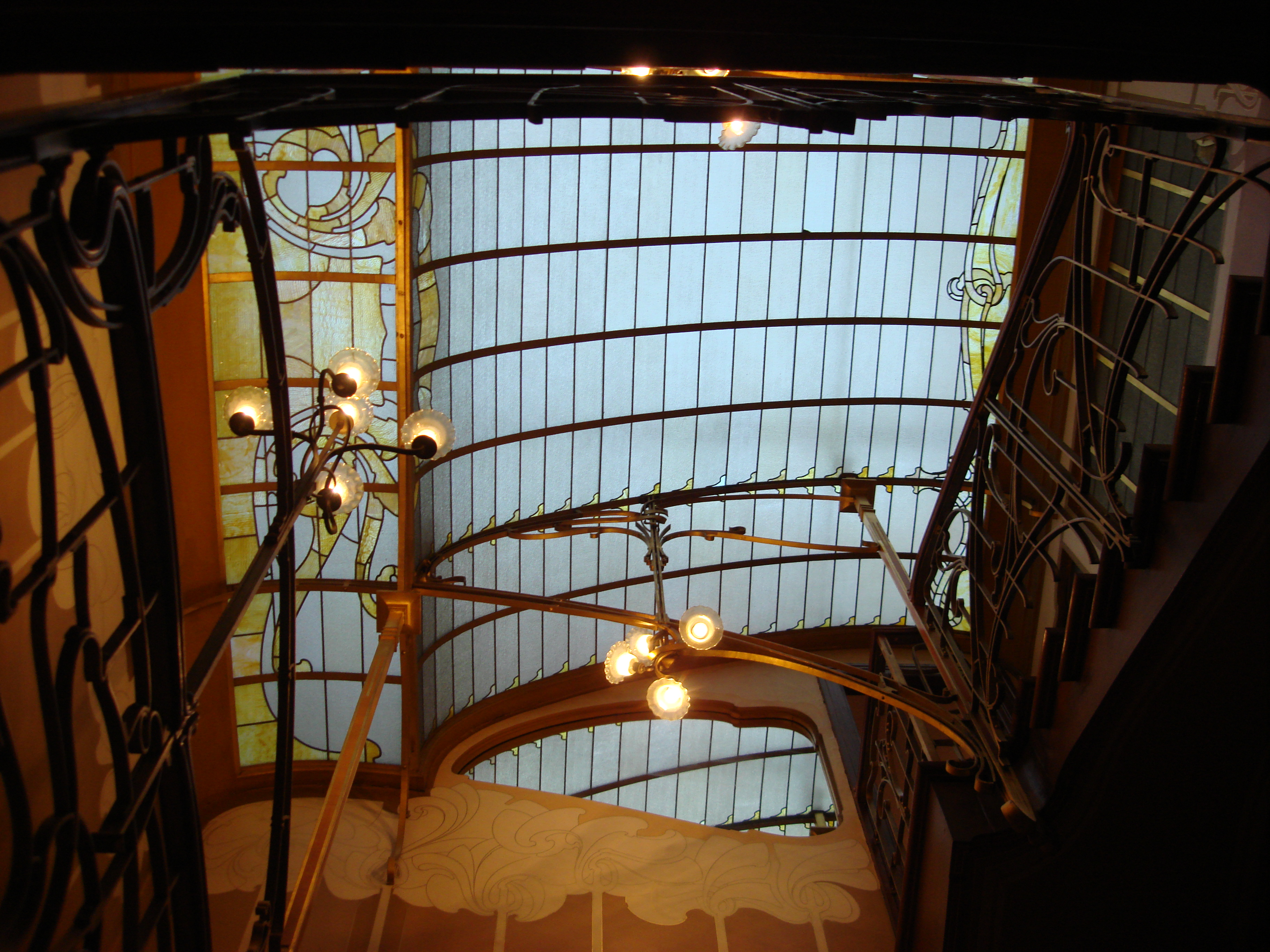
Skylight above the stairway

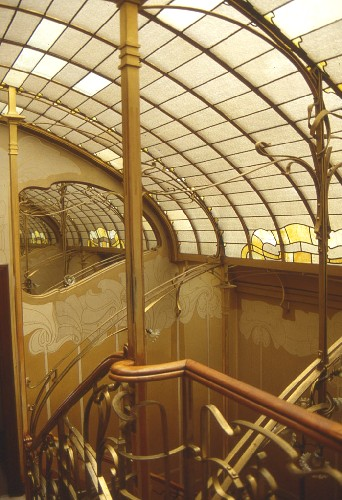
Closeup of the skylight

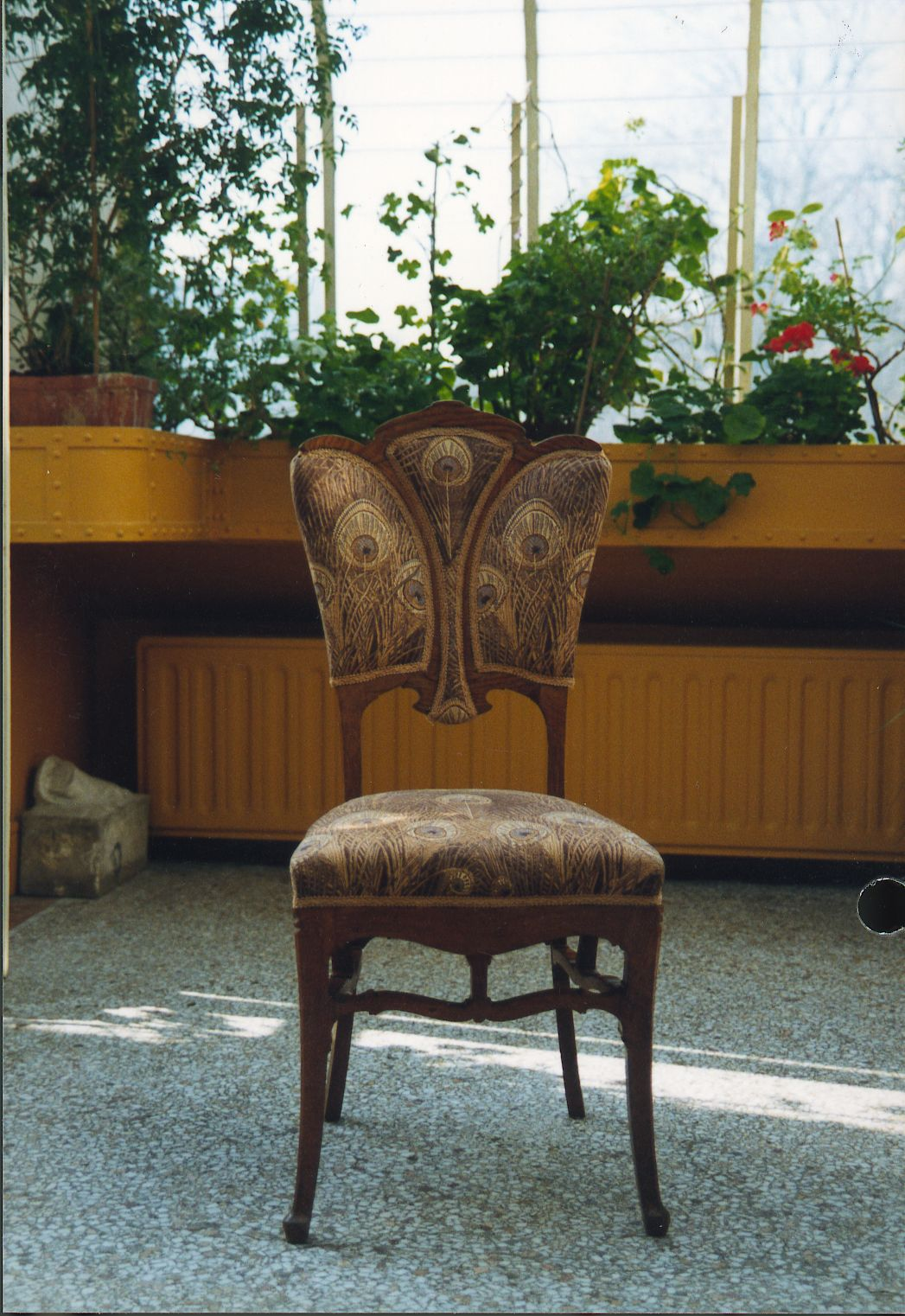
Peacock Chair by Horta from either the Hôtel Tassel or the Castle of La Hulpe

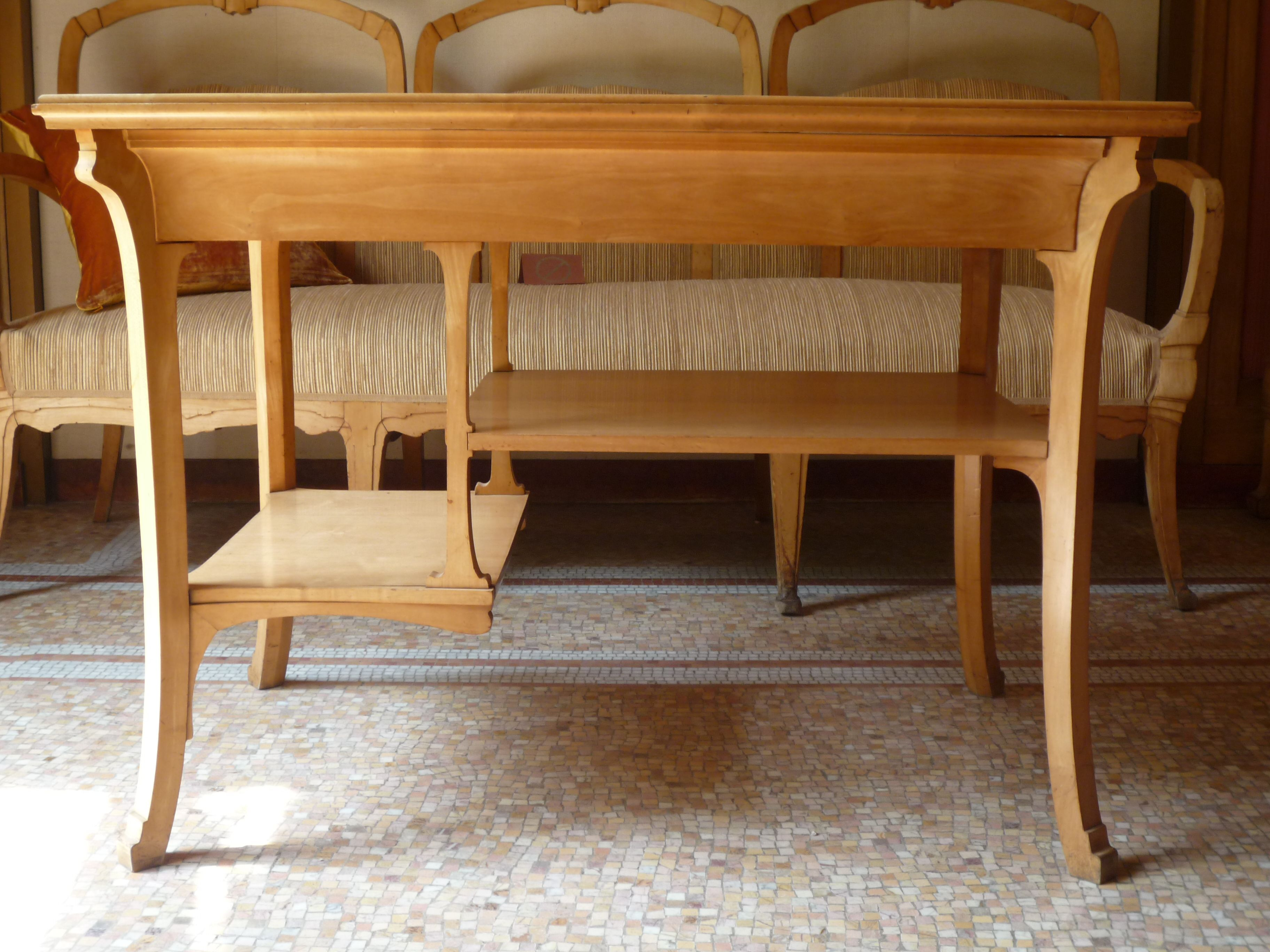
Table by Horta, probably designed for the 1902 Turin International Exposition

== See also ==
- List of museums in Brussels
- Art Nouveau in Brussels
- History of Brussels
- Culture of Belgium
- Belgium in the long nineteenth century
