= Hôtel Solvay =

Historic Art Nouveau house and UNESCO World Heritage Site in Brussels, Belgium

- Hôtel Solvay (French); Hotel Solvay (Dutch)
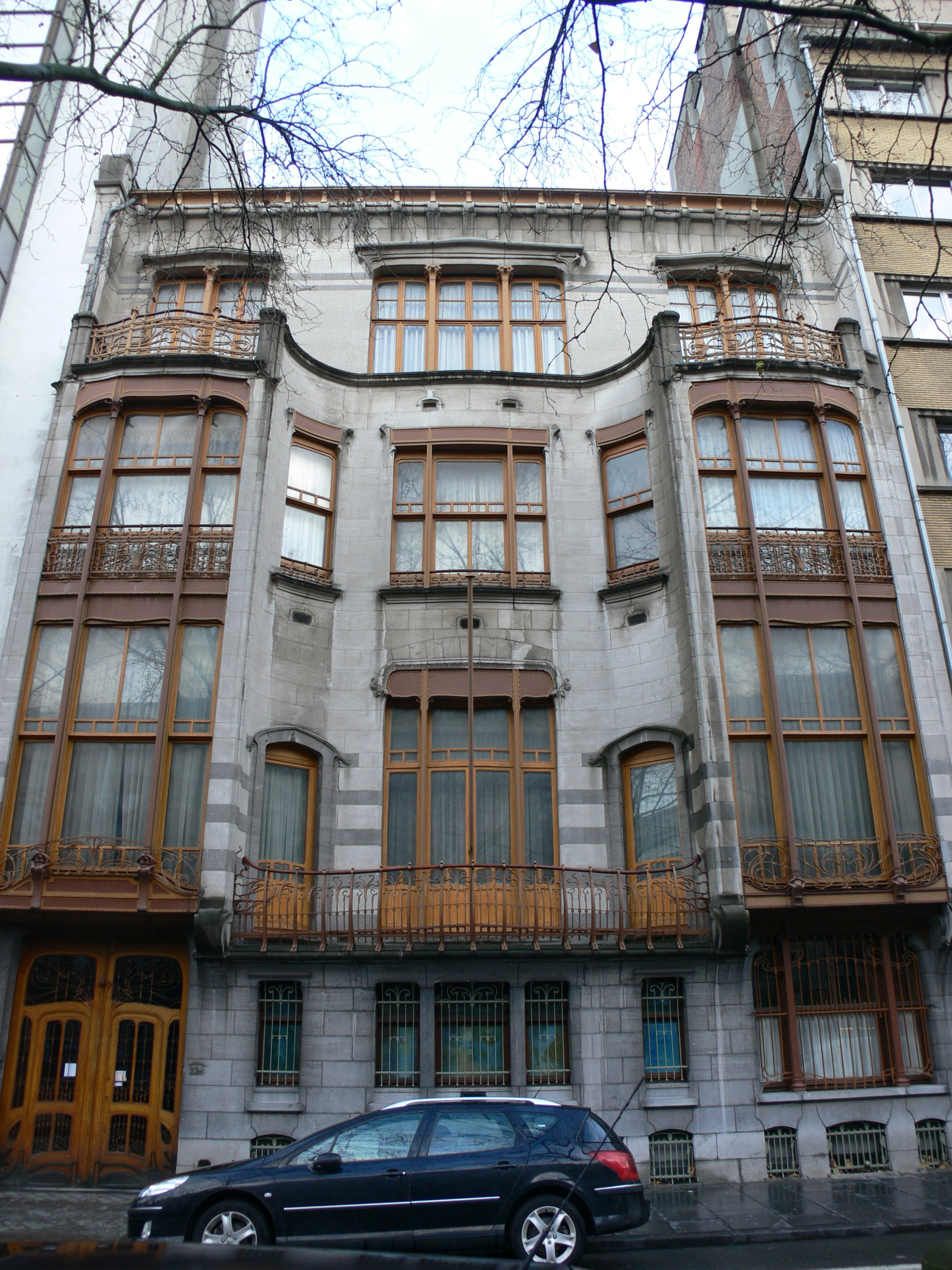
- Main façade of the Hôtel Solvay

General information
- Type: Town house
- Architectural style: Art Nouveau
- Location: Avenue Louise / Louizalaan 224, 1000 City of Brussels, Brussels-Capital Region, Belgium
- Coordinates: 50°49′34.75″N 4°21′55″E
- Current tenants: Louis Wittamer
- Construction started: 1895
- Completed: 1900
- Client: Armand Solvay

Design and construction
- Architect: Victor Horta

Website
- www.hotelsolvay.be/en

UNESCO World Heritage Site
- Official name: Major Town Houses of the Architect Victor Horta (Brussels)
- Type: Cultural
- Criteria: i, ii, iv
- Designated: 2000 (24th session)
- Reference no.: 1005
- Region: Europe and North America

The Hôtel Solvay (French: Hôtel Solvay; Dutch: Hotel Solvay), also known as the Solvay House, is a large historic town house in Brussels, Belgium. It was designed by Victor Horta for Armand Solvay, the son of the chemist and industrialist Ernest Solvay, and built between 1895 and 1900, in Art Nouveau style. It is located at 224, avenue Louise/Louizalaan, not far from the Hôtel Max Hallet, another Art Nouveau building by Horta.

Together with three other town houses of Victor Horta, including Horta's own house and workshop, it was added to the UNESCO World Heritage list in 2000 as the core of epoch-making urban residences that Horta designed before 1900.

== History ==
The Hôtel Solvay was designed and built by Victor Horta, between 1895 and 1900, to serve as a private residence for Armand Solvay, the son of the chemist, industrialist and philanthropist Ernest Solvay. For this wealthy patron, Horta could spend a fortune on precious materials and expensive details. He designed every single detail: furniture, carpets, light fittings, tableware and even the doorbell. He used expensive materials such as marble, onyx, bronze, tropical woods, etc. For the decoration of the staircase, he cooperated with the pointillist painter Théo van Rysselberghe.

The Hôtel Solvay and most of its content remained intact thanks to the Wittamer family. They acquired the house in the 1950s and did the utmost to preserve and restore it. The house was a private property until 2021, and could only be visited by appointment and under strict conditions. On 23 January 2021, the building began to operate as a museum, and currently accept visitors five days a month on selected timeslots.

== Restoration ==
In recent decades, the Hôtel Solvay has undergone significant restoration efforts aimed at preserving and enhancing the original Art Nouveau character designed by Victor Horta. These interventions focused on respecting the building's historical authenticity while ensuring its structural and functional longevity. Throughout the project, restoration decisions were guided by a critical assessment of Horta's original design intentions, the building's material history, and modern conservation ethics, allowing the Hôtel Solvay to maintain its historic character while subtly adapting to contemporary needs.

=== Façade restoration ===
Major renovation to the façade took place between March 2022 and October 2024 and was carried out under the direction of the architect Barbara Van der Wee and the supervision of Urban.brussels. The project consisted of restoring and consolidating the metalwork and wrought ironwork's structure. The exterior woodwork, stained glass windows, and natural stone were restored, the lead cladding on the balconies was renovated, and the rainwater drains were modified. The metalwork and joinery were also repainted in their original colours.

=== Interior restoration ===
The interior restoration strategy prioritised minimal intervention and reversibility. Original materials and techniques were retained wherever possible. Conservation work included the careful cleaning and stabilisation of decorative surfaces such as marble, wood, and metalwork. Wall finishes, including rare wallpapers and silks, were preserved with minimal retouching. In areas where deterioration was advanced, materials were replaced with historically accurate reproductions. This approach ensured that the patina of age remained visible, preserving the integrity of Horta's design vision.

=== Roof restoration ===
The roof posed particular challenges due to its structural complexity and the presence of original materials, such as zinc panels and wooden framing. Restoration teams undertook a detailed survey to document the roof's condition. Damaged sections were repaired or replaced using materials identical to the originals. Improved insulation and drainage systems were discreetly integrated to enhance performance without altering the building's external appearance. These measures not only addressed water infiltration issues but also improved the structure's overall energy efficiency.

== Awards ==
The UNESCO commission recognised the Hôtel Solvay as UNESCO World Heritage in 2000, as part of the listing 'Major Town Houses of the Architect Victor Horta':

The four major town houses—Hôtel Tassel, Hôtel Solvay, Hôtel van Eetvelde, and Maison & Atelier Horta—located in Brussels and designed by the architect Victor Horta, one of the earliest initiators of Art Nouveau, are some of the most remarkable pioneering works of architecture of the end of the 19th century. The stylistic revolution represented by these works is characterised by their open plan, the diffusion of light, and the brilliant joining of the curved lines of decoration with the structure of the building.

== Gallery ==
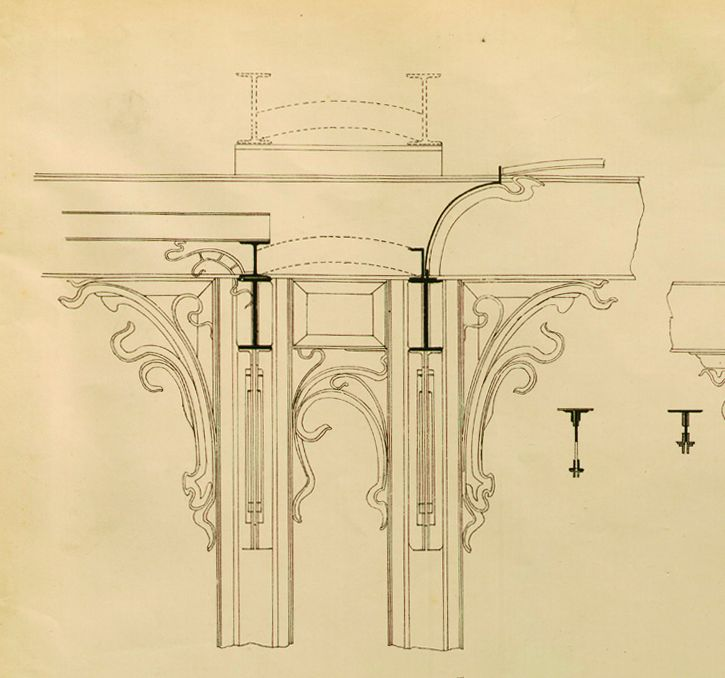
Design of interior decoration by Horta

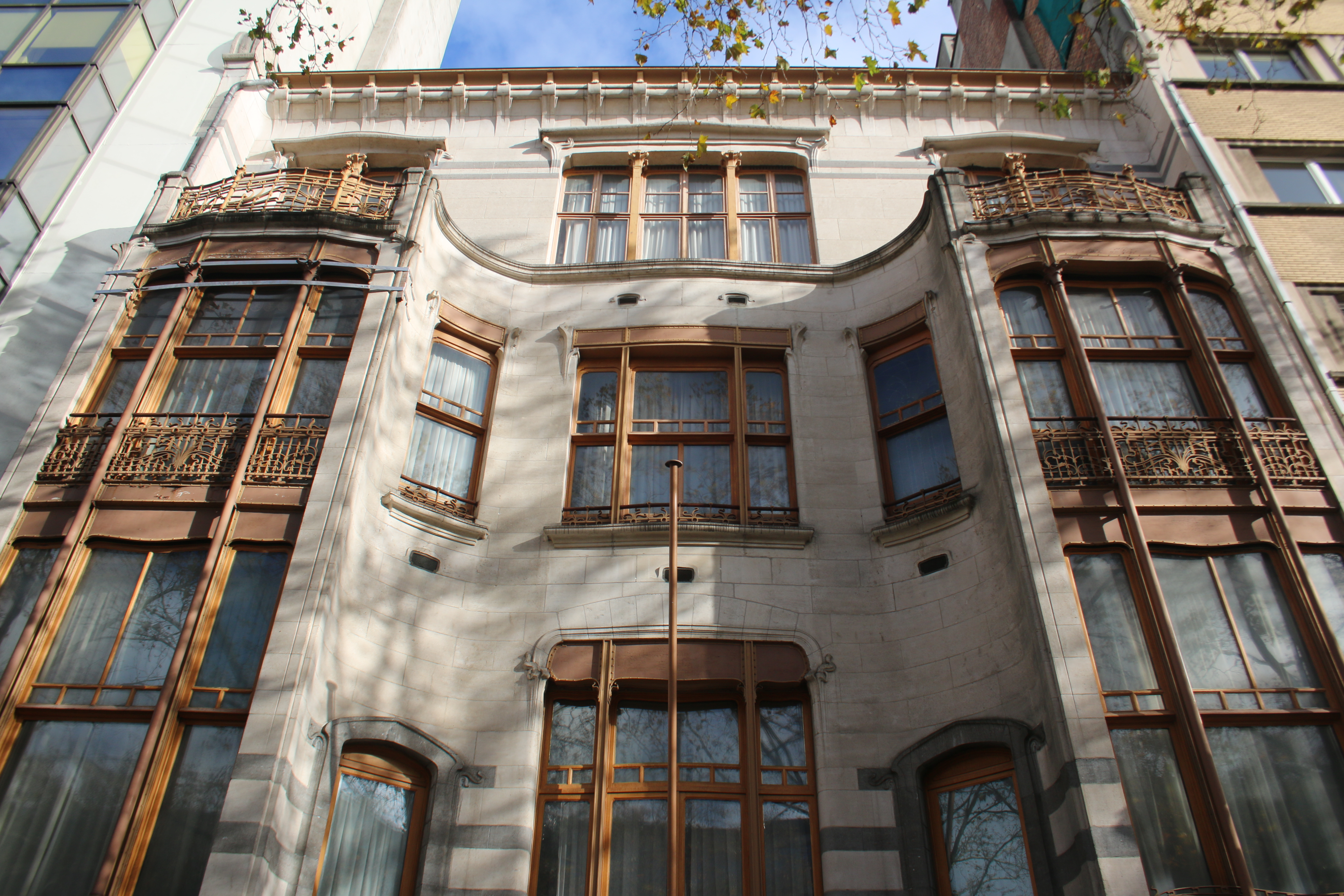
Façade

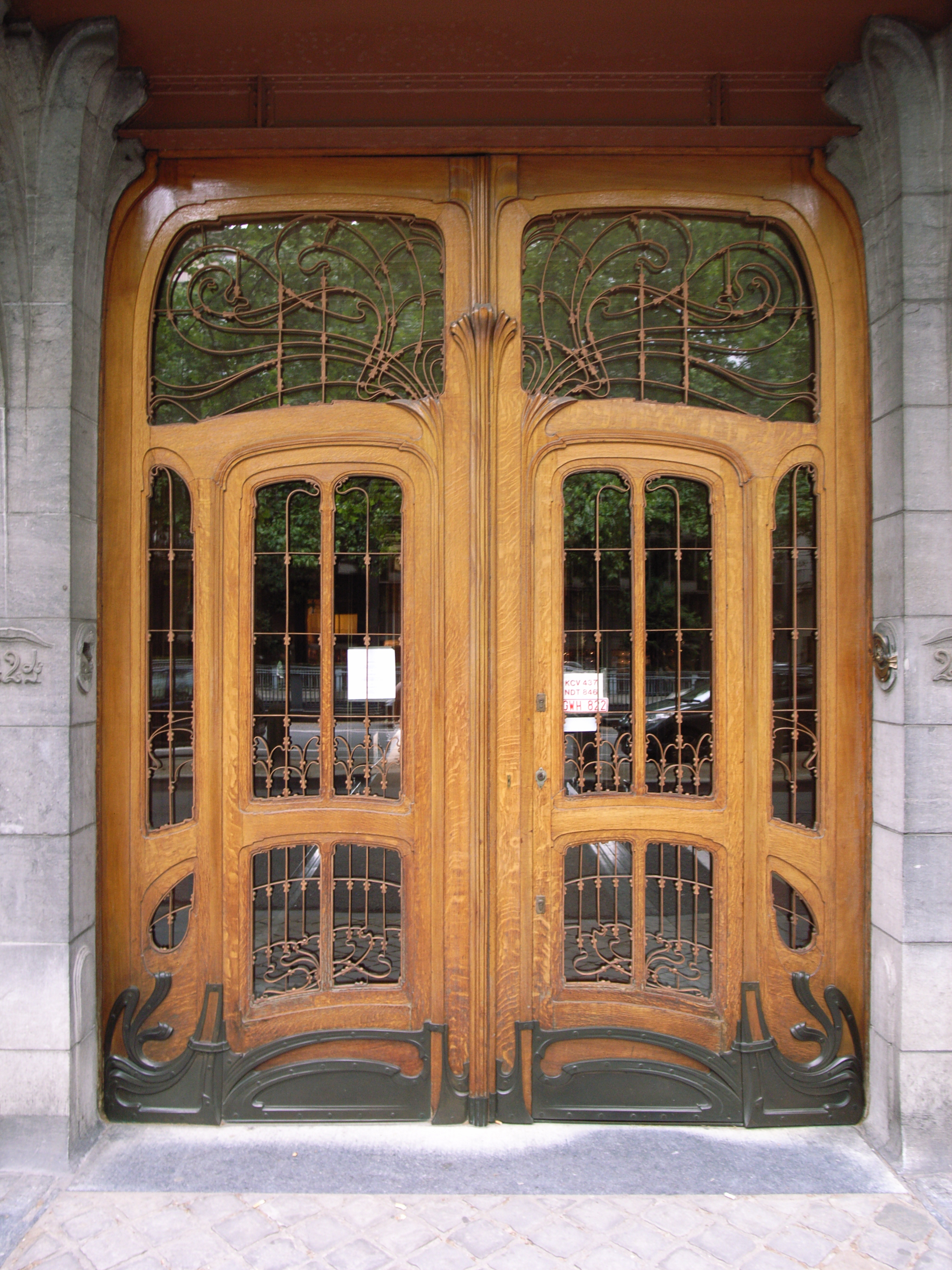
Entrance

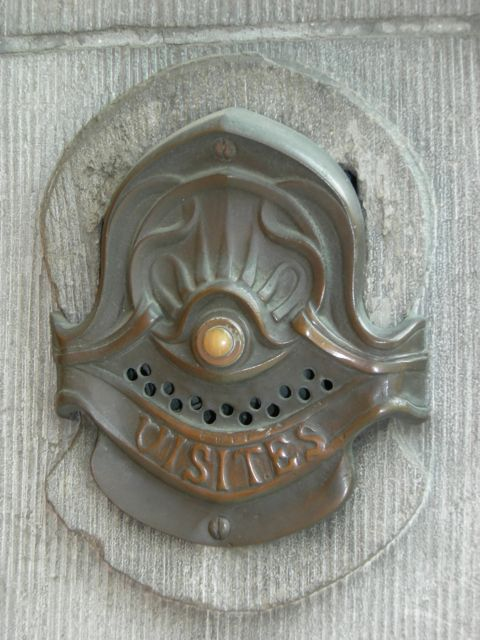
Doorbell

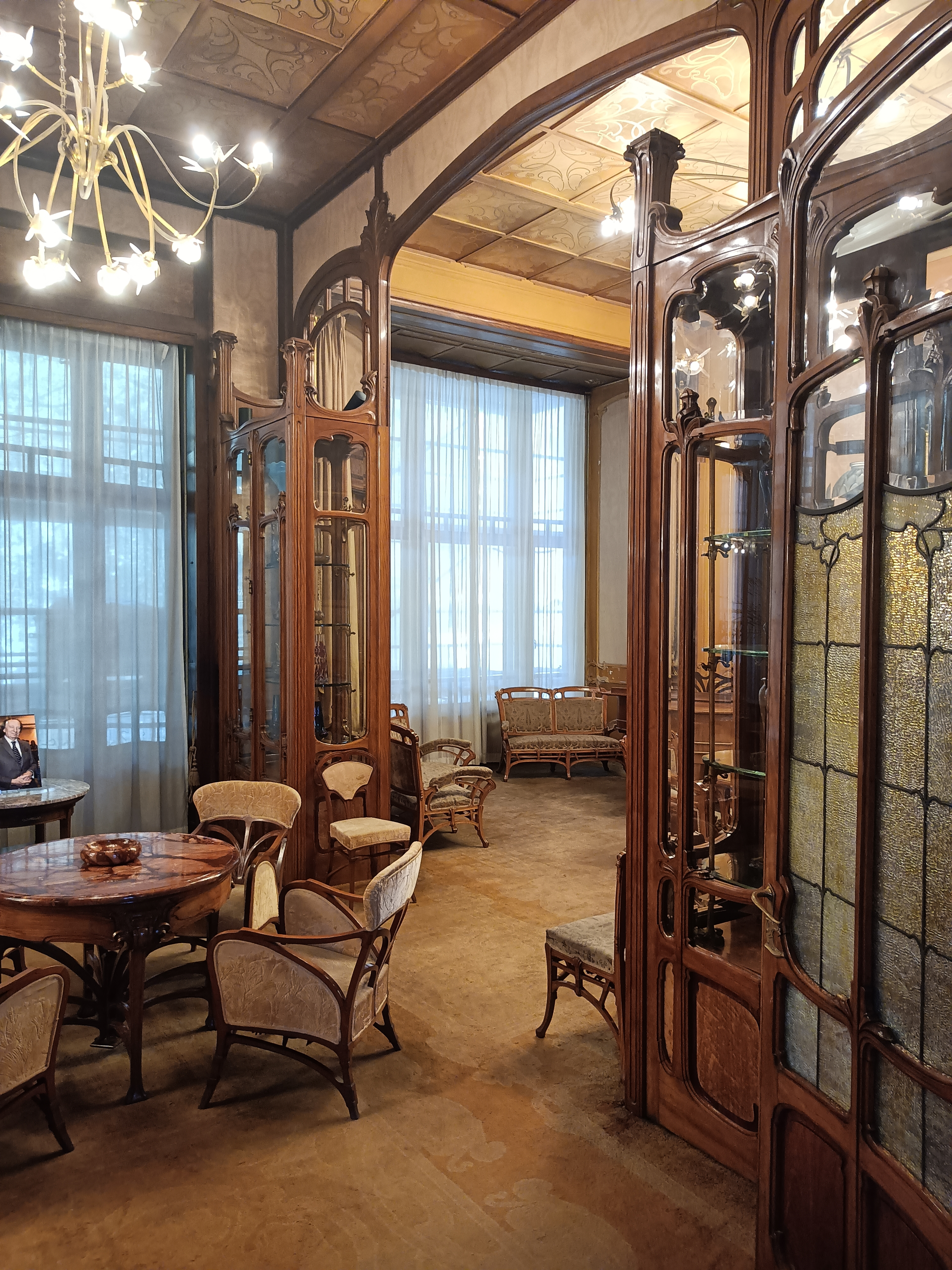
Central salon

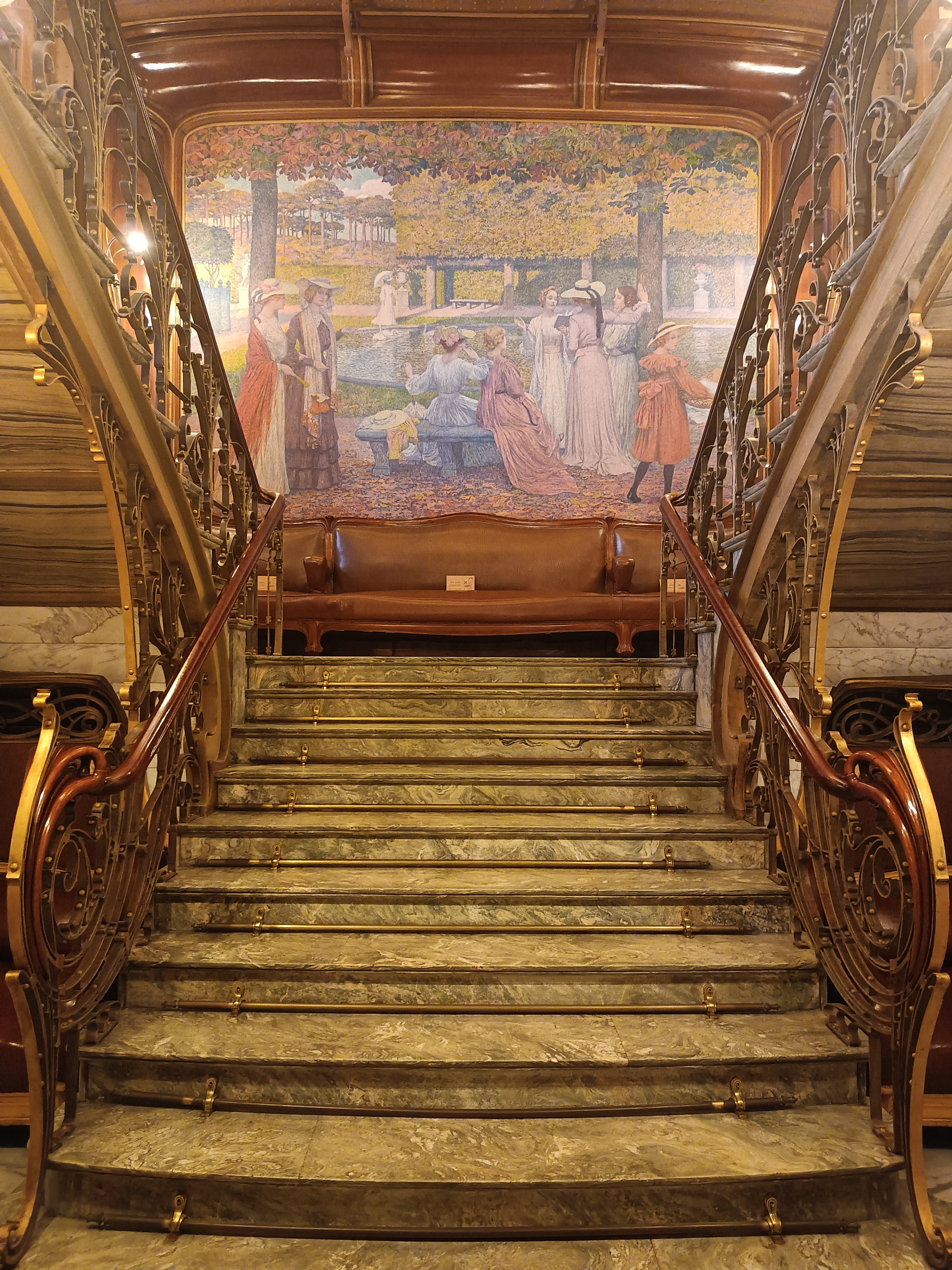
Main stairs to first floor

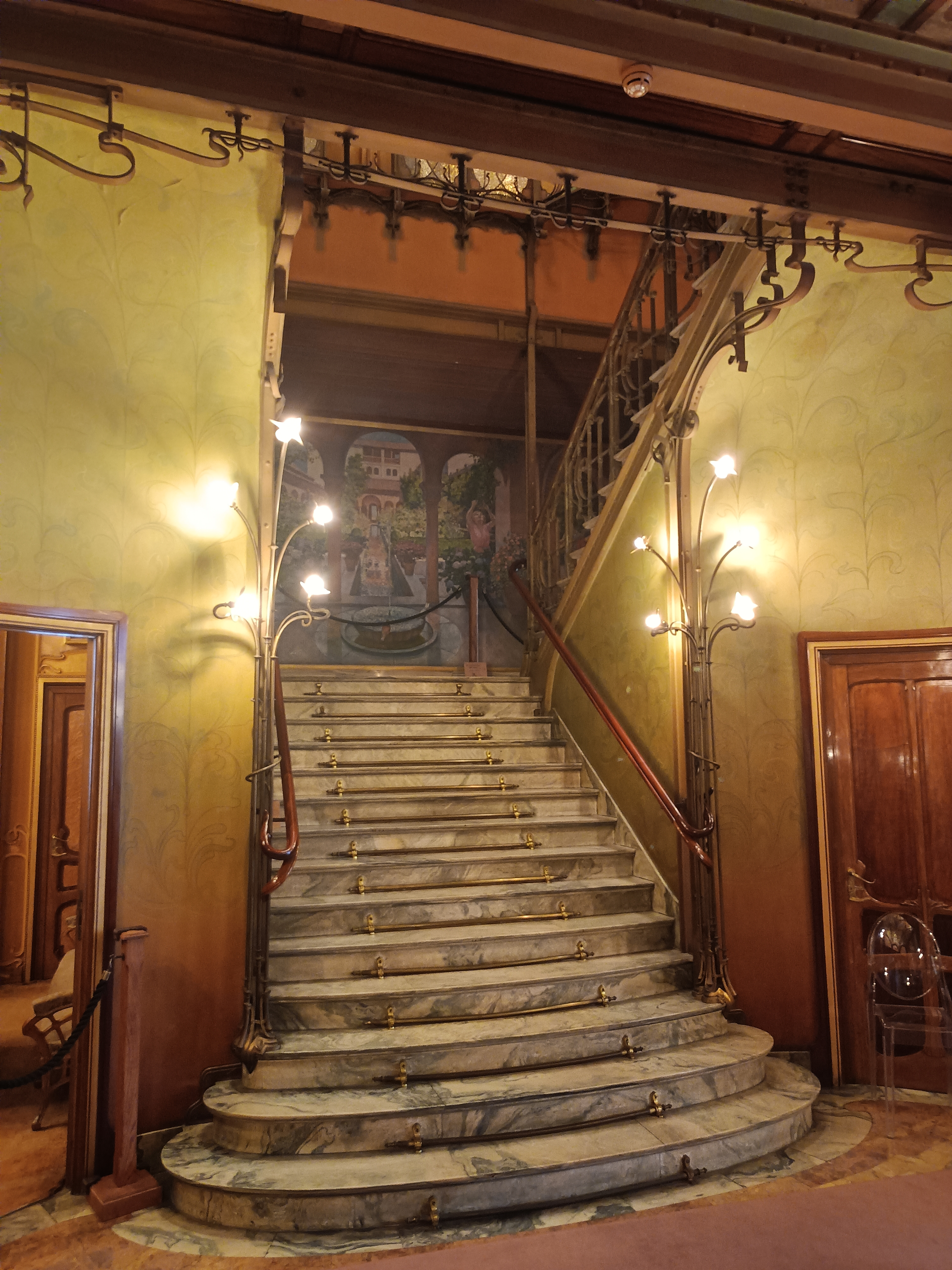
Stairs between first and second floors

== See also ==
- Art Nouveau in Brussels
- History of Brussels
- Culture of Belgium
- Belgium in the long nineteenth century
