= Hôtel Max Hallet =

Historic Art Nouveau house in Brussels, Belgium

- Hôtel Max Hallet (French); Hotel Max Hallet (Dutch)
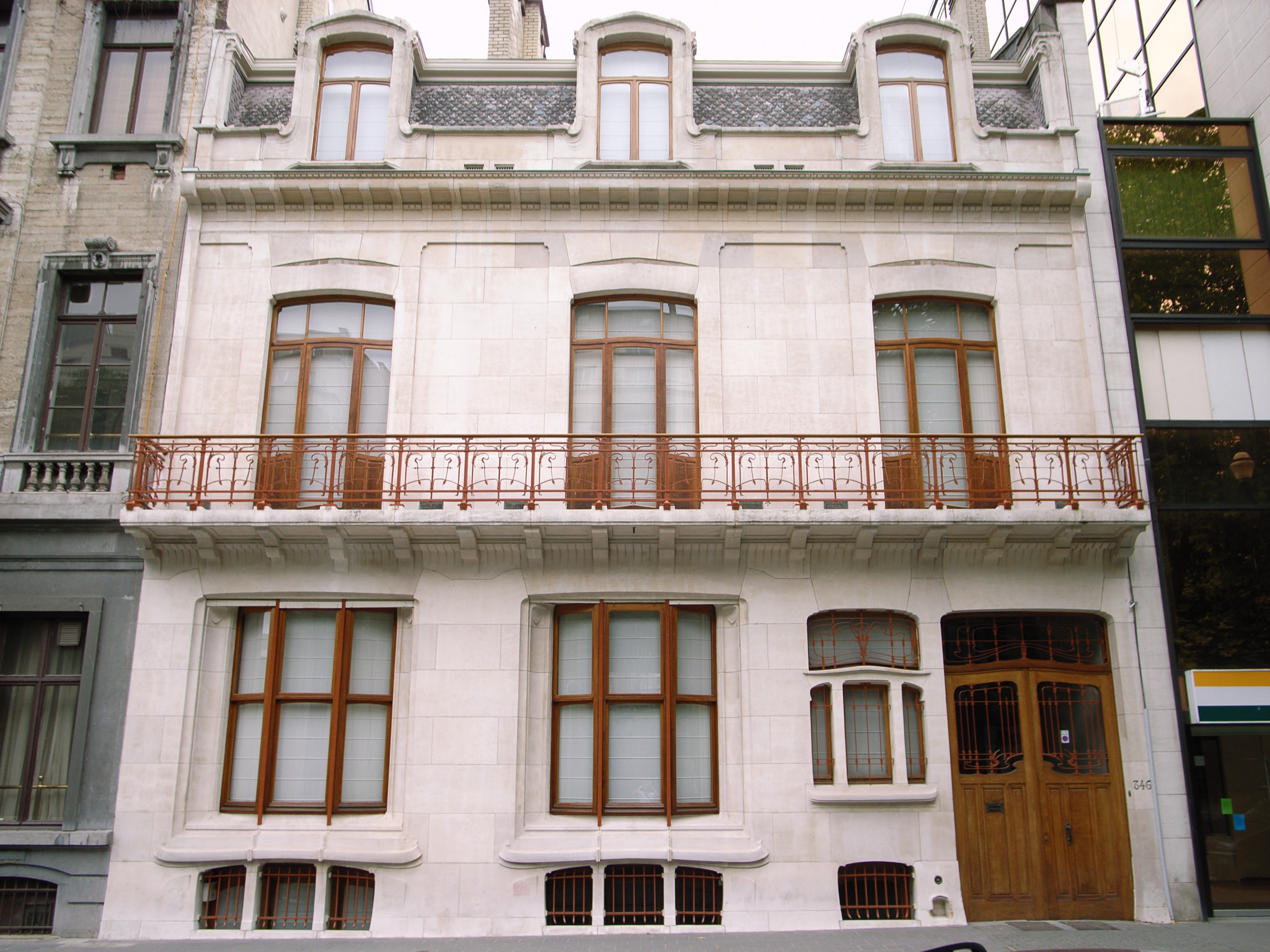
- Main façade of the Hôtel Max Hallet
- Interactive map of the Hôtel Max Hallet area

General information
- Type: Town house
- Architectural style: Art Nouveau
- Location: Avenue Louise / Louizalaan 346, 1000 City of Brussels, Brussels-Capital Region, Belgium
- Coordinates: 50°49′20.6″N 4°22′10.6″E
- Construction started: 1903
- Completed: 1906

The Hôtel Max Hallet (French: Hôtel Max Hallet; Dutch: Hotel Max Hallet), also known as the Max Hallet House, is a historic town house in Brussels, Belgium. It was designed by Victor Horta, and built between 1903 and 1906, in Art Nouveau style. It is located at 346, avenue Louise/Louizalaan, not far from the Hôtel Solvay, another Art Nouveau building by Horta.

== See also ==
- Art Nouveau in Brussels
- History of Brussels
- Culture of Belgium
- Belgium in the long nineteenth century
