= Brussels =

Federal region of Belgium including the capital

Brussels: Bruxelles (French); Brussel (Dutch)
- Region
- Brussels-Capital Region; Région de Bruxelles-Capitale (French); Brussels Hoofdstedelijk Gewest (Dutch)
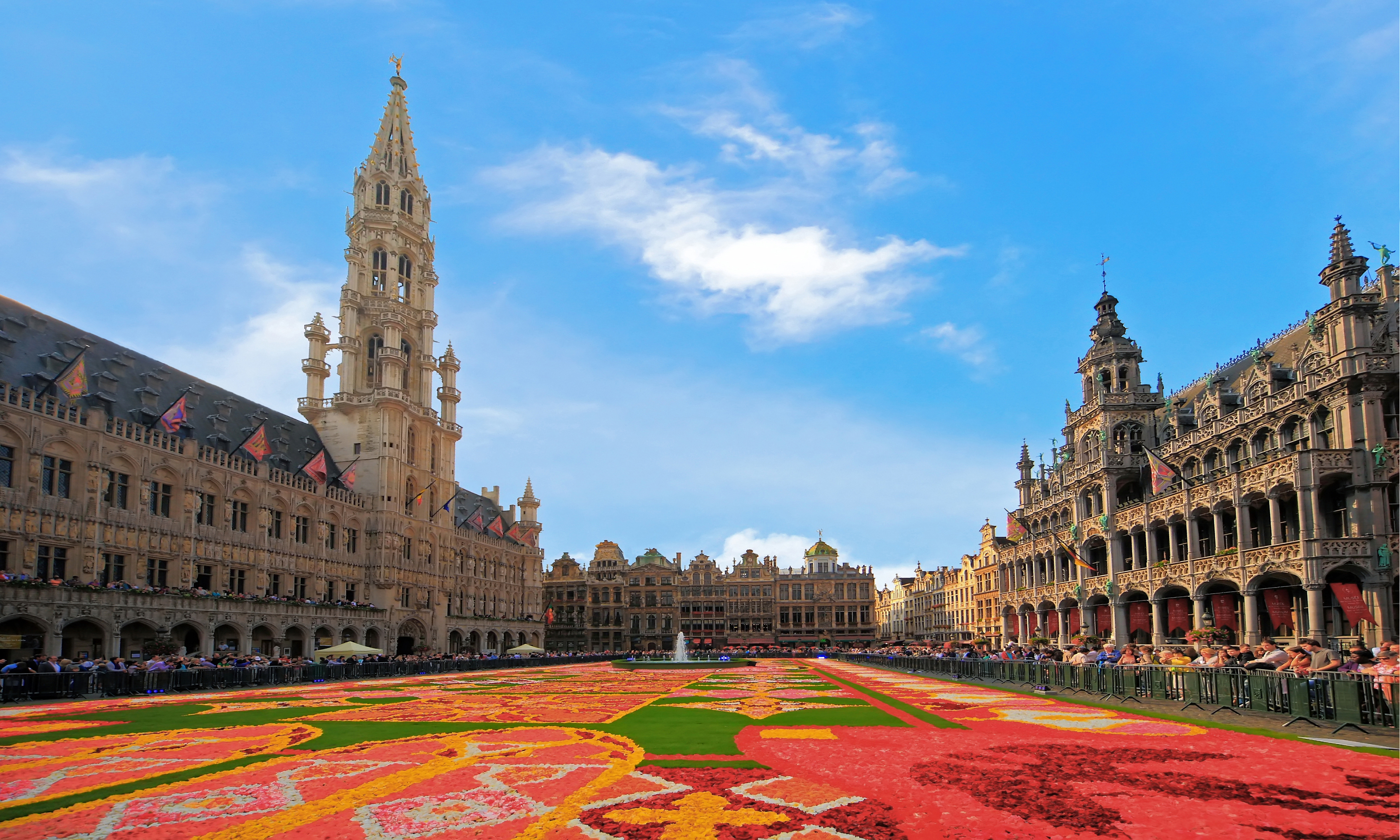
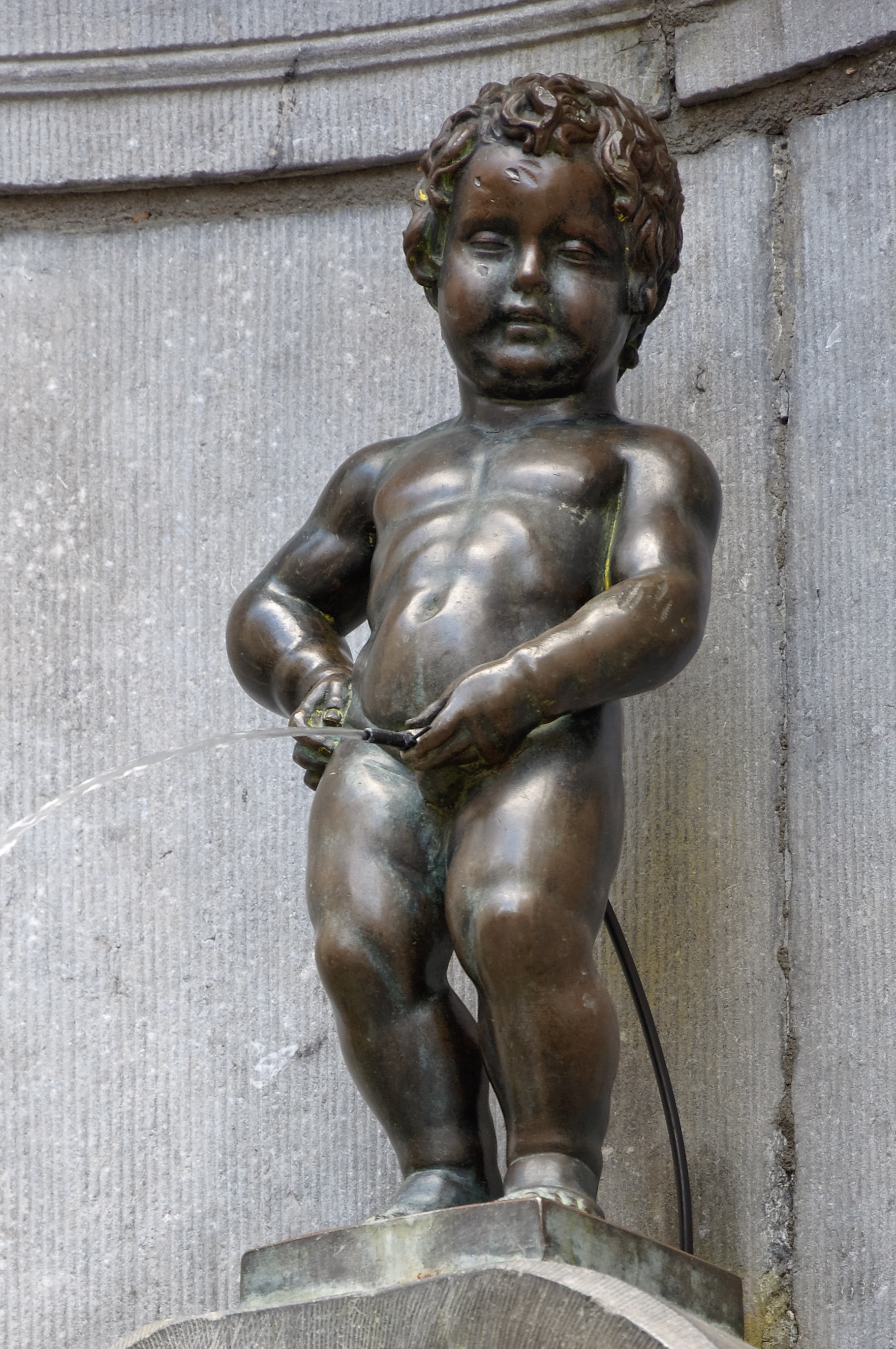
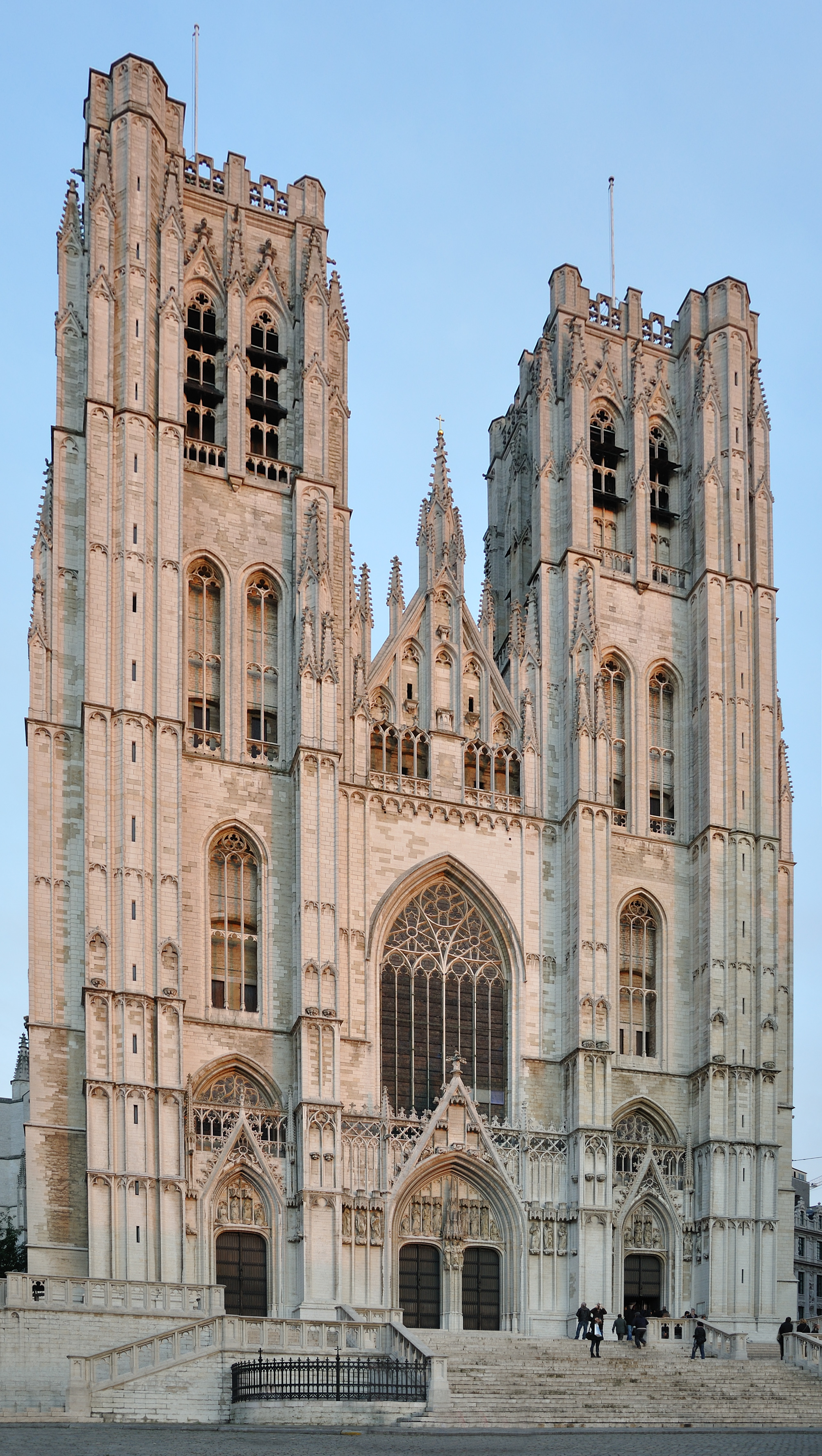
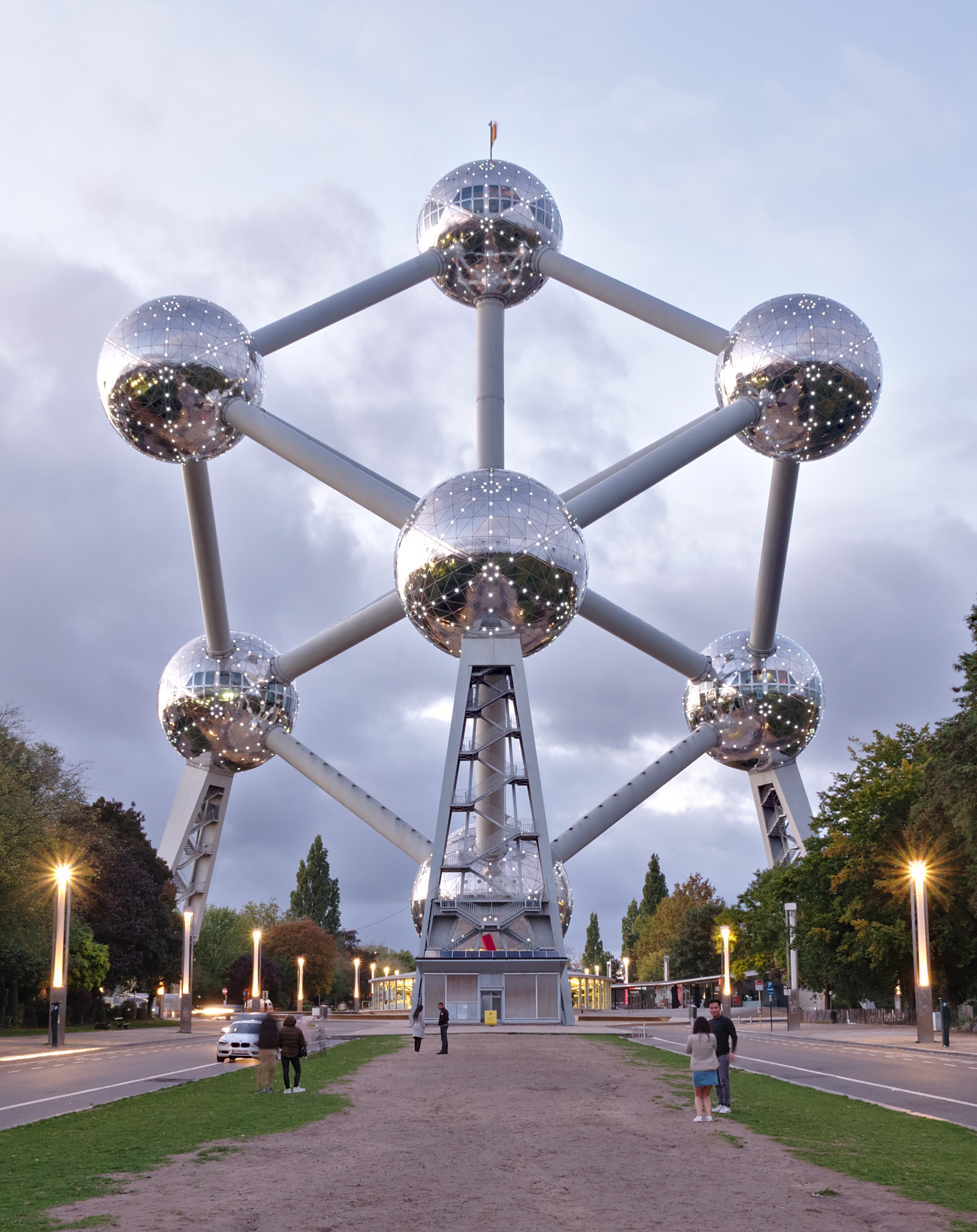
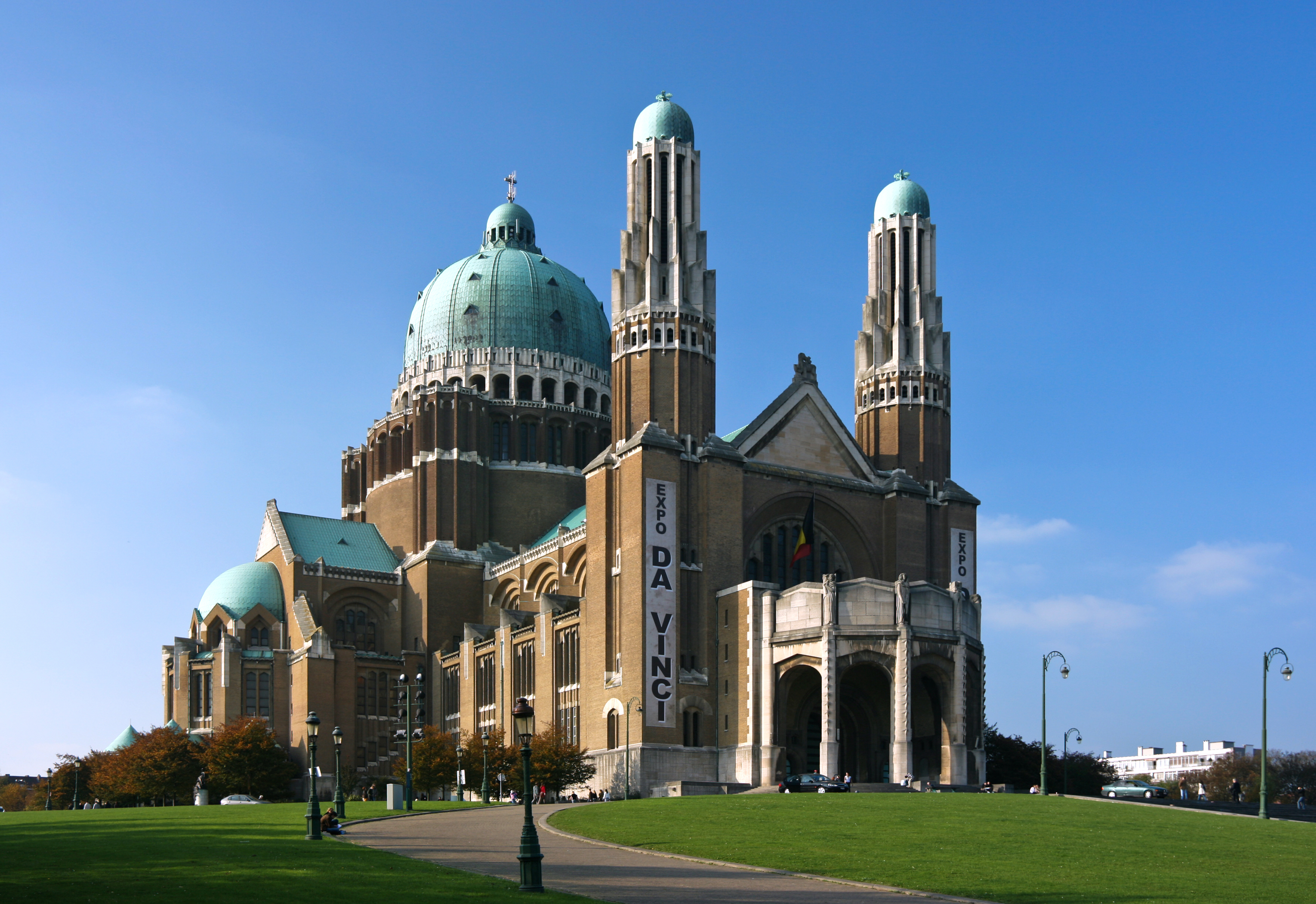
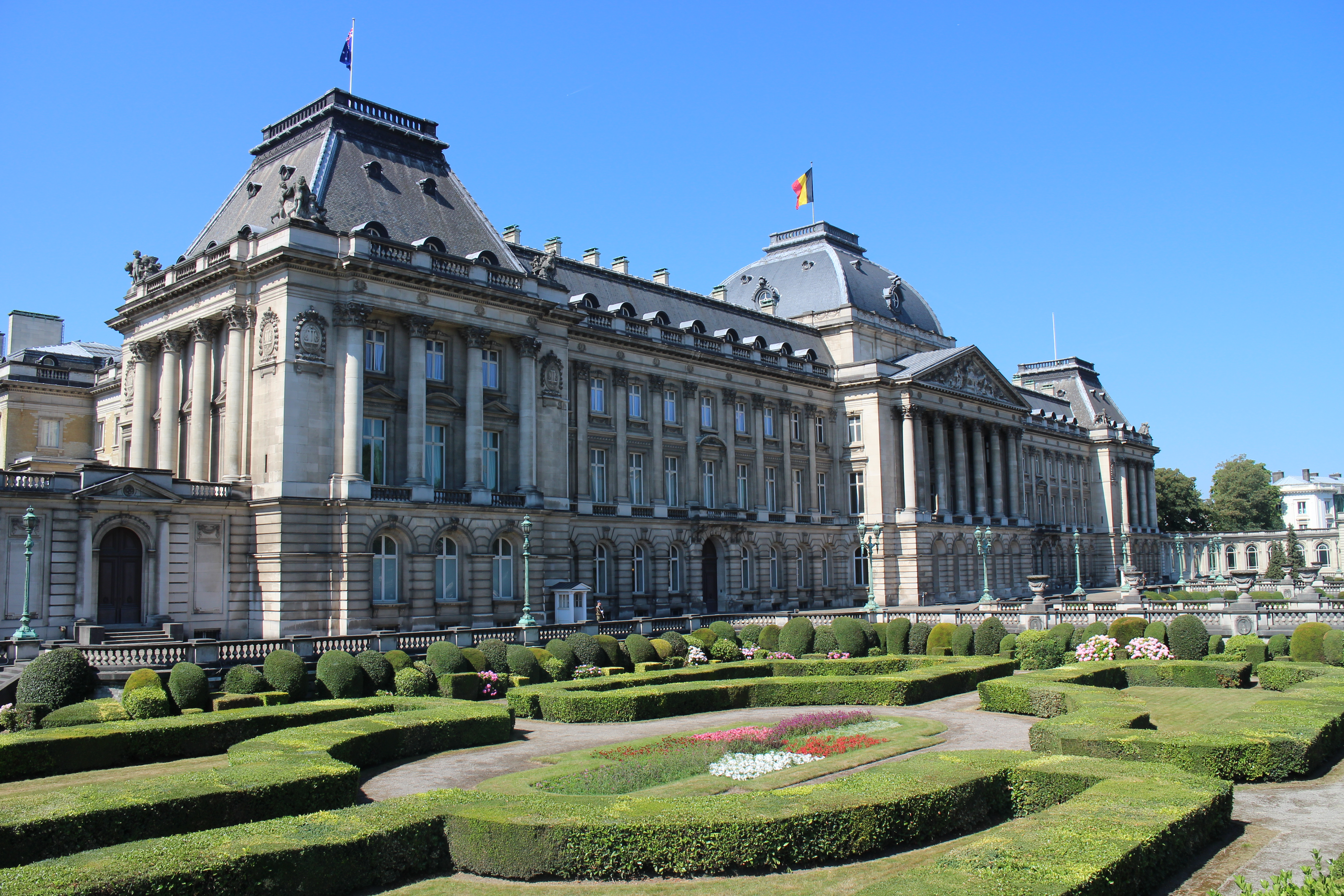
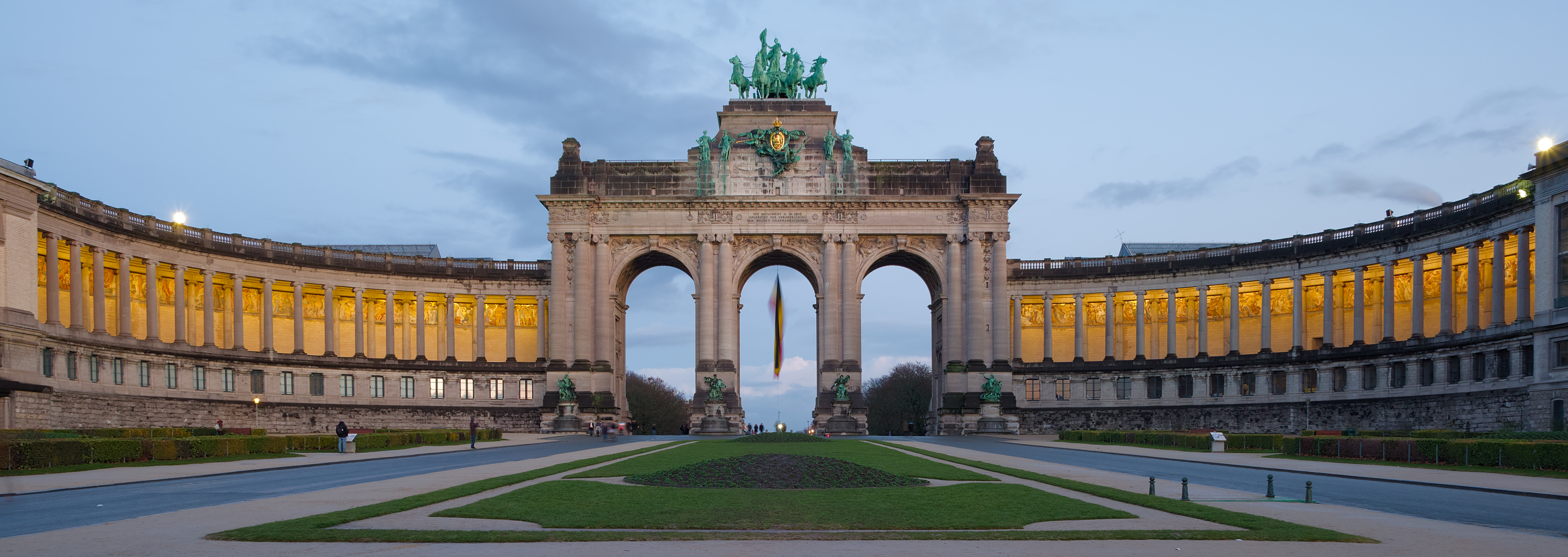
- Flower Carpet event at the Grand-Place/Grote Markt Manneken Pis St. Michael and St. Gudula Atomium Basilica of Koekelberg Royal Palace Parc du Cinquantenaire/Jubelpark

- Flag Brandmark
- Nicknames: Capital of Europe, Comic City, BX(L)
- Interactive map of Brussels
- Location within Belgium Location within Europe
- Coordinates: 50°50′48″N 04°21′09″E
- Country: Belgium
- Community: French Community; Flemish Community
- Settled: c. 580
- County established: c. 870
- Founded: 979
- City charter granted: 10 June 1229
- Region established: 18 June 1989
- Founder: Charles, Duke of Lower Lorraine
- Capital: City of Brussels
- Municipalities: List: Anderlecht; Auderghem / Oudergem; Berchem-Sainte-Agathe / Sint-Agatha-Berchem; Bruxelles-Ville / Brussel-Stad; Etterbeek; Evere; Forest / Vorst; Ganshoren; Ixelles / Elsene; Jette; Koekelberg; Molenbeek-Saint-Jean / Sint-Jans-Molenbeek; Saint-Gilles / Sint-Gillis; Saint-Josse-ten-Noode / Sint-Joost-ten-Node; Schaerbeek / Schaarbeek; Uccle / Ukkel; Watermael-Boitsfort / Watermaal-Bosvoorde; Woluwe-Saint-Lambert / Sint-Lambrechts-Woluwe; Woluwe-Saint-Pierre / Sint-Pieters-Woluwe

Government
  - Executive: Government of the Brussels-Capital Region, since 2026 the Dilliès government
  - Governing parties (2026–present): MR, PS, Les Engagés, Groen, Vooruit, Anders, CD&V
  - Minister-President: Boris Dilliès (MR)
  - Legislature: Parliament of the Brussels-Capital Region
  - Speaker: Bertin Mampaka Mankamba (MR)

Area
  - Region/City: 162.42 km^{2} (62.71 sq mi)
- Elevation: 13 m (43 ft)

Population (1 January 2024)
  - Region/City: 1,249,597
  - Rank: 1st
  - Density: 7,693.6/km^{2} (19,926/sq mi)
  - Metro: 2,500,000
- Demonyms: Brusselian, Brusseler; fr Bruxellois(e); nl Brusselaar/Brusselse

Demographics
  - Official languages: French; Dutch
  - Ethnic groups: 22% Belgians; 78% others 41.8% non-European

GDP
  - Region/City: €108.153 billion (2024)
  - Metro: €200.457 billion (2022)
- Time zone: UTC+1 (CET)
  - Summer (DST): UTC+2 (CEST)
- Postal code(s): 42 postal codes
- Area code: 02
- ISO 3166 code: BE-BRU
- GeoTLD: .brussels
- HDI (2021): 0.953 very high · 1st of 11
- Website: be.brussels

Brussels, (Note: /ˈbrʌsəlz/; French: Bruxelles [bʁysɛl] or [bʁyksɛl]; Dutch: Brussel [ˈbrʏsəl]) officially the Brussels-Capital Region, (Note: French: Région de Bruxelles-Capitale [ʁeʒjɔ̃ də bʁy(k)sɛl kapital]; Dutch: Brussels Hoofdstedelijk Gewest [ˈbrʏsəls ˌɦoːftˈsteːdələk xəˈʋɛst]) is a region of Belgium comprising 19 municipalities, including the City of Brussels, which is the capital of Belgium. The Brussels-Capital Region is located in the central portion of the country. It is a part of both the French Community of Belgium and the Flemish Community, and is separate from the Flemish Region (Flanders), within which it forms an enclave, and the Walloon Region (Wallonia), located less than 4 km (2.5 mi) south.

Brussels grew from a small rural settlement on the river Senne to become an important city-region in Europe. Since the end of the Second World War, it has been a major centre for international politics and home to numerous international organisations, politicians, diplomats and civil servants. Brussels is the de facto capital of the European Union, as it hosts a number of principal EU institutions, including its administrative-legislative, executive-political, and legislative branches. (Note: Brussels is not formally declared capital of the EU, though its position is spelled out in the Treaty of Amsterdam. The judicial branch of the EU is located in Luxembourg, and the European Parliament meets for a minority of the year in Strasbourg. See the section dedicated to this issue.) Because of this, its name is sometimes used metonymically to describe the EU and its institutions. The secretariat of the Benelux and the headquarters of NATO are also located in Brussels.

Brussels is the most densely populated region in Belgium, and although it has the highest GDP per capita, it has the lowest disposable household income. The Brussels Region covers 162 km^{2} (63 sq mi) and has a population of over 1.2 million. Its five times larger metropolitan area comprises over 2.5 million people, which makes it the largest in Belgium. It is also part of a large diamond-shaped conurbation, extending towards the cities of Ghent, Antwerp and Leuven, as well as the province of Walloon Brabant, in total home to over 5 million people. As Belgium's economic capital and a top financial centre in Western Europe with Euronext Brussels, Brussels is classified as an Alpha- global city. It is also a national and international hub for rail, road and air traffic, and is sometimes considered, together with Belgium, as Europe's geographic, economic and cultural crossroads. The Brussels Metro is the only rapid transit system in Belgium. (Note: Antwerp and Charleroi both have light rail systems.) In addition, both its airport and railway stations are the busiest in the country.

Historically Dutch-speaking, Brussels saw a language shift to French from the late 19th century. Since its creation in 1989, the Brussels-Capital Region has been officially bilingual in French and Dutch, although French is the majority language and lingua franca. Brussels is also increasingly becoming multilingual. English is spoken widely and many migrants and expatriates speak other languages as well. The Region is governed by the Dilliès government, a broad bilingual coalition of seven parties.

Brussels is known for its cuisine and gastronomic offer (including its local waffle, its chocolate, French fries and numerous types of beers), as well as its historical and architectural landmarks; some of them are registered as UNESCO World Heritage Sites. Principal attractions include its historic Grand-Place/Grote Markt (main square), Manneken Pis, the Atomium, and cultural institutions such as La Monnaie/De Munt and the Museums of Art and History. Due to its long tradition of Belgian comics, Brussels is also hailed as a capital of the comic strip.

== Toponymy ==
=== Etymology ===
The most common theory of the origin of the name Brussels is that it derives from the Old Dutch Bruocsella, Broekzele or Broeksel, meaning 'marsh' (bruoc / broek) and 'home, settlement' (sella / zele / sel) or 'settlement in the marsh'. Saint Vindicianus, the Bishop of Cambrai, made the first recorded reference to the place Brosella in 695, when it was still a hamlet. The names of all the municipalities in the Brussels-Capital Region are also of Dutch origin, except for Evere, which is possibly Celtic or Old Frankish.

=== Pronunciation ===
In French, Bruxelles is pronounced [bʁysɛl] (Note: The x is pronounced /s/ and the final s is silent.) and in Dutch, Brussel is pronounced [ˈbrʏsəl]. Inhabitants of Brussels are known in French as Bruxellois (pronounced [bʁysɛlwa]) and in Dutch as Brusselaars (pronounced [ˈbrʏsəlaːrs]). In the Brabantian dialect of Brussels (known as Brusselian, and also sometimes referred to as Marollian), they are called Brusseleers or Brusseleirs.

Originally, the written x was pronounced /ks/. In the Belgian French pronunciation as well as in Dutch, the k eventually disappeared, as reflected in the current Dutch spelling, whereas in the more conservative French form, the spelling remained. In France, the pronunciations [bʁyksɛl] and [bʁyksɛlwa] (for bruxellois) are often heard, but are rather rare in Belgium.

== History ==
=== Early history ===
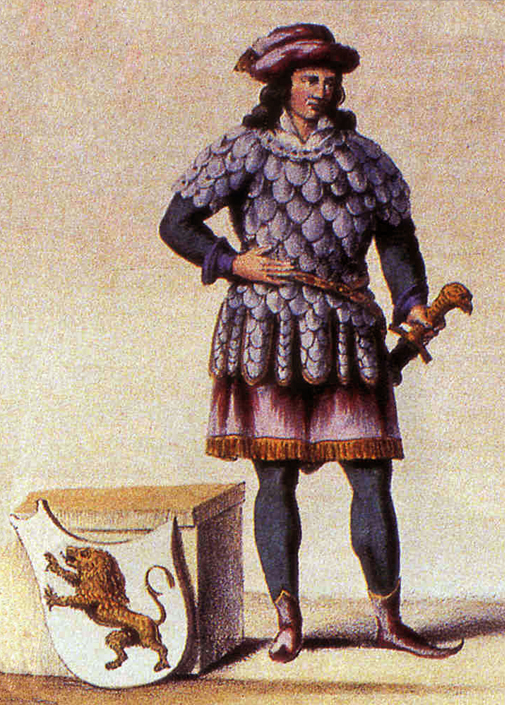
Charles of Lorraine, traditionally considered the founder of what would become Brussels, c. 979

The history of Brussels is closely linked to that of Western Europe. Traces of human settlement go back to the Stone Age, with vestiges and place-names related to the civilisation of megaliths, dolmens and standing stones (Plattesteen near the Grand-Place/Grote Markt and Tomberg in Woluwe-Saint-Lambert, for example). During late antiquity, the region was home to Roman occupation, as attested by archaeological evidence discovered on the current site of Tour & Taxis, north-west of the Pentagon (Brussels' city centre). Following the decline of the Western Roman Empire, it was incorporated into the Frankish Empire.

According to local legend, the origin of the settlement that was to become Brussels lies in Saint Gaugericus' construction of a chapel on an island in the river Senne around 580. The official founding of Brussels is usually said to be around 979, when Charles, Duke of Lower Lorraine, transferred the relics of the martyr Saint Gudula from Moorsel (located in today's province of East Flanders) to Saint Gaugericus' chapel. When Otto II, Holy Roman Emperor, appointed the same Charles to become Duke of Lower Lotharingia in 977, Charles ordered the construction of the city's first permanent fortification, doing so on that same island.

=== Middle Ages ===
Lambert I, Count of Louvain, gained the County of Brussels around 1000 by marrying Charles' daughter. Because of its location on the banks of the Senne, on an important trade route between the Flemish cities of Bruges and Ghent, and Cologne in the Kingdom of Germany, Brussels became a commercial centre specialised in the textile trade. The town grew quite rapidly and extended towards the upper town (Treurenberg, Coudenberg/Koudenberg, and Sablon/Zavel areas), where there was a reduced risk of floods. As the town grew to a population of around 30,000, the surrounding marshes were drained to allow for further expansion. In 1183, the Counts of Leuven became Dukes of Brabant. Brabant, unlike the county of Flanders, was not fief of the king of France but was incorporated into the Holy Roman Empire.

In the early 13th century, the first walls of Brussels were built and after this, the city grew significantly. Around this time, work began on what is now the Cathedral of St. Michael and St. Gudula (1225), replacing an older Romanesque church. To let the city expand, a second set of walls was erected between 1356 and 1383. Traces of these walls can still be seen; the Small Ring, a series of boulevards bounding the historical city centre, follows their former course.

=== Early modern ===
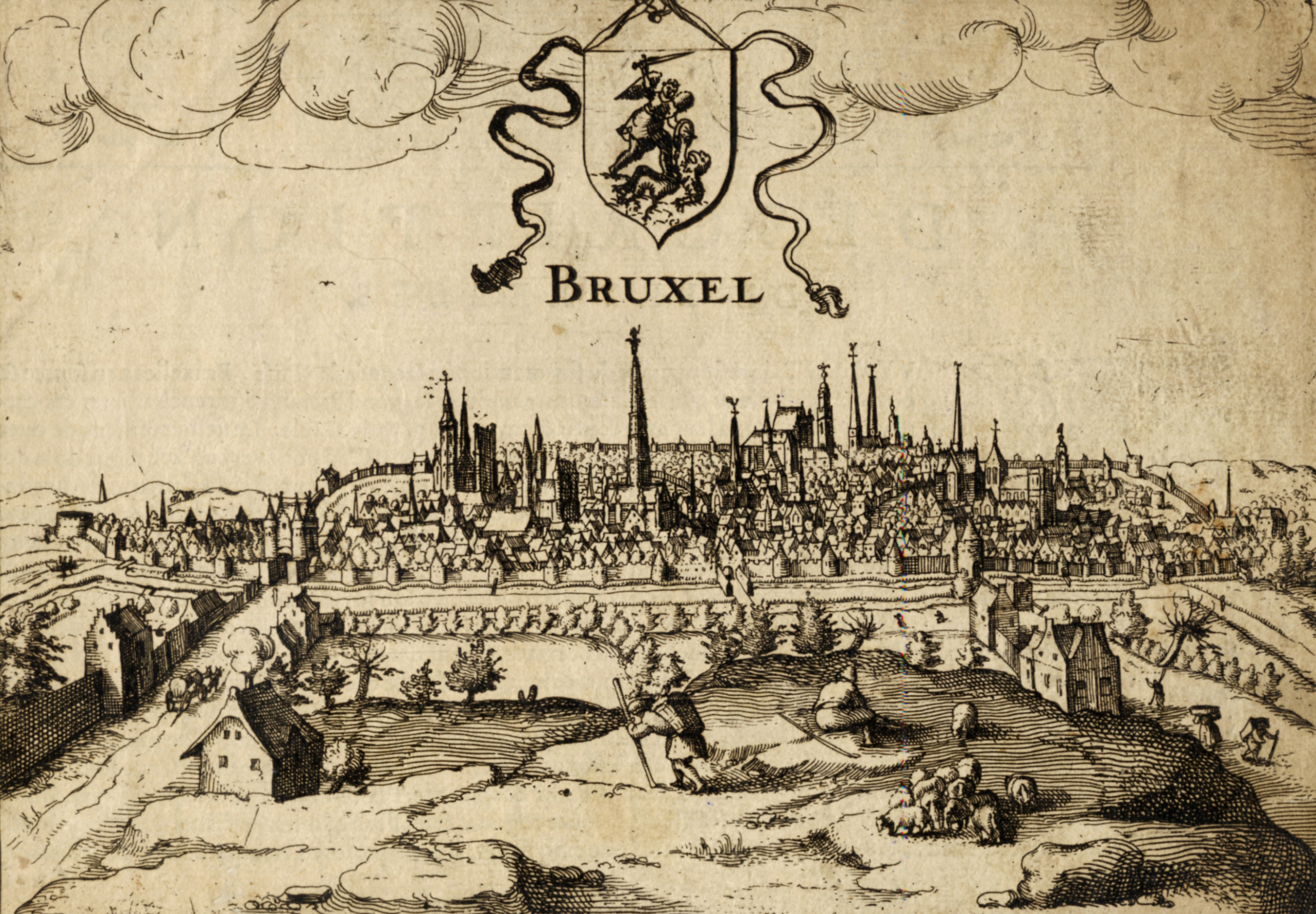
View of Brussels, c. 1610

In the 14th century, the marriage between heiress Margaret III, Countess of Flanders, and Philip the Bold, Duke of Burgundy, produced a new Duke of Brabant of the House of Valois, namely Anthony, their son. In 1477, the Burgundian duke Charles the Bold perished in the Battle of Nancy. Through the marriage of his daughter Mary of Burgundy (who was born in Brussels) to Holy Roman Emperor Maximilian I, the Low Countries fell under Habsburg sovereignty. Brabant was integrated into this composite state, and Brussels flourished as the Princely Capital of the prosperous Burgundian Netherlands, also known as the Seventeen Provinces. After the death of Mary in 1482, her son Philip the Handsome succeeded as Duke of Burgundy and Brabant.

Philip died in 1506, and he was succeeded by his son Charles V who then also became King of Spain (crowned in the Cathedral of St. Michael and St. Gudula) and even Holy Roman Emperor at the death of his grandfather Maximilian I in 1519. Charles was now the ruler of a Habsburg Empire "on which the sun never sets" with Brussels serving as one of his main capitals. It was in the Coudenberg Palace that Charles V was declared of age in 1515, and it was there in 1555 that he abdicated all of his possessions and passed the Habsburg Netherlands to King Philip II of Spain. This palace, famous all over Europe, had greatly expanded since it had first become the seat of the Dukes of Brabant, but it was destroyed by fire in 1731.

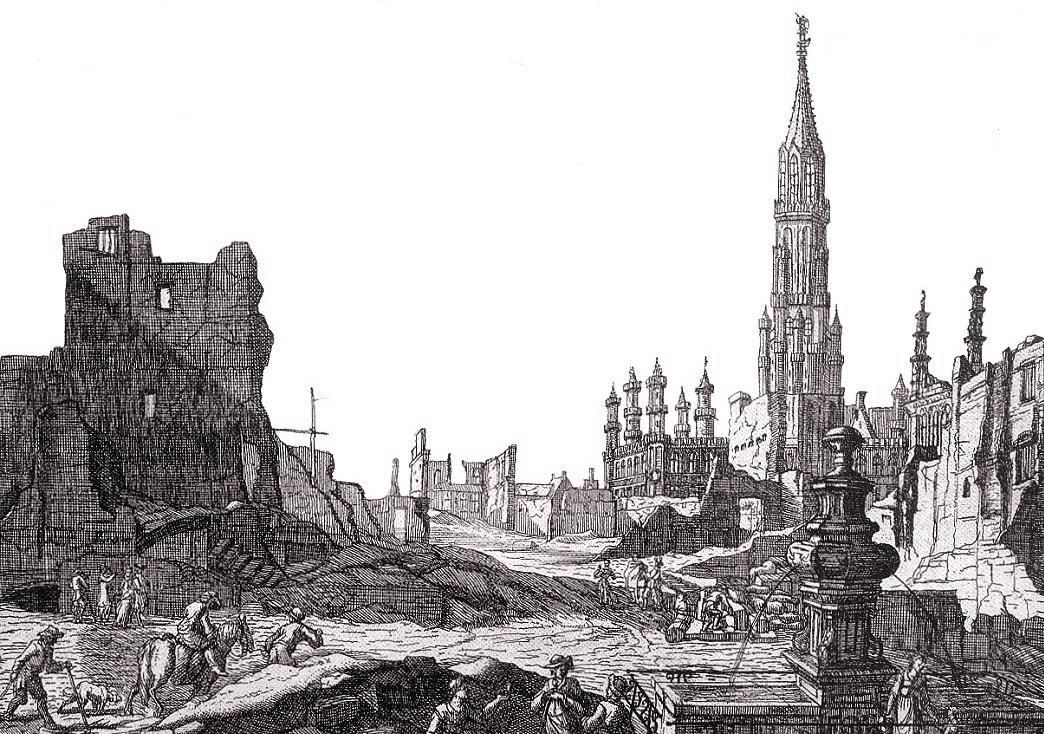
The Grand-Place after the 1695 bombardment by the French army

In the 16th and 17th centuries, Brussels was a centre for the lace industry. In addition, Brussels tapestry hung on the walls of castles throughout Europe. In 1695, during the Nine Years' War, King Louis XIV of France sent troops to bombard Brussels with artillery. Together with the resulting fire, it was the most destructive event in the entire history of Brussels. The Grand-Place was destroyed, along with 4,000 buildings—a third of all the buildings in the city. The reconstruction of the city centre, effected during subsequent years, profoundly changed its appearance and left numerous traces still visible today.

During the War of the Spanish Succession Brussels fell in Anglo-Dutch hands following the Battle of Ramillies in 1706. In 1708, Brussels again sustained a French attack, which it repelled. Following the Treaty of Utrecht in 1713, Spanish sovereignty over the Southern Netherlands was transferred to the Austrian branch of the House of Habsburg. This event started the era of the Austrian Netherlands. Brussels was captured by France in 1746, during the War of the Austrian Succession, but was handed back to Austria three years later. It remained with Austria until 1795, when the Southern Netherlands were captured and annexed by France, and the city became the chef-lieu of the department of the Dyle. The French rule ended in 1815, with the defeat of Napoleon on the battlefield of Waterloo, located south of today's Brussels-Capital Region. With the Congress of Vienna, the Southern Netherlands joined the United Kingdom of the Netherlands, under King William I of Orange. The former Dyle department became the province of South Brabant, with Brussels as its capital.

=== Late modern ===
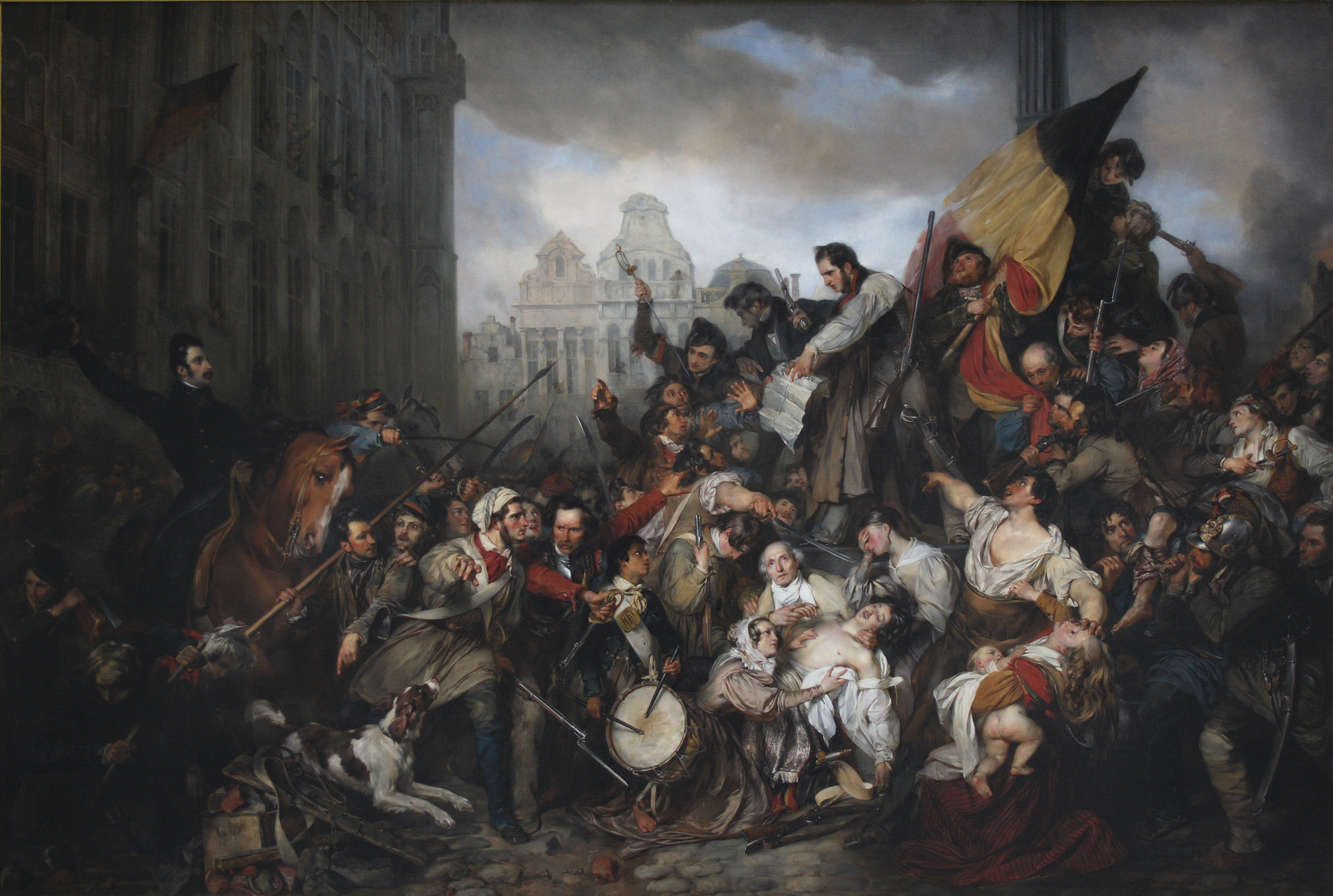
Episode of the Belgian Revolution of 1830, Gustaf Wappers, 1834

In 1830, the Belgian Revolution began in Brussels, after a performance of Auber's opera La Muette de Portici at the Royal Theatre of La Monnaie. The city became the capital and seat of government of the new nation. South Brabant was renamed simply Brabant, with Brussels as its administrative centre. On 21 July 1831, Leopold I, the first King of the Belgians, ascended the throne, undertaking the destruction of the city walls and the construction of many buildings.

Following independence, Brussels underwent many more changes. It became a financial centre, thanks to the dozens of companies launched by the Société Générale de Belgique. The Industrial Revolution and the opening of the Brussels–Charleroi Canal in 1832 brought prosperity to the city through commerce and manufacturing. The Free University of Brussels was established in 1834 and Saint-Louis University in 1858. In 1835, the first passenger railway built outside England linked the municipality of Molenbeek-Saint-Jean with Mechelen.

During the 19th century, the population of Brussels grew considerably; from about 80,000 to more than 625,000 people for the city and its surroundings. The Senne had become a serious health hazard, and from 1867 to 1871, under the tenure of the city's then-mayor, Jules Anspach, its entire course through the urban area was completely covered over. This allowed urban renewal and the construction of modern buildings of Haussmann-esque style along grand central boulevards, characteristic of central Brussels today. Buildings such as the Bourse Palace, the Palace of Justice and Saint Mary's Royal Church date from this period. This development continued throughout the reign of King Leopold II. The International Exposition of 1897 contributed to the promotion of the infrastructure. Among other things, the Palace of the Colonies, today's Royal Museum for Central Africa, in the suburb of Tervuren, was connected to the capital by the construction of the Avenue de Tervueren/Tervurenlaan, an 11 km-long (6.8 mi) grand alley.

Brussels was one of the major European centres of the Art Nouveau style in the 1890s and early 1900s. The architects Victor Horta, Paul Hankar, and Henry van de Velde, among others, were known for their designs, many of which survive today.

=== 20th century ===
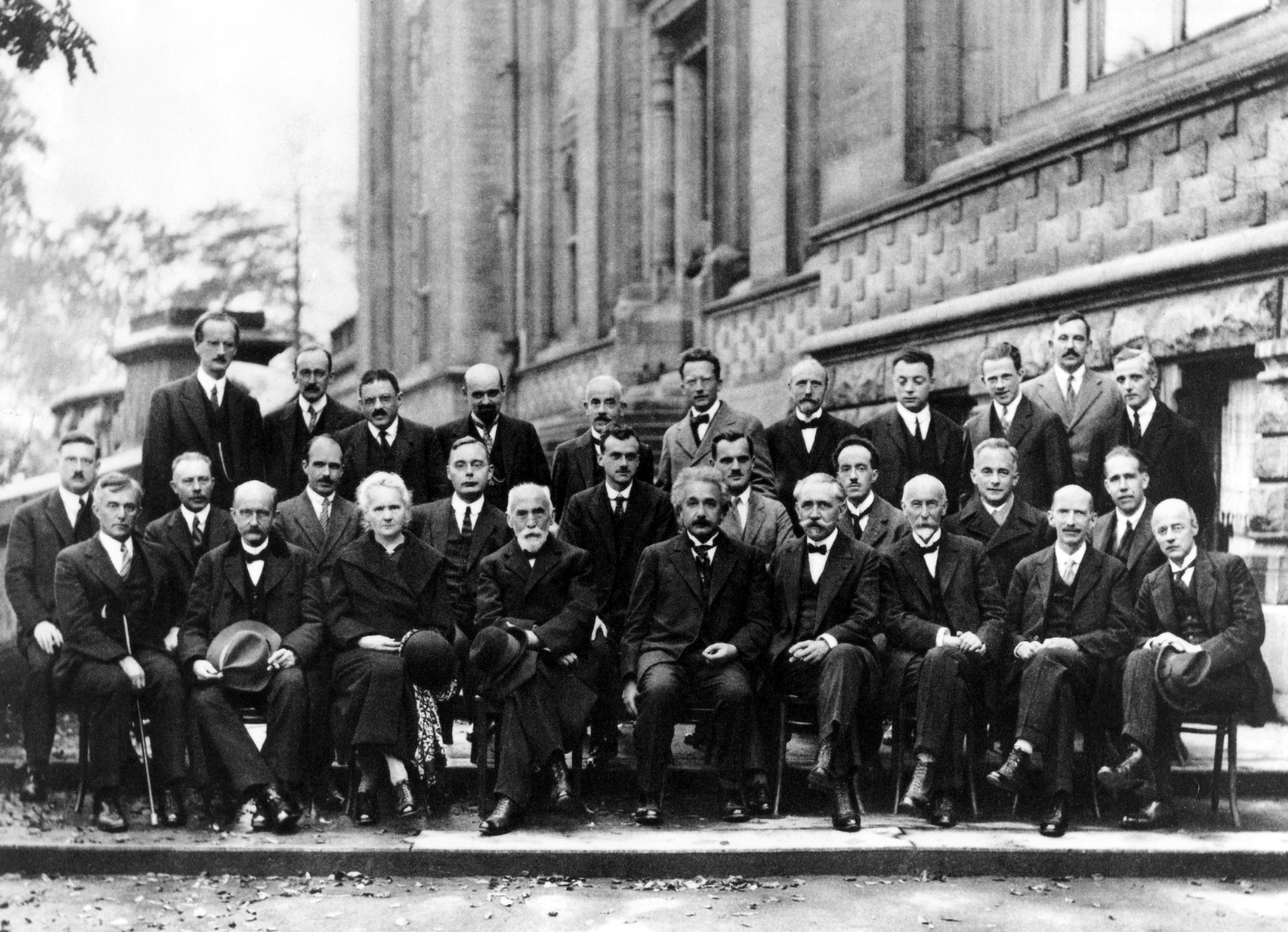
The 1927 Solvay Conference in Brussels was the fifth world physics conference.

During the 20th century, the city hosted various fairs and conferences, including the Solvay Conference on Physics and on Chemistry, and three world's fairs: the Brussels International Exposition of 1910, the Brussels International Exposition of 1935 and the 1958 Brussels World's Fair (Expo 58). During World War I, Brussels was an occupied city. It escaped large-scale destruction, although the interwar period would still see a significant amount of (re)construction. (Note: In 2014, 27,36% of the buildings in Brussels dated from this era.) In November 1918, after the German Revolution had broken out, Brussels was embroiled in street battles between revolutionary soldiers who wanted to end the occupation and their imperialist counterparts; additionally, explosives left behind by retreating German troops damaged infrastructure and around 2,300 houses.

During World War II, Brussels was occupied by German forces once again. While it was again spared major damage, a deadly bombing took place on 7 September 1943. It was carried out by the American airforce, which had tried to aim at SABCA facilities in Haren, but accidentally struck an area in Ixelles, killing 282 civilians. The city was liberated by the British Guards Armoured Division on 3 September 1944. Brussels Airport, in the suburb of Zaventem, traces its roots to a German military airport that was built in nearby Melsbroek.

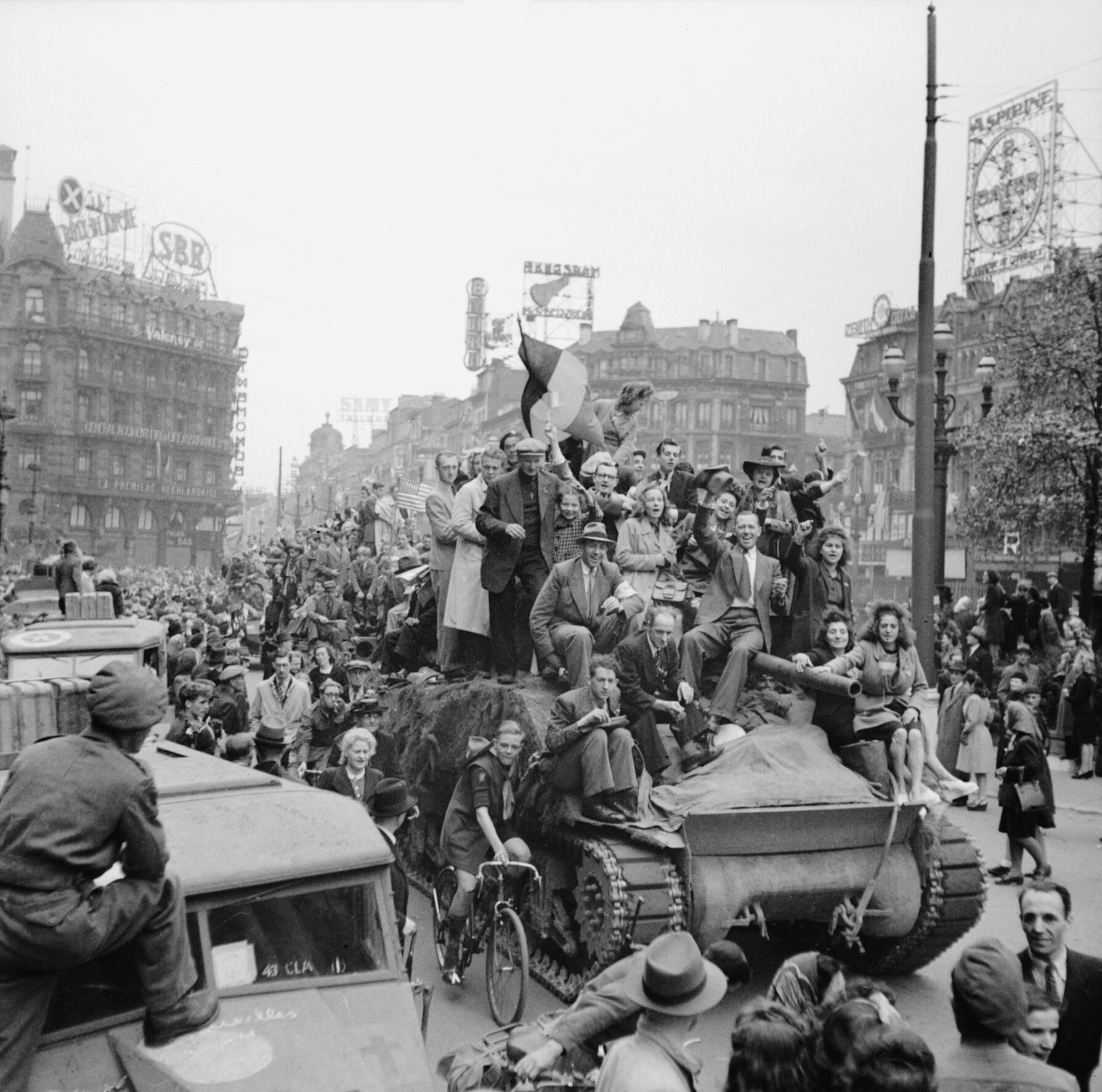
British tanks arrive in Brussels on 4 September 1944, ending the German occupation

After World War II, Brussels underwent extensive modernisation. The construction of the North–South connection, linking the main railway stations in the city, was completed in 1952, while the first premetro (underground tram) service was launched in 1969, and the first Metro line was opened in 1976. Starting from the early 1960s, Brussels became the de facto capital of what would become the European Union (EU), and many modern offices were built. Development was allowed to proceed with little regard to the aesthetics of newer buildings, and numerous architectural landmarks were demolished to make way for newer buildings that often clashed with their surroundings, giving name to the process of Brusselisation.

=== Contemporary ===
The Brussels-Capital Region was formed on 18 June 1989, after a constitutional reform in 1988. It is one of the three federal regions of Belgium, along with Flanders and Wallonia, and has bilingual status. The yellow iris is the region's emblem (referring to the presence of these flowers on the city's original site) and a stylised version is featured on its official flag.

In the 21st century, Brussels has become an important venue for international events. In 2000, it was named European Capital of Culture alongside eight other European cities. In 2013, the city was the site of the Brussels Agreement. In 2014, it hosted the 40th G7 summit, and in 2017, 2018 and 2021 respectively the 28th, 29th and 31st NATO Summits.

On 22 March 2016, three coordinated nail bombings were detonated by ISIL in Brussels—two at Brussels Airport in Zaventem and one at Maalbeek/Maelbeek metro station—resulting in 32 victims and three suicide bombers killed, and 330 people were injured. It was the deadliest act of terrorism in Belgium.

== Geography ==
=== Location and topography ===
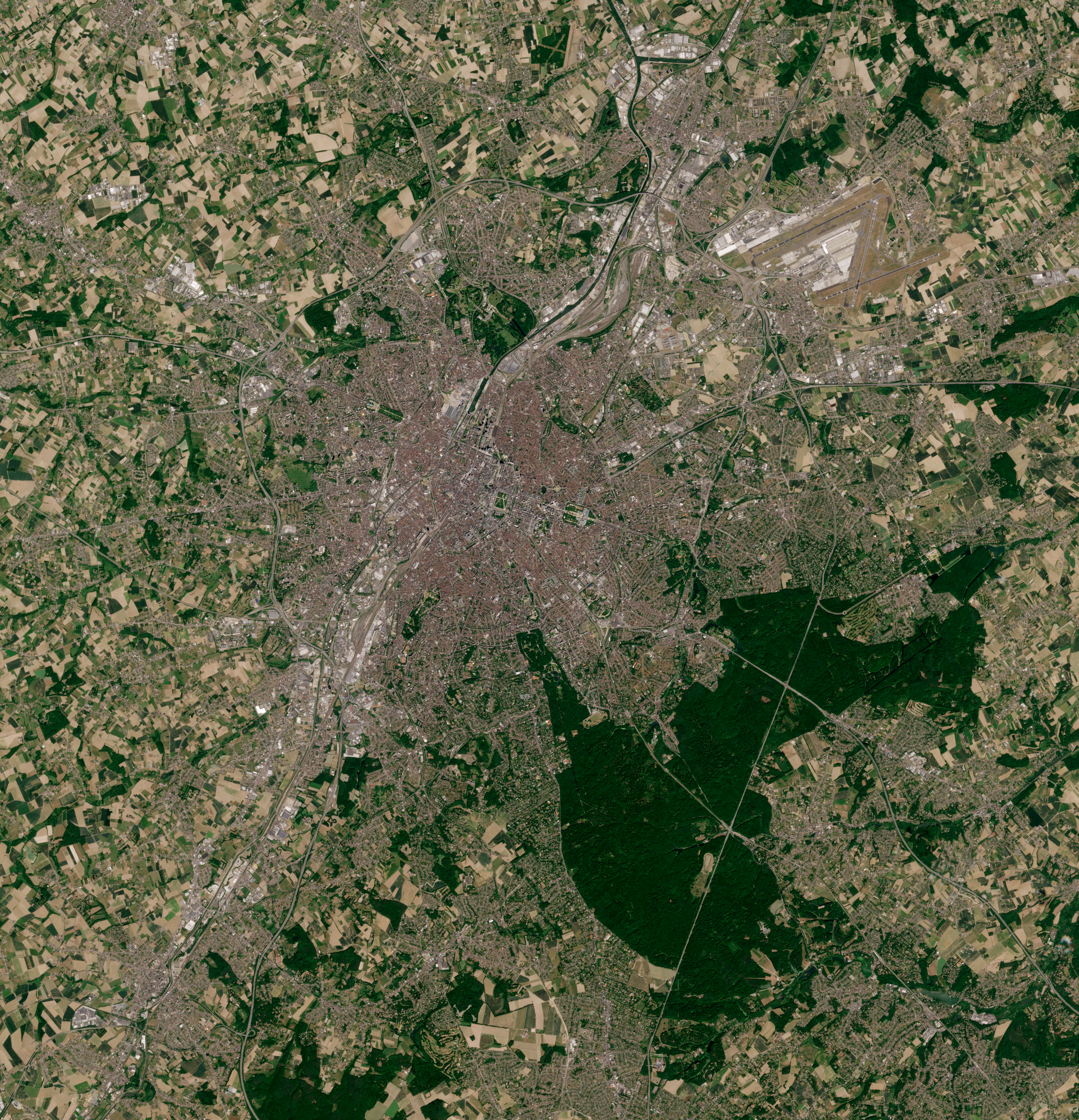
A 2020 satellite image of the Greater Brussels area

Brussels lies in the north-central part of Belgium, about 110 km (68 mi) from the Belgian coast and about 180 km (110 mi) from the country's southern tip. It is located in the heartland of the Brabantian Plateau, about 45 km (28 mi) south of Antwerp (Flanders), and 50 km (31 mi) north of Charleroi (Wallonia). Its average elevation is 57 m (187 ft) above sea level, varying from a low point in the valley of the almost completely covered Senne, which cuts the Brussels-Capital Region from east to west, up to high points in the Sonian Forest, on its southeastern side. In addition to the Senne, tributary streams such as the Maelbeek and the Woluwe, to the east of the region, account for significant elevation differences. Brussels' central boulevards are 15 m (49 ft) above sea level. Contrary to popular belief, the highest point (at 127.5 m (418 ft)) is not near the Place de l'Altitude Cent/Hoogte Honderdplein in Forest, but at the Drève des Deux Montages/Tweebergendreef in the Sonian Forest.

=== Climate ===
Brussels experiences an oceanic climate (Köppen: Cfb) with warm summers and cool winters. Proximity to coastal areas influences the area's climate by sending marine air masses from the Atlantic Ocean. Nearby wetlands also ensure a maritime temperate climate. On average (based on measurements in the period 1981–2010), there are approximately 135 days of rain per year in the Brussels-Capital Region. Snowfall is infrequent, averaging 17 days per year. The city also often experiences violent thunderstorms in the summer months.

Climate data for Uccle (Brussels-Capital Region), 1991–2020 normals
Month	Jan	Feb	Mar	Apr	May	Jun	Jul	Aug	Sep	Oct	Nov	Dec	Year
Record high °C (°F)	15.3 (59.5)	20.0 (68.0)	24.2 (75.6)	28.7 (83.7)	34.1 (93.4)	38.8 (101.8)	39.7 (103.5)	36.5 (97.7)	34.9 (94.8)	27.8 (82.0)	20.6 (69.1)	16.7 (62.1)	39.7 (103.5)
Mean maximum °C (°F)	12.5 (54.5)	13.5 (56.3)	18.2 (64.8)	23.1 (73.6)	26.9 (80.4)	30.1 (86.2)	32.1 (89.8)	31.8 (89.2)	27.6 (81.7)	22.3 (72.1)	16.4 (61.5)	12.6 (54.7)	33.1 (91.6)
Mean daily maximum °C (°F)	6.1 (43.0)	7.1 (44.8)	10.9 (51.6)	15.0 (59.0)	18.4 (65.1)	21.2 (70.2)	23.2 (73.8)	23.0 (73.4)	19.5 (67.1)	14.9 (58.8)	9.9 (49.8)	6.6 (43.9)	14.7 (58.4)
Daily mean °C (°F)	3.7 (38.7)	4.2 (39.6)	7.1 (44.8)	10.4 (50.7)	13.9 (57.0)	16.7 (62.1)	18.7 (65.7)	18.4 (65.1)	15.2 (59.4)	11.3 (52.3)	7.2 (45.0)	4.3 (39.7)	10.9 (51.7)
Mean daily minimum °C (°F)	1.4 (34.5)	1.5 (34.7)	3.5 (38.3)	6.0 (42.8)	9.2 (48.6)	12.0 (53.6)	14.1 (57.4)	13.9 (57.0)	11.3 (52.3)	8.1 (46.6)	4.6 (40.3)	2.1 (35.8)	7.3 (45.2)
Mean minimum °C (°F)	−5.1 (22.8)	−4.6 (23.7)	−1.9 (28.6)	0.9 (33.6)	4.8 (40.6)	8.1 (46.6)	10.6 (51.1)	10.3 (50.5)	7.1 (44.8)	3.0 (37.4)	−1.2 (29.8)	−3.9 (25.0)	−7.4 (18.7)
Record low °C (°F)	−21.1 (−6.0)	−18.3 (−0.9)	−13.6 (7.5)	−5.7 (21.7)	−2.2 (28.0)	0.3 (32.5)	4.4 (39.9)	3.9 (39.0)	0.0 (32.0)	−6.8 (19.8)	−12.8 (9.0)	−17.7 (0.1)	−21.1 (−6.0)
Average precipitation mm (inches)	75.5 (2.97)	65.1 (2.56)	59.3 (2.33)	46.7 (1.84)	59.7 (2.35)	70.8 (2.79)	76.9 (3.03)	86.5 (3.41)	65.3 (2.57)	67.8 (2.67)	76.2 (3.00)	87.4 (3.44)	837.2 (32.96)
Average precipitation days (≥ 0.1 mm)	18.9	16.9	15.7	13.1	14.7	14.1	14.3	14.3	14.1	16.1	18.3	19.4	189.9
Average snowy days	3.8	4.9	2.7	0.6	0.0	0.0	0.0	0.0	0.0	0.1	1.2	3.7	17
Average relative humidity (%)	84.1	80.6	74.8	69.2	70.2	71.3	71.5	72.4	76.8	81.5	85.1	86.6	77.0
Mean monthly sunshine hours	59.1	72.9	125.8	171.3	198.3	199.3	203.2	192.4	154.5	112.6	65.8	48.6	1,603.8
Average ultraviolet index	1	1	3	4	6	7	6	6	4	2	1	1	4
Source 1: Royal Meteorological Institute
Source 2: Weather Atlas; 2019 July record high from VRT NieuwsRoyal Meteorological Institute (KMI/IRM)

== As a capital ==
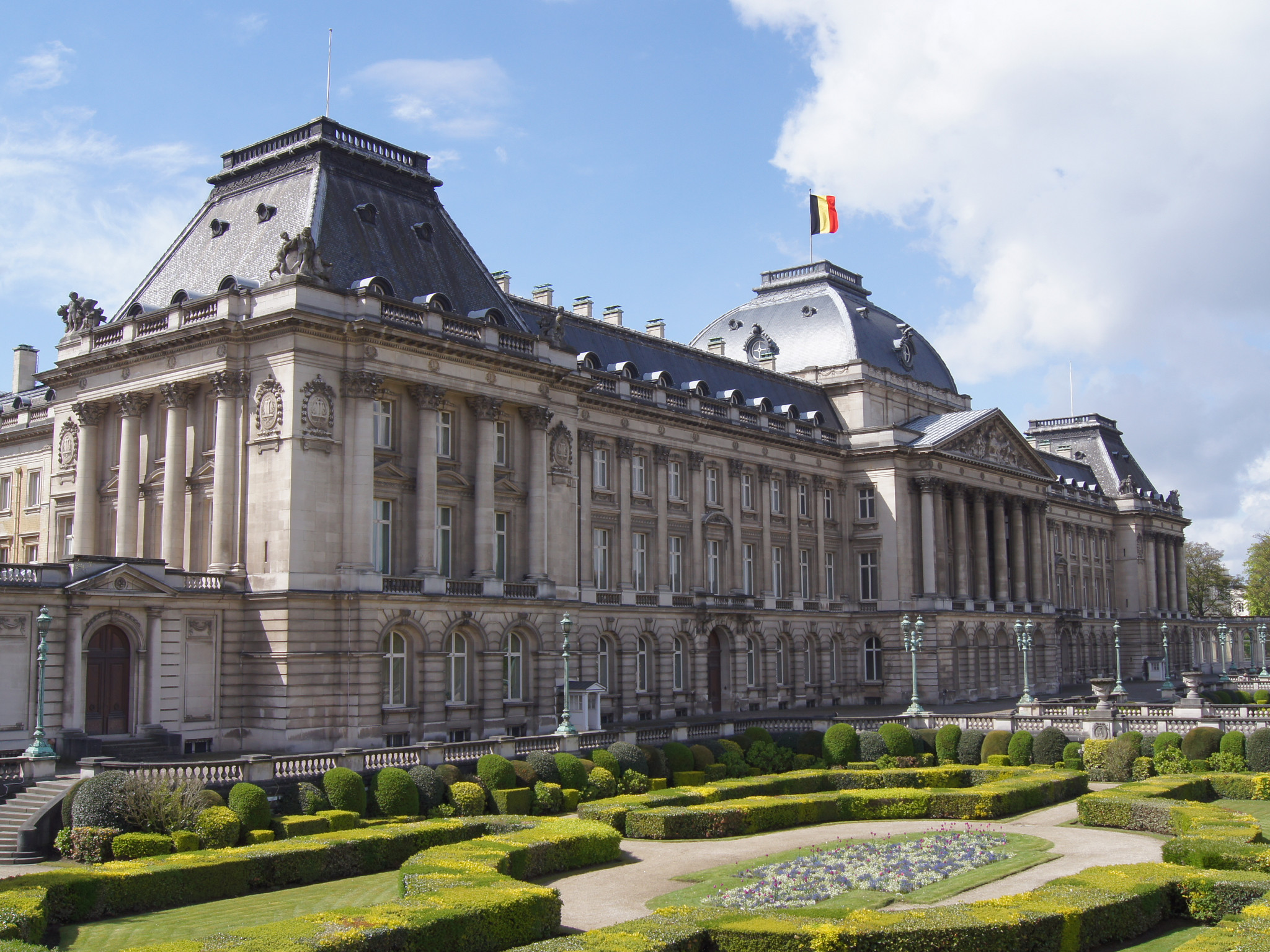
The Royal Palace of Brussels, the official palace of the King and Queen of the Belgians

Despite its name, the Brussels-Capital Region is not the capital of Belgium. Article 194 of the Belgian Constitution establishes that the capital is the City of Brussels, the municipality in the region that forms the city's core.

The City of Brussels is home to many national institutions. The Royal Palace of Brussels, where the King of the Belgians exercises his prerogatives as head of state, is situated alongside Brussels Park. (Note: Not to be confused with the Royal Palace of Laeken, the official home of the Belgian royal family.) On the opposite side of the park is the Palace of the Nation, the seat of the Belgian Federal Parliament. The office of the Prime Minister of Belgium, colloquially called Law Street 16 (French: 16, rue de la Loi, Dutch: Wetstraat 16), is located adjacent to this building. It is also where the Council of Ministers holds its meetings. The Court of Cassation, Belgium's supreme court, has its seat in the Palace of Justice. Other important institutions in the City of Brussels are the Constitutional Court, the Council of State, the Court of Audit, the Royal Belgian Mint and the National Bank of Belgium.

The City of Brussels is also the capital of both the French Community of Belgium and the Flemish Community. The Flemish Parliament and Flemish Government have their seats in Brussels, and so do the Parliament of the French Community and the Government of the French Community.

== Municipalities ==
Arms	French name	Dutch name
Anderlecht	Anderlecht	Anderlecht
Auderghem	Auderghem	Oudergem
Berchem-Sainte-Agathe	Berchem-Sainte-Agathe	Sint-Agatha-Berchem
Brussels	Bruxelles-Ville	Stad Brussel
Etterbeek	Etterbeek	Etterbeek
Evere	Evere	Evere
Forest, Belgium	Forest	Vorst
Ganshoren	Ganshoren	Ganshoren
Ixelles	Ixelles	Elsene
Jette	Jette	Jette
Koekelberg	Koekelberg	Koekelberg
Molenbeek-Saint-Jean	Molenbeek-Saint-Jean	Sint-Jans-Molenbeek
Saint-Gilles, Belgium	Saint-Gilles	Sint-Gillis
Saint-Josse-ten-Noode	Saint-Josse-ten-Noode	Sint-Joost-ten-Node
Schaerbeek	Schaerbeek	Schaarbeek
Uccle	Uccle	Ukkel
Watermael-Boitsfort	Watermael-Boitsfort	Watermaal-Bosvoorde
Woluwe-Saint-Lambert	Woluwe-Saint-Lambert	Sint-Lambrechts-Woluwe
Woluwe-Saint-Pierre	Woluwe-Saint-Pierre	Sint-Pieters-Woluwe

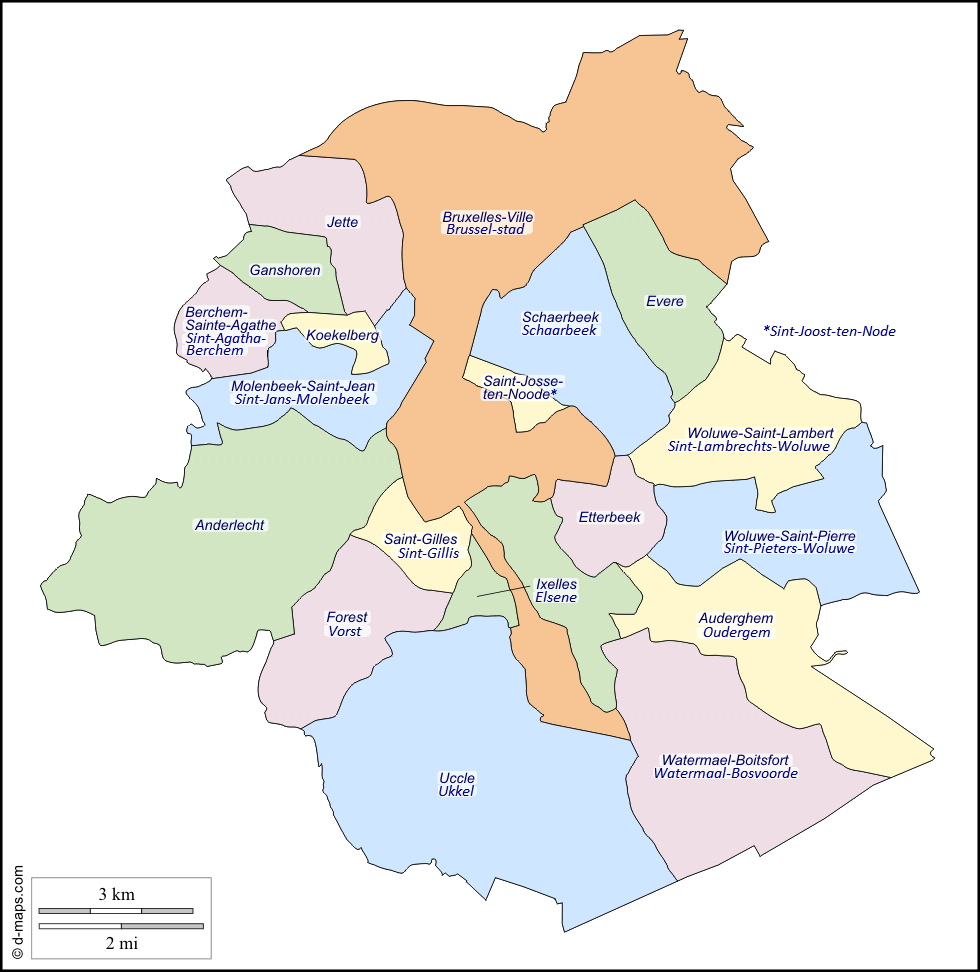

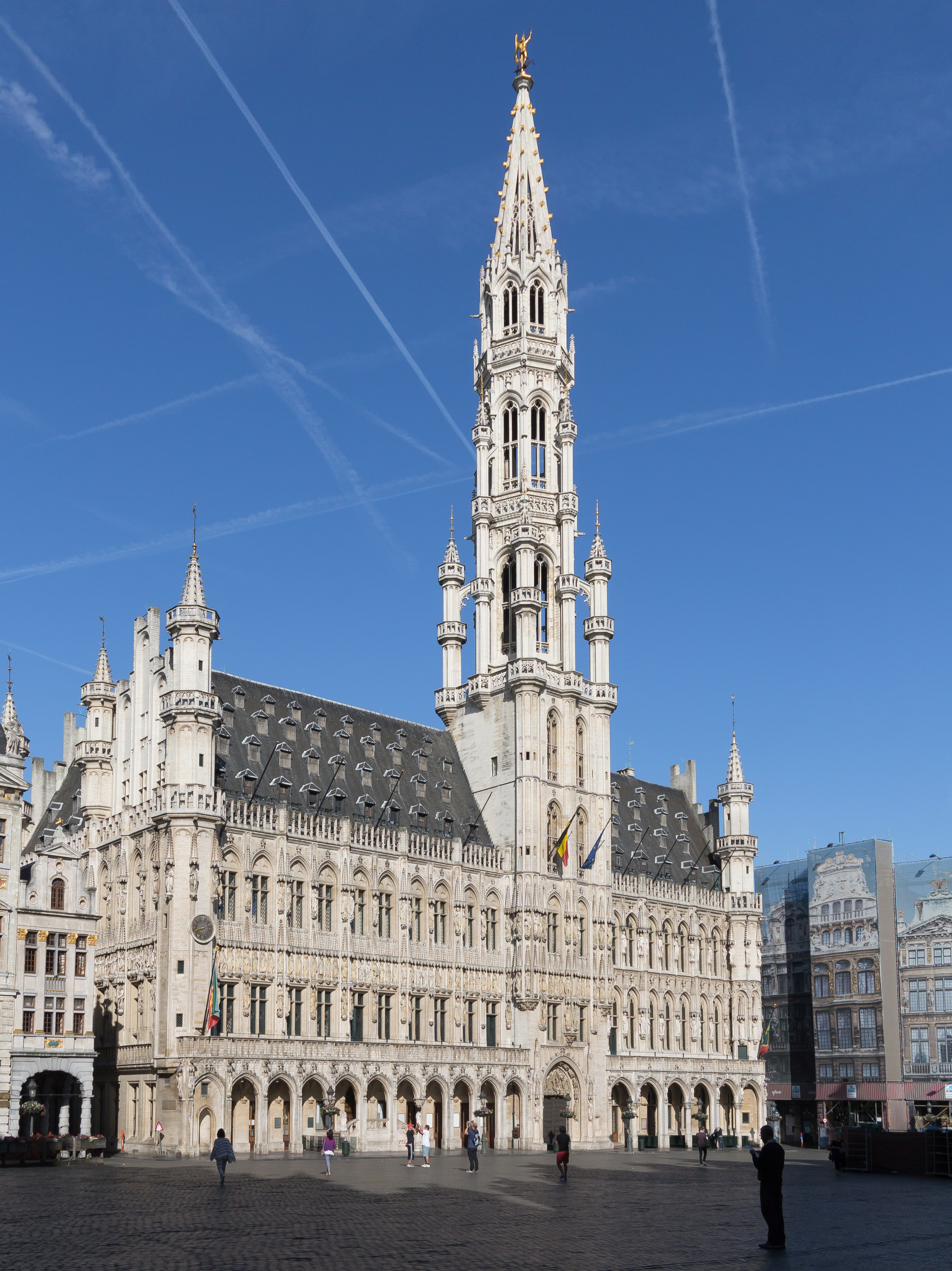
The Town Hall of the City of Brussels municipality

The 19 municipalities (French: communes, Dutch: gemeenten) of the Brussels-Capital Region are political subdivisions with individual responsibilities for the handling of local level duties, such as law enforcement and the upkeep of schools and roads within its borders. Municipal administration is also conducted by a mayor, a council, and an executive.

In 1831, Belgium was divided into 2,739 municipalities, including the 19 currently located in the Brussels-Capital Region. Unlike most of the municipalities in Belgium, the ones now located in the Brussels-Capital Region were not merged with others during mergers occurring in 1964, 1970, and 1975. However, a few neighbouring municipalities have been merged into the City of Brussels, including Laeken, Haren and Neder-Over-Heembeek in 1921. These comprise the northern bulge in the municipality. To the south-east is a strip of land along the Avenue Louise/Louizalaan that, in addition to the Bois de la Cambre/Ter Kamerenbos, was annexed from Ixelles in 1864. The Université libre de Bruxelles (ULB)'s Solbosch/Solbos campus is also located in part in the City of Brussels, partially accounting for the bulge at its south-eastern end.

The largest municipality in area and population is the City of Brussels, covering 33.09 km^{2} (12.8 sq mi) and with 198,314 inhabitants; the least populous is Koekelberg with 22,648 inhabitants. The smallest in area is Saint-Josse-ten-Noode, which is only 1.16 km^{2} (0.4 sq mi), but still has the highest population density in the region, with 23,486/km^{2} (60,830/sq mi). Watermael-Boitsfort has the lowest population density in the region, with 1,953/km^{2} (5,060/sq mi).

The division of the highly urbanised region into 19 municipalities is somewhat controversial, as most people consider it to be one city. Some politicians mock the "19 baronies" and advocate merging the municipalities under one city council and one mayor. This would reduce the number of politicians needed to govern Brussels, and centralise decision-making power, thus lowering the overall running costs. The current municipalities could be transformed into districts with limited responsibilities, similar to the current structure of Antwerp, or to structures of other capitals like the boroughs in London or arrondissements in Paris, to keep politics close to the citizen.

In the 2010s, Molenbeek-Saint-Jean gained international attention as the base for Islamist terrorists who carried out attacks in both Paris and Brussels.

== Brussels-Capital Region ==
Regions of Belgium: Flemish Region Brussels-Capital Region Walloon Region

=== Political status and administration ===
The Brussels-Capital Region is one of the three federated regions of Belgium, alongside the Walloon Region and the Flemish Region. Geographically and linguistically, it is a bilingual enclave in the monolingual Flemish Region. Regions are one component of Belgium's institutions; the three communities being the other component. Brussels' inhabitants deal with either the French Community or the Flemish Community for matters such as culture and education, as well as a Common Community for competencies that do not belong exclusively to either Community, such as healthcare and social welfare.

Upon the reorganisation and split of the Province of Brabant in 1995, the Brussels Region ceased to belong to any of the provinces of Belgium, nor was it subdivided into provinces itself. However, the Arrondissement of Brussels-Capital, whose borders coincide with the Brussels Region, continued to exist, and the areas of provincial jurisdiction were assumed by the newly created Governor of the Arrondissement of Brussels-Capital and the Brussels regional institutions and community commissions. In 2014, the office of the Governor was formally abolished and replaced in September 2015 by the office of the "High official of the Arrondissement of Brussels-Capital", who retained responsibility for crisis management and emergency planning, while responsibility for crime prevention was transferred to the Minister-President of the Brussels-Capital Region.

=== Institutions ===
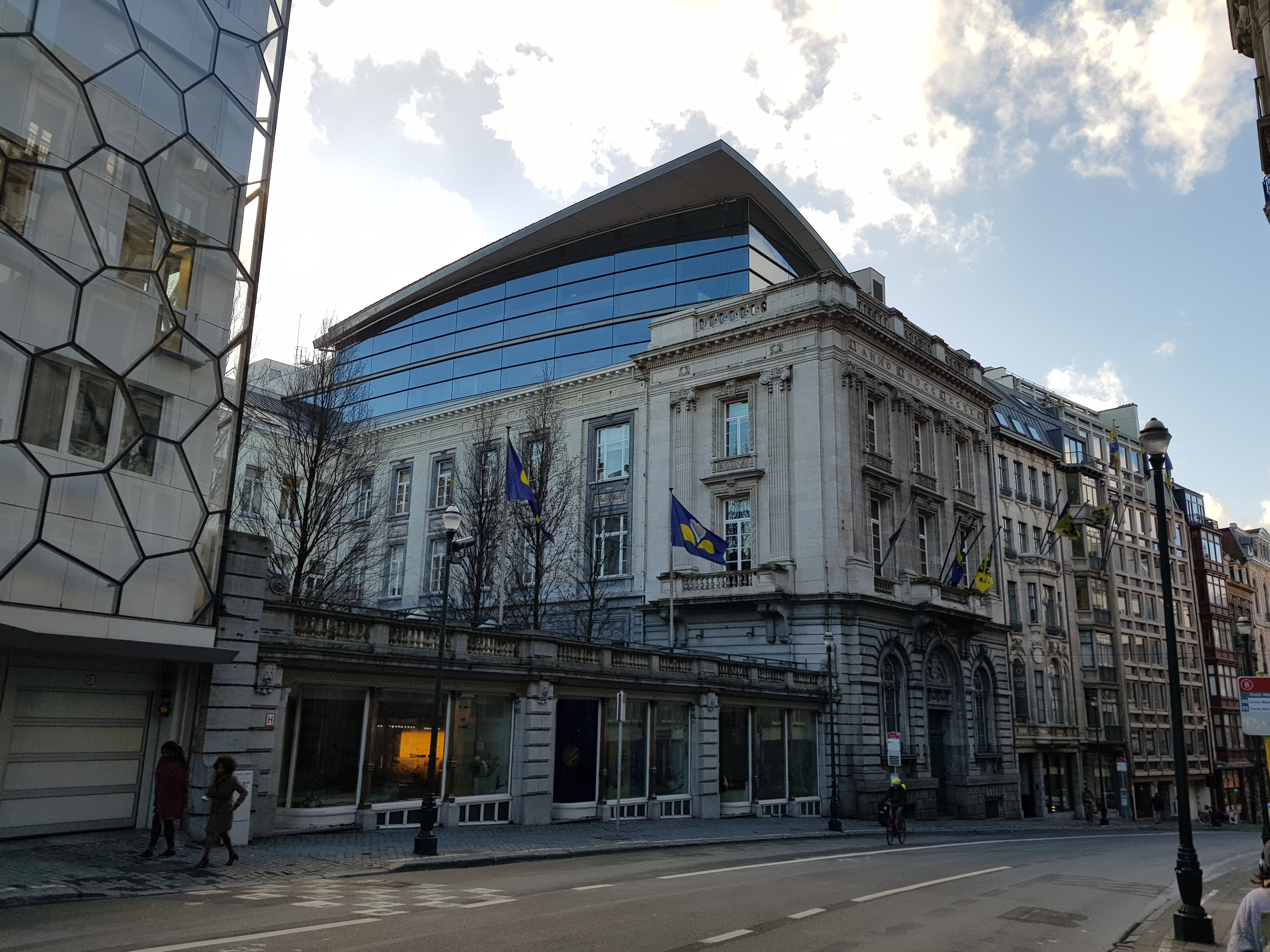
The Brussels Parliament building, housing the Brussels Regional Parliament

The Brussels-Capital Region is governed by a parliament of 89 members (72 French-speaking, 17 Dutch-speaking—parties are organised on a linguistic basis) and an eight-member regional cabinet consisting of a minister-president, four ministers and three state secretaries. The current government under Boris Dilliès comprises seven parties across the social democrat, green, liberal and conservative party spectrum. The coalition negotiations took almost two years, concluding 613 days after the elections and breaking the Belgian record for the longest time to form a government.

By law, the cabinet must comprise two French-speaking and two Dutch-speaking ministers, one Dutch-speaking secretary of state and two French-speaking secretaries of state. The minister-president does not count against the language quota, but in practice every minister-president has been a bilingual francophone. The regional parliament can enact ordinances (French: ordonnances, Dutch: ordonnanties), which have equal status as a national legislative act.

Nineteen of the 72 French-speaking members of the Brussels Parliament are also members of the Parliament of the French Community of Belgium, and, until 2004, this was also the case for six Dutch-speaking members, who were at the same time members of the Flemish Parliament. Now, people voting for a Flemish party have to vote separately for six directly elected members of the Flemish Parliament.

=== Agglomeration ===
Before the creation of the Brussels-Capital Region, regional competences in the 19 municipalities were performed by the Brussels Agglomeration. The Brussels Agglomeration was an administrative division established in 1971. This decentralised administrative public body also assumed jurisdiction over areas that, elsewhere in Belgium, were exercised by municipalities or provinces.

The Brussels Agglomeration had a separate legislative council, but the by-laws it enacted did not have legislative status. The only election of the council took place on 21 November 1971. The working of the council was subject to many difficulties caused by the linguistic and socio-economic tensions between the two communities.

After the creation of the Brussels-Capital Region, the Brussels Agglomeration was never formally abolished, although it no longer has a purpose.

== French and Flemish communities ==
Communities of Belgium: Flemish Community / Dutch language area Flemish & French Community / bilingual language area French Community / French language area German-speaking Community / German language area

The French Community and the Flemish Community exercise their powers in Brussels through two community-specific public authorities: the French Community Commission (French: Commission communautaire française or COCOF) and the Flemish Community Commission (Dutch: Vlaamse Gemeenschapscommissie or VGC). These two bodies each have an assembly composed of the members from each linguistic group in the Parliament of the Brussels-Capital Region. They also have a board composed of the ministers and secretaries of state from each linguistic group in the Government of the Brussels-Capital Region.

The French Community Commission also has another capacity: some of the French Community's legislative powers have been devolved to the Walloon Region (for the French language area of Belgium) and to the French Community Commission (for the bilingual language area). The Flemish Community, however, did the opposite; it merged the Flemish Region into the Flemish Community. This reflects the different approaches of the two linguistic groups, with one focusing more on the Communities and the other more on the Regions, resulting in asymmetrical federalism. Because of this devolution, the French Community Commission can enact decrees, which are legislative acts.

=== Common Community Commission ===
A bi-communitarian public authority, the Common Community Commission (French: Commission communautaire commune, COCOM, Dutch: Gemeenschappelijke Gemeenschapscommissie, GGC) also exists. Its assembly is composed of the members of the regional parliament, and its board are the region's ministers—not the secretaries of state—with the minister-president not having the right to vote. This commission has two capacities: it is a decentralised administrative public body, responsible for implementing cultural policies of common interest. It can award subsidies and enact by-laws. It can also enact ordinances, which have equal status as a national legislative act, in the field of community welfare. (Note: In the Brussels-Capital Region, both the French and the Flemish Communities can exercise powers in the field of welfare, but only in regard to unilingual institutions (for example, a private French-speaking retirement home or the Dutch-speaking hospital of the Vrije Universiteit Brussel).) Additionally, it is responsible for policies aiming directly at private persons or at bilingual institutions (for example, the social welfare centres of the 19 municipalities). Its ordinances have to be enacted with a majority in both linguistic groups. Failing such a majority, a new vote can be held, where a majority of at least one third in each linguistic group is sufficient.

== Brussels and the European Union ==
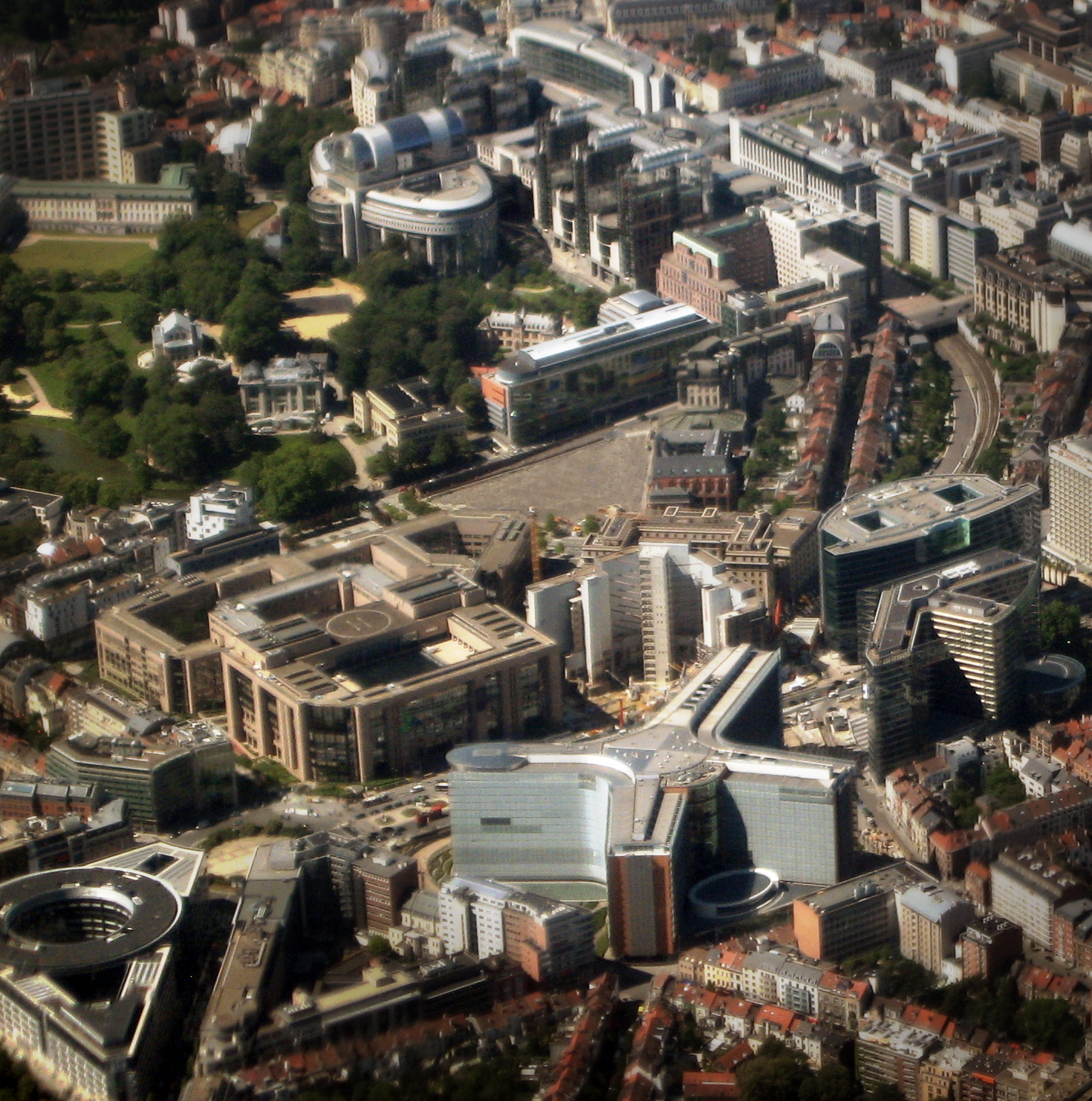
Aerial view of Brussels' European Quarter, hosting most of the EU institutions

Brussels serves as de facto capital of the European Union (EU), hosting the major political institutions of the Union. The EU has not declared a capital formally, though the Treaty of Amsterdam formally gives Brussels the seat of the European Commission (the executive branch of government) and the Council of the European Union (a legislative institution made up from executives of member states). It locates the formal seat of European Parliament in Strasbourg, where votes take place, with the council, on the proposals made by the Commission. However, meetings of political groups and committee groups are formally given to Brussels, along with a set number of plenary sessions. Three quarters of Parliament sessions now take place at its Brussels hemicycle. Between 2002 and 2004, the European Council also fixed its seat in the city. In 2014, the Union hosted a G7 summit in the city.

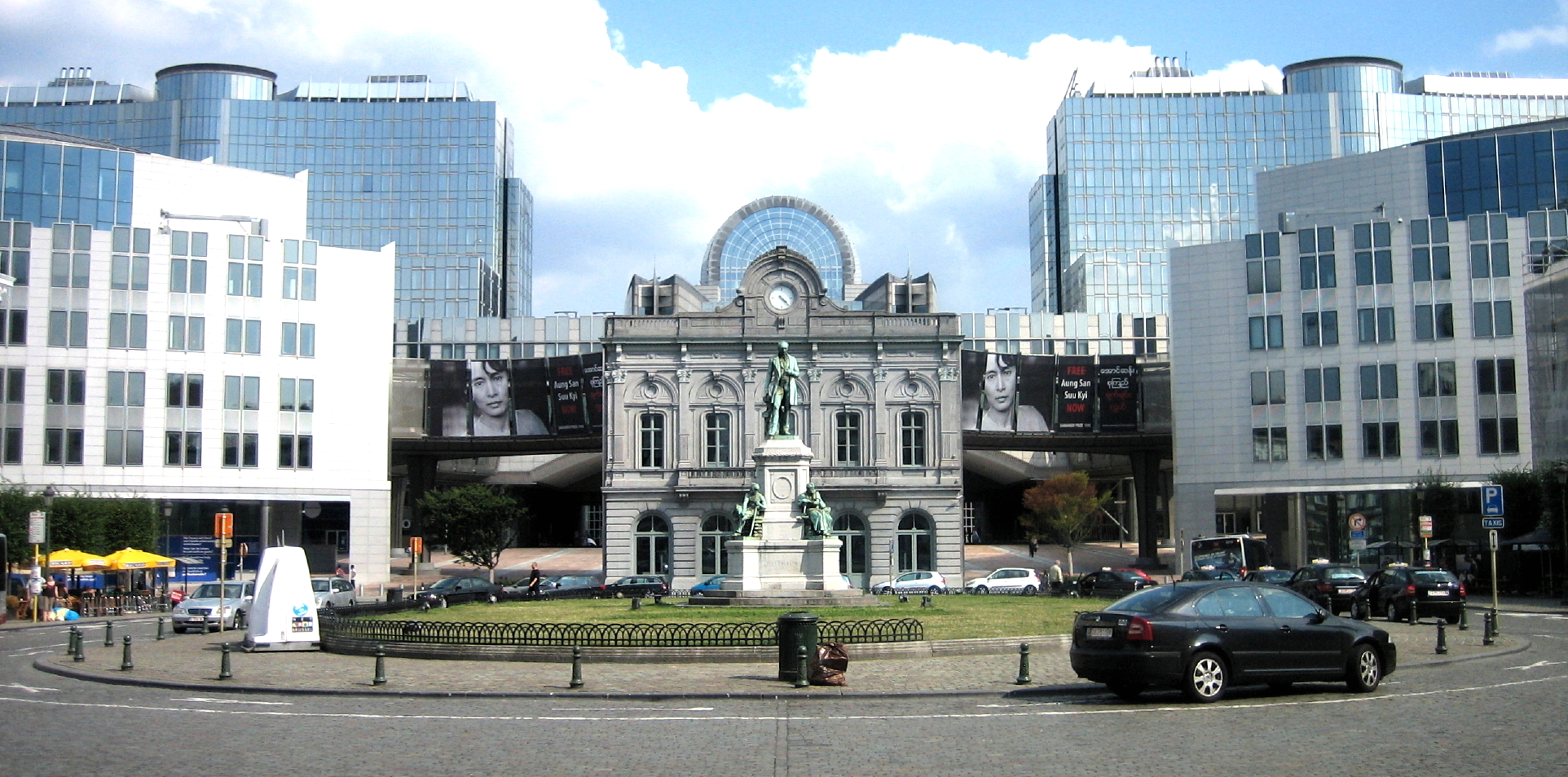
The Place du Luxembourg/Luxemburgplein with the European Parliament in the background

Brussels, along with Luxembourg and Strasbourg, began to host European institutions in 1957, soon becoming the centre of activities, as the Commission and Council based their activities in what has become the European Quarter, in the east of the city. Early building in Brussels was sporadic and uncontrolled, with little planning. The current major buildings are the Berlaymont building of the Commission, symbolic of the quarter as a whole, the Europa building of the Council and the Espace Léopold of the Parliament. In recent years, the presence has increased considerably, with the Commission alone occupying 865,000 m^{2} (9,310,000 sq ft) within the European Quarter (a quarter of the total office space in Brussels). The concentration and density has caused concern that the presence of the institutions has created a ghetto effect in that part of the city. However, the European presence has contributed significantly to the importance of Brussels as an international centre.

Brussels and the European Union

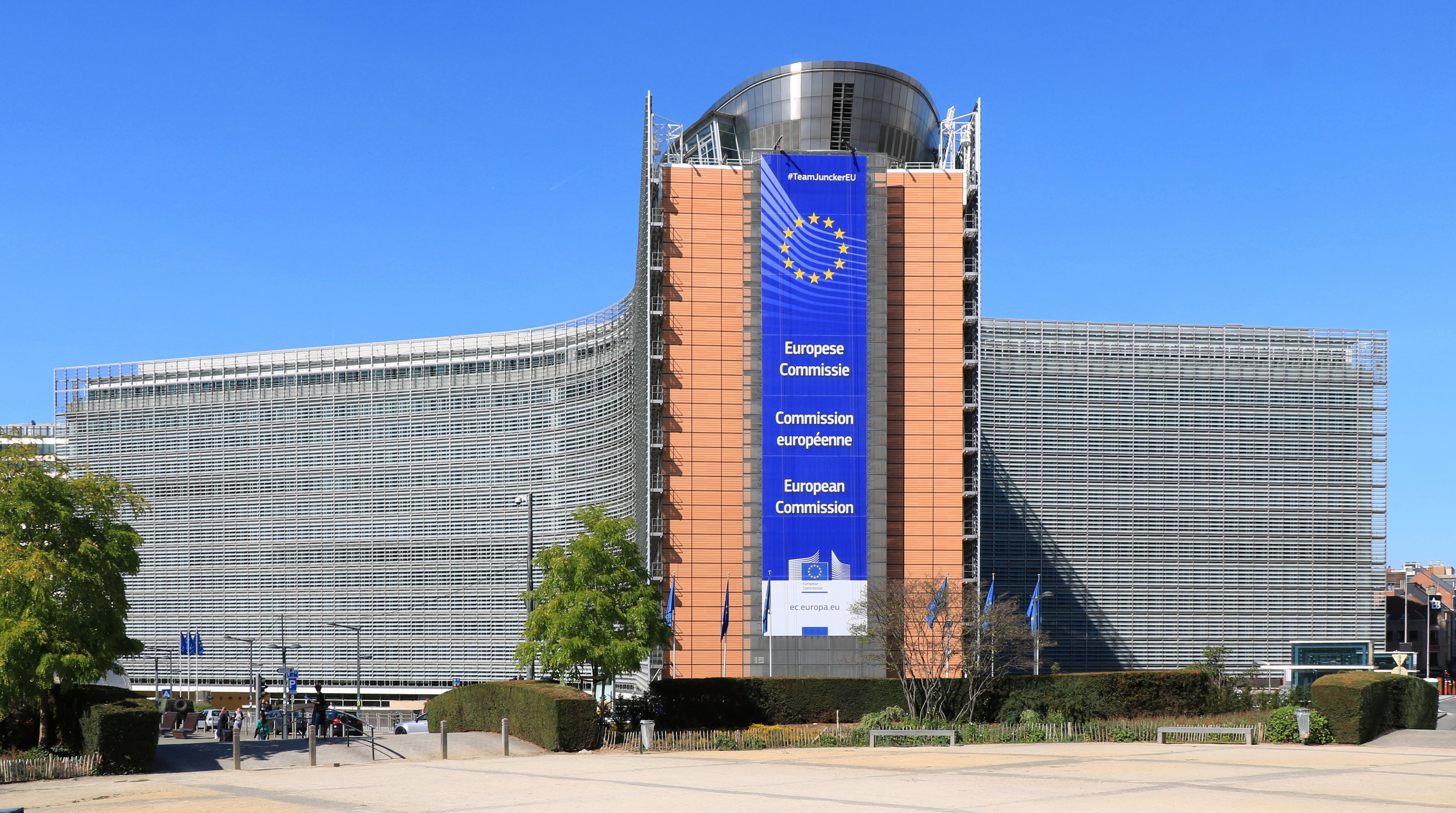
The Berlaymont building (European Commission)

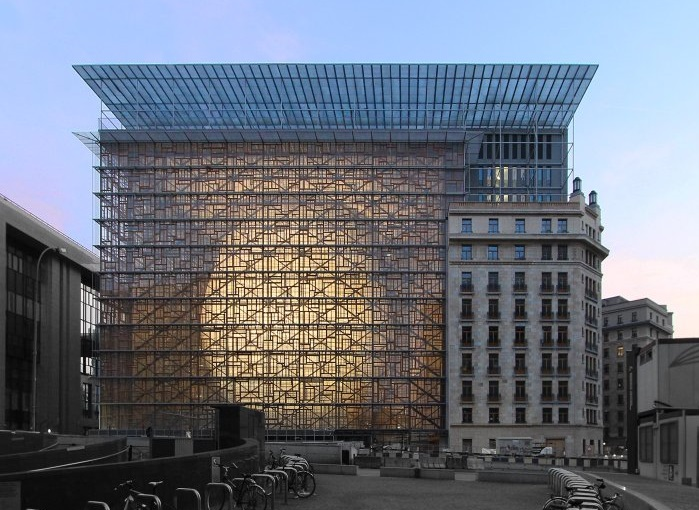
The Europa building (European Council)

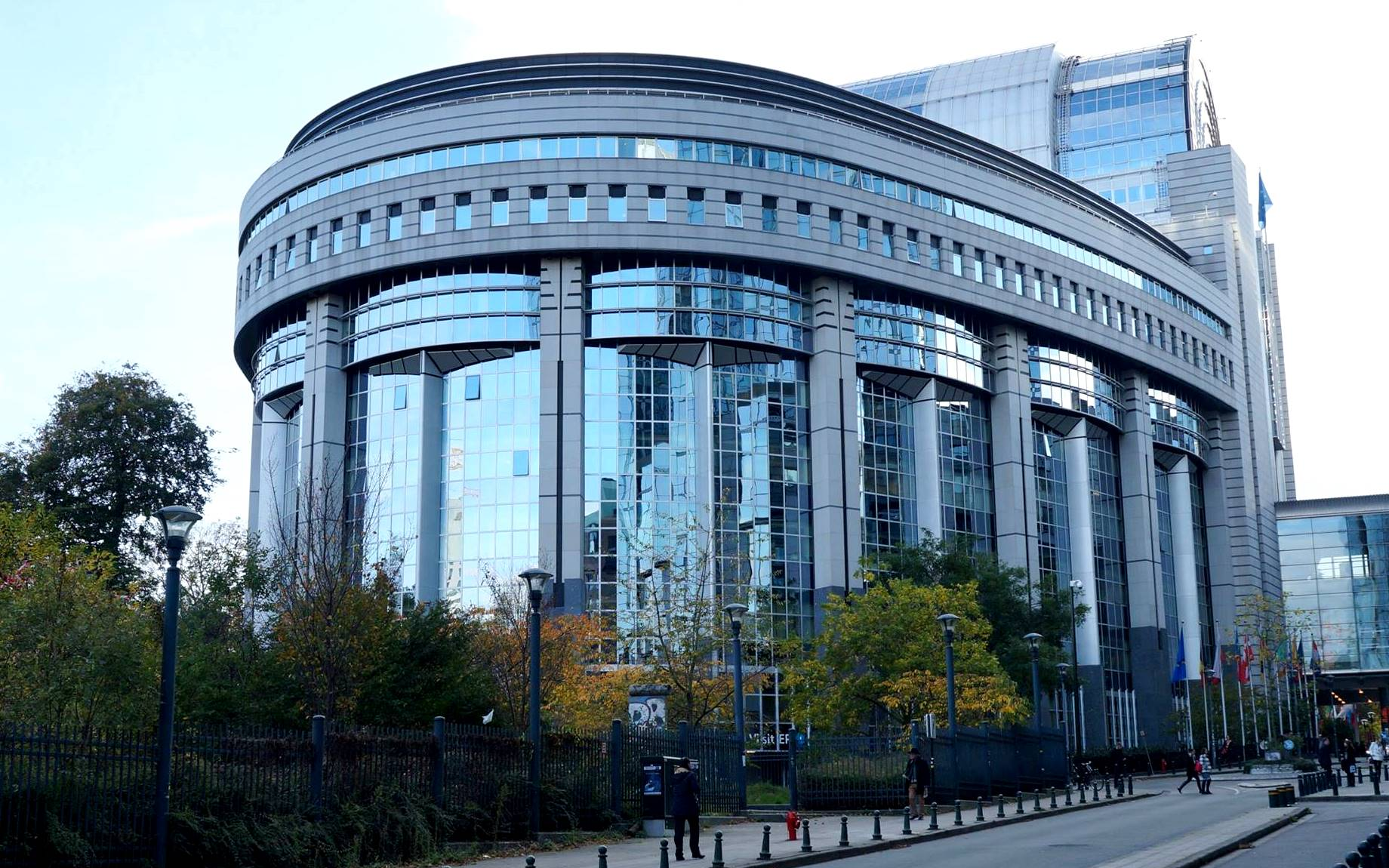
The Espace Léopold buildings (European Parliament)

== International institutions ==
Brussels has, since World War II, become the administrative centre of many international organisations. The city is the political and administrative centre of the North Atlantic Treaty Organization (NATO). NATO's Brussels headquarters houses 29 embassies and brings together over 4,500 staff from allied nations, their militaries, and civil service personnel. Many other international organisations such as the World Customs Organization and Eurocontrol, as well as international corporations, have their main institutions in the city. In addition, the main international trade union confederations have their headquarters there: the European Trade Union Confederation (ETUC), the International Confederation of Free Trade Unions (ICFTU) and the World Confederation of Labour (WCL).

Brussels is third in the number of international conferences it hosts, also becoming one of the largest convention centres in the world. The presence of the EU and the other international bodies has, for example, led to there being more ambassadors and journalists in Brussels than in Washington, D.C. The city hosts 120 international institutions, 181 embassies (intra muros) and more than 2,500 diplomats, making it the second centre of diplomatic relations in the world (after New York City). International schools have also been established to serve this presence. The "international community" in Brussels numbers at least 70,000 people. In 2009, there were an estimated 286 lobbying consultancies known to work in Brussels. Finally, Brussels has more than 1,400 NGOs.

=== North Atlantic Treaty Organization ===
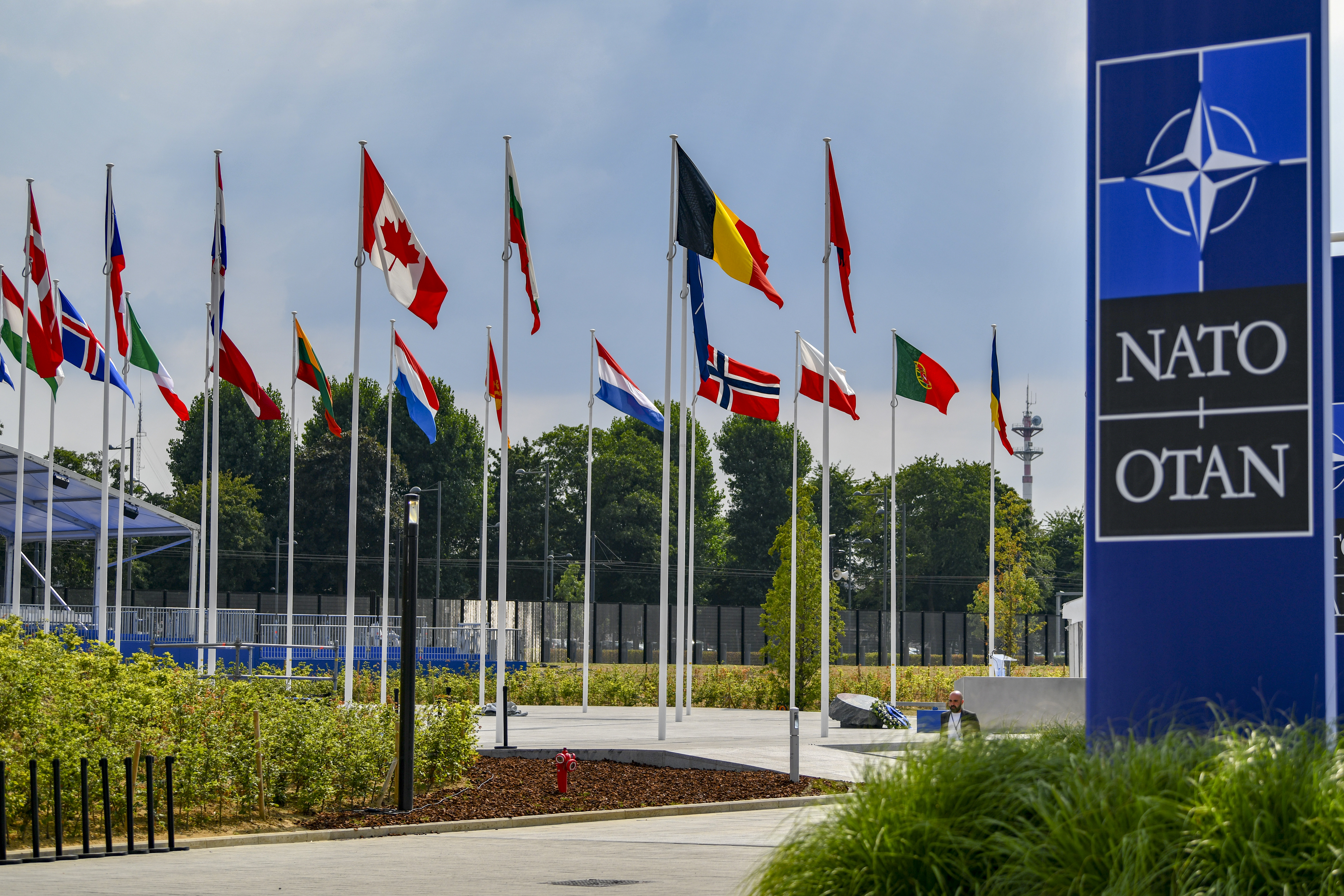
Flags of NATO member states wave at the entrance of NATO's headquarters in Haren

The Treaty of Brussels, which was signed on 17 March 1948 between Belgium, France, Luxembourg, the Netherlands and the United Kingdom, was a prelude to the establishment of the intergovernmental military alliance that later became the North Atlantic Treaty Organization (NATO). As of 2024, the alliance consists of 32 independent member countries across North America and Europe. Several countries also have diplomatic missions to NATO through embassies in Belgium. Since 1949, a number of NATO Summits have been held in Brussels, the most recent taking place in June 2021. The organisation's political and administrative headquarters are located on the Boulevard Léopold III/Leopold III-laan in Haren, on the north-eastern perimeter of the City of Brussels. A new €750 million headquarters building begun in 2010 and was completed in 2017.

== Demographics ==
=== Population ===
Population density of Europe. Brussels is located between the largest urban centres.

Brussels is located in one of the most urbanised regions of Europe, between Paris, London, the Rhine-Ruhr (Germany), and the Randstad (Netherlands). The Brussels-Capital Region has a population of around 1.2 million and has witnessed, in recent years, a remarkable increase in its population. In general, the population of Brussels is younger than the national average, and the gap between rich and poor is wider.

Brussels is the core of a built-up area that extends well beyond the region's limits. Sometimes referred to as the urban area of Brussels (French: aire urbaine de Bruxelles, Dutch: stedelijk gebied van Brussel) or Greater Brussels (French: Grand-Bruxelles, Dutch: Groot-Brussel), this area extends over a large part of the two Brabant provinces, including much of the surrounding arrondissement of Halle-Vilvoorde and some small parts of the arrondissement of Leuven in Flemish Brabant, as well as the northern part of Walloon Brabant.

The metropolitan area of Brussels is divided into three levels. Firstly, the central agglomeration (French: agglomération opérationnelle, Dutch: geoperationaliseerde agglomeratie) within the regional borders, with an official population of 1,255,795 inhabitants and an additional 125,000 non-registered people. Adding the closest suburbs (French: banlieues, Dutch: buitenwijken) gives a total population of 1,831,496. Including the outer commuter area (French: zone résidentielle des migrants alternants, Dutch: forensenwoonzone), the population is 2,676,701. Brussels is also part of a wider conurbation extending towards the cities of Ghent, Antwerp, and Leuven, known as the Flemish Diamond, as well as the province of Walloon Brabant, in total home to over 5 million people (a little more than 40% of Belgium's total population).

	1995	2000	2005	2010	2015	2020	2025
Brussels-Capital Region	951,546	959,318	1,006,749	1,089,538	1,175,173	1,218,255	1,255,795
-- of which non-Belgians	285,670	273,613	265,211	327,070	398,726	429,557	467,055

=== Nationalities ===
Nationalities of residents (2025)
Belgium	788,740
France	71,597
Romania	46,518
Italy	37,222
Spain	33,276
Morocco	32,699
Portugal	18,892
Poland	17,475
Ukraine	16,908
Bulgaria	13,044
Germany	11,634
Syria	10,976
Greece	10,384
Turkey	8,774
Netherlands	8,186
Other countries: India / 7,380; Democratic Republic of the Congo / 7,132; Brazil / 6,002; Guinea / 4,870; Cameroon / 4,411; United Kingdom / 3,928; Algeria / 3,182; Ireland / 3,015; Tunisia / 2,974; China / 2,961; United States / 2,815; Albania / 2,792; Hungary / 2,786; Japan / 2,477; Sweden / 2,393

There have been numerous migrations towards Brussels since the end of the 18th century, when the city acted as a common destination for political refugees from neighbouring or more distant countries, particularly France. From 1871, many of the Paris Communards fled to Brussels, where they received political asylum. Other notable international exiles living in Brussels at the time included Victor Hugo, Karl Marx, Pierre-Joseph Proudhon, Georges Boulanger, Paul Verlaine, Arthur Rimbaud, and Léon Daudet, to name a few. Attracted by the industrial opportunities, many workers moved in, first from the other Belgian provinces (mainly rural residents from Flanders) and France, then from Southern European, and more recently from Eastern European and African countries.

Since the second half of the 20th century, Brussels has been home to a large number of immigrants and émigré communities, as well as labour migrants, former foreign students or expatriates, and many Belgian families in Brussels can claim at least one foreign grandparent. According to Statbel (the Belgian Statistical Office), in 2020, taking into account the parents' nationality of birth, 74.3% of the population of the Brussels-Capital Region was of foreign origin and 41.8% was of non-European origin (including 28.7% of African origin). Among those aged under 18, 88% were of foreign origin and 57% of non-European origin (including 42.4% of African origin). By 2024, citizens of 186 different nationalities were living in Brussels. In 2025, of the region's 1,255,795 inhabitants, 788,740 (62.8%) were Belgian citizens, while 467,055 (37.2%) held a nationality other than Belgian. Citizens of other European Union member states formed the largest group of foreign nationals (291,627). The three municipalities with the most foreigners were Ixelles (51.0%), Etterbeek (49.8%), and Saint-Gilles (49.4%).

The large concentration of immigrants and their descendants includes many of Moroccan (mainly Riffian and other Berbers) and Turkish ancestry, together with French-speaking black Africans from former Belgian colonies, such as the Democratic Republic of the Congo. Many immigrants were naturalised following the great 1991 reform of the naturalisation process. Among all major migrant groups from outside the EU, a majority of the permanent residents have acquired Belgian nationality.

=== Languages ===
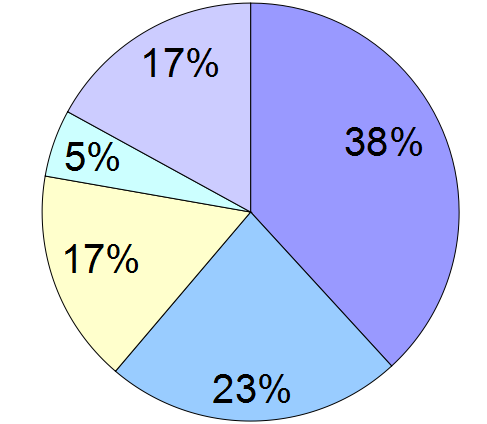
Languages spoken at home in the Brussels-Capital Region (2013) French French and Dutch Dutch French and other language Neither French nor Dutch

Brussels was historically Dutch-speaking, using the Brabantian dialect, but since the 19th century French has become the city's predominant language. The main cause of this transition was the rapid assimilation of the local Flemish population, amplified by immigration from France and Wallonia. The rise of French in public life gradually began by the end of the 18th century, quickly accelerating after Belgian independence. Dutch—of which standardisation in Belgium was still weak—could not compete with French, which was the exclusive language of the judiciary, the administration, the army, education, cultural life and the media, and thus necessary for social mobility. The value and prestige of the French language were universally acknowledged to such an extent that after 1880, and more particularly after the turn of the 20th century, proficiency in French among Dutch-speakers in Brussels increased spectacularly.

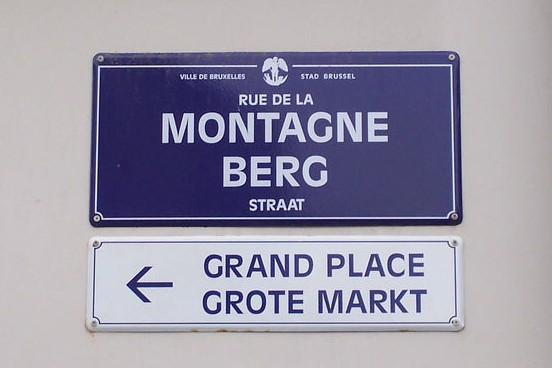
Bilingual French and Dutch street signs in Brussels

Although a majority of the population remained bilingual until the second half of the 20th century, family transmission of the historic Brabantian dialect declined, leading to an increase of monolingual French-speakers from 1910 onwards. From the mid-20th century, the number of monolingual French-speakers surpassed the number of mostly bilingual Flemish inhabitants. This process of assimilation weakened after the 1960s, as the language border was fixed, the status of Dutch as an official language of Belgium was reinforced, and the economic centre of gravity shifted northward to Flanders. However, with the continuing arrival of immigrants and the post-war emergence of Brussels as a centre of international politics, the relative position of Dutch continued to decline. Furthermore, as Brussels' urban area expanded, a further number of Dutch-speaking municipalities in the Brussels periphery also became predominantly French-speaking. This phenomenon of expanding Francisation—dubbed "oil slick" by its opponents—is, together with the future of Brussels, one of the most controversial topics in Belgian politics.

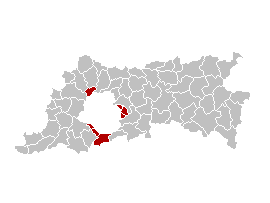
The municipalities with language facilities (in red) near Brussels

Since its creation in 1989, the Brussels-Capital Region has been legally bilingual, with both French and Dutch having official status, as is the administration of the 19 municipalities. The creation of this bilingual, full-fledged region, with its own competencies and jurisdiction, had long been hampered by different visions of Belgian federalism. Nevertheless, some communitarian issues remain. Flemish political parties demanded, for decades, that the Flemish part of Brussels-Halle-Vilvoorde (BHV) arrondissement be separated from the Brussels Region (which made Halle-Vilvoorde a monolingual Flemish electoral and judicial district). BHV was divided mid-2012. The French-speaking population regards the language border as artificial and demands the extension of the bilingual region to at least all six municipalities with language facilities in the surroundings of Brussels. (Note: The six municipalities with language facilities around Brussels are Wemmel, Kraainem, Wezembeek-Oppem, Sint-Genesius-Rode, Linkebeek and Drogenbos.) Flemish politicians have strongly rejected these proposals.

Advanced language knowledge
	2024	2001
French	81%	96%
English	47%	33%
Dutch	22%	33%
Spanish	15%	7%
Arabic	12%	10%
German	6%	7%
Italian	6%	5%
Portuguese	3%	1%
Turkish	3%	3%
Romanian	2%	-
Polish	1%	-
Greek	1%	-
Lingala	1%	-

Owing to migration and to its international role, Brussels is home to a large number of native speakers of languages other than French or Dutch. In 2024, 104 different languages were spoken by residents (72 in 2001). French was spoken "well to perfectly" by 81% (down from 96% in 2001) of the population, while for Dutch this percentage was only 22% (down from 33% in 2001), and advanced knowledge of English reached 47% (up from 33% in 2001). 29% of residents grew up in a household where neither Dutch nor French was spoken (20% in 2001), while a further 18% (9% in 2001) grew up speaking at least another foreign language (except Dutch) alongside French. Despite the rise of English as a second language in Brussels, including as an unofficial compromise language between French and Dutch, as well as the working language for some of its international businesses and institutions, French remains the lingua franca and all public services are conducted exclusively in French or Dutch.

The original dialect of Brussels (known as Brusselian, and also sometimes referred to as Marollian), a form of Brabantic (the variant of Dutch spoken in the old Duchy of Brabant) with a significant number of loanwords from French, still survives among a small minority of inhabitants called Brusseleers (or Brusseleirs), many of them quite bi- and multilingual. The ethnic and linguistic self-identification of Brussels' inhabitants can be distinct from the French and Dutch-speaking communities. For French-speakers, it can vary from Francophone Belgian, Bruxellois (French demonym for a local inhabitant), Walloon (for people who migrated from the Walloon Region); for Flemings, it is mainly either Dutch-speaking Belgian, Flemish or Brusselaar (Dutch demonym for an inhabitant), and often both. For Brusseleers, many simply consider themselves as belonging to Brussels.

Since 2021, the Brussels-Capital Region has recognised the Brussels regional languages, such as Bargoens, Beulemans, Flemish Brusselian and Marollian, as intangible cultural heritage.

=== Religions ===
Religions in the Brussels-Capital Region (2016)
1. Catholicism (40.0%)
2. Islam (23.0%)
3. Protestantism (3.00%)
4. Other religions (4.00%)
5. Non-religious (30.0%)

Historically, Brussels has been predominantly Catholic, especially since the expulsion of Protestants in the 16th century. This is clear from the large number of historical churches in the region, particularly in the City of Brussels. The pre-eminent Catholic cathedral in Brussels is the Cathedral of St. Michael and St. Gudula, serving as the co-cathedral of the Archdiocese of Mechelen–Brussels. On the north-western side of the region, the National Basilica of the Sacred Heart is a Minor Basilica and parish church, as well as one of the largest churches by area in the world. The Church of Our Lady of Laeken holds the tombs of many members of the Belgian royal family, including all the former Belgian monarchs, within the Royal Crypt.

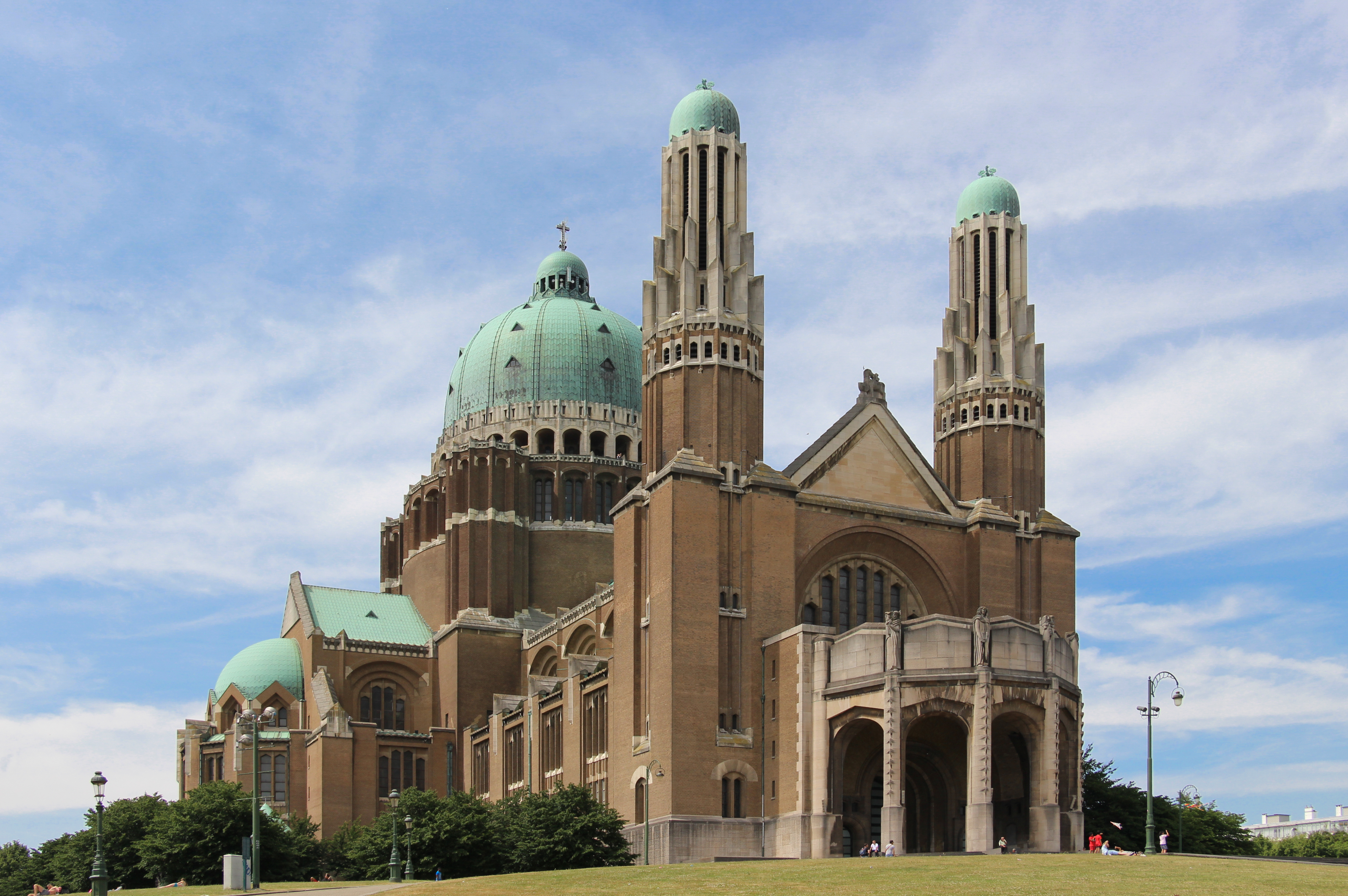
The National Basilica of the Sacred Heart in Koekelberg

In reflection of its multicultural makeup, Brussels hosts a variety of religious communities, as well as large numbers of atheists and agnostics. Minority faiths include Islam, Anglicanism, Eastern Orthodoxy, Judaism, and Buddhism. According to a 2016 survey, approximately 40% of residents of Brussels declared themselves Catholics (12% were practising Catholics and 28% were non-practising Catholics), 30% were non-religious, 23% were Muslim (19% practising, 4% non-practising), 3% were Protestants and 4% were of another religion.

As guaranteed by Belgian law, recognised religions and non-religious philosophical organisations (French: organisations laïques, Dutch: vrijzinnige levensbeschouwelijke organisaties) enjoy public funding and school courses. It was once the case that every pupil in an official school from 6 to 18 years old had to choose two hours per week of compulsory religious—or non-religious-inspired morals—courses. However, in 2015, the Belgian Constitutional Court ruled religious studies could no longer be required in the primary and secondary educational systems.

Brussels has a large concentration of Muslims, mostly of Moroccan, Turkish, Syrian and Guinean ancestry. The Great Mosque of Brussels, located in the Parc du Cinquantenaire/Jubelpark, is the oldest mosque in Brussels and the former seat of the Islamic and Cultural Centre of Belgium. Belgium does not collect statistics by ethnic background or religious beliefs, so exact figures are unknown. It was estimated that, in 2005, people of Muslim background living in the Brussels Region numbered 256,220 and accounted for 25.5% of the city's population, a much higher concentration than those of the other regions of Belgium.

Regions of Belgium (1 January 2016)	Total population	People of Muslim origin	% of Muslims
Belgium	11,371,928	603,642	5.3%
Brussels-Capital Region	1,180,531	212,495	18%
Wallonia	3,395,942	149,421	4.4%
Flanders	6,043,161	241,726	4.0%

== Architecture ==
The architecture of Brussels is diverse, and spans from the clashing combination of Gothic, Baroque, and Louis XIV styles on the Grand-Place to the postmodern buildings of the EU institutions.

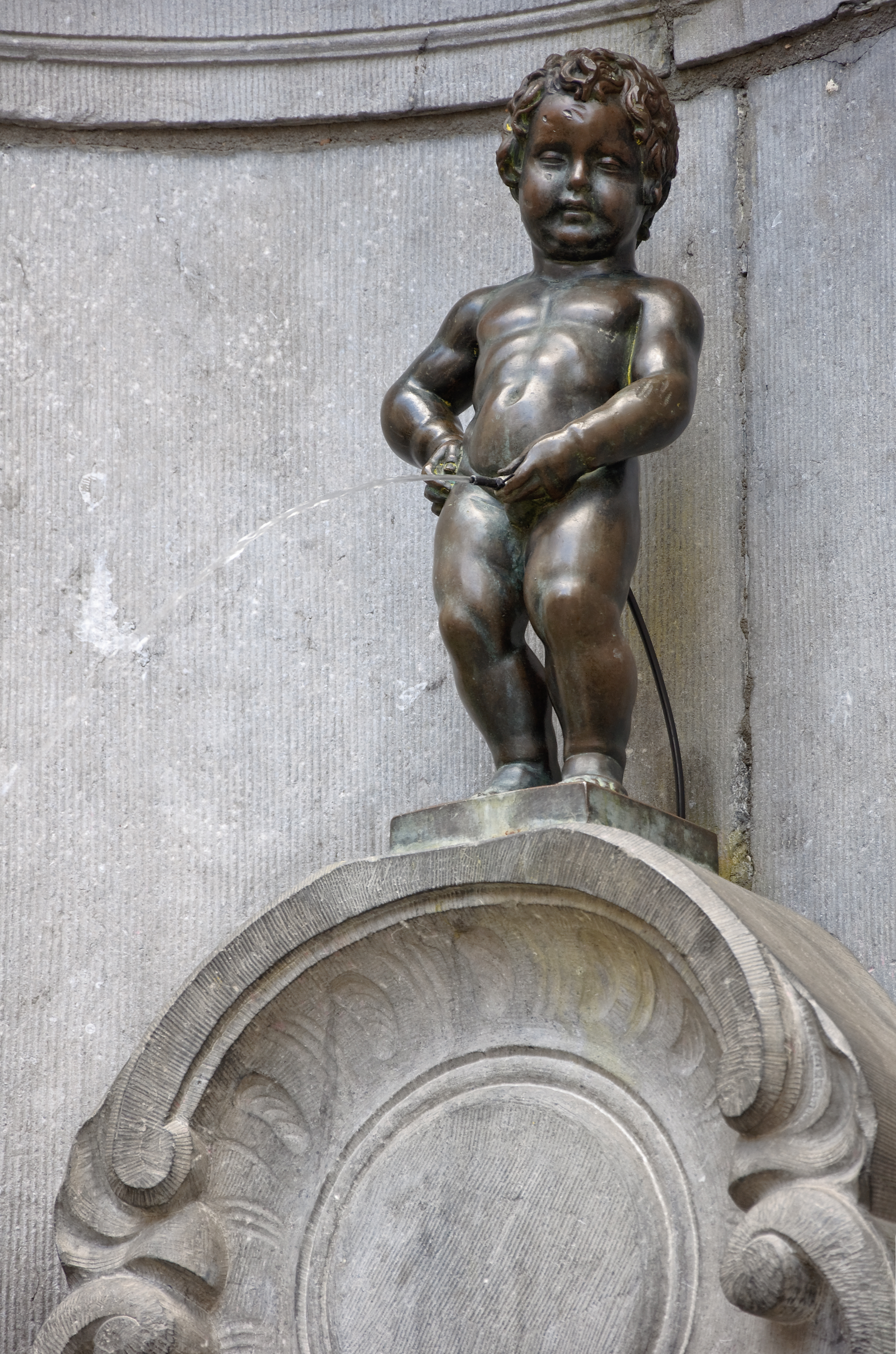
Manneken Pis, a well-known public sculpture

Very little medieval architecture has survived, although examples remain in the historical centre (called the Îlot Sacré), Saint Géry/Sint-Goriks and Sainte-Catherine/Sint Katelijne neighbourhoods. The Brabantine Gothic Cathedral of St. Michael and St. Gudula remains a prominent feature in the skyline of central Brussels. Isolated portions of the first city walls were saved from destruction and can be seen to this day, while the Halle Gate is one of the only remains of the second walls. The Grand-Place is the main attraction in the city centre and is a UNESCO World Heritage Site. The square is dominated by the Flamboyant Town Hall, the neo-Gothic King's House or Bread House, and the Baroque guildhalls of the former Guilds of Brussels. Manneken Pis, a fountain containing a small bronze sculpture of a urinating youth, is a tourist attraction and symbol of the city.

The Grand-Place of Brussels, a UNESCO World Heritage Site

Neoclassical architecture is prominent in the Royal Quarter or Coudenberg/Koudenberg area, around Brussels Park and the Place Royale/Koningsplein. Examples include the Royal Palace, the Church of St. James on Coudenberg, the Palace of the Nation (Parliament building), the Academy Palace, the Palace of Charles of Lorraine, the Palace of the Count of Flanders, and the Egmont Palace. Other uniform neoclassical ensembles can be found around the Place des Martyrs/Martelaarsplein and the Place des Barricades/Barricadenplein. Additional landmarks in the centre include the Royal Saint-Hubert Galleries, the Congress Column, the Bourse Palace, and the Palace of Justice. The latter, designed by Joseph Poelaert in eclectic style, is reputed to be the largest building constructed in the 19th century. Outside the historical centre, bordering the European Quarter, lie the Parc du Cinquantenaire/Jubelpark with its memorial arcade and museums, and in Laeken, the Royal Palace of Laeken and the Royal Domain with its large greenhouses, as well as the Museums of the Far East.

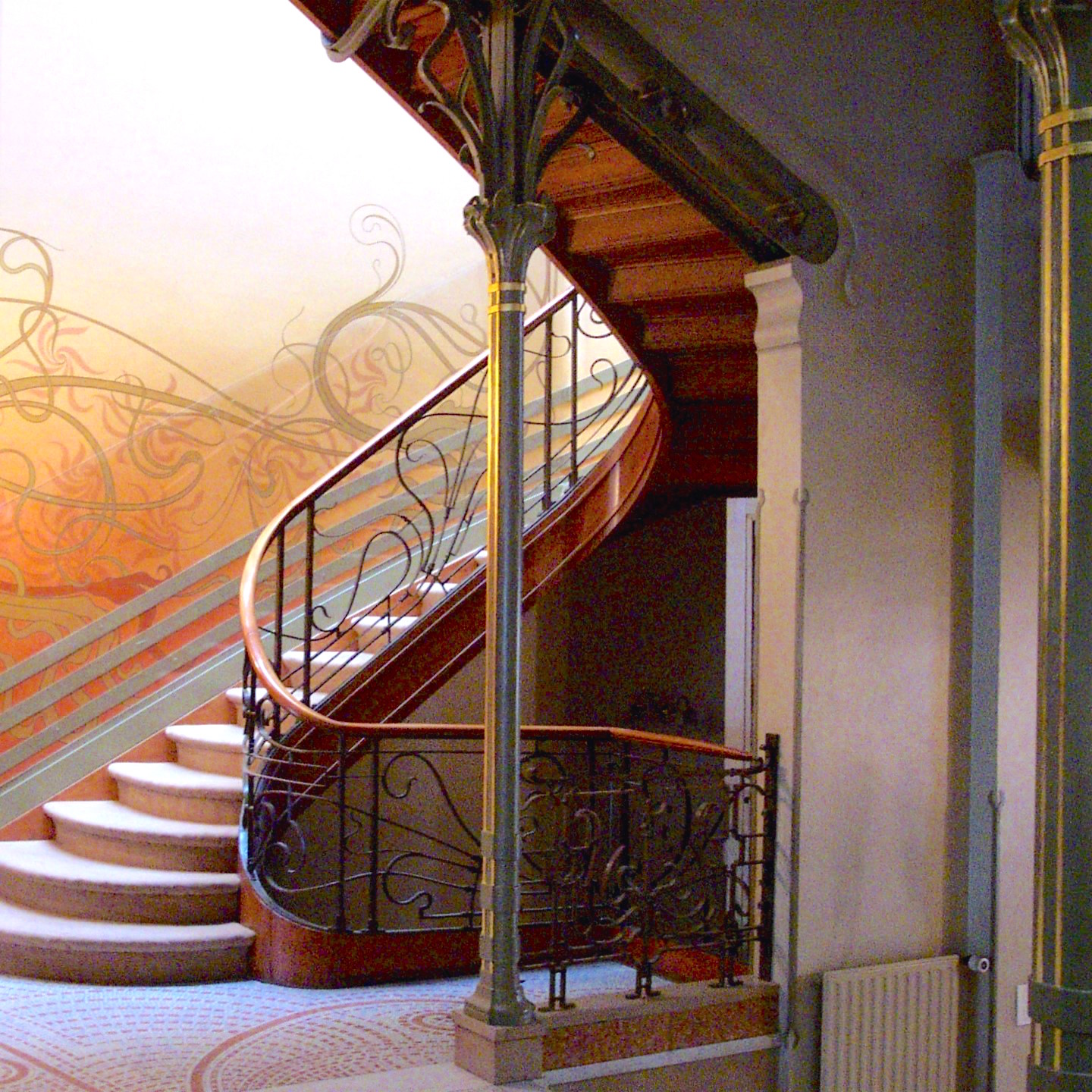
Stairway of the Hôtel Tassel by Victor Horta

Brussels is internationally recognised for its Art Nouveau architecture, particularly the works of Victor Horta, Paul Hankar and Henry Van de Velde. Some of Brussels' municipalities, such as Schaerbeek, Etterbeek, Ixelles, and Saint-Gilles, were developed during the heyday of Art Nouveau and have many buildings in that style. The Major Town Houses of the Architect Victor Horta—Hôtel Tassel, Hôtel van Eetvelde, Hôtel Solvay and the Horta Museum—are listed as a UNESCO World Heritage Site. Another example of Brussels' Art Nouveau is the Stoclet Palace by Josef Hoffmann, also designated a World Heritage Site by UNESCO.

Art Deco structures include the Résidence Palace (now part of the Europa building), the Centre for Fine Arts, the Villa Empain, the Municipal Hall of Forest, and the Flagey Building in Ixelles. Interwar religious buildings in that style are represented by the Church of St. John the Baptist in Molenbeek and the Church of St. Augustine in Forest. Combining Art Deco with neo-Byzantine elements, the Basilica of the Sacred Heart in Koekelberg is one of the world's largest churches by area. Another example is the Centenary Palace, built for the 1935 World's Fair on the Heysel/Heizel Plateau in northern Brussels, home to the Brussels Exhibition Centre (Brussels Expo). The Atomium, a symbolic 102 m-tall (335 ft) modernist structure, built for the 1958 World's Fair (Expo 58), is the plateau's main monument and a city landmark. Next to it is Mini-Europe miniature park, with 1:25 scale maquettes of famous European buildings.

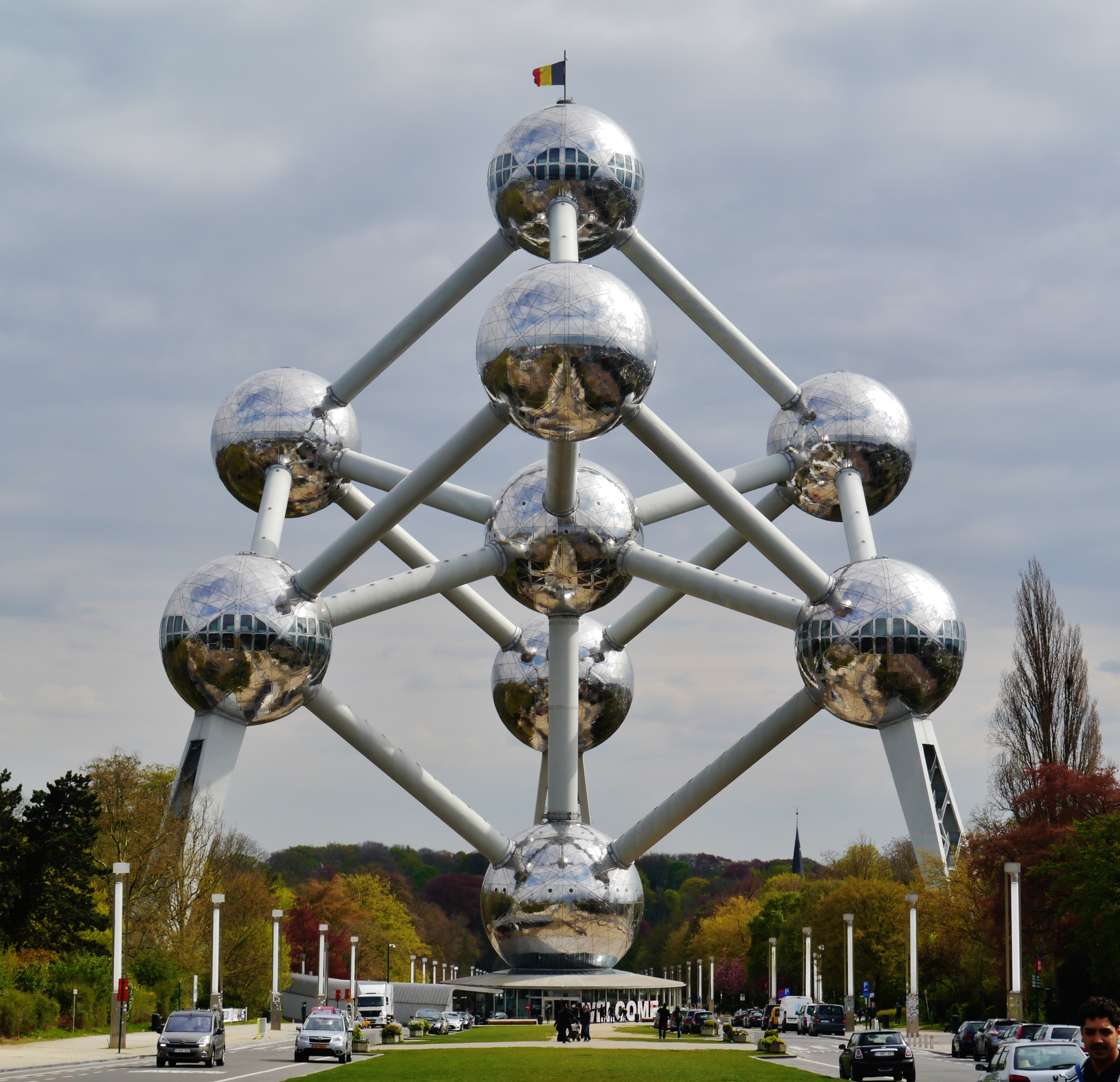
The Atomium

Since the second half of the 20th century, modern office towers have been built (Madou Tower, Rogier Tower, Proximus Towers, Finance Tower, the World Trade Center, among others). They are mostly concentrated in the city's main business district: the Northern Quarter, near Brussels-North railway station. The South Tower, standing next to Brussels-South railway station, is the tallest building in Belgium, at 148 m (486 ft). Along the North–South connection, is the State Administrative Centre, an administrative complex in the International Style. The postmodern buildings of the Espace Léopold complete the picture.

The city's embrace of modern architecture translated into an ambivalent approach towards historic preservation, leading to the destruction of notable architectural landmarks, most famously the Maison du Peuple/Volkshuis by Victor Horta, a process known as Brusselisation.

== Culture ==
=== Visual arts and museums ===
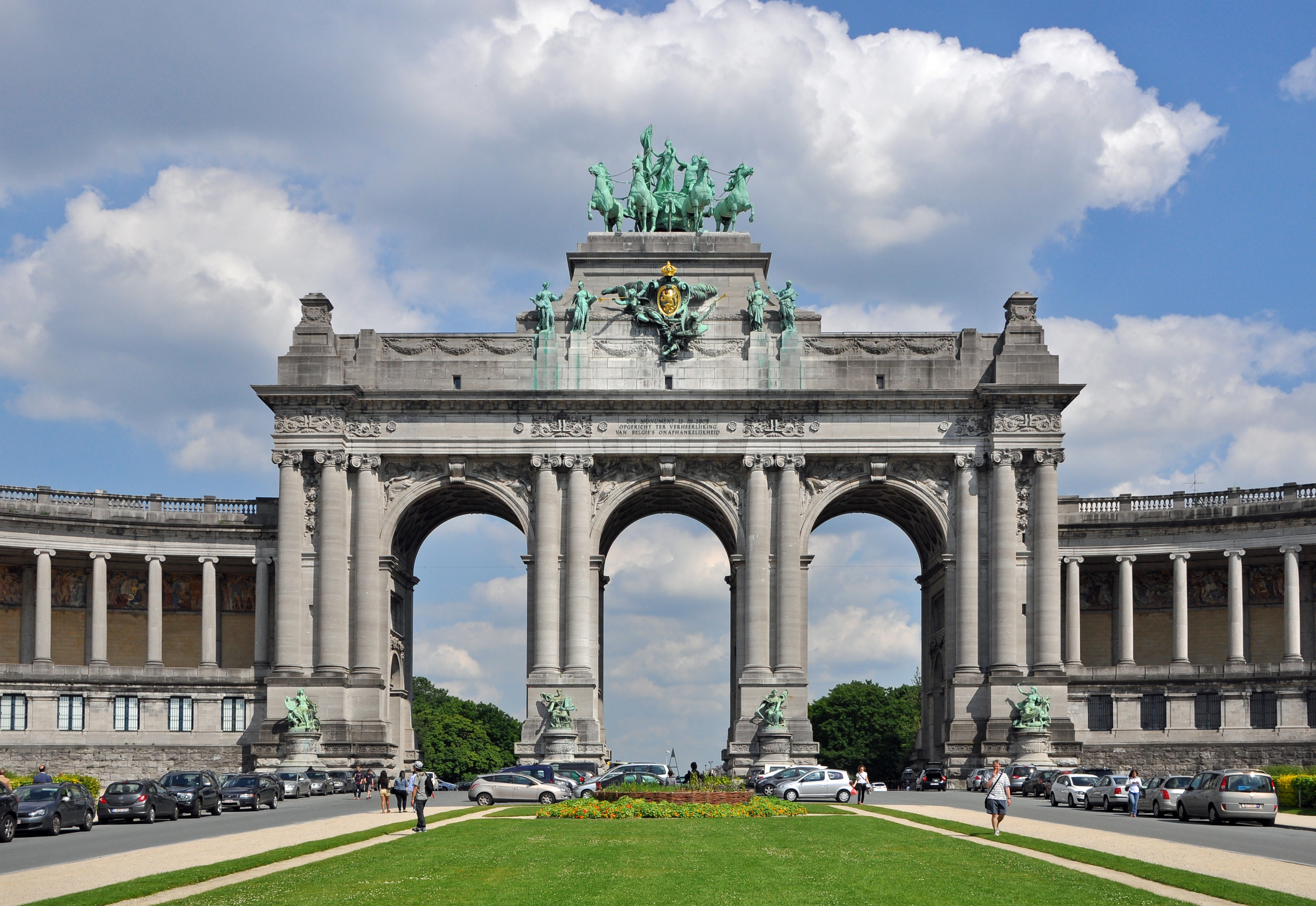
Cinquantenaire/Jubelpark memorial arcade and museums

Brussels contains over 80 museums. The Royal Museums of Fine Arts has an extensive collection of various painters, such as Flemish old masters like Bruegel, Rogier van der Weyden, Robert Campin, Anthony van Dyck, Jacob Jordaens, and Peter Paul Rubens. The Magritte Museum houses the world's largest collection of works by the surrealist artist René Magritte. Museums dedicated to the national history of Belgium include the BELvue Museum, the Royal Museums of Art and History, and the Royal Museum of the Armed Forces and Military History. The Musical Instruments Museum (MIM), housed in the Old England building, is part of the Royal Museums of Art and History, and is internationally renowned for its collection of over 8,000 instruments.

Brussels has had a distinguished art scene for many years. The Belgian surrealists René Magritte and Paul Delvaux, for instance, studied and lived there, as did the avant-garde dramatist Michel de Ghelderode. The city was also home of the impressionist painter Anna Boch from the artists' group Les XX, and includes other Belgian painters such as Léon Spilliaert. Brussels is also a capital of the comic strip; some treasured Belgian characters are Tintin, Lucky Luke, The Smurfs, Spirou, Gaston, Marsupilami, Blake and Mortimer, Boule et Bill and Cubitus (see Belgian comics). Throughout the city, walls are painted with large motifs of comic book characters; these murals taken together are known as Brussels' Comic Book Route. Also, the interiors of some Metro stations are designed by artists. The Belgian Comic Strip Center combines two artistic leitmotifs of Brussels, being a museum devoted to Belgian comic strips, housed in the former Magasins Waucquez textile department store, designed by Victor Horta in the Art Nouveau style. In addition, street art is changing the landscape of this multicultural city.

=== Performing arts venues and festivals ===
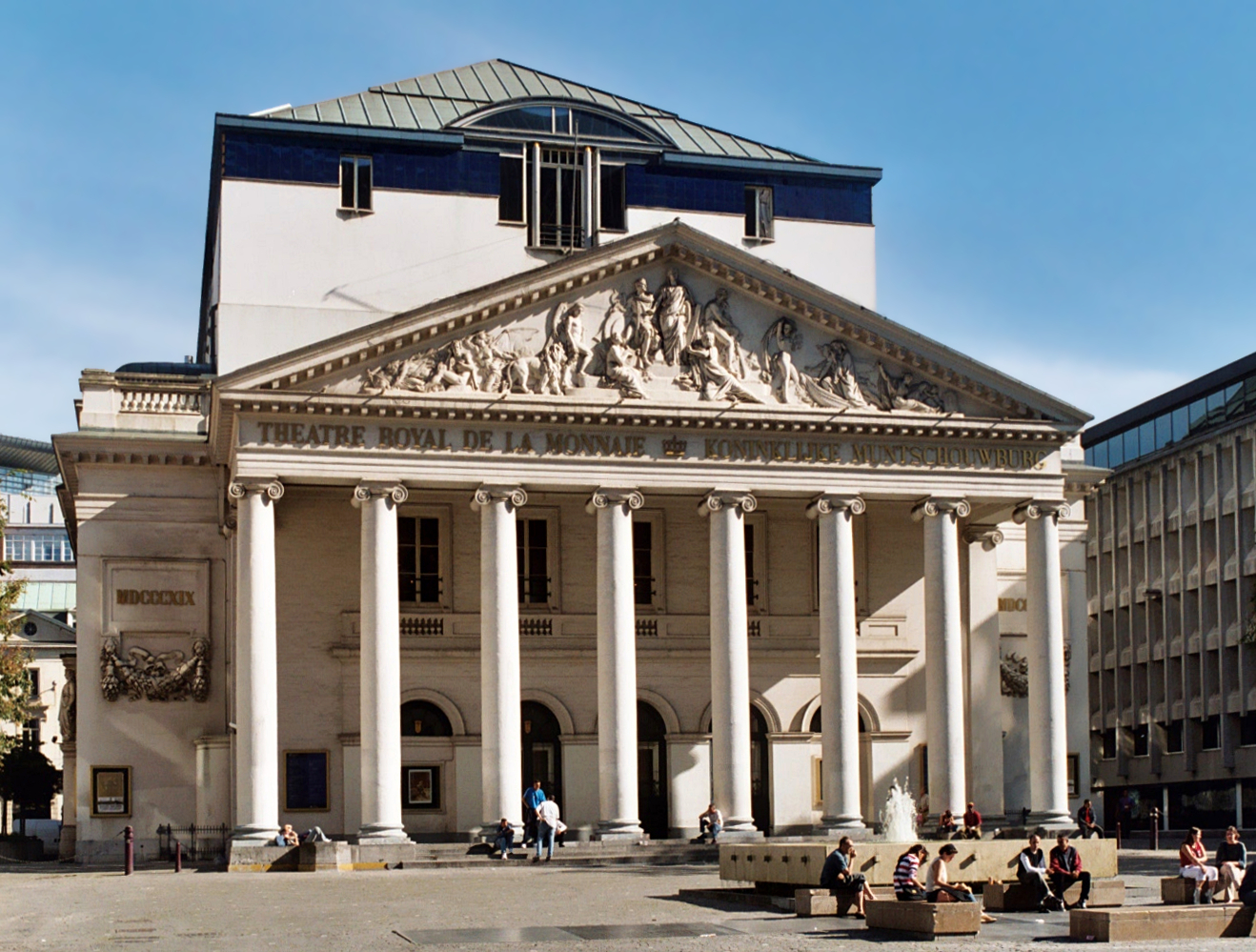
Royal Theatre of La Monnaie

Brussels is well known for its performing arts scene, with the Royal Theatre of La Monnaie, the Royal Park Theatre, the Théâtre Royal des Galeries, and the Kaaitheater among the most notable institutions.

The King Baudouin Stadium is a concert and competition facility with a 50,000 seat capacity, the largest in Belgium. The site was formerly occupied by the Heysel Stadium. The Centre for Fine Arts (often referred to as BOZAR in French or PSK in Dutch), a multi-purpose centre for theatre, cinema, music, literature, and art exhibitions, is home to the National Orchestra of Belgium and to the annual Queen Elisabeth Competition for classical singers and instrumentalists, one of the most challenging and prestigious competitions of the kind. Studio 4 in Le Flagey cultural centre hosts the Brussels Philharmonic.

Other concert venues include Forest National/Vorst Nationaal, the Ancienne Belgique, the Cirque Royal/Koninklijk Circus, the Botanique and Palais 12/Paleis 12. Furthermore, the Jazz Station in Saint-Josse-ten-Noode is a museum and archive on jazz, and a venue for jazz concerts.

The Kunstenfestivaldesarts, an international performing arts festival, is organised every year in May. Its main hub is the Kaaitheater, with performances and artworks also hosted in around 30 venues throughout the city.

=== Other cultural events and festivals ===
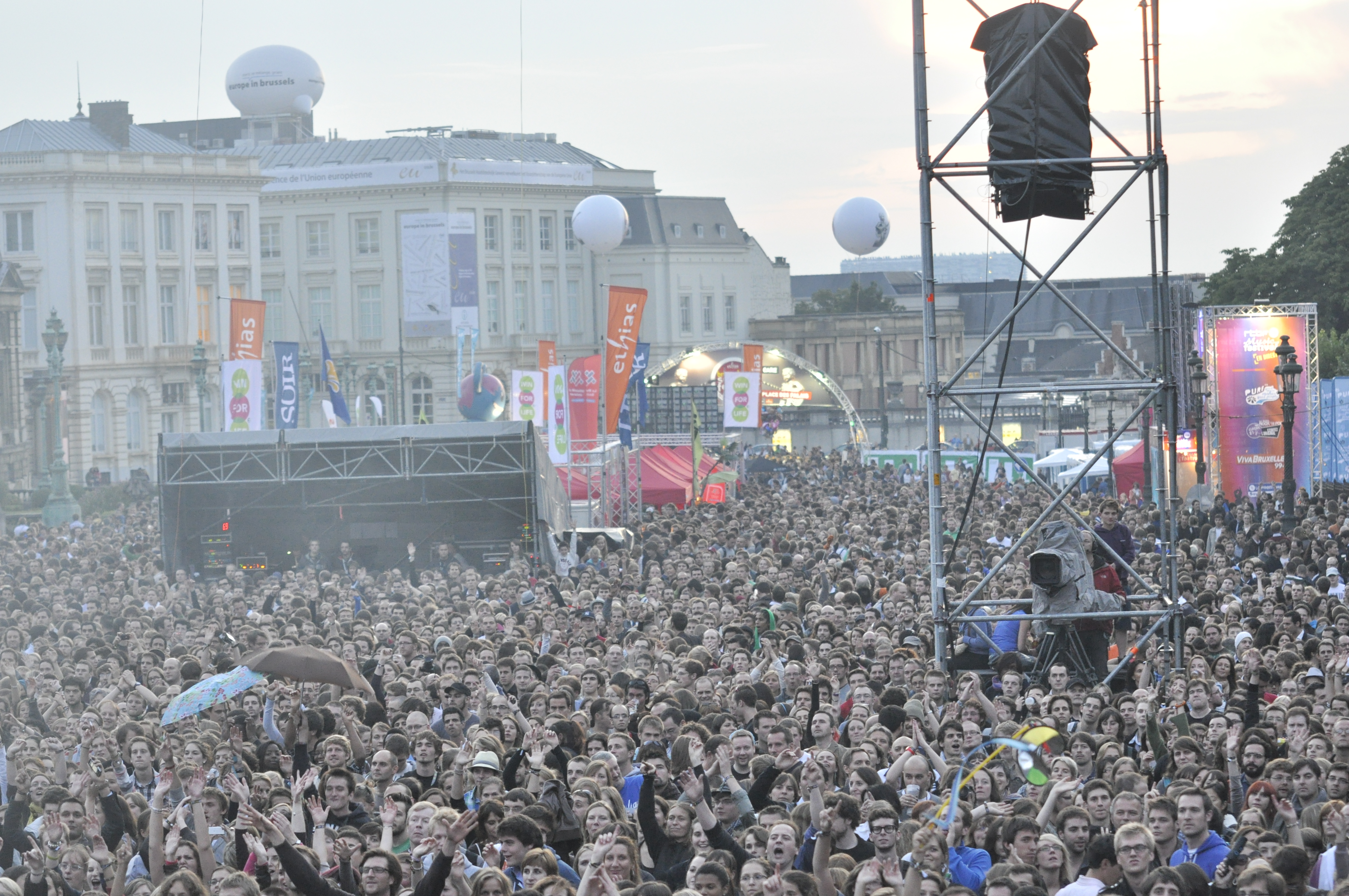
Brussels Summer Festival (BSF)

Many events are organised or hosted in Brussels throughout the year. In addition, many festivals animate the Brussels scene.

The Iris Festival is the official festival of the Brussels-Capital Region and is held annually in spring. The International Fantastic Film Festival of Brussels (BIFFF) is organised during the Easter holidays and the Magritte Awards in February. The Festival of Europe, an open day and activities in and around the European Union's institutions, is held on 9 May. On Belgian National Day, on 21 July, a military parade and celebrations take place on the Place des Palais/Paleizenplein and in Brussels Park, ending with a fireworks display in the evening.

Some summer festivities include Couleur Café Festival, a festival of world and urban music, around the end of June or early July, the Brussels Summer Festival (BSF), a music festival in August, the Midi Fair, the most important yearly fair in Brussels, lasting more than a month, in July and August, and Brussels Beach, when the banks of the canal are turned into a temporary urban beach. Other biennial events are the Zinneke Parade, a colourful, multicultural parade through the city, which has been held since 2000 in May, as well as the popular Flower Carpet at the Grand-Place in August. Heritage Days are organised on the third weekend of September (sometimes coinciding with the car-free day). The "Winter Wonders" animate the heart of Brussels in December; these winter activities were launched in 2001.

=== Folklore ===
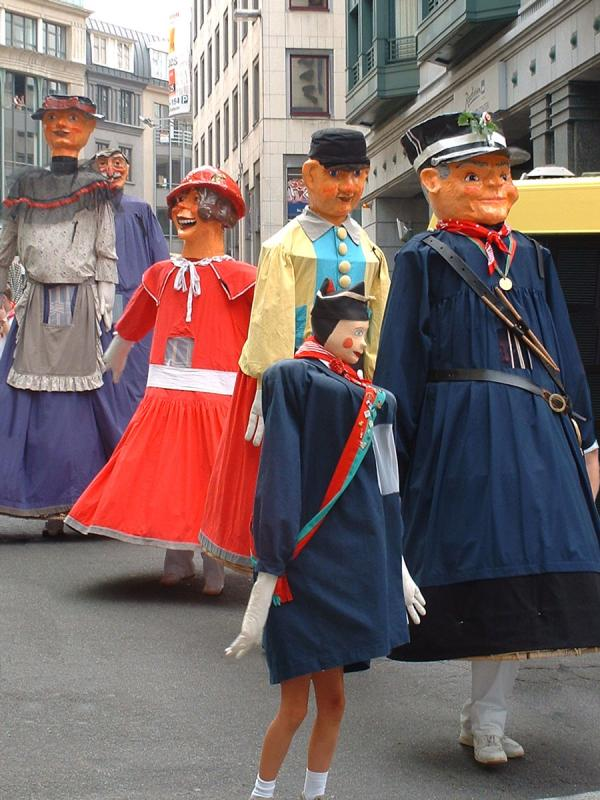
Meyboom giants in Brussels, a UNESCO Intangible Cultural Heritage

Brussels' identity owes much to its rich folklore and traditions, among the liveliest in the country.

The Ommegang, a medieval pageant and folkloric costumed procession, commemorating the Joyous Entry of Emperor Charles V and his son, Philip II, in the city in 1549, takes place every year in July. The colourful parade includes floats, traditional processional giants, such as Saint Michael and Saint Gudula, and scores of folkloric groups, either on foot or on horseback, dressed in medieval garb. The parade concludes with a large spectacle at the Grand-Place. Since 2019, it has been recognised as a Masterpiece of the Oral and Intangible Heritage of Humanity by UNESCO.

The Meyboom, an even-older folk tradition of Brussels (1308), celebrating the "May tree"—in fact, a corruption of the Dutch word, meaning tree of joy—takes place paradoxically on 9 August. After parading a young beech in the city, it is planted in a joyful spirit with lots of music, Brusseleir songs, and processional giants. It has also been recognised as an expression of intangible cultural heritage by UNESCO, as part of the bi-national inscription "Processional giants and dragons in Belgium and France". The celebration is reminiscent of the town's long-standing (folkloric) feud with Leuven, which dates back to the Middle Ages.

Saint Verhaegen (often shortened to St V), a folkloric student procession, celebrating the anniversary of the founding of the Université libre de Bruxelles (ULB) and the Vrije Universiteit Brussel (VUB), is held on 20 November. Since 2019, it has also been listed as intangible cultural heritage of the Brussels-Capital Region.

Another introduction to the Brusseleir local dialect and way of life can be obtained at the Royal Theatre Toone, a folkloric theatre of marionettes, located a stone's throw away from the Grand-Place. Finally, two folkloric plays, Le Mariage de mademoiselle Beulemans by Frantz Fonson and Fernand Wicheler, and Bossemans et Coppenolle by Joris d'Hanswyck and Paul Van Stalle, are still the subject of regular revivals.

== Cuisine ==
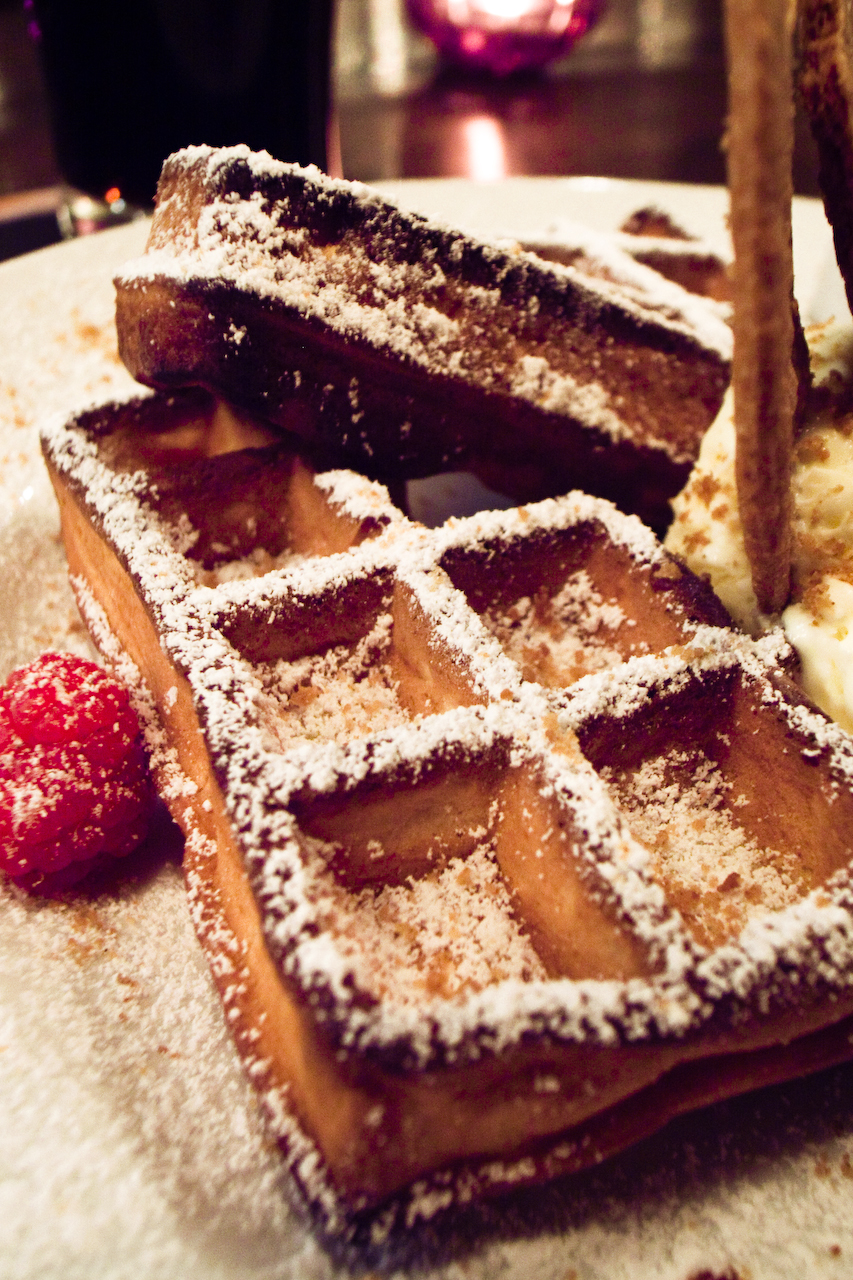
Brussels is known for its local waffles.

Brussels is well known for its local waffle, its chocolate, French fries and numerous types of beers. The Brussels sprout, which has long been popular in Brussels, and may have originated there, is also named after the city.

Owing to Brussels' cosmopolitan population, almost every national cuisine in the world can be found there. The gastronomic offer includes approximately 1,800 restaurants (including three 2-starred and ten 1-starred Michelin restaurants), and a number of bars. Alongside the traditional restaurants, there are many cafés, bistros and the usual range of international fast food chains. The cafés are similar to bars, and offer beer and light dishes; coffee houses are called salons de thé (literally "tea salons"). Also widespread are brasseries, which usually offer a variety of beers and typical national dishes.

Belgian cuisine is known among connoisseurs as one of the best in Europe. It is characterised by the combination of French cuisine with the more hearty Flemish fare. Notable specialities include Brussels waffles (gaufres) and mussels (usually as moules-frites, served with fries). The city is a stronghold of chocolate and praline manufacturers with renowned companies like Côte d'Or, Neuhaus, Leonidas and Godiva. Pralines were first introduced in 1912 by Jean Neuhaus II, a Belgian chocolatier of Swiss origin, in the Royal Saint-Hubert Galleries. Numerous friteries are spread throughout the city, and in tourist areas, fresh hot waffles are also sold on the street.

As well as other Belgian beers, the spontaneously fermented lambic style, brewed in and around Brussels, is widely available there and in the nearby Senne valley where the wild yeasts that ferment it have their origin. Kriek, a cherry lambic, is available in almost every bar or restaurant in Brussels.

Brussels is known as the birthplace of the Belgian endive. The technique for growing blanched endives was accidentally discovered in the 1850s at the Botanical Garden of Brussels in Saint-Josse-ten-Noode.

== Shopping ==
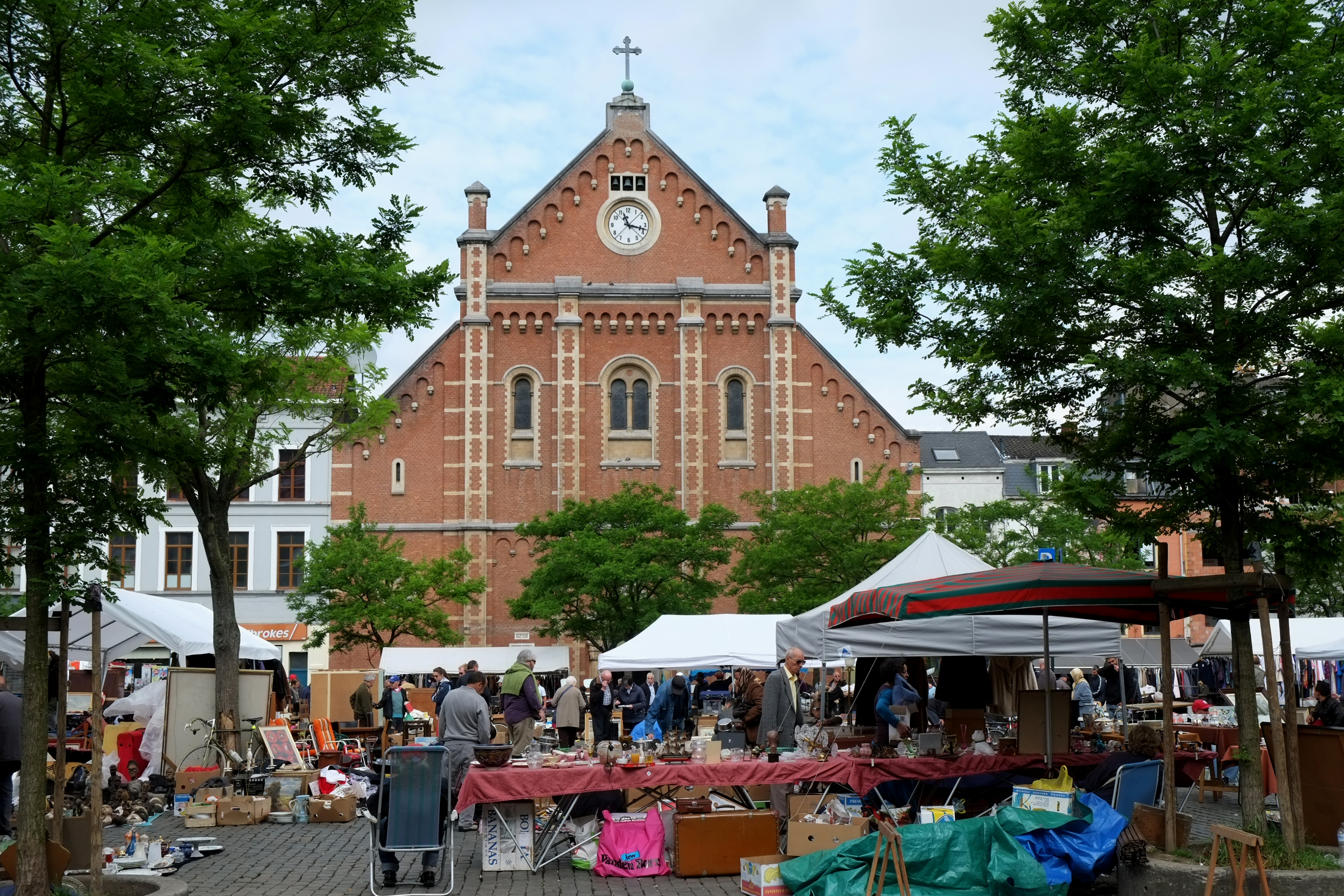
Flea market on the Place du Jeu de Balle/Vossenplein

Famous shopping areas in Brussels include the pedestrian-only Rue Neuve/Nieuwstraat, the second busiest shopping street in Belgium (after the Meir, in Antwerp) with a weekly average of 230,000 visitors, home to popular international chains (H&M, C&A, Zara, Primark), as well as the City 2 and Inno shopping galleries. The Royal Saint-Hubert Galleries, one of the oldest covered shopping arcades in Europe, hold a variety of luxury shops and some six million people stroll through them each year. The neighbourhood around the Rue Antoine Dansaert/Antoine Dansaertstraat has also become, in recent years, a focal point for fashion and design.

In Ixelles, the Avenue de la Toison d'Or/Gulden-Vlieslaan and the Namur Gate area have luxury shops, fast food restaurants and entertainment venues. Another shopping area is the Chaussée d'Ixelles/Elsenesteenweg, in the mainly-Congolese Matongé district. The nearby Avenue Louise/Louizalaan is lined with high-end fashion stores and boutiques, making it one of the most expensive streets in Belgium.

There are shopping centres outside the inner ring: Basilix, Woluwe Shopping Center, Westland Shopping Center, and Docks Bruxsel, which opened in October 2017. In addition, Brussels ranks as one of Europe's best capital cities for flea market shopping. The Old Market, on the Place du Jeu de Balle/Vossenplein, in the Marolles/Marollen neighbourhood, is particularly renowned. The nearby Sablon/Zavel area is home to many of Brussels' antique dealers. The Midi Market around Brussels-South station and the Boulevard du Midi/Zuidlaan is reputed to be one of the largest markets in Europe.

== Sports ==
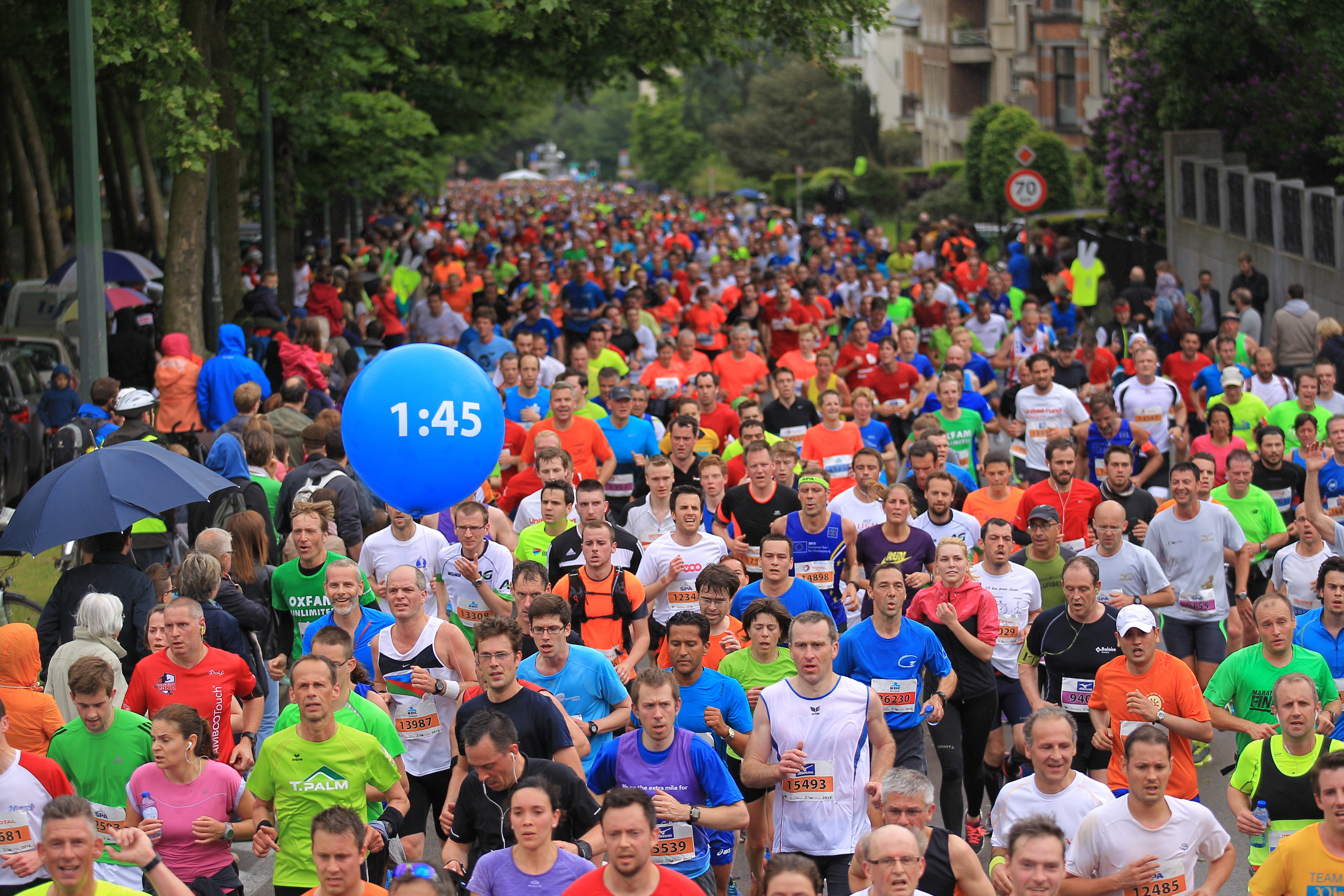
20 km of Brussels

Sport in Brussels is under the responsibility of the Communities. The Administration de l'Éducation Physique et du Sport (ADEPS) is responsible for recognising the various French-speaking sports federations and also runs three sports centres in the Brussels-Capital Region. Its Dutch-speaking counterpart is Sport Vlaanderen (formerly called BLOSO).

The King Baudouin Stadium (formerly the Heysel Stadium) is the largest in the country and home to the national teams in football and rugby union. It hosted the final of the 1972 UEFA European Football Championship, and the opening game of the 2000 edition. Several European club finals have been held at the ground, including the 1985 European Cup Final, which saw 39 deaths due to hooliganism and structural collapse. The King Baudouin Stadium is also home of the annual Memorial Van Damme athletics event, Belgium's foremost track and field competition, which is part of the Diamond League. Other important athletics events are the Brussels Marathon and the 20 km of Brussels, an annual run with 30,000 participants.

=== Football ===
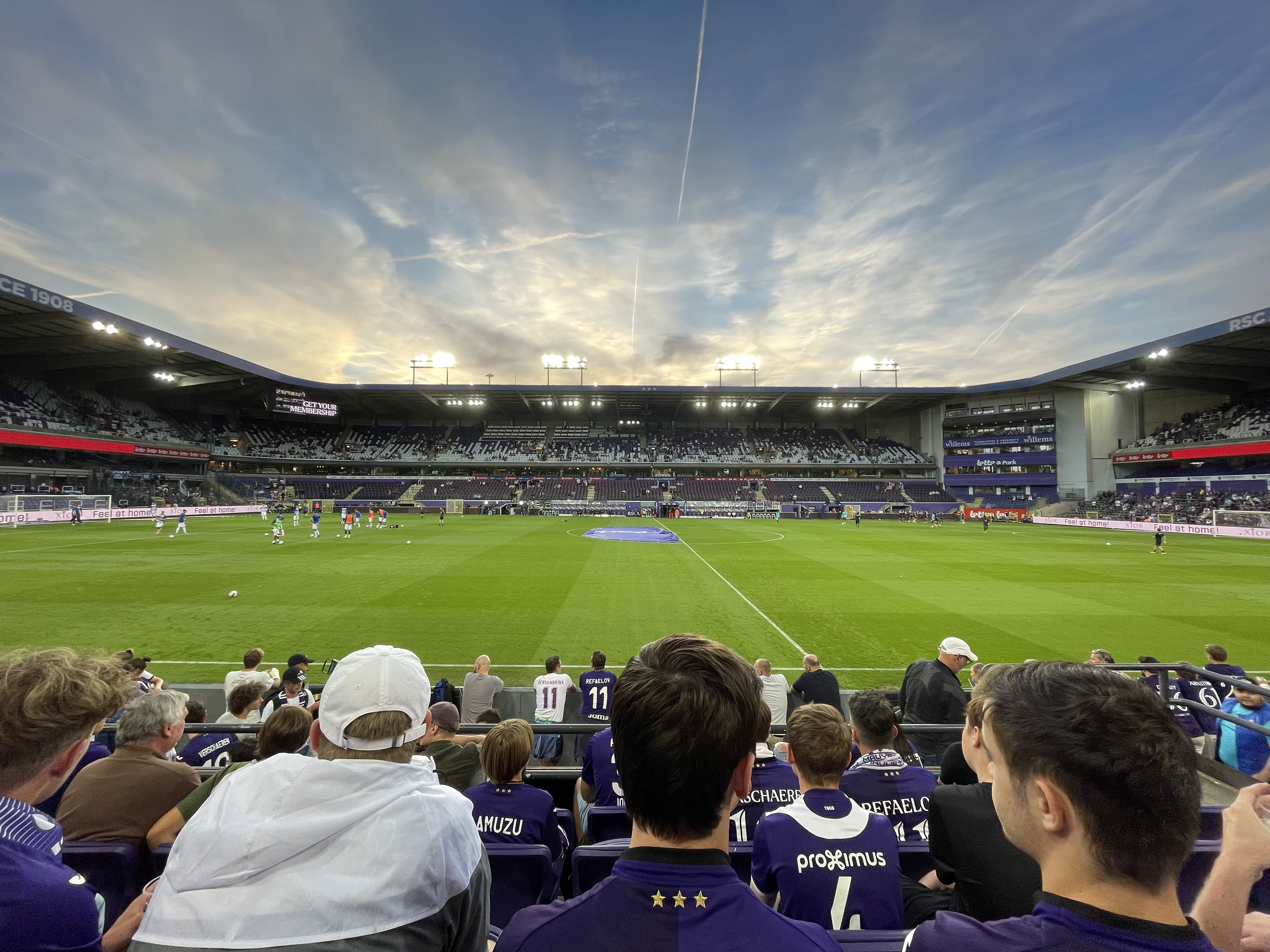
RSC Anderlecht fans at the Constant Vanden Stock Stadium

RSC Anderlecht, based in the Constant Vanden Stock Stadium in Anderlecht, is the most successful Belgian football club in the Belgian Pro League, with 34 titles. It has also won the most major European tournaments for a Belgian side, with 6 European titles. Brussels is also home to Union Saint-Gilloise, the most successful Belgian club before World War II, with 12 titles. The club was founded in Saint-Gilles but is based in nearby Forest, and plays in the Belgian Pro League. Racing White Daring Molenbeek, based in Molenbeek-Saint-Jean, and often referred to as RWDM, is a popular football club that, since 2023, is back playing in the Belgian Pro League.

Other Brussels clubs that played in the national series over the years were Royal White Star Bruxelles, Ixelles SC, Crossing Club de Schaerbeek (born from a merger between RCS de Schaerbeek and Crossing Club Molenbeek), Scup Jette, RUS de Laeken, Racing Jet de Bruxelles, AS Auderghem, KV Wosjot Woluwe and FC Ganshoren.

=== Cycling ===
Brussels is home to notable cycling races. The city is the arrival location of the Brussels Cycling Classic, formerly known as Paris–Brussels, which is one of the oldest semi classic bicycle races on the international calendar. From World War I until the early 1970s, the Six Days of Brussels was organised regularly. In the last decades of the 20th century, the Grand Prix Eddy Merckx was also held in Brussels.

== Economy ==
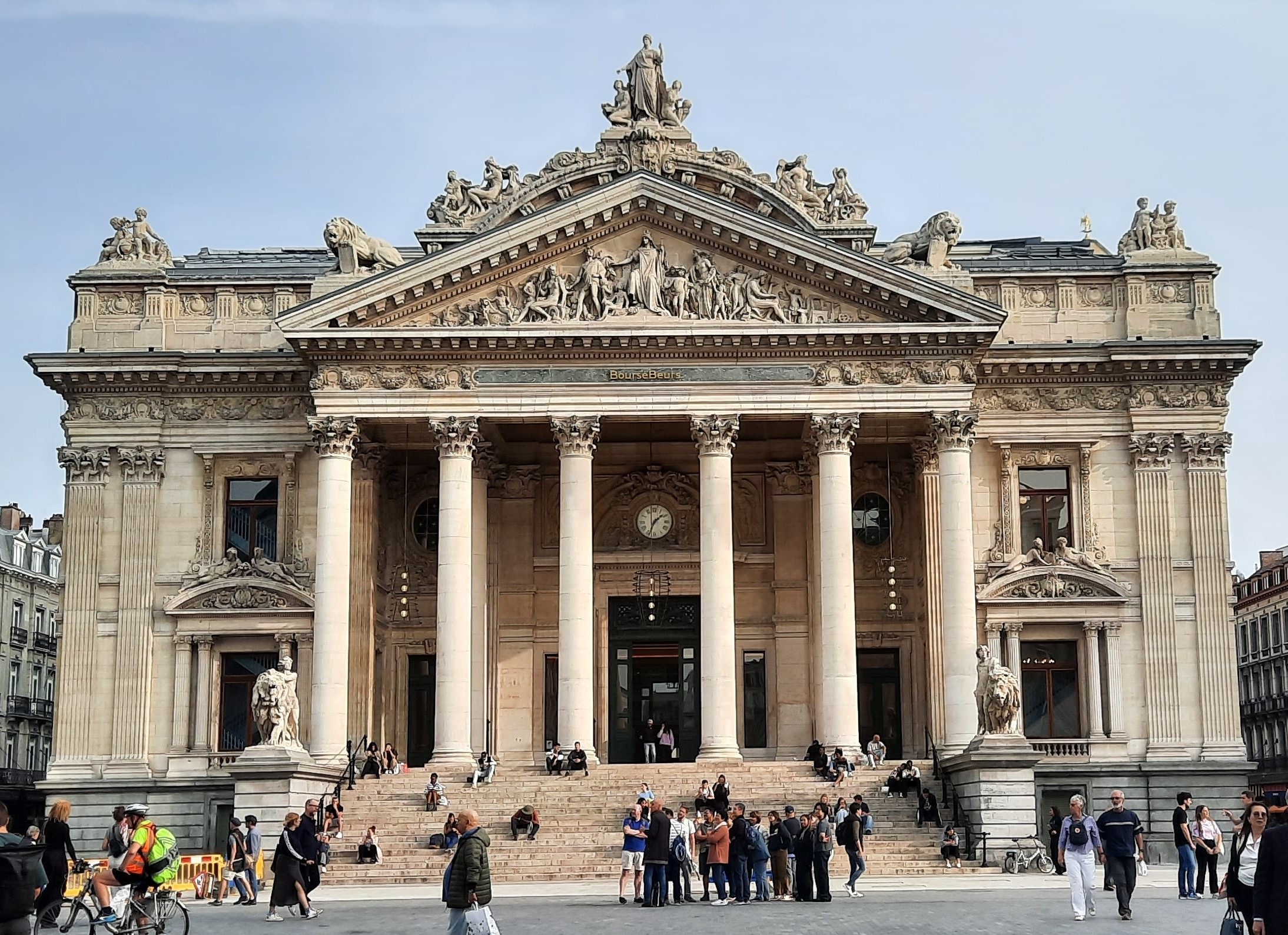
The Bourse Palace, the former Brussels Stock Exchange (BSE) building

Serving as the centre of administration for Belgium and Europe, Brussels' economy is largely service-oriented. It is dominated by regional and world headquarters of multinationals, by European institutions, by various local and federal administrations, and by related services companies, though it does have a number of notable craft industries, such as the Cantillon Brewery, a lambic brewery founded in 1900.

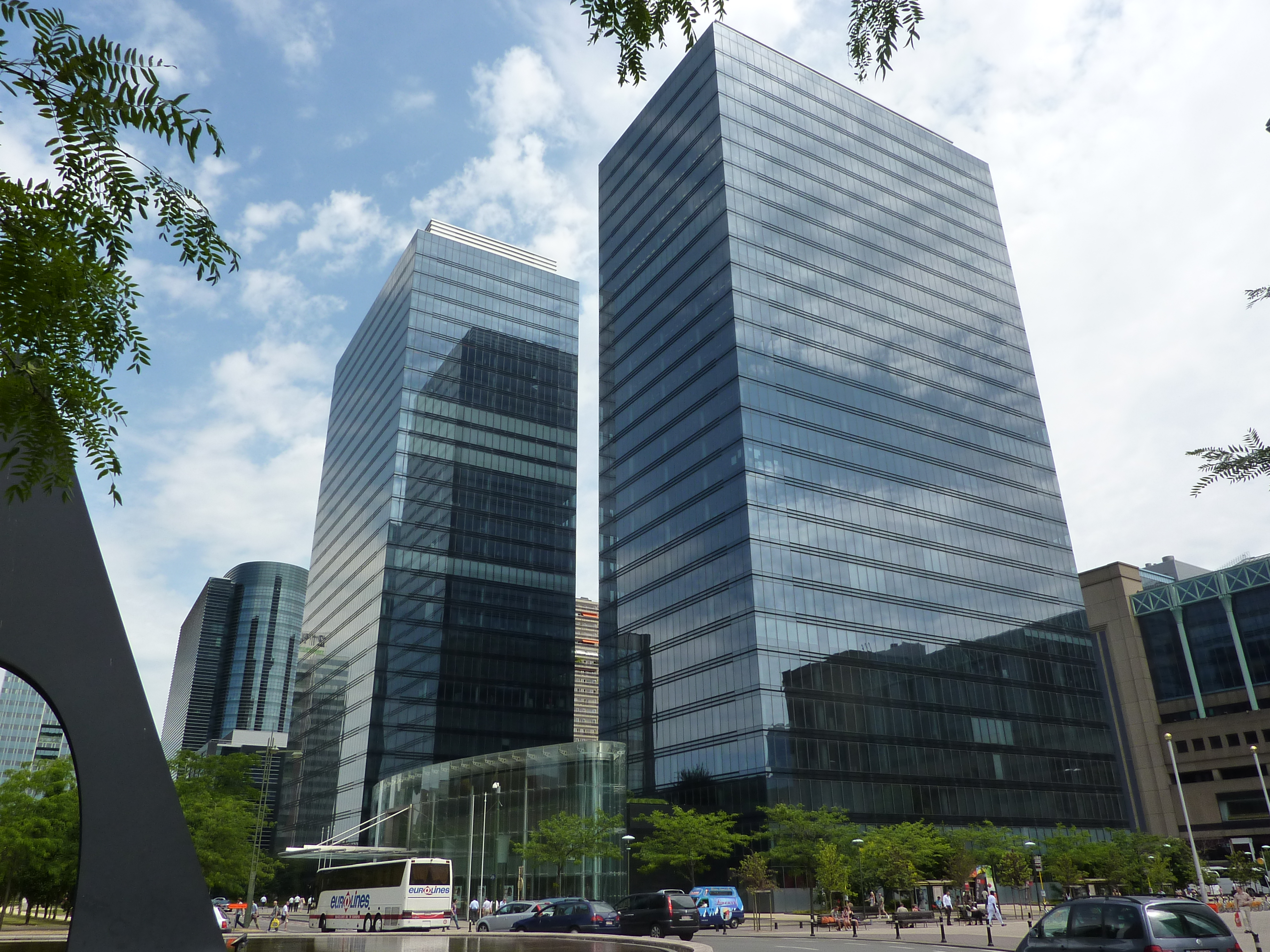
Brussels' Northern Quarter business district

Brussels has a robust economy. The region contributes to one fifth of Belgium's GDP, and its 550,000 jobs account for 17.7% of Belgium's employment. Its GDP per capita is nearly double that of Belgium as a whole, and it has the highest GDP per capita of any NUTS 1 region in the EU, at ~$80,000 in 2016. However, the GDP is boosted by a massive inflow of commuters from neighbouring regions; over half of those who work in Brussels live in Flanders or Wallonia, with 230,000 and 130,000 commuters per day respectively. Conversely, only 16.0% of Brussels residents work outside the region (68,827 (68.5%) of them in Flanders and 21,035 (31.5%) in Wallonia). Not all of the wealth generated in Brussels remains in the region, and as of December 2013, the unemployment among its residents is 20.4%.

There are approximately 50,000 businesses in Brussels, of which around 2,200 are foreign. This number is constantly increasing and can well explain the role of Brussels in Europe. The city's infrastructure is favourable in terms of starting up a new business. House prices have also increased in recent years, especially with the increase of young professionals settling down in Brussels, making it the most expensive city to live in Belgium. In addition, Brussels holds more than 1,000 business conferences annually, making it the ninth most popular conference city in Europe.

Brussels is rated as the 34th most important financial centre in the world as of 2020, according to the Global Financial Centres Index. The Brussels Stock Exchange, abbreviated to BSE and now called Euronext Brussels, is part of the European stock exchange Euronext, along with Paris Bourse, Lisbon Stock Exchange and Amsterdam Stock Exchange. Its benchmark stock market index is the BEL20.

== Media ==
Brussels is a centre of both media and communications in Belgium, with many Belgian television stations, radio stations, newspapers and telephone companies having their headquarters in the region. The French-language public broadcaster RTBF, the Dutch-language public broadcaster VRT, the two regional channels BX1 (formerly Télé Bruxelles) and Bruzz (formerly TV Brussel), the encrypted BeTV channel and private channels RTL-TVI and VTM are headquartered in Brussels. Some national newspapers such as Le Soir, La Libre, De Morgen and the news agency Belga are based in or around Brussels. The Belgian postal company bpost, as well as the telecommunication companies and mobile operators Proximus, Orange Belgium and Telenet are all located there.

As English is spoken widely, several English media organisations operate in Brussels. The most popular of these are the English-language daily news media platform and bi-monthly magazine The Brussels Times and the website The Bulletin. The multilingual pan-European news channel Euronews also maintains an office in Brussels.

== Education ==
=== Tertiary education ===
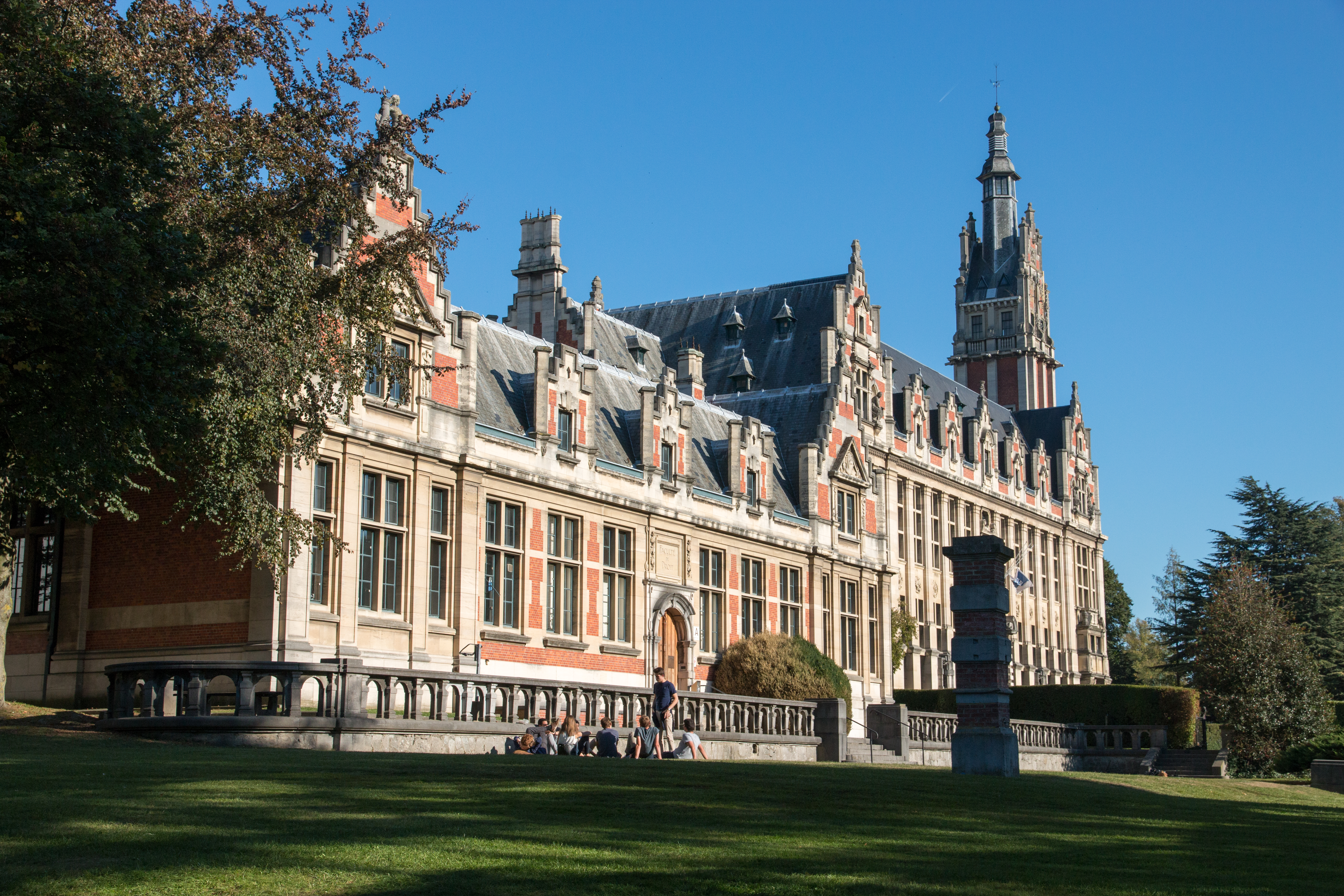
Solbosch/Solbos campus of the Université libre de Bruxelles (ULB)

There are several universities in Brussels. Except for the Royal Military Academy, a federal military college established in 1834, all universities in Brussels are private and autonomous. The Royal Military Academy is also the only Belgian university organised on the boarding school model.

The Université libre de Bruxelles (ULB), a French-speaking university, with about 20,000 students, has three campuses in the city, and the Vrije Universiteit Brussel (VUB), its Dutch-speaking sister university, has about 10,000 students. Both universities originate from a single ancestor university, founded in 1834, namely the Free University of Brussels, which was split in 1970, at about the same time the Flemish and French Communities gained legislative power over the organisation of higher education.

Saint-Louis University, Brussels (also known as UCLouvain Saint-Louis – Bruxelles) was founded in 1858 and is specialised in social and human sciences, with 4,000 students, and located on two campuses in the City of Brussels and Ixelles. From September 2018 on, the university uses the name UCLouvain, together with the Catholic University of Louvain, in the context of a merger between both universities.

Still other universities have campuses in Brussels, such as the French-speaking Catholic University of Louvain (UCLouvain), which has 10,000 students in the city with its medical faculties at UCLouvain Bruxelles Woluwe since 1973, in addition to its Faculty of Architecture, Architectural Engineering and Urban Planning and UCLouvain's Dutch-speaking sister Katholieke Universiteit Leuven (KU Leuven) (4,400 students). In addition, the University of Kent's Brussels School of International Studies is a specialised postgraduate school offering advanced international studies.

A dozen of university colleges are also located in Brussels, including two drama schools, founded in 1832: the French-speaking Conservatoire Royal and its Dutch-speaking counterpart, the Koninklijk Conservatorium.

=== Primary and secondary education ===
Most of Brussels pupils between the ages of 3 and 18 go to schools organised by the French-speaking Community or the Flemish Community, with close to 80% going to French-speaking schools, and roughly 20% to Dutch-speaking schools. Due to the post-war international presence in the city, there are also a number of international schools, including the International School of Brussels, with 1,450 pupils, between the ages of 2 1/2 and 18, the British School of Brussels, and the four European Schools, which provide free education for the children of those working in the EU institutions. The combined student population of the four European Schools in Brussels is around 10,000.

=== Libraries ===
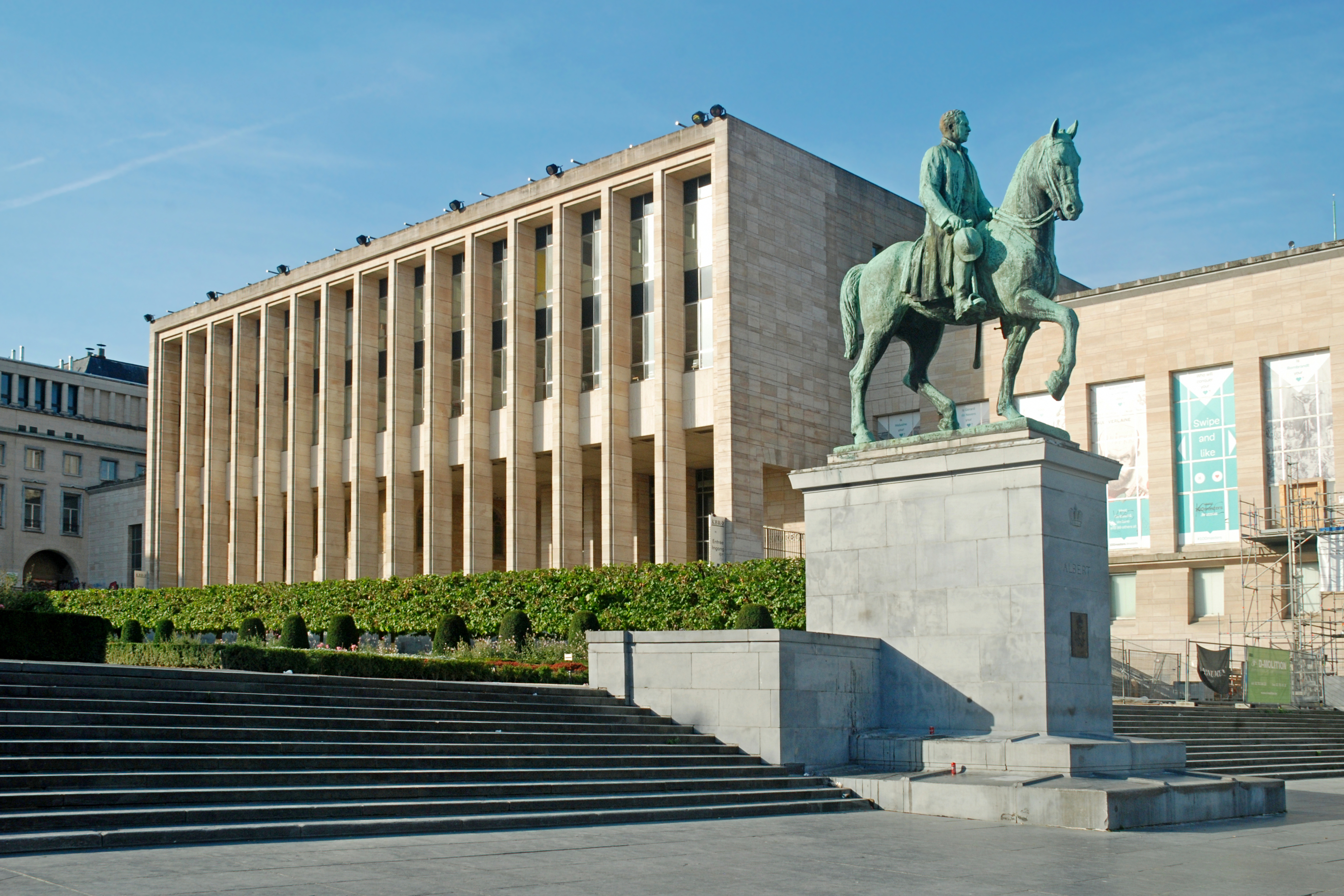
Royal Library of Belgium (KBR)

Brussels has a number of public or private-owned libraries on its territory. Most public libraries in Brussels fall under the competence of the Communities and are usually separated between French-speaking and Dutch-speaking institutions, although some are mixed.

The Royal Library of Belgium (KBR) is the national library of Belgium and one of the most prestigious libraries in the world. It owns several collections of historical importance, like the Fétis archives, and is the depository for all books ever published in Belgium or abroad by Belgian authors. It is located on the Mont des Arts/Kunstberg in central Brussels, near the Central Station.

There are several academic libraries and archives in Brussels. The libraries of the Université libre de Bruxelles (ULB) and the Vrije Universiteit Brussel (VUB) constitute the largest ensemble of university libraries in the city. In addition to the Solbosch location, there are branches in La Plaine/Het Plein and Erasme/Erasmus. Other academic libraries include those of Saint-Louis University, Brussels and the Catholic University of Louvain (UCLouvain).

=== Science and technology ===
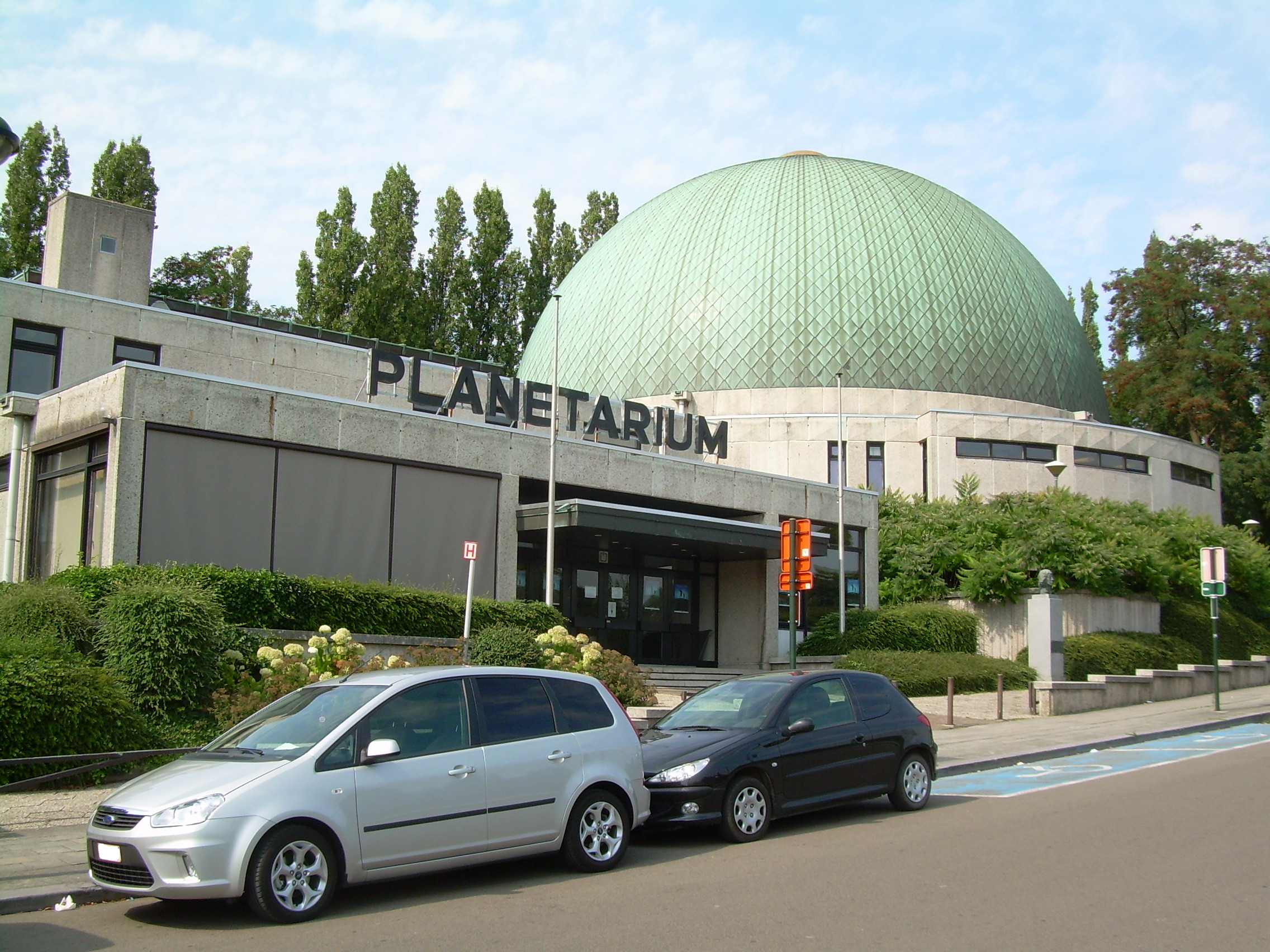
Planetarium of the Royal Observatory of Belgium

Science and technology in Brussels is well-developed with the presence of several universities and research institutes. The Brussels-Capital Region is home to several national science and technology institutes including the National Fund for Scientific Research (NFSR), the Institute for the Encouragement of Scientific Research and Innovation of Brussels (ISRIB), the Royal Academies for Science and the Arts of Belgium (RASAB) and the Belgian Academy Council of Applied Sciences (BACAS). Several science parks associated with the universities are also spread over the region.

The Royal Belgian Institute of Natural Sciences, located in Leopold Park, houses the world's largest hall completely dedicated to dinosaurs, with its collection of 30 fossilised Iguanodon skeletons. In addition, the Planetarium of the Royal Observatory of Belgium (part of the institutions of the Belgian Federal Science Policy Office), on the Heysel Plateau in Laeken, is one of the largest in Europe.

=== Healthcare ===
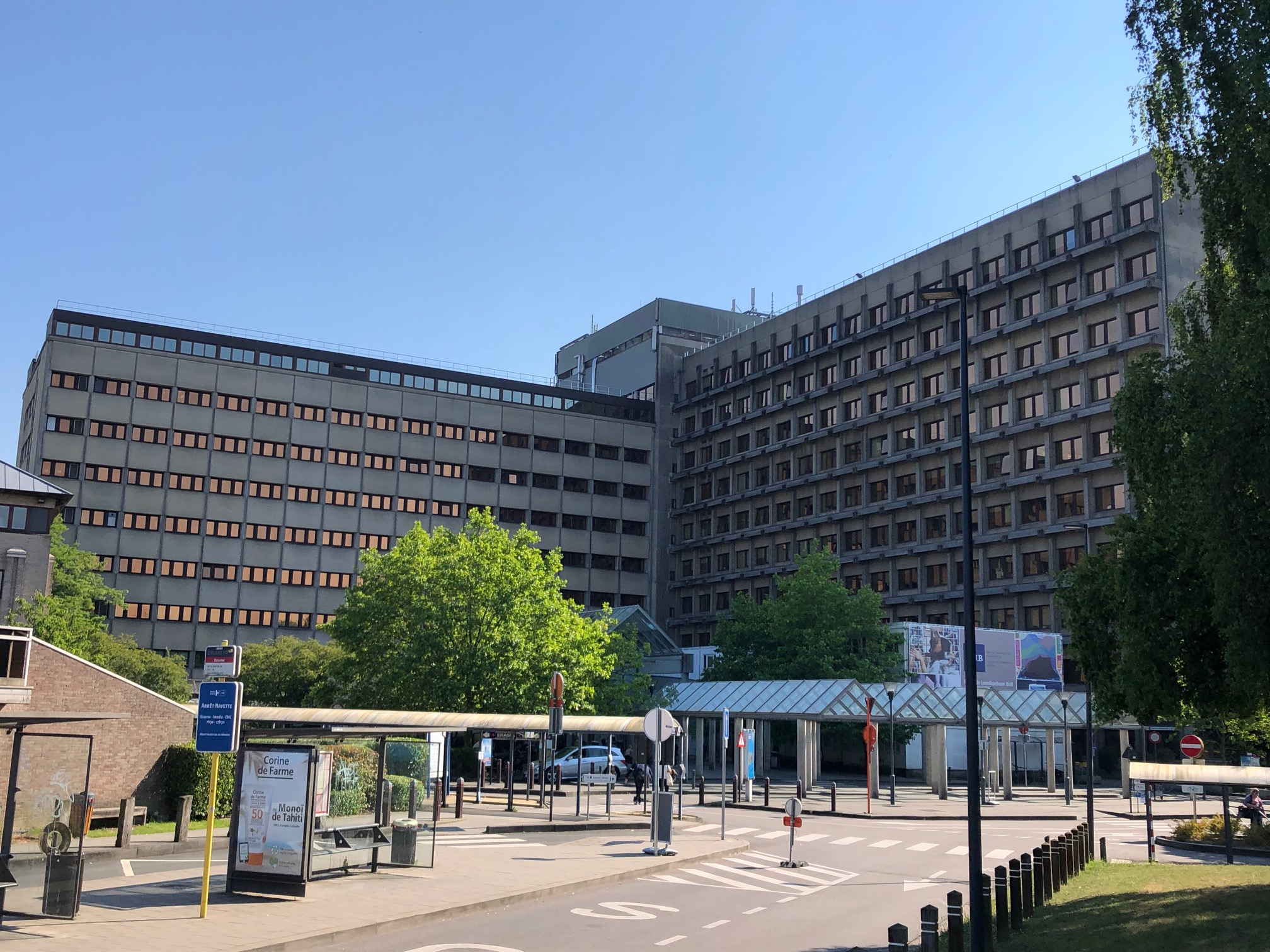
Erasmus Hospital in Anderlecht

Brussels is home to a thriving pharmaceutical and health care industry, which includes pioneering biotechnology research. The health sector employs 70,000 employees in 30,000 companies. There are 3,000 life sciences researchers in the city and two large science parks: Da Vinci Research Park and Erasmus Research Park. There are five university hospitals, a military hospital and more than 40 general hospitals and specialist clinics.

Due to its bilingual nature, hospitals in the Brussels-Capital Region can be either monolingual French, monolingual Dutch, or bilingual. University hospitals belong to one of the two linguistic communities and are thus monolingual French or Dutch by law. Other hospitals managed by a public authority must be legally bilingual. Private hospitals are legally not bound to either language, but most cater to both. However, all hospital emergency services in the Capital Region (whether part of a public or private hospital) are required to be bilingual, since patients transported by emergency ambulance cannot choose which hospital they will be taken to.

== Transport ==
Brussels has an extensive network of both private or public transportation means. Public transportation includes Brussels buses, trams, and metro (all three operated by the Brussels Intercommunal Transport Company (STIB/MIVB)), as well as a set of railway lines (operated by Infrabel) and railway stations served by public trains (operated by the National Railway Company of Belgium (SNCB/NMBS)). Air transport is available via one of the city's two airports (Brussels Airport and Brussels South Charleroi Airport), and boat transport is available via the Port of Brussels. Bicycle-sharing and car-sharing public systems are also available.

The complexity of the Belgian political landscape makes some transportation issues difficult to solve. The Brussels-Capital Region is surrounded by the Flemish and Walloon regions, which means that the airports, as well as many roads serving Brussels (most notably the Brussels Ring), are located in the other two Belgian regions.

=== Air ===
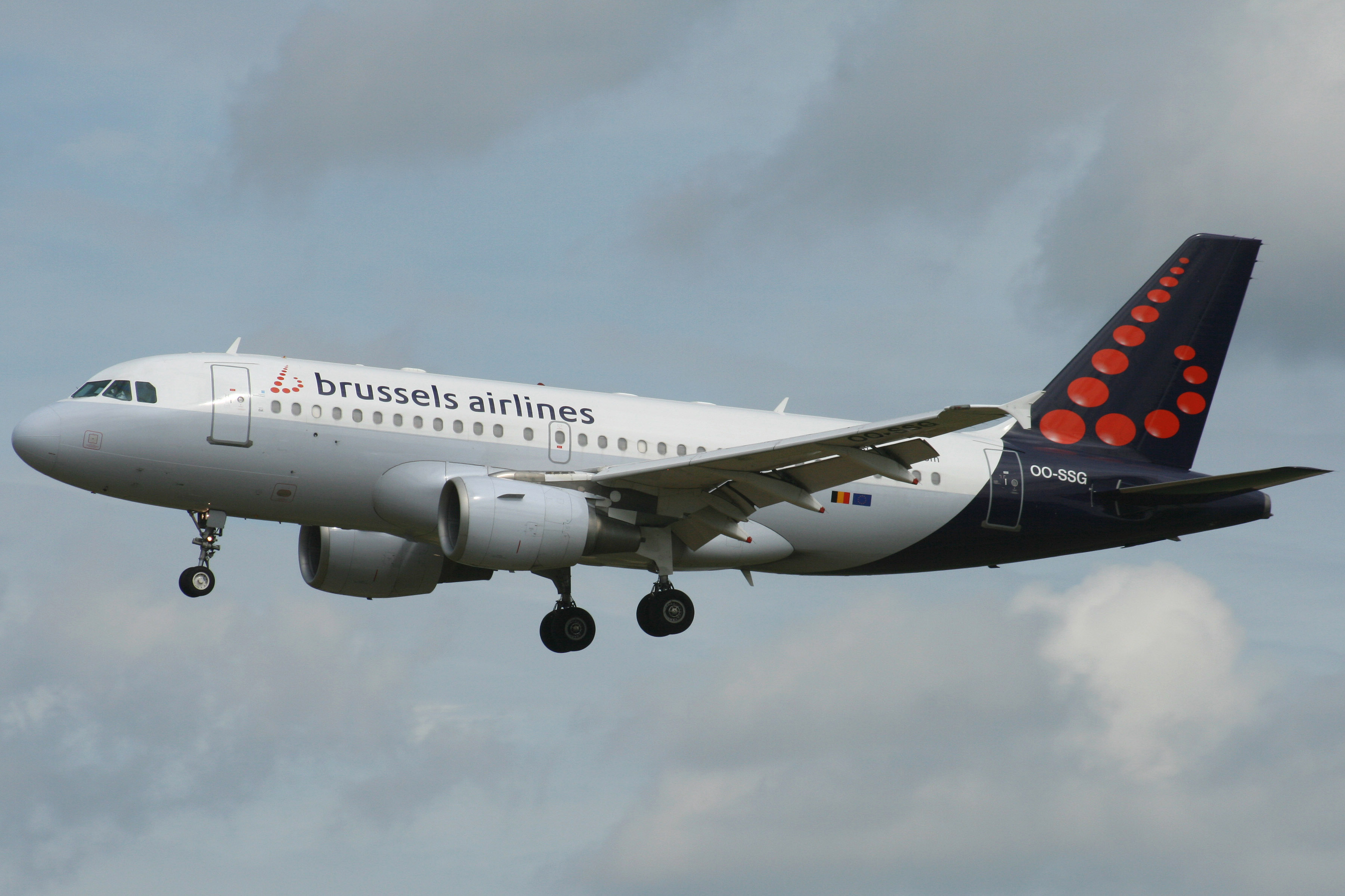
Brussels Airlines Airbus A319 landing at Brussels Airport in Zaventem

The Brussels-Capital Region is served by two airports, both located outside of the region's administrative territory. The most notable is Brussels Airport, located in the nearby Flemish municipality of Zaventem, 12 km (10 mi) east of the capital, which can be accessed by motorway (A201), train, taxi and bus. Brussels National Airport has its own railway station, located in the underground (level -1) of the airport terminal building. The secondary airport is Brussels South Charleroi Airport, located in Gosselies, a part of the city of Charleroi (Wallonia), some 50 km (30 mi) south-west of Brussels, which can be accessed by motorway (E19 then E420) or a private bus. There is also Melsbroek Air Base, located in Steenokkerzeel, a military airport that shares its infrastructure with Brussels Airport. The aforementioned airports are also the main airports of Belgium.

=== Water ===
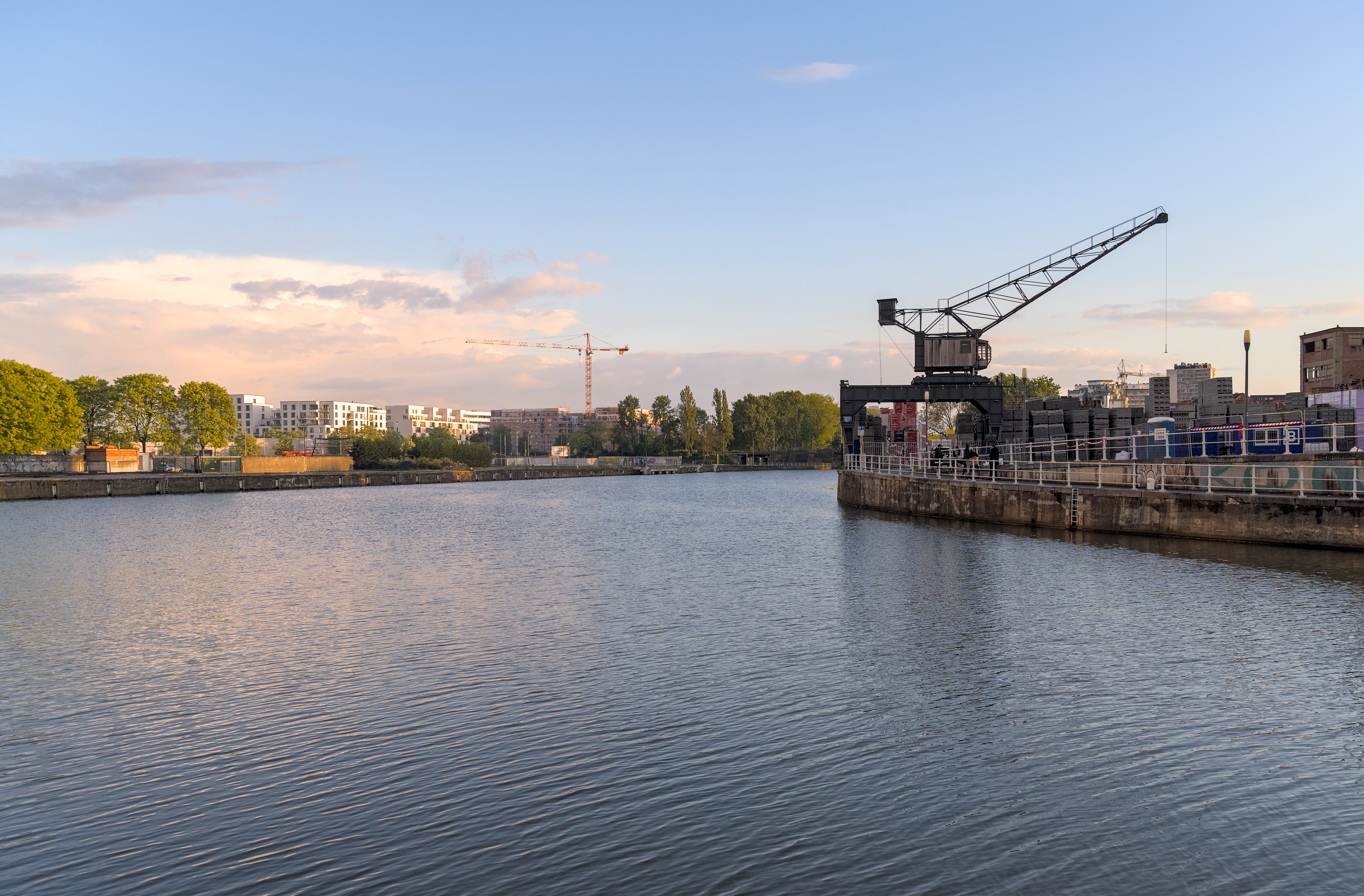
View along the Brussels–Charleroi Canal in Anderlecht

Since the 16th century, Brussels has had its own harbour, the Port of Brussels. It has been enlarged throughout the centuries to become the second Belgian inland port. Historically situated near the Place Sainte-Catherine/Sint-Katelijneplein, it lies today to the north-west of the region, on the Brussels–Scheldt Maritime Canal (commonly called Willebroek Canal), which connects Brussels to Antwerp via the Scheldt. Ships and large barges up to 4,500 t (9,900,000 lb) can penetrate deep into the country, avoiding break-ups and load transfers between Antwerp and central Brussels. This reduces the cost for companies using the canal, thereby offering a competitive advantage.

Moreover, the connection of the Willebroek Canal with the Brussels–Charleroi Canal, in the heart of the capital, creates a north–south link, by means of waterways, between the Netherlands, Flanders and the industrial zone of Hainaut (Wallonia). There, navigation can access the network of French canals, thanks to the important inclined plane of Ronquières and the lifts of Strépy-Bracquegnies.

The importance of river traffic in Brussels makes it possible to avoid the road equivalent of 740,000 trucks per year—almost 2,000 per day—which, in addition to easing traffic problems, represents an estimated carbon dioxide saving of 51,545 tonnes (113,637,000 lb) per year.

=== Train ===
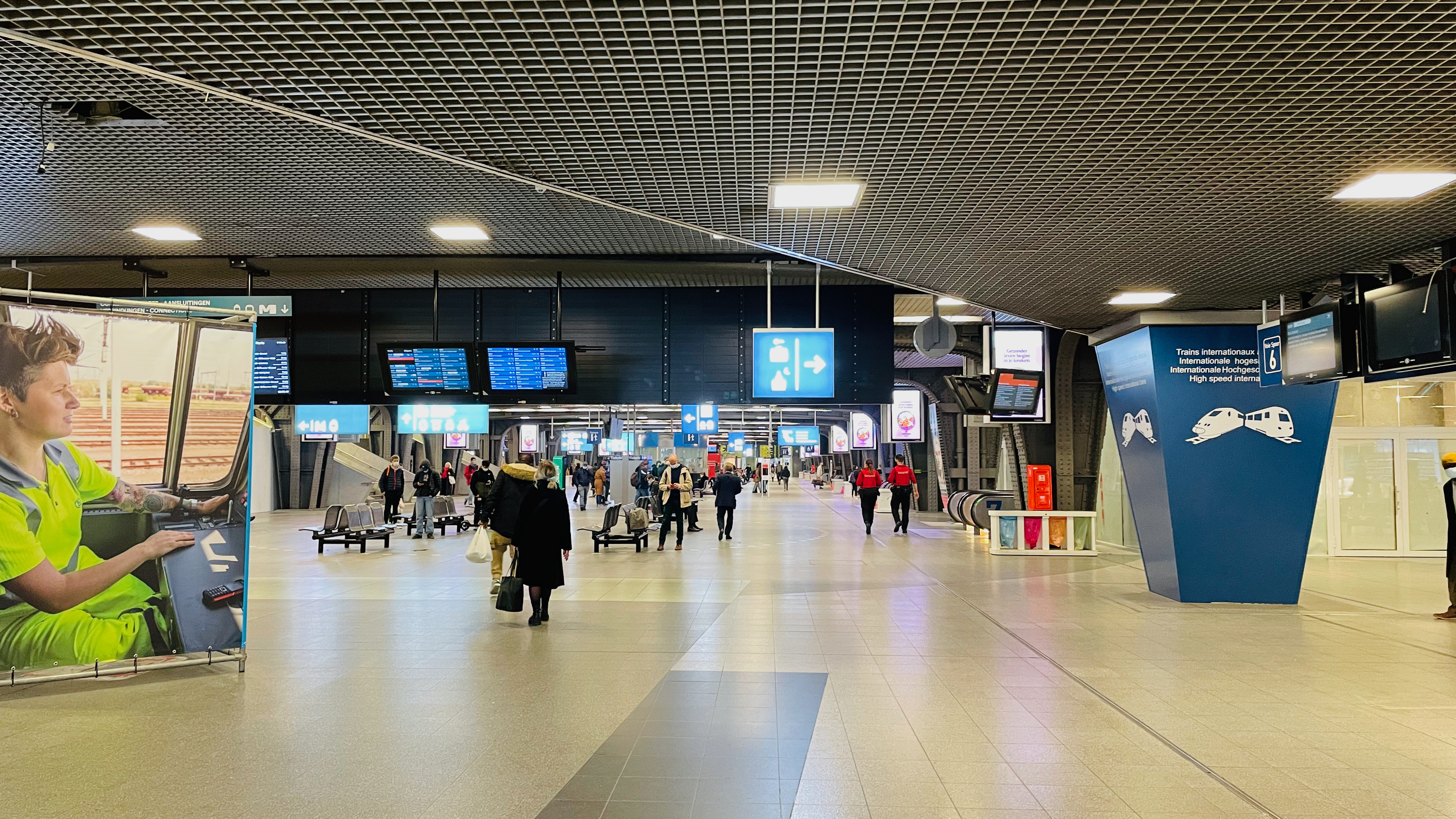
Main hall of Brussels-South railway station, home to the Eurostar train service to London

The Brussels-Capital Region has three main train stations: Brussels-South, Brussels-Central and Brussels-North, which are also the busiest of the country. Brussels-South is also served by direct high-speed rail links: to London by Eurostar trains via the Channel Tunnel; to Amsterdam by Eurostar "Red" (previously Thalys) and InterCity connections; to Amsterdam, Paris, and Cologne by Eurostar; and to Cologne and Frankfurt by the German ICE.

The train rails in Brussels go underground, near the centre, through the North–South connection, with the Central Station also being largely underground. The tunnel itself is only six tracks wide at its narrowest point, which often causes congestion and delays due to heavy use of the route.

The City of Brussels has minor railway stations at Bockstael, Brussels-Chapel, Brussels-Congress, Brussels-Luxembourg, Brussels-Schuman, Brussels-West, Haren, Haren-South and Simonis. In the Brussels Region, there are also railways stations at Berchem-Sainte-Agathe, Boitsfort, Boondael, Bordet (Evere), Etterbeek, Evere, Forest-East, Forest-South, Jette, Meiser (Schaerbeek), Moensberg (Uccle), Saint-Job (Uccle), Schaarbeek, Uccle-Calevoet, Uccle-Stalle, Vivier d'Oie-Diesdelle (Uccle), Merode and Watermael.

=== Public transport ===
The Brussels Intercommunal Transport Company (STIB/MIVB) is the local public transport operator in Brussels. It covers the 19 municipalities of the Brussels-Capital Region and some surface routes extend to the near suburbs in the other two regions, linking with the De Lijn network in Flanders and the TEC network in Wallonia.

==== Metro, trams and buses ====
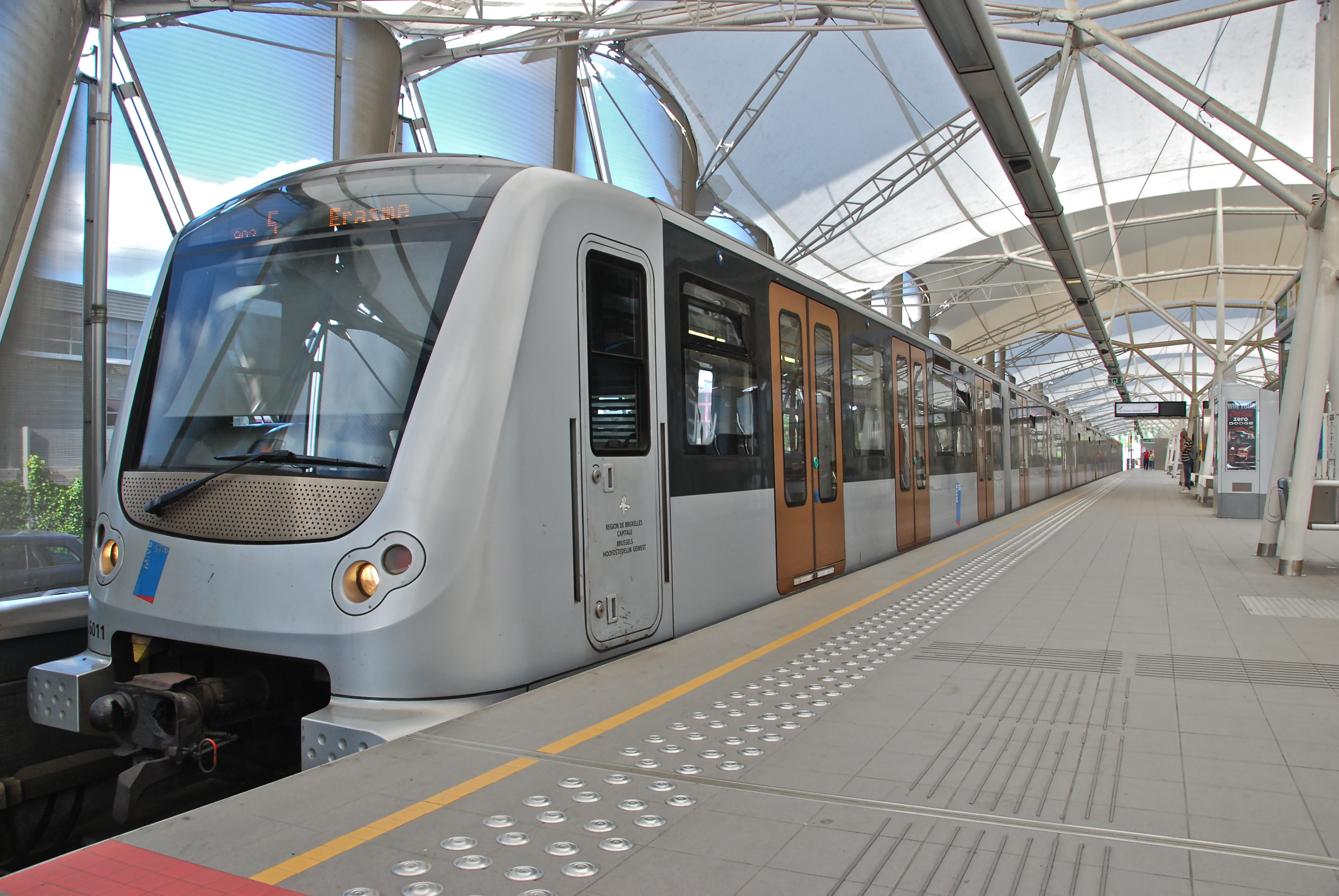
Brussels Metro carriage at Erasme/Erasmus metro station

The Brussels Metro dates back to 1976, but underground lines known as the premetro have been serviced by tramways since 1968. It is the only rapid transit system in Belgium. The network consists of four conventional metro lines and three premetro lines. The metro-grade lines are M1, M2, M5, and M6, with some shared sections, covering a total of 40 km (25 mi). As of 2017, the Metro network within the region has a total of 69 metro and premetro stations. The Metro is an important means of transport, connecting with six railway stations of the National Railway Company of Belgium (SNCB/NMBS), and many tram and bus stops operated by STIB/MIVB, as well as with Flemish De Lijn and Walloon TEC bus stops.

A comprehensive bus and tram network covers the region. As of 2017, the Brussels tram system consists of 17 tram lines (three of which – lines T4, T7 and T10 – qualify as premetro lines that partly travel over underground sections that were intended to be eventually converted into metro lines). The total route length is 139 km (86 mi), making it one of the largest tram networks in Europe. The Brussels bus network is complementary to the rail network. It consists of 50 bus routes and 11 night routes, spanning 445 km (277 mi).

Since April 2007, STIB/MIVB has also been operating a night bus network called Noctis on Friday and Saturday nights from midnight until 3 a.m. The fare on these night buses is the same as during the day. All the lines leave from the Place de la Bourse/Beursplein in the city centre at 30 minutes intervals and cover all the main streets in the capital, as they radiate outwards to the suburbs.

==== Other public transport ====
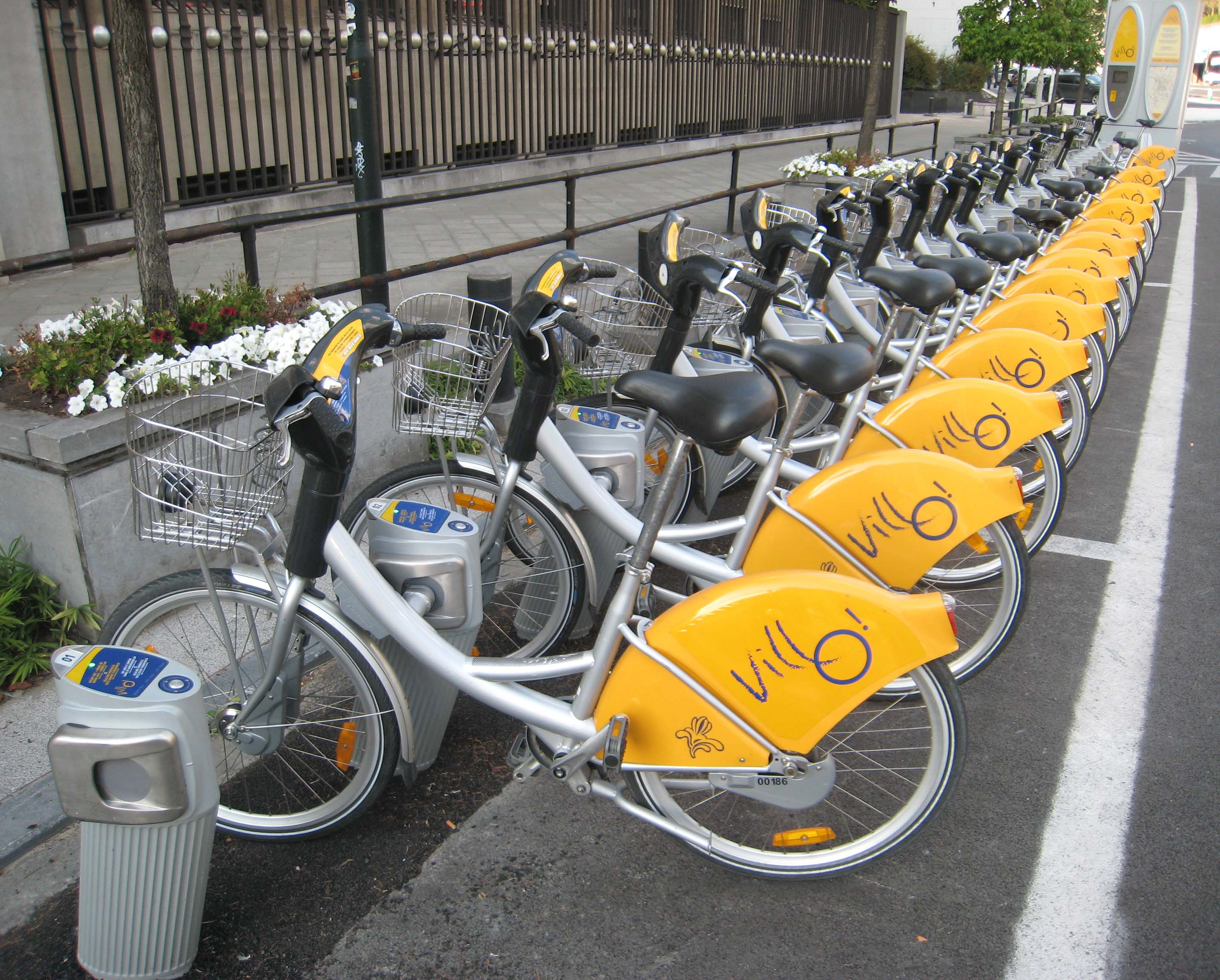
Villo! shared bicycles in Brussels

Since 2003, Brussels has had a car-sharing service operated by the Bremen company Cambio, in partnership with STIB/MIVB and the local ridesharing company Taxi Stop. In 2006, a public bicycle-sharing programme was introduced. The scheme was subsequently taken over by Villo!. Since 2008, this night-time public transport service has been supplemented by Collecto, a shared taxi system, which operates on weekdays between 11 p.m. and 6 a.m. In 2012, the Zen Car electric car-sharing scheme was launched in the university and European areas, though it ceased operating in the city in 2020.

=== Road network ===
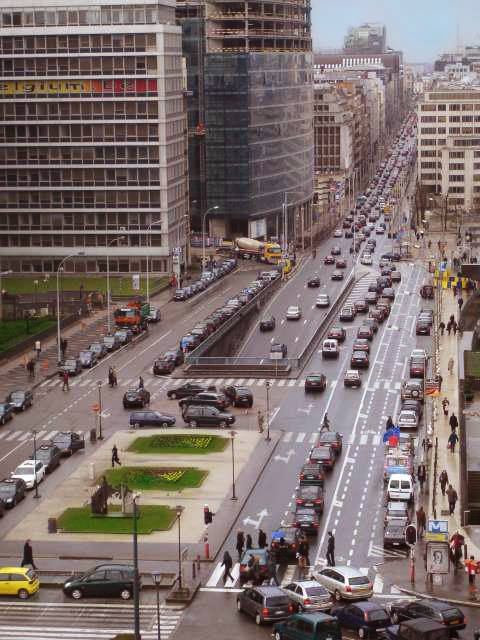
The Rue de la Loi/Wetstraat is one of the city's main streets.

In medieval times, Brussels stood at the intersection of routes running north–south (the modern Rue Haute/Hoogstraat) and east–west (Chaussée de Gand/Gentsesteenweg–Rue du Marché aux Herbes/Grasmarkt–Rue de Namur/Naamsestraat). The ancient street pattern, radiating from the Grand-Place, largely remains, but has been overlaid by boulevards built over the river Senne, over the city walls, and over the railway connection between the North and South Stations. The city is relatively car-dependent by northern European standards. In 2012, it had the most congested traffic in Europe and North America, according to US traffic information platform INRIX.

Brussels is the hub of a range of national roads, the main ones being clockwise: the N1 (N to Breda), N2 (E to Maastricht), N3 (E to Aachen), N4 (SE to Luxembourg), N5 (S to Reims), N6 (S to Maubeuge), N7 (SW to Lille), N8 (W to Koksijde) and N9 (NW to Ostend). Usually named chaussées/steenwegen, these roads normally run in a straight line, but sometimes lose themselves in a maze of narrow shopping streets. The region is skirted by the European route E19 (N-S) and the E40 (E-W), while the E411 leads away to the SE. Brussels has an orbital motorway, numbered R0 (R-zero) and commonly referred to as the Ring. It is pear-shaped, as the southern side was never built as originally conceived, owing to residents' objections.

The city centre, sometimes known as the Pentagon, is surrounded by an inner ring road, the Small Ring (French: Petite Ceinture, Dutch: Kleine Ring), a sequence of boulevards formally numbered R20. These were built on the site of the second set of city walls following their demolition. The Metro line 2 runs alongside (not actually under) many of these. Since June 2015, a number of central boulevards inside the Pentagon have become car-free, thereby limiting transit traffic through the old city.

On the eastern side of the region, the R21 or Greater Ring (French: Grande Ceinture, Dutch: Grote Ring) is formed by a series of boulevards that curve down from Laeken to Uccle. Some premetro stations (see Brussels Metro) were built along that route. A little further out, a stretch numbered R22 leads from Zaventem to Saint-Job.

== Security and emergency services ==
=== Police ===
The Brussels local police, supported by the federal police, is responsible for law enforcement in Brussels. The 19 municipalities of the Brussels-Capital Region are divided into six police zones, all bilingual (French and Dutch). In May 2026, the Belgian Chamber of Representatives adopted legislation to merge the six zones into a single police zone, with implementation scheduled to take effect on 1 January 2028. The new zone is planned to be organised into nine territorial divisions, in order to preserve local policing.

=== Fire department ===
The Brussels Fire and Emergency Medical Care Service, commonly known by its acronym SIAMU (DBDMH), operates in the 19 municipalities of Brussels. It is a class X fire department and the largest fire service in Belgium in terms of annual operations, equipment, and personnel. It has nine fire stations, spread over the entire Brussels-Capital Region, and employs about 1,000 professional firefighters. As well as preventing and fighting fires, SIAMU also provides emergency medical care services in Brussels via its centralised 100 number (and the single 112 emergency number for the 27 countries of the European Union). It is bilingual (French–Dutch).

== Parks and green spaces ==
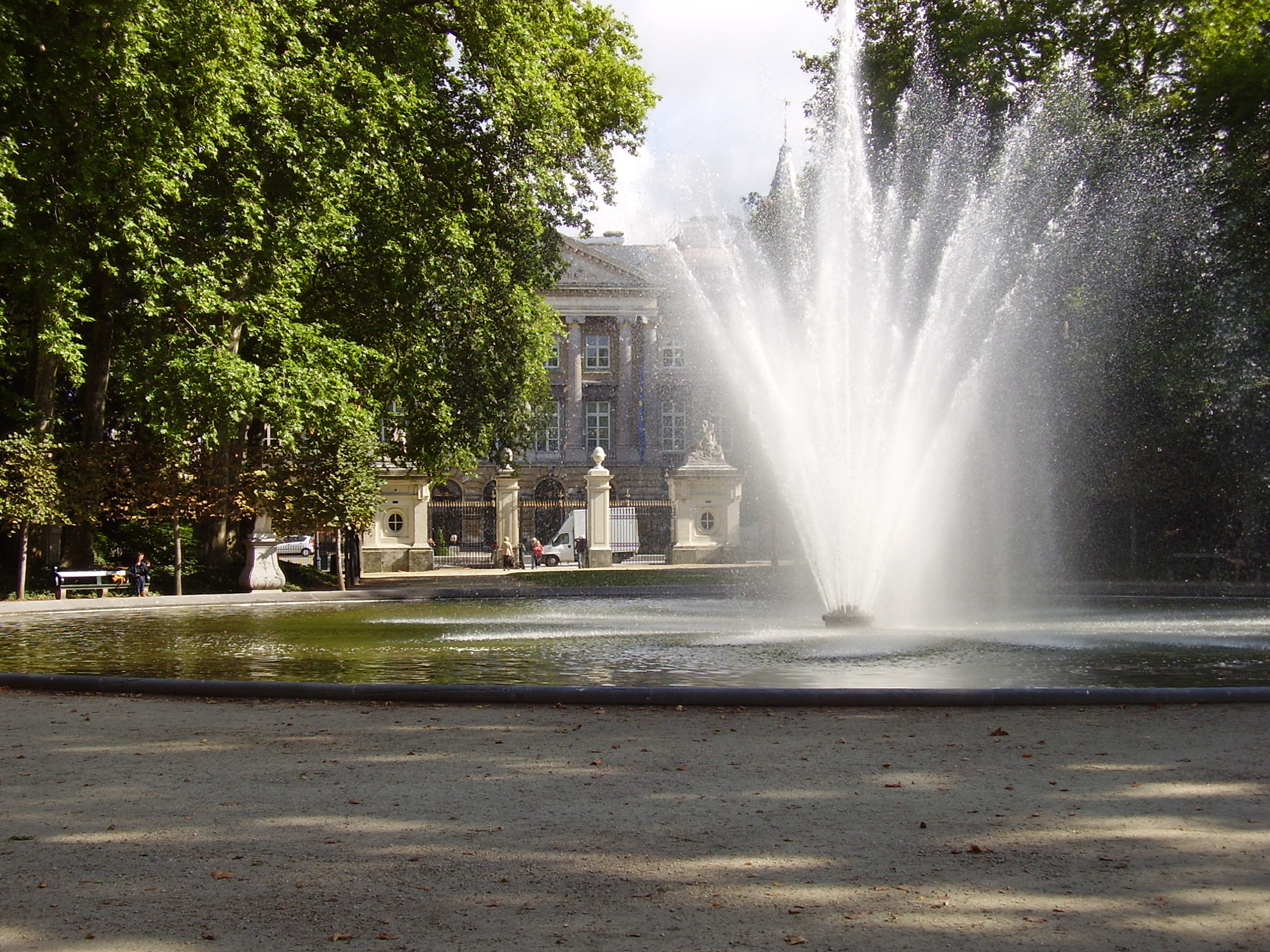
Brussels Park

Brussels is one of the greenest capitals in Europe, with over 8,000 hectares of green spaces. Vegetation cover and natural areas are higher in the outskirts, where they have limited the peri-urbanisation of the capital, but they decrease sharply towards the centre of Brussels; 10% in the central Pentagon, 30% of the municipalities in the first ring, and 71% of the municipalities in the second ring are occupied by green spaces.

Many parks and gardens, both public and privately owned, are scattered throughout the city. In addition to this, the Sonian Forest is located in its southern part and stretches out over the three Belgian regions. As of 2017, it has been inscribed as a UNESCO World Heritage Site, the only Belgian component to the multinational inscription 'Primeval Beech Forests of the Carpathians and Other Regions of Europe'.

== Partner cities and regions ==
Several of the municipalities within the Brussels-Capital Region have symbolic twin city agreements with municipalities elsewhere, but the Brussels Region itself has none. Besides cooperation with many other cities and regions through such institutions as the Assembly of European Regions and the European Forum for Urban Security, Brussels has direct bilateral cooperation or development agreements with the following cities and regions:

- Aichi
- Berlin
- Budapest
- Havana
- Île-de-France
- Kinshasa
- Kyiv
- Lille
- Luxembourg
- Quebec
- Rabat-Salé-Kénitra
- Ramallah and al-Bireh Governorate
- Seoul
- Tokyo

== See also ==
- Bourgeois of Brussels
- Nazi ghost train
- Seven Noble Houses of Brussels
- Sculpture in Brussels
- Brussels Regional Investment Company
- European Network of Information Centres for the Performing Arts
- List of urban areas in the European Union
