= Politics and government of the Brussels-Capital Region =

Regional government in Belgium

Government of the Brussels-Capital Region
- Gouvernement de la région de Bruxelles-Capitale; Brusselse Hoofdstedelijke Regering

Overview
- Established: 12 July 1989; 37 years ago
- Country: Belgium
- Polity: Brussels-capital Region
- Leader: Minister-President
- Appointed by: Parliament of the Brussels-Capital Region
- Headquarters: Hôtel de Grimbergen, City of Brussels
- Website: be.brussels

The government of the Brussels-Capital Region (French: Gouvernement de la Région de Bruxelles-Capitale [ɡuvɛʁnəmɑ̃ də la ʁeʒjɔ̃ də bʁysɛl kapital]; Dutch: Brusselse Hoofdstedelijke Regering [ˈbrʏsəlsə ˌɦoːftˈsteːdələkə rəˈɣeːrɪŋ]) is the political administration of the Brussels-Capital Region of Belgium. An election is held every five years. The government is headed by a minister-president (currently Boris Dilliès), four ministers and three state's secretaries.

The office of governor of Brussels-Capital was dissolved in 2014. This governor, appointed by the cabinet had held relatively limited power and enforced laws concerned with public order in the region.

The Brussels Region is divided into 19 municipalities. Each municipality has its own government, responsible for the handling of local level duties, such as law enforcement and the upkeep of schools and roads within its borders. Municipal administration is also conducted by a mayor, a council, and an executive.

== Parliament ==
The Parliament of the Brussels-Capital Region is also known as the Brussels Regional Parliament. It is the main decision-making body for the Brussels-Capital Region. Constitutionally, the Parliament is made up of 72 French-speaking members and 17 Dutch-speaking members.

=== Functions ===
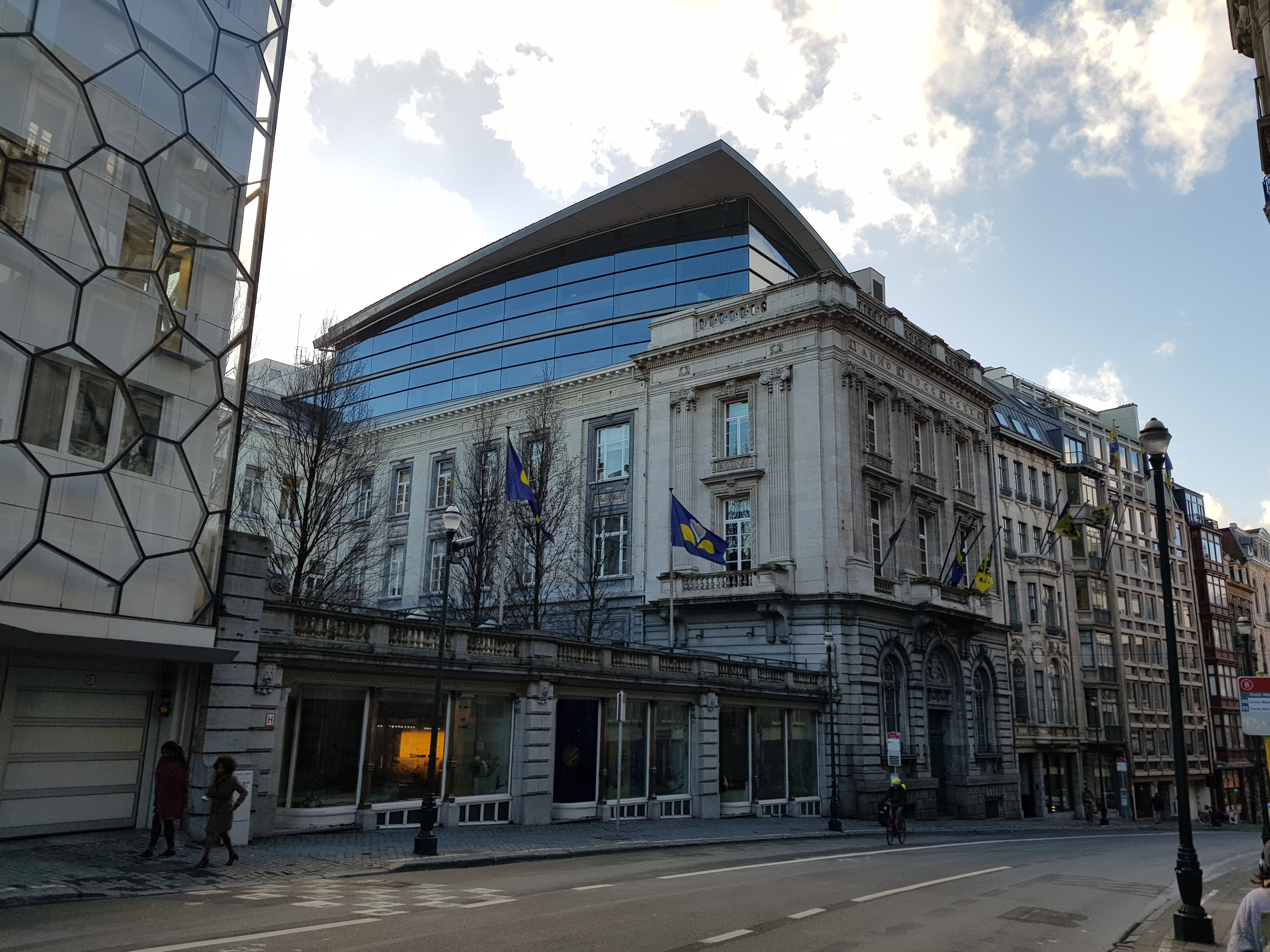
Brussels Parliament building

The Brussels Parliament role mainly consists in controlling the government of the Brussels-Capital Region, approving the budget and creating and passing legislation in regional matters, known as ordinances, which are legally binding. One of its first tasks after the Parliament is renewed is appointing five ministers and three regional secretaries of state, who together form the cabinet of the Brussels-Capital Region.

The 89 members of the Brussels Parliament are divided into two language groups: 72 belong to the French-speaking group and 17 members belong to the Dutch-speaking group. The members of the French-speaking group also make up the Parlement francophone bruxellois (in English: French-speaking Brussels Parliament), which was formerly known as the Assembly of the French Community Commission, while the members of the Dutch-speaking group make up the Council of the Flemish Community Commission. The Parlement francophone bruxellois and the Council of the Flemish Community Commission together form the United Assembly of the Common Community Commission. The Community Commissions are to a certain extent responsible for Community competencies within the Brussels-Capital Region.

19 of the 72 French-speaking members of the Brussels Parliament are also members of the Parliament of the French Community of Belgium. People voting for a Flemish party have to vote separately for 6 directly-elected members of the Flemish Parliament.

Due to the multiple capacities of single members, there are members of the Brussels Parliament who are at the same member of the Parliament of the French Community of Belgium and of the Belgian Senate as "community senators" for the French Community. However, there are certain restrictions in place in order to prevent one person from combining too many mandates. For instance, it is impossible to be a member of the Belgian Chamber of Representatives and of one of the regional parliaments at the same time.

== Cabinet ==
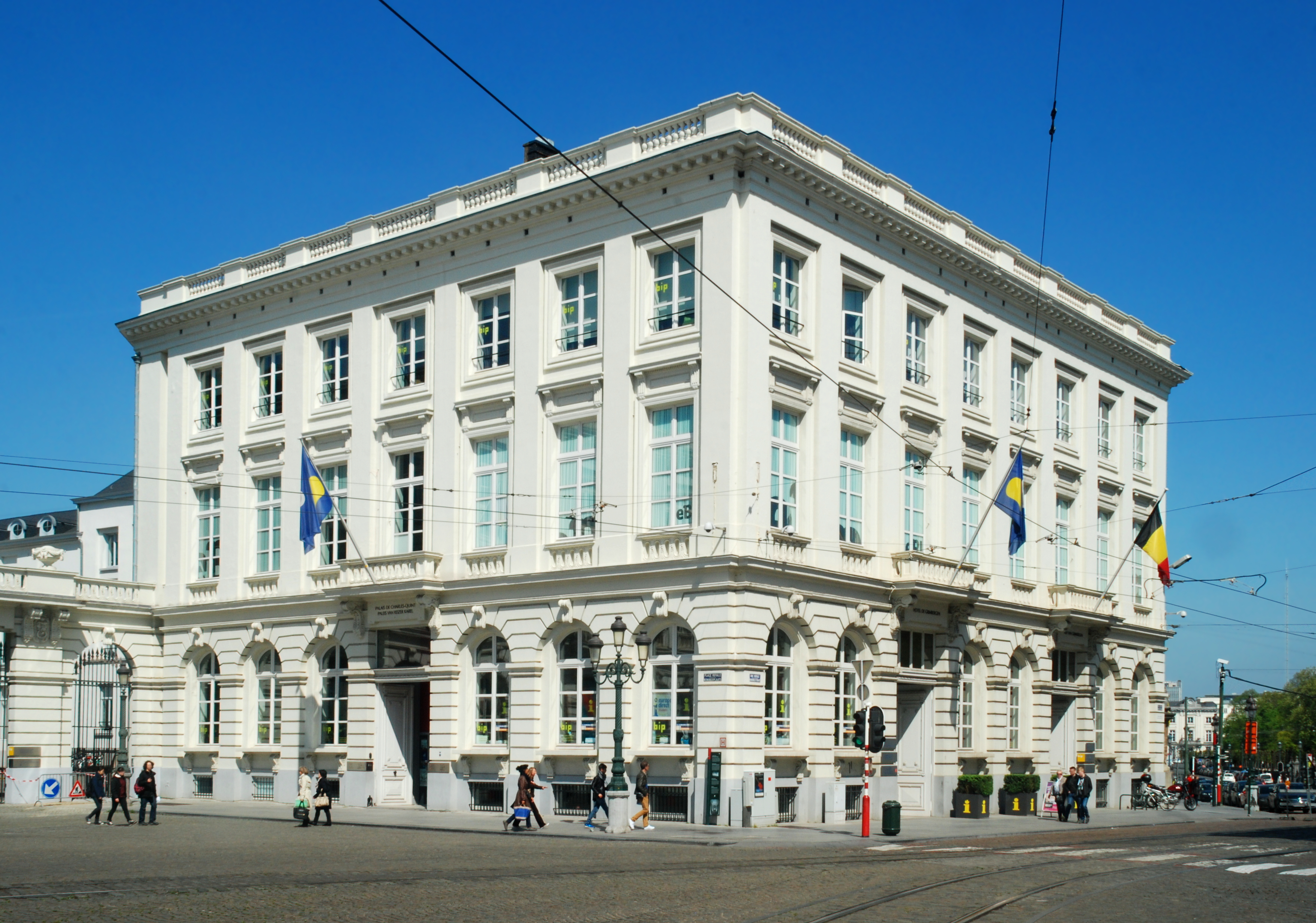
Hôtel de Grimbergen, Brussels

The cabinet of the Brussels-Capital Region comprises eight members, headed by a minister-president. There are four ministers in the cabinet, two of which must be French-speaking and two Flemish. Of the three more junior secretaries of state, at least one must be Flemish. The minister-president is in practice always a francophone, so the cabinet of the Region has 5 French-speaking and 3 Dutch-speaking members.

=== Compositions ===
==== Composition 2026–present ====
Government of the Brussels-Capital Region - Dilliès
Party	Name	Function
MR	Boris Dilliès	Minister-President; Minister of Security, Tourism, Energy, Scientific Research, External Relations, Siamu and Bicultural Matters
PS	Ahmed Laaouej	Minister of Local Government, Equal Opportunities, Health
LE	Laurent Hublet	Minister of Work and Economy
Groen	Elke Van den Brandt	Minister of Mobility, Public Works, Road Safety, and Animal Welfare
Anders	Dirk De Smedt	Minister of Budget, Finance, Public Service and Digitalisation
MR	Audrey Henry	Secretary of State for Urbanism and Cleanliness
PS	Karine Lalieux	Secretary of State for Housing, Taxi Sector and Sports Infrastructure
Vooruit	Ans Persoons	Secretary of State for Environment & Climate, Urban Renewal, Heritage and Image of Brussels

==== Composition 2019–2026 ====
Government of the Brussels-Capital Region - Vervoort III
Party	Name	Function
PS	Rudi Vervoort	Minister-President; Minister of Urban Renewal, Spatial Development, Safety & Prevention, Tourism, the image of Brussels and bicultural issues of regional importance, Student Affairs and Paying Passenger Transport
Groen	Elke Van den Brandt	Minister of Mobility, Public Works and Road Safety
Ecolo	Alain Maron	Minister of Environment & Climate, Social Integration, Health, Energy, Water, Cleanliness and the Port of Brussels
Open Vld	Sven Gatz	Minister of Finance, Budget, Civil Service, Promotion of Multilingualism, Tourism, Statistics, Urbanism, Heritage, the image of Brussels and bicultural issues of regional importance
DéFI	Bernard Clerfayt	Minister of Employment, Professional Education, Local Authorities, Digitization, Animal Welfare and Child Benefits
PS	Nawal Ben Hamou	Secretary of State for Equal Opportunities and Housing
one.brussels-sp.a	Pascal Smet	Secretary of State for Urbanism, European and International Affairs, Foreign Trade, Fire Fighting and Emergency Medical Assistance
Ecolo	Barbara Trachte	Secretary of State for Economic Transition and Research

==== Composition 2014–2019 ====
Government of the Brussels-Capital Region - Vervoort II
Party	Name	Function
PS	Rudi Vervoort	Minister-President; Minister of Local Authorities, Spatial Planning, Monuments and Landscapes, Student Affairs, Civil Service, Scientific Research and Public Proverty
Open Vld	Guy Vanhengel	Minister of Finance, Budget, Development Aid and Foreign Relations
DéFI	Didier Gosuin	Minister of Employment, Economy, Fire Department and Urgent Medical Care
sp.a	Pascal Smet	Minister of Public Works and Transport
CDH	Céline Fremault	Minister of Housing, Environment and Energy
PS	Fadila Laanan	Secretary of State for Collection and Processing of Waste, Scientific Research, Sports Infrastructure and Civil Service
DéFI	Cécile Jodogne	Secretary of State for Foreign Trade, Fire Department and Urgent Medical Care
CD&V	Bianca Debaets	Secretary of State for Development Aid, Road Traffic Safety, IT and Digital Transition, Equal Opportunities and Animal Welfare

==== Composition 2013–2014 ====
Government of the Brussels-Capital Region - Vervoort I
Party	Name	Function
PS	Rudi Vervoort	Minister-President; Minister of Local Authorities, Spatial Planning, Monuments and Landscapes, Development Aid and Statistics
VLD	Guy Vanhengel	Minister of Finance, Budget and Foreign Relations
CD&V	Brigitte Grouwels	Minister of Public Works, Transport, the Port of Brussels, and IT
Ecolo	Evelyne Huytebroeck	Minister of Environment, Energy, Water Jurisdiction and City Rejuvenation
CDH	Céline Fremault	Minister of Employment, Economy, Foreign Trade and Scientific Research
Groen	Bruno De Lille	Secretary of State for Mobility, Equal Opportunities and the Civil Service
PS	Rachid Madrane	Secretary of State for Town Planning, Collection and Processing of Waste and Environmental Maintenance
Ecolo	Christos Doulkeridis	Secretary of State for Housing/Habitation, Fire Department and Urgent Medical Care

==== Composition 2009–2013 ====
Government of the Brussels-Capital Region - Picqué IV
Party	Name	Function
PS	Charles Picqué	Minister-President; Minister of Local Authorities, Spatial Planning, Monuments and Landscapes, Development Aid and Statistics
VLD	Guy Vanhengel	Minister of Finance, Budget and Foreign Relations
CD&V	Brigitte Grouwels	Minister of Public Works, Transport, the Port of Brussels, and IT
Ecolo	Evelyne Huytebroeck	Minister of Environment, Energy, Water Jurisdiction and City Rejuvenation
CDH	Benoit Cerexhe	Minister of Employment, Economy, Foreign Trade and Scientific Research
Groen	Bruno De Lille	Secretary of State for Mobility, Equal Opportunities and the Civil Service
PS	Emir Kir	Secretary of State for Public Sanitation and Monument Conservation
Ecolo	Christos Doulkeridis	Secretary of State for Housing/Habitation, Fire Department and Urgent Medical Care

==== Composition 2004–2009 ====
After the elections of 2004, the French-speaking parties PS, Ecolo and CDH formed a coalition with the Dutch-speaking parties Open VLD, CD&V en SP.A.

Cabinet of the Brussels-Capital Region - Picqué III
Party	Name	Function
PS	Charles Picqué	Minister-President; Minister of Local Power, Urban Planning, Monuments and Landscapes, Urban Renovation, Housing/Habitation, Public Cleansing, Foreign Trade and Development Aid
Open VLD	Guy Vanhengel	Minister of Finance, Budget, Foreign Relations and regional IT
cdH	Benoît Cerexhe	Minister of Employment, Economy, Scientific Research, Fire Department and Urgent Medical Care
Ecolo	Evelyne Huytebroeck	Minister of Environment, Energy et Water Jurisdiction
sp.a	Pascal Smet	Minister of Mobility and Public Works
PS	Françoise Dupuis	Secretary of State for Housing/Habitation and Urbanism
PS	Emir Kir	Secretary of State for Public Cleansing, Monuments and Landscapes
CD&V	Brigitte Grouwels	Secretary of State for Public Service and the Port of Brussels

== List of governments ==
Minister-President	Time in office	Party
Charles Picqué (1st term)	12 July 1989 – 22 June 1995	PS
Charles Picqué (2nd term)	22 June 1995 – 15 July 1999	PS
Jacques Simonet (1st term)	15 July 1999 – 18 October 2000	PRL
François-Xavier de Donnéa	18 October 2000 – 6 June 2003	PRL/MR
Daniel Ducarme	6 June 2003 – 18 February 2004	MR
Jacques Simonet (2nd term)	18 February – 19 July 2004	MR
Charles Picqué (3rd term)	19 July 2004 – 19 July 2009	PS
Charles Picqué (4th term)	19 July 2009 – 7 May 2013	PS
Rudi Vervoort (1st term)	7 May 2013 – 20 July 2014	PS
Rudi Vervoort (2nd term)	20 July 2014 – 17 July 2019	PS
Rudi Vervoort (3rd term)	17 July 2019 – 14 February 2026	PS
Boris Dilliès	14 February 2026 – present	MR

== See also ==
- Flemish government
- Government of the French Community
- Minister-President of the Brussels-Capital Region
