= Speaker of the Parliament of the Brussels-Capital Region =

The speaker of the Flemish Parliament (Dutch: Voorzitter van het Parlement van het Brussels Hoofdstedelijk Gewest, French: Président du Parlement de la Région de Bruxelles-Capitale) is the presiding member of the Parliament of the Brussels-Capital Region, which is the legislature of Brussels (Belgium).

== List ==
No.	Name	Entered office	Left office	Legislative term(s)	Party
	Edouard Poullet	July 12, 1989	May 21 , 1995		Christian Social Party
	Armand De Decker	June 23, 1995	June 13 , 1999		Liberal Reformist Party
1	Magda De Galan	July 14, 1999	June 13 , 2004		Socialist Party (PS)
2	Éric Tomas	19 July 2004	7 June 2009		Socialist Party (PS)
3	Françoise Dupuis	July 16, 2009	May 25 , 2014		Socialist Party (PS)
4	Charles Picqué	10 June 2014	18 July 2019		Socialist Party (PS)
5	Rachid Madrane	18 July 2019	14 June 2024		Socialist Party (PS)
6	Bertin Mampaka Mankamba	25 June 2024	present		Reformist Movement (MR)
