= List of members of the Parliament of the Brussels-Capital Region, 2024–2029 =

This is the list of representatives in the Parliament of the Brussels-Capital Region for the 2024-2029 legislature. The Brussels-Capital Parliament has 89 members: 72 of them are French-speaking, the other 17 are Dutch-speaking.

This legislature followed the Brussels regional elections of 9 June 2024 and began on 25 June 2024. The opening session was chaired by senior dean Bertin Mampaka Mankamba (MR), who was assisted by the youngest member of each language group, for the Dutch language group Imane Belguenani (Open Vld) and for the French language group Mehdi Talbi (PTB).

The 72 French-speaking members of parliament are also part of the Brussels Francophone Parliament (PFB) and the 17 Dutch-speaking members of parliament of the Council of the Flemish Community Commission (RVGC), which have decision-making powers over the community powers that are autonomously governed by the French and Dutch language groups. These community commissions together form the United Assembly of the Common Community Commission (VVGGC), where community powers that require common agreement between both language groups are discussed.

== Composition ==
French language group			Dutch language group		
Party		Members	Party		Members
	Reformist Movement	20	•	Groen	4
•	Socialist Party	16		Team Fouad Ahidar	3
	Workers' Party of Belgium	15		New Flemish Alliance	2
	Les Engagés	8	•	Open Flemish Liberals and Democrats	2
•	Ecolo	7		Flemish Interest	1
•	DéFI	6	•	Vooruit	2
				Workers' Party of Belgium	1
				Christian Democratic and Flemish	1
				Independent	1
Total:		72	Total:		17
Total: 89 Members
A dot means: participating in the demissionary Brussels government.

== List of Members of Parliament ==
Name	Party		Language	Notes
Loubna Azghoud		MR	French	
Clémentine Barzin		MR	French	
Kristela Bytyçi		MR	French	
Geoffroy Coomans de Brachène		MR	French	
Aurélie Czekalski		MR	French	Chairman of the Bi-Community Affairs Committee (VVGGC).
Louis de Clippele		MR	French	
Ariane de Lobkowicz-d'Ursel		MR	French	
Ludivine de Magnanville		MR	French	Switched from the DéFI to the MR faction on September 5, 2024.
Vincent De Wolf		MR	French	Vice-Chairman (BHP/VVGGC). Also Chairman of the Committee on Home Affairs (BHP).
Anne-Charlotte d'Ursel		MR	French	Secretary (BHP/VVGGC).
Amin El Boujdaini		MR	French	
Aline Godfrin		MR	French	Replaces Hadja Lahbib, outgoing minister in the federal government, from 26 June 2024 .
Sadik Köksal		MR	French	Vice-Chairman (PFB).
David Leisterh		MR	French	Chairman of the MR faction (BHP/VVGGC).
Bertin Mampaka Mankamba		MR	French	From 26 July 2024, chairman of the BHP and the VVGGC and from 27 July 2024 chairman of the PFB. Also chairman of the Environment and Energy Committee (BHP).
Amélie Pans		MR	French	
Françoise Schepmans		MR	French	
Eléonore Simonet		MR	French	
Gaëtan Van Goidsenhoven		MR	French	Chairman of the MR faction (PFB).
Olivier Willocx		MR	French	
David Weytsman		MR	French	Additional member of the Extended Bureau (BHP/VVGGC).
Leila Agic	•	PS	French	
Mustapha Akouz	•	PS	French	Replaces Rudi Vervoort, outgoing minister in the Brussels-Capital Region Government, from 25 June 2024.
Martin Casier	•	PS	French	
Ibrahim Dönmez	•	PS	French	
Nadia El Yousfi	•	PS	French	
Isabelle Emmery	•	PS	French	Additional member of the Extended Bureau until September 16, 2024 (BHP/VVGGC) and secretary of the PFB. From September 16, 2024 secretary of the BHP and the VVGGC.
Marc-Jean Ghyssels	•	PS	French	Secretary (BHP/VVGGC).
Jamal Ikazban	•	PS	French	Chairman of the PS faction (PFB). Also chairman of the Mobility Committee (BHP).
Hasan Koyuncu	•	PS	French	Vice-Chairman (PFB).
Fadila Laanan	•	PS	French	
Ahmed Laaouej	•	PS	French	Chairman of the PS faction (BHP/VVGGC). Also chairman of the Finance and General Affairs Committee (BHP).
Mohamed Ouriaghli	•	PS	French	Vice-Chairman (BHP/VVGGC).
Yannick Piquet	•	PS	French	Replaces Nawal Ben Hamou, outgoing State Secretary in the Brussels-Capital Region Government, from 26 June 2024.
Sevket Temiz	•	PS	French	
Cécile Vainsel	•	PS	French	Replaces Karine Lalieux, outgoing minister in the federal government,, from 25 June 2024.
Yusuf Yildiz	•	PS	French	
Bruno Bauwens		PTB	French	Vice-Chairman (PFB).
Francis Dagrin		PTB	French	Vice-Chairman (BHP/VVGGC).
Octave Daube		PTB	French	
Françoise De Smedt		PTB	French	Chairman of the PTB faction (BHP/VVGGC).
Josiane Dostie		PTB	French	Chair of the Equal Opportunities and Women's Rights Commission (EOPC).
Mihaela Drozd		PTB	French	
Mohammed El Bouzidi		PTB	French	
Hanina El Hamamouchi		PTB	French	
Soulaimane El Mokadem		PTB	French	Additional member of the Extended Bureau (BHP/VVGGC).
Danaé Michaux Maimone		PTB	French	
Patricia Parga Vega		PTB	French	
Marisol Revelo Paredes		PTB	French	
Oliver Rittweger de Moor		PTB	French	Secretary (BHP/VVGGC).
Mehdi Talbi		PTB	French	Chairman of the Housing Committee (BHP).
Manon Vidal		PTB	French	Chairman of the PTB faction (PFB).
Sofia Bennani		Les Engagés	French	
Marie Cruysmans		Les Engagés	French	Secretary (PFB).
Christophe De Beukelaer		Les Engagés	French	Chairman of the Les Engagés faction (BHP/VVGGC).
Alain Deneef		Les Engagés	French	
Elhadj Moussa Diallo		Les Engagés	French	Secretary until September 16, 2024 (BHP/VVGGC) and Chairman of the Economic Affairs and Employment Committee (BHP).
Gladys Kazadi		Les Engagés	French	Chairman of the Les Engagés faction (PFB).
Mounir Laarissi		Les Engagés	French	Secretary from September 16, 2024 (BHP/VVGGC).
Stéphanie Lange		Les Engagés	French	
Margaux De Ré	•	Ecolo	French	
Isabelle Pauthier	•	Ecolo	French	On 16 September 2024, he replaced Alain Maron, outgoing minister in the Brussels-Capital Region Government .
John Pitseys	•	Ecolo	French	Replaces Barbara Trachte, outgoing State Secretary in the Brussels-Capital Region Government, from 25 June 2024. Pitseys is chair of the Ecolo group (BHP/VVGGC) and chair of the Budget and Accounts Committee of Parliament (BHP).
Matteo Segers	•	Ecolo	French	
Kalvin Soiresse Njall	•	Ecolo	French	Secretary (BHP/VVGGC).
Hicham Talhi	•	Ecolo	French	Replaces Zakia Khattabi, outgoing minister in the federal government, from 25 June 2024 .
Farida Tahar	•	Ecolo	French	Replaces Marie Lecocq from 16 September 2014, who resigned after her election as co-president of Ecolo. Previously, she replaced Alain Maron, outgoing minister in the Brussels-Capital Region Government , from 25 June to 16 September 2024. Tahar is president of the Ecolo faction in the PFB.
Jonathan de Patoul	•	DéFI	French	Chairman of the DéFI faction (BHP/VVGGC).
Cécile Jodogne	•	DéFI	French	Chairman of the DéFI faction (PFB).
Fabian Maingain	•	DéFI	French	
Joëlle Maison	•	DéFI	French	Secretary until September 16, 2024 (BHP/VVGGC).
Gisèle Mandaila Malamba	•	DéFI	French	Replaces Bernard Clerfayt, outgoing minister in the Brussels-Capital Region Government, from 25 June 2024 .
Stijn Bex	•	Groen	Dutch	Replaces Elke Van den Brandt, outgoing minister in the Brussels Capital Region Government, from 25 June 2024. Bex is chair of the Green faction (BHP/VVGGC/RVGC).
Celia Groothedde	•	Groen	Dutch	Secretary (BHP/VVGGC) and Chairman of the Health and Personal Assistance Committee (VVGGC).
Emile Luhahi	•	Groen	Dutch	Secretary (RVGC).
Lotte Stoops	•	Groen	Dutch	Vice-Chairman (BHP/VVGGC) and from 27 June 2024 Chairman of the RVGC. Also Chairman of the Territorial Development Committee (BHP) and Chairman of the General Affairs, Finance, Budget and Urban Policy Committee (RVGC).
Fouad Ahidar		Team Fouad Ahidar	Dutch	Chairman of the Team Fouad Ahidar faction (BHP/VVGGC/RVGC).
Najima El Arbaoui		Team Fouad Ahidar	Dutch	Vice-Chairman (RVGC) and Chairman of the Education and School Construction Committee in the RVGC.
Ilyas El Omari		Team Fouad Ahidar	Dutch	Secretary (BHP/VVGGC).
Gilles Verstraeten		New Flemish Alliance	Dutch	Replaced Cieltje Van Achter from 4 October 2024, who became a minister in the Flemish government. Van Achter was chairman of the N-VA faction in the BHP and the VVGGC and secretary of the RVGC until 30 September 2024.
Mathias Vanden Borre		New Flemish Alliance	Dutch	Secretary (BHP/VVGGC), chairman of the N-VA faction in the RVGC and chairman of the Culture, Youth and Sports Committee in the RVGC.
Imane Belguenani	•	Open Vld	Dutch	Chairman of the Open Vld faction (BHP/VVGGC/RVGC).
Martine Raets	•	Open Vld	Dutch	Replaces Sven Gatz, outgoing minister in the Brussels Capital Region Government, from 25 June 2024. Raets is secretary (BHP/VVGGC/RVGC) and chairman of the Welfare, Health and Family Committee in the RVGC.
Ilyas Mouani	•	Vooruit	Dutch	Replaces Ans Persoons, outgoing State Secretary in the Brussels-Capital Region Government, from 25 June 2024. Mouani is chairman of the Vooruit.brussels faction in the RVGC.
Pascal Smet	•	Vooruit	Dutch	Chairman of the Vooruit.brussels faction (BHP/VVGGC) and secretary (RVGC).
Bob De Brabandere		Vlaams Belang	Dutch	Chairman of the Flemish Interest faction (BHP/VVGGC/RVGC).
Sonja Hoylaerts		Independent	Dutch	Switched from Vlaams Belang to Independent on December 17, 2024.
Benjamin Dalle		Christian Democratic and Flemish	Dutch	Chairman of the CD&V faction (BHP/VVGGC/RVGC).
Jan Busselen		PTB	Dutch	Chairman of the PVDA faction (BHP/VVGGC/RVGC).
