= Vervoort III Government =

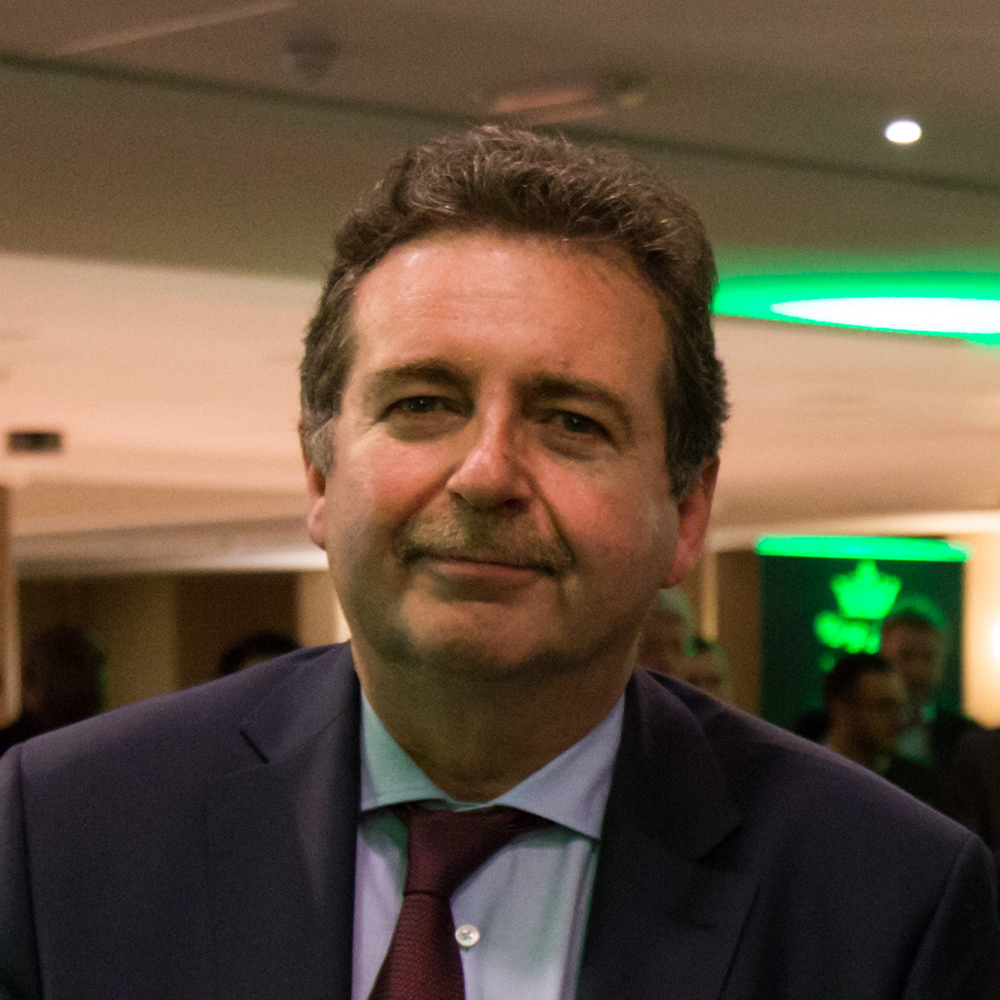

History
- Election: 2019
- Outgoing election: 2024
- Predecessor: Vervoort II
- Successor: Dilliès government

The Vervoort III government was the coalition government of the Brussels-Capital Region from 18 July 2019 until 13 February 2026. Following the 2024 regional elections, it took over 600 days to form the succeeding Dilliès government.

Headed by socialist minister-president Rudi Vervoort, a French speaker, the coalition consisted of six parties: PS, Ecolo, DéFI on the francophone side, and Groen, Open Vld and one.brussels-sp.a (one.brussels-Vooruit) on the Dutch-speaking side. Minister-president Vervoort headed the capital region since 2013.

== Policy ==
Since assuming office in 2013, the Vervoort governments I, II and III have implemented several key policies in the Brussels-Capital Region.

- Plan Régional de Développement Durable (PRDD) / Regional Sustainable Development Plan: This plan outlines the long-term vision for Brussels, focusing on sustainable urban development, housing, mobility, and environmental quality.
- GoodMove: This plan for 2020-2030 introduced measures to improve public transportation, promote cycling, and reduce car usage to enhance mobility within the region.
- Plan Lumière / Lighting Plan: The plan brought additional street lighting to Brussels, notably around the Brussels Canal. Based on a 2012 plan, it was part of the coalition agreement (déclaration de politique régionale) of Vervoort II, ruling from 2014 until 2019.
- Climate Plan: Published in 2018 and updated in 2022, the plan aims for carbon neutrality of public buildings by 2040 and carbon neutrality of the territory of the City of Brussels by 2050. The City of Brussels is only a part of the Brussels capital region.
- Plan Nature: Adopted in 2016, it aims to protect and enhance biodiversity in Brussels, enabling better access to green spaces for citizens, and promoting urban nature conservation.

== Composition ==
=== Regional government ===
| Office | Office holder | Party |
|---|---|---|
| Minister-president, Développement territorial et de la Rénovation urbaine, du Tourisme, de Promotion de l'image de Bruxelles et du Biculturel d'intérêt régional | Rudi Vervoort | PS |
| Ministre de la Mobilité, des Travaux publics et de la Sécurité routière | Elke Van den Brandt | Groen |
| Ministre de la Transition climatique, de l'Environnement, de l'Énergie et de la Démocratie participative | Alain Maron | Ecolo |
| Ministre des Finances, du Budget, de la Fonction publique, de la Promotion du multilinguisme et de l'image de Bruxelles | Sven Gatz | Open VLD |
| Ministre de l'Emploi, de la Formation professionnelle, de la Transition numérique, des Pouvoirs locaux et du Bien-être animal | Bernard Clerfayt | DéFI |
| State secretary Logement et à l'Égalité des chances (under Rudi Vervoort) | Nawal Ben Hamou | PS |
| State secretary à la Transition économique et à la Recherche scientifique (auprès d'Alain Maron) | Barbara Trachte | Ecolo |
| State secretary à l'Urbanisme et au Patrimoine, aux Relations européennes et internationales, au Commerce extérieur, à la Lutte contre l'incendie, et à l'Aide médicale urgente (auprès de Sven Gatz) | Pascal Smet (jusqu'au 18/06/2023) | sp.a |
| State secretary à l'Urbanisme et au Patrimoine, aux Relations européennes et internationales, au Commerce extérieur, à la Lutte contre l'incendie, et à l'Aide médicale urgente (auprès de Sven Gatz) | Ans Persoons (à partir du 19/06/2023) | sp.a |
