= Dilliès government =

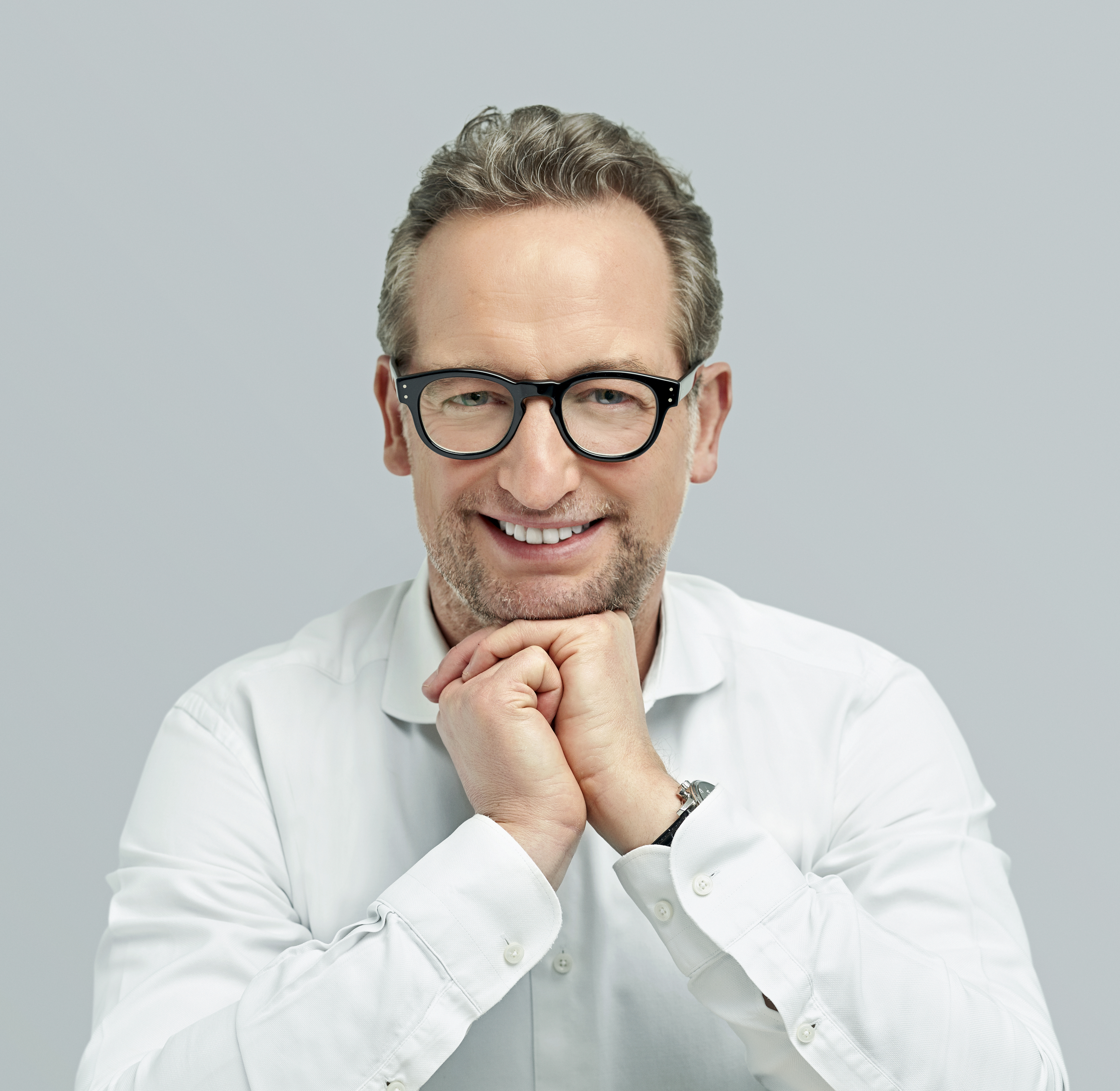
- Date formed: 12 February 2026 (613 days after election)

History
- Election: 9 June 2024
- Predecessor: Vervoort III Government

The Dilliès government is the current government of the Brussels-Capital Region led by the liberal minister-president Boris Dilliès (MR). Besides the MR, the seven-party coalition includes the French-speaking Socialist Party PS and centrist Les Engagés, and on the Flemish side the Greens (Groen), centre-left Vooruit, the liberals (Open Vld) and the Christian Democrats (CD&V). It took 613 days to form the coalition after the election.

== Formation ==
Due to its multilingual heritage, Brussels requires a majority in both its language groups (Dutch and French) to govern. It took nearly twenty months after elections in 2024 for government to form, when Georges-Louis Bouchez, leader of the MR party, proposed a "conclave" to effectively lock the negotiating parties together until a deal was formed. The government was sworn in on the 14th of February, 2026.

== Policy ==
Due to the delay in forming a government, one of the Dilliès government's major challenges is the capital's finances. Belgium's system of "provisional twelfths" allowed government services to keep running based on the budget of previous years while no government was formed, but it also meant that Brussels was more than €16 billion in debt by the time the Dilliès government was formed. The coalition has pledged to balance the budget by the time of Brussels' next elections in 2029 by consolidating regional governments and administration.

Dilliès' government has also pledged to cut back on several environmental projects begun by the previous administration: to halt the metro 3 construction, reduce the fines for Brussels's Low Emissions Zone, and cut back on areas of the city where traffic would be reduced. Changes in the government's climate policy also delayed the city's passage of a Social Climate Plan to receive European Union funding to offset the ETS2 carbon tax.

== Composition ==
The government is divided between Dutch- and French-speaking politicians: De Smedt, Van den Brandt, and Persoons are Flemish politicians, while Dilliès, Laaouej, Hublet, Henry, and Lalieux are French.

Office	Office holder	Party
Minister-President of the Brussels-Capital Region	Boris Dilliès	MR
Minister of Finance, Budget, Civil Service, Administrative Simplification and Digitalisation	Dirk De Smedt	Anders
Minister for the Economy, the Digital Economy and Employment	Laurent Hublet	Les Engagés
Minister for Mobility, Public Works, Road Safety and Animal Welfare	Elke Van den Brandt	Groen
Minister for Local Government, Equal Opportunities, and Health	Ahmed Laaouej	PS
Secretary of State for the Environment, responsible for Climate, Urban Renewal, Heritage and the Image of Brussels.	Ans Persoons	Vooruit
Secretary of State for Urban Planning and Cleanliness	Audrey Henry	MR
Secretary of State for Housing	Karine Lalieux	PS
