= Henri Simonet =

Belgian politician (1931–1996)

European Commissioner for Taxation and Energy
- In office 6 January 1973 – 6 January 1977
- President: François-Xavier Ortoli
- Preceded by: Position established Wilhelm Haferkamp (Internal Market and Energy)
- Succeeded by: Richard Burke (Taxation, Consumer Affairs and Transport); Guido Brunner (Energy, the Science and Research)

Personal details
- Born: 10 May 1931; Brussels, Belgium
- Died: 15 February 1996 (aged 64)
- Political party: Socialist Party
- Children: Jacques Simonet
- Relatives: Eléonore Simonet (granddaughter)

Henri François Simonet (10 May 1931 – 15 February 1996) was a Belgian politician.

Born in Brussels, Henri Simonet studied law and economics at the ULB and then went to Columbia University as CRB Graduate Fellow. Simonet began his political life as a member of the Socialist Party (PS). He served as mayor of Anderlecht between 1966 and 1984, succeeding the long-serving Joseph Bracops. Like Bracops, Simonet dominated the local political scene to such an extent that the ambitious Philippe Moureaux moved to neighbouring Molenbeek-Saint-Jean to pursue a career there. In 1985 Simonet left the Socialists to join the Liberal Reformist Party (PRL) where he espoused increasingly Atlanticist positions.

As mayor of Anderlecht, Simonet presided over considerable changes to what had been a largely industrial and working-class community, attracting new development in the form of the Erasmus Hospital, a teaching hospital tied to the ULB on whose administrative council Simonet served.

Christian D'Hoogh succeeded Simonet as mayor of Anderlecht.

Simonet served as vice-chairman of the European Commission from 1973 to 1977 and as Minister for Regional Economic Development in 1978 and 1979. On the national plan, Simonet served as Minister of Foreign Affairs and before as Minister of Economics Affairs.

His son Jacques Simonet, who made his political career in the liberal Liberal Reformist Party, served twice as Minister-President of the Brussels-Capital Region (1999-2000; 2004) and as mayor of Anderlecht from 2000 until his death in 2007. They are buried together in the cemetery of Anderlecht

Political offices
Preceded by Joseph Bracops	Mayor of Anderlecht; 1966–1984	Succeeded by Christian D'Hoogh
Preceded by Edmond Leburton	Minister of Economic Affairs; 1972–1973	Succeeded by Willy Claes
Preceded by Albert Coppé	Belgian European Commissioner; 1973–1977	Succeeded by Étienne Davignon
New office	European Commissioner for Taxation and Energy; 1973–1977	Succeeded by Richard Burke as European Commissioner for Taxation, Consumer Affairs and Transport
Preceded by Wilhelm Haferkamp as European Commissioner for the Internal Market and Energy	European Commissioner for Taxation and Energy; 1973–1977	Succeeded by Guido Brunner as European Commissioner for Energy, the Science and Research
Preceded by Renaat Van Elslande	Minister of Foreign Affairs; 1977–1980	Succeeded by Charles-Ferdinand Nothomb
