= Governor of the Administrative Arrondissement Brussels-Capital =

Until 2014, the governor of the Administrative Arrondissement of Brussels-Capital (French: Gouverneur de Bruxelles-Capitale; Dutch: Gouverneur van Brussel-Hoofdstad) had the responsibility to enforce laws concerned with public order in the Brussels-Capital Region, one of the three regions of Belgium. The governor's powers were actually quite limited. Just as the governors of the provinces of Belgium, he headed the coordination of all necessary actions and emergency services during the provincial phase of a disaster on the territory of the Brussels-Capital Region.

The governor of Brussels-Capital should not be confused with either the Minister-President of the Brussels-Capital Region nor with the mayor of the City of Brussels, which is one of the 19 municipalities of Brussels. The governor was appointed by the government of the Brussels-Capital Region on the unanimous advice of the Federal Council of Ministers. The regional government also appointed the vice-governor, who was required to have a considerable knowledge of both French and Dutch and who had a duty to ensure that the legislation regarding the use of languages was observed in the Brussels Region.

The agreement following the 2011 state reform included the removal of this post and it was abolished in 2014. Instead, there is a high official appointed by the Brussels Government.

== List of governors ==
- André Degroeve, 1 January 1995 – 30 April 1998
- Raymonde Dury, May 1998 – 13 November 1998
- Véronique Paulus de Châtelet, 22 December 1998 – 1 January 2009
- Hugo Nys (acting), 1 January 2009 – October 2010
- Jean Clément (acting), October 2010 – 2014
