= Stéphane de Lobkowicz =

Belgian politician (born 1957)

Member of the Brussels Parliament for the French Community Commission
- In office 12 July 1989 – 7 June 2009

Personal details
- Born: 29 July 1957 (age 69) Leuven, Belgium
- Party: Liberal Reformist Party (1989-2001); Centre démocrate humaniste (2001-present)
- Spouse: Barbara d'Ursel de Lobkowicz
- Children: 3 (including Ariane de Lobkowicz-d'Ursel)
- Occupation: Lawyer, author
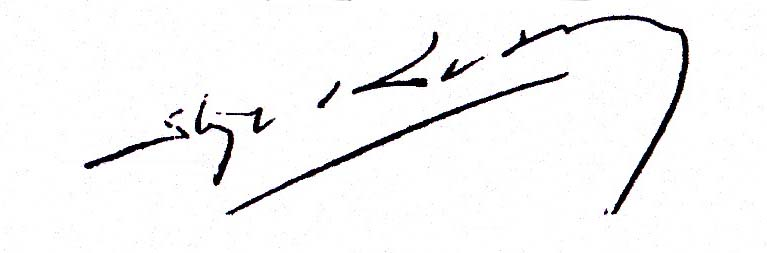
- Signature

Prince Stéphane de Lobkowicz (born 29 July 1957) is a Belgian lawyer, author, and politician who served in the Brussels Parliament.

== Biography ==
A member of the Lobkowicz noble family, he is a member of the Brussels Bar and wrote a biography about King Baudouin and an uchronie about Queen Astrid, Queen Astrid Did Not Die In Kussnacht'. He married Barbara d'Ursel de Lobkowicz, also a member of the Brussels Parliament.

He was elected to the Brussels Parliament in 1989 and served until 2009.

His daughter Ariane de Lobkowicz-d'Ursel was elected to the Brussels Parliament in 2019.
