= Fabrizio Bucella =

Belgian physicist, science communicator, and sommelier

- Fabrizio Bucella in 2022
- Born: 11 December 1973 (age 52); Milan, Italy
- Citizenship: Belgian
- Education: Université libre de Bruxelles (PhD)
- Occupations: Physicist, university professor, science communicator, sommelier, author
- Employer: Université libre de Bruxelles
- Notable work: L'anti-guide du vin (The Anti-Guide to Wine); Les tribulations œnologiques du Professeur Bucella (The Oenological Tribulations of Professor Bucella); L'anti-guide de la bière (The Anti-Guide to Beer)

Fabrizio Bucella (born 11 December 1973) is a Belgian physicist, author, and sommelier of Italian origin. He is a professor at the Université libre de Bruxelles, where he teaches physics and mathematics. Bucella is also a well-known science communicator and media personality, appearing regularly on television and radio in Belgium and France to discuss scientific topics, wine, and beer. He has authored several books on oenology and zythology.

== Early life and education ==
Bucella was born in Milan, Italy, to Italian parents. He moved to Belgium at the age of five, initially speaking no French. His father worked as a proofreader for the Italian newspaper Corriere della Sera, and his mother was a German teacher. His interest in science was sparked by an astrophysics lecture at his school and by reading Stephen Hawking's A Brief History of Time.

While studying physics at the Université libre de Bruxelles, Bucella became the president of the Fédération des étudiants francophones (FEF) in July 1995, succeeding Philippe Henry. He went on to earn a doctorate in physics.

== Career ==
Bucella is a professor of physics and mathematics at the Université libre de Bruxelles. In addition to his academic work, he has been involved in political spheres, serving in the cabinets of socialist ministers Françoise Dupuis and Marie Arena.

His career as a science communicator took off in 2022 when he began posting educational videos on social media platforms, including Instagram and TikTok, encouraged by his students. His videos quickly gained popularity, and by 2026, he had accumulated over 1.2 million subscribers across his various platforms.

Starting around 2025, Bucella achieved broader notoriety through regular appearances on Belgian television, notably on the RTBF and LN24 networks. He also became a regular panelist on the popular French radio show Les Grosses Têtes on RTL. During the summer of 2026, he hosted a science segment on France Inter.

Bucella is also a recognized sommelier and has written several books focusing on wine and beer appreciation, aiming to make oenology and zythology accessible to a wider audience.

== Bibliography ==
L'anti-guide du vin (The Anti-Guide to Wine), Dunod, 2022

Les tribulations œnologiques du Professeur Bucella et autres chroniques du vin (The Oenological Tribulations of Professor Bucella and Other Wine Chronicles), Flammarion, 2022

L'anti-guide de la bière (The Anti-Guide to Beer), Dunod, 2023

Trouvez le vin qui (vous) va bien (Find the Wine That Suits You), Flammarion, 2023

Pourquoi boit-on du vin ? (Why Do We Drink Wine?), Dunod, 2023

À la recherche du vin perdu (In Search of Lost Wine), Dunod, 2025

Mon cours d'accords mets et vins (My Course on Food and Wine Pairings), Dunod, 2025

Umami, Dunod, 2025

Comment gagner à pile ou face ? - et autre énigmes scientifiques ébouriffantes (How to Win at Heads or Tails? - and Other Astonishing Scientific Enigmas), Allary Éditions, 2025

Comment rester au sec avec une veste mouillée ? - Et encore plus d'énigmes scientifiques ébouriffantes (How to Stay Dry in a Wet Jacket? - And Even More Astonishing Scientific Enigmas), Allary Éditions, 2026
