= Antoine Duquesne =

Belgian politician (1941–2010)

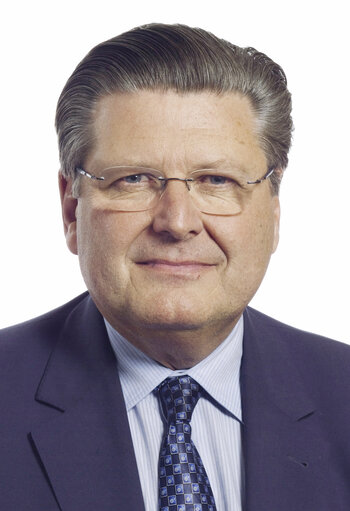
- Born: Antoine Duquesne; 3 February 1941; Ixelles, Belgium
- Died: 4 November 2010 (aged 69); Brussels, Belgium
- Occupation: politician

Antoine Duquesne (French: [ɑ̃twan dykɛːn]; 3 February 1941 – 4 November 2010) was a Belgian politician and Member of the European Parliament for the French Community of Belgium with the MR/MCC/PRL, Member of the Bureau of the Alliance of Liberals and Democrats for Europe.

== Career ==
In 1965, Duquesne became a Doctor of Law at the University of Liège. From 1965 to 1971 he served as an assistant lecturer in the Faculty of Law of that university. He was a practising lawyer from 1965 to 1975 and again from 1988.

From 1975 to 1977 he was Deputy Secretary-General of the National Committee for Training and Further Training in Trade and Commerce. Frol 1977 to 1982 he served as general administrator of the National Committee for Coordination and Dialogue on Continuing Education for Small Businesses and the French-Speaking Institute for Continuing Training for Small Businesses. From 1983 to 1988 he was the Director of the National Fund for Professional Credit.

=== Political career ===
From 1973 to 1987 Duquesne served as an advisor and chief of staff to various liberal state secretaries and ministers. In 1988 he was elected a member of the Municipal Council of Manhay and was reelected in 1994 and 2000. He served until his resignation in 2003. From 1995 to 1999 he also served as mayor of Manhay. From 1994 to 2004 he was Chairman of the MR Federation of the Province of Luxembourg.

From 1987 to 1988 Duquesne served as Minister of Education. In 1988 Duquesne was elected a member of the Belgian Senate. In 1990 Duquesne was made President of the PRL. In 1991 Duquesne was elected as a member of the Belgian Chamber of Representatives, re-elected in 1995 and 1999, and concurrently for a time served as a member of the Walloon Regional Council and the French Community Council (1991–1995). During this time he served as Quaestor (1995), chairman of the Committee on Justice (1996–1999) and the Committee on Foreign Relations (1999) and vice-president of the Chamber of Representatives and chairman of the PRL-FDF parliamentary intergroup.

In the Verhofstadt I Government Antoine Duquesne served as the Federal minister of the interior (1999–2003). In 2003–2004 Duquesne served as President of the MR. In 2003 Duquesne was elected to the Senate once more, served as Chairman of the Senate's Committee on Agriculture and Small Businesses, but he resigned in 2004 upon election to the European Parliament, in which he served 2004–2009. He sat on the European Parliament's Committee on Civil Liberties, Justice and Home Affairs and was a substitute for the Committee on Constitutional Affairs, a vice-chair of the Delegation for relations with Mercosur and a substitute for the delegation to the EU-Bulgaria Joint Parliamentary Committee.

In 2006 Duquesne had a cerebral infarction which left him paralysed and unable to speak and which prevented him to fulfill his office of member of the European parliament for the remainder of his term or even to resign his mandate, as that formally required his signature, which he no longer was able to give.

== Honours ==
- 1998 : Minister of State.
- 1999 : Grand Officer of the Order of Leopold.
- 2002 : Grand Officer of the Order of Orange-Nassau.
- 2009 : Knight Grand Cross in the Order of Leopold II.
