= Arrondissement of Brussels-Capital =

Arrondissement of Brussels-Capital: Arrondissement de Bruxelles-Capitale (French); Arrondissement Brussel-Hoofdstad (Dutch)
- Administrative Arrondissement
- Location of the arrondissement in Belgium
- Coordinates: 50.85°N 4.35°E
- Country: Belgium
- Region: Brussels Capital Region
- Province: none (extraprovincial)
- Municipalities: 19

Area
  - Total: 161.38 km^{2} (62.31 sq mi)

Population (2024)
  - Total: 1,249,597
  - Density: 7,743.2/km^{2} (20,055/sq mi)
- Time zone: UTC+1 (CET)
  - Summer (DST): UTC+2 (CEST)

The Arrondissement of Brussels-Capital (French: Arrondissement de Bruxelles-Capitale; Dutch: Arrondissement Brussel-Hoofdstad) is the only administrative arrondissement in the Brussels-Capital Region of Belgium. Because it is the only administrative arrondissement in the Brussels Region, its territory coincides with that of the latter.

The arrondissement was created in 1963 upon the splitting of the arrondissement of Brussels into the capital one and the surrounding arrondissement of Halle-Vilvoorde. They remained part of the Province of Brabant until it was split as well in 1995. In that year, the arrondissement of Nivelles formed the new Walloon Brabant and the arrondissements of Halle-Vilvoorde and Leuven formed the new Flemish Brabant. The arrondissement of Brussels-Capital, corresponding to the Brussels-Capital Region, thus became extraprovincial, meaning it is not a province, neither does it belong to one, nor does it contain any. However, it was the only Belgian arrondissement that was headed by a governor and a vice-governor until 2014 when these posts were abolished in accord with the 2011 state reform.

The Brussels-Capital Region is divided into 19 municipalities, of which the City of Brussels is the largest and most populous. See the list of municipalities of the Brussels-Capital Region.

== Governor and vice-governor ==
The governor exercised most of the few remaining powers elsewhere exercised by a provincial governor, particularly in the field of public order, as far as no (federal) law, (regional) decree, ordonnance or decision states otherwise. The governor was appointed by the government of the Brussels-Capital Region on the unanimous advice of the Federal Council of Ministers. The regional government also appointed the vice-governor, who was required to have a considerable knowledge of both French and Dutch and who had a duty to ensure that the legislation regarding the use of languages was observed in the Brussels region.

== Demographics ==
Historical population

Year	Pop.	±%
1831	140,322	—
1846	211,634	+50.8%
1856	260,754	+23.2%
1866	309,321	+18.6%
1880	436,710	+41.2%
1890	520,163	+19.1%

Year	Pop.	±%
1900	626,075	+20.4%
1910	761,898	+21.7%
1920	806,451	+5.8%
1930	892,183	+10.6%
1947	955,929	+7.1%
1961	1,022,795	+7.0%

Year	Pop.	±%
1970	1,075,136	+5.1%
1981	997,293	−7.2%
1991	954,045	−4.3%
2001	964,405	+1.1%
2011	1,119,088	+16.0%
2021	1,219,970	+9.0%

== See also ==
- Brussels Capital Region
