= Ariane de Lobkowicz-d'Ursel =

Belgian politician (born 1996)

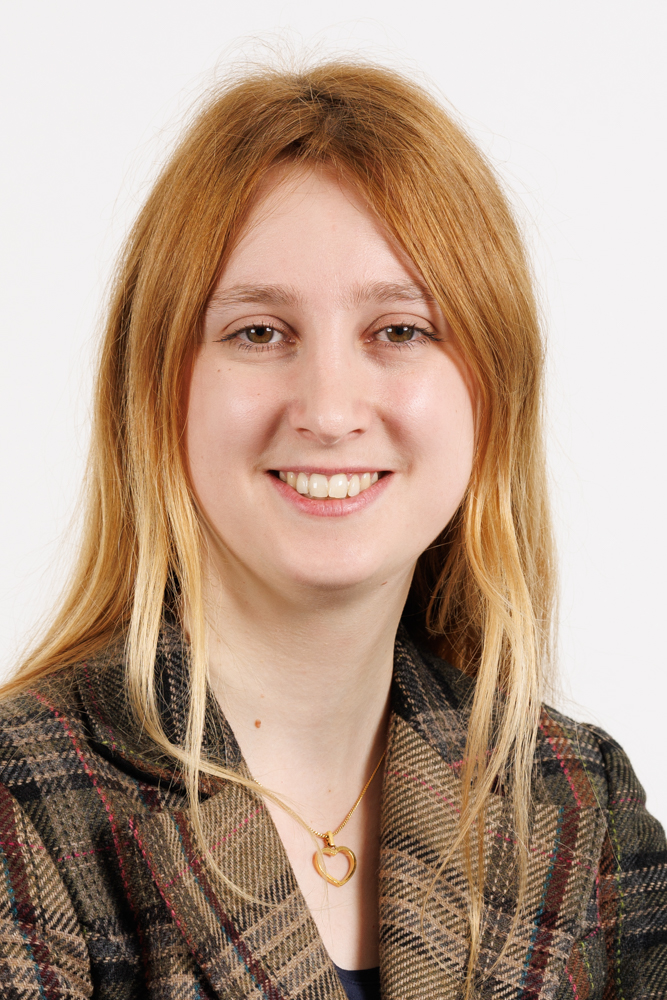
- Ariane de Lobkowicz d'Ursel

Member of the Brussels Parliament for the French Community Commission
- Incumbent
- Assumed office 2019

Personal details
- Born: 30 January 1996 (age 30) Uccle, Belgium
- Party: DéFI
- Parent(s): Stéphane de Lobkowicz and Barbara d'Ursel de Lobkowicz

Ariane Thérèse Nathalie Colienne Ludovic Marie Princess de Lobkowicz-d'Ursel (born 30 January 1996) is a Belgian politician who was elected to the Brussels Parliament.

== Biography ==
A member of the Lobkowicz noble family, she is the daughter of Stéphane de Lobkowicz and Barbara d'Ursel de Lobkowicz, both members of the Brussels Parliament. After being graduated in computer graphics from the ESA Saint-Luc in Brussels, she continued her education at the Haute École Albert Jacquard in Namur. She is currently studying law in evening classes at the University Saint-Louis Bruxelles, which she started after her election to the Brussels Parliament. Ariane officially bears, by royal decree, the title of Princess in Belgium.

In 2019, she was the youngest deputy elected to the Brussels Parliament. In her campaign she indicated that, like her mother, she also wanted to be committed to animal welfare.

== Political Functions ==
- Member of Parliament of the Brussels-Capital Region as of June 2019.
- Author or co-author of the proposal amending the law of August 14, 1986 on the protection and welfare of animals.(prohibition of ritual slaughter), of the proposal amending the same law to set conditions for the marketing of foie gras, of the proposal to prohibit the keeping of cetaceans.
- Author of the "Letter to Holy Holiness Pope Francis about our cousins, the animals".

== See also ==
- List of members of the Parliament of the Brussels-Capital Region, 2024–2029
