= Eléonore Simonet =

Belgian politician (born 1997)

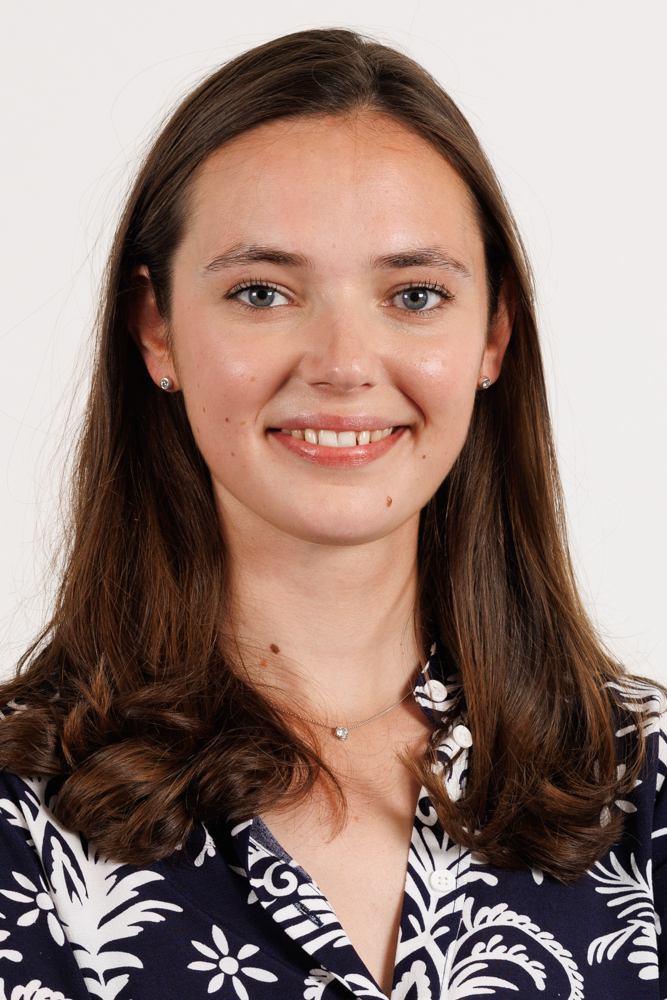
- Simonet in 2024

Minister of the Middle class, Self-Employed and SMEs
- Incumbent
- Assumed office 3 February 2025
- Prime Minister: Bart De Wever
- Preceded by: David Clarinval

Member of the Parliament of the Brussels-Capital Region
- In office 25 June 2024 – 3 February 2025

Personal details
- Born: 26 November 1997 (age 28) Liège, Belgium
- Party: Reformist Movement
- Parent: Jacques Simonet (father)
- Relatives: Henri Simonet (grandfather)
- Education: Saint-Louis University, Brussels; UCLouvain
- Occupation: Lawyer • Politician

Eléonore Simonet (born 26 November 1997) is a Belgian politician serving as minister of the middle class, self-employed and SMEs since 2025. She has been a member of the Parliament of the Brussels-Capital Region since 2024. She is the daughter of Jacques Simonet and the granddaughter of Henri Simonet.
