= Guido Brunner =

German diplomat and politician (1930–1997)

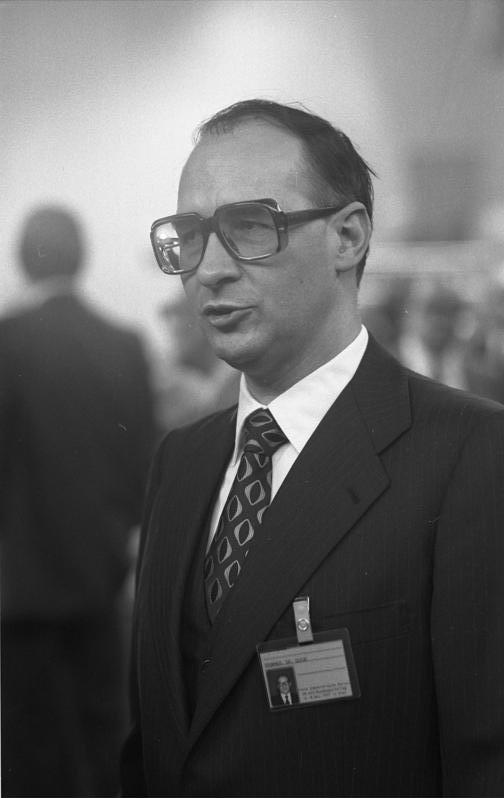
- Brunner in 1977

Member of the German Bundestag
- In office 5 October 1980 – 26 January 1981

European Commissioner for Energy, Research and Science
- In office 1977–1981
- President: Roy Jenkins
- Preceded by: Henri François Simonet
- Succeeded by: Étienne Davignon (as Commissioner for Energy): Filippo Maria Pandolfi (as Commissioner for Research and Science)

Personal details
- Born: 27 May 1930 Madrid, Spain
- Died: 2 December 1997 (aged 67)
- Party: Free Democratic Party

Guido Brunner (27 May 1930 – 2 December 1997) was a German diplomat and politician of the liberal Free Democratic Party. He served as European Commissioner for Energy, Research and Science in the Jenkins Commission from 1977 to 1981. He was a Member of the Bundestag from 1980 to 1981, Senator for the Economy in the government of West Berlin in 1981 and Ambassador to Spain from 1981 to 1992. Tam Dalyell described him as "one of the unsung architects of the Europe we have today."

== Career ==
Brunner was born and grew up in Madrid, where his father was a businessman. He moved to West Germany after the Second World War, where he studied law. He subsequently earned a PhD in law in Germany and a licentiate's degree in law in Spain.

=== Early diplomatic career ===
In 1955 he joined the West German diplomatic service and was posted to New York City as a member of the German delegation to the United Nations from 1960 to 1968. He was director of the press office of the Foreign Office from 1970 to 1972 and director of planning from 1972 to 1974. He headed the West German delegation to the 1973 Conference on Security and Co-operation in Europe.

=== European Commissioner ===
He served as European Commissioner for Energy, Research and Science in the Jenkins Commission from 1977 to 1981. Tam Dalyell described him as "one of the unsung architects of the Europe we have today," and in particular noted his goodwill towards the United Kingdom.

=== Career in German politics ===
Brunner was a member of the Bundestag from 1980 to 1981. In 1981 he served as Senator for the Economy and Deputy Mayor in the government of West Berlin.

=== Ambassador to Spain ===
Brunner left German politics to become Ambassador to his country of birth, Spain, in 1981, and served until his retirement in 1992.

== Family ==
Brunner was married to Christa née Speidel, the daughter of General Hans Speidel, the Supreme Commander of the NATO ground forces in Central Europe from 1957 to 1963.

Political offices
Preceded by Ralf Dahrendorf	German European Commissioner; 1977–1981	Succeeded by Karl-Heinz Narjes
Preceded by Ralf Dahrendorf (Research, Science and Education) and Henri Simonet (Taxation and Energy)	European Commissioner for Energy, Research and Science; 1977–1981	Succeeded by Filippo Maria Pandolfi (Research and Development) and Étienne Davignon (Industrial Affairs and Energy)
