= Barbara d'Ursel de Lobkowicz =

Belgian politician and lawyer

Member of the Brussels Parliament for the French Community Commission
- In office 2014–2017

Personal details
- Born: 30 May 1957 Ath, Belgium
- Died: 13 July 2017 (aged 60) Uccle, Belgium
- Party: DéFI
- Spouse: Stéphane de Lobkowicz
- Children: Ariane de Lobkowicz-d'Ursel (daughter)

Princess Barbara d'Ursel de Lobkowicz (30 May 1957 - 13 June 2017) was a Belgian politician who served in the Brussels Parliament.

== Biography ==
A member of the Ursel family, she was a corporate lawyer at the Brussels Bar. She married Stéphane de Lobkowicz also a member of the Brussels Parliament.

A member of DéFI, she was elected to the Brussels Parliament in 2014 and served until her death. As a member of parliament, she was primarily concerned with animal welfare.

Her daughter Ariane de Lobkowicz-d'Ursel was elected to the Brussels Parliament in 2019; in the latter's campaign she indicated that, like her mother, she too was committed to animal welfare.
