= Boris Dilliès =

Belgian politician (born 1972)

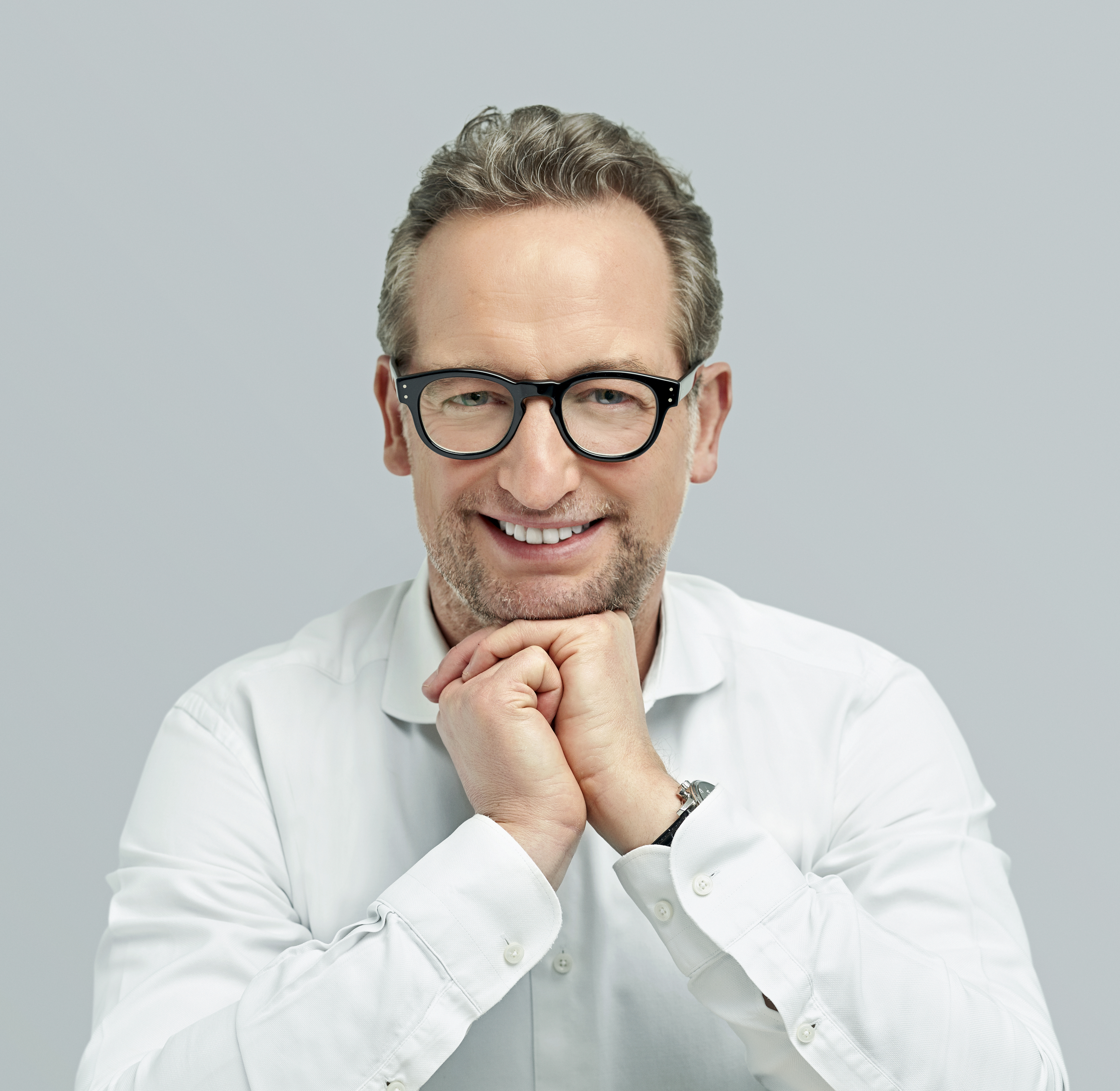
- Dilliès in 2019

Minister-President of the Brussels-Capital Region
- Incumbent
- Assumed office 14 February 2026
- Preceded by: Rudi Vervoort

Personal details
- Born: 26 December 1972 (age 53)
- Party: Reformist Movement

Boris Dilliès (French: [bɔʁis diljɛs]; born 26 December 1972) is a Belgian politician serving as minister-president of the Brussels-Capital Region since 2026. He has served as mayor of Uccle since 2017. From 2014 to 2018, he was a member of the Parliament of the Brussels-Capital Region.

== Biography ==
=== Early Years, education and private life ===
Born on December 26, 1972, in Uccle, Boris Dilliès spent his childhood in the South of France (Vence). French on his father's side, he retains dual nationality. Around the age of ten, he returned to Uccle. His maternal grandfather, a close collaborator of Kings Leopold III and Baudouin, played a key role in his political engagement.

Dilliès holds a degree in public relations from the École de promotion et de formation continue (EPFC) and is a lecturer at the European Communication School in Uccle.

He is married and has one daughter.

=== Early Political Career ===
At fifteen, Dilliès became active in the Young Liberal Reformers (Jeunes Réformateurs Libéraux, JRL), later becoming its president.

From 1994 to 2000, he chaired the local JRL branch in Uccle, and then, from 1995 to 1998, the regional branch for the Brussels-Capital Region. He campaigned in Uccle during the October 1988 municipal elections, alongside his political mentor, Éric André. In October 1994, he ran for office for the first time, but missed being elected by five votes. In 1997, he was elected to the Uccle municipal council, where he became a member of the Public Social Welfare Centre (CPAS). He then chaired the parliamentary group on the municipal council from 2003 to 2005. From 2001 to 2007, Dilliès directed the municipality's cultural center.

Following the death of Éric André in September 2005, Dilliès was elected alderman of Uccle, responsible for finance and religious affairs.

During the 2006-2012 term, Dilliès retained his position as alderman for finance, also responsible for the economy, SMEs, youth, sports, extracurricular activities, green spaces, and urban planning.

Concurrently, Dilliès served in the office of Éric André, then Secretary of State for the Government of the Brussels-Capital Region, from 1995 to 2000. He then held the same position from 2000 to 2003 under the Minister-President of Brussels, François-Xavier de Donnea. From 2002 to 2007, he worked at Wolters Kluwer Publishing, where he was responsible for project development, and from 2010 to 2012, he was the communications director for the Cercle de Lorraine. Since 2011, he has also taught media institutions and sociology at the European Communication School in Uccle.

Following the 2012 municipal elections, Boris Dilliès continued to serve as alderman of Uccle, responsible for finance, the economy and commerce, and youth, and as a civil registrar, under the authority of Mayor Armand De Decker.

Since January 2013, Dilliès has also been vice-president of the MR federation for the Brussels-Capital Region.

In the May 2014 elections, Dilliès was elected to the Parliament of the Brussels-Capital Region with a large number of preferential votes. He chaired the infrastructure committee there from 2014 to 2017.

=== Mayor of Uccle ===
Since 2016, Dilliès has chaired the local branch of the Reformist Movement (MR) in Uccle. In 2017, he was re-elected vice-president of the Brussels MR and succeeded Armand De Decker as mayor of Uccle, a position he retained after the 2018 and 2024 elections.

After his election as mayor of Uccle, he resigned from his position as regional deputy at the end of January 2018. In January 2018, the Uccle MR branch nominated him to lead and compile the list for the municipal elections of October of the same year, after which he remained one of the two MR mayors in the Brussels-Capital Region. He was sworn in on November 26, 2018.

In the May 2019 regional elections, he was last on the MR list. He was elected to the Brussels Parliament. The election of Aurélie Czekalski allowed Uccle to gain a liberal representative, and Boris Dilliès decided not to take his seat in the regional parliament in order to remain mayor full-time.

=== Minister-President of the Brussels-Capital Region ===
In 2026, after an exceptionally long government formation process lasting over 600 days, he was appointed Minister-President of the Brussels-Capital Region by Georges-Louis Bouchez, president of the MR.
