= Manon Vidal =

Belgian politician (born 1999)

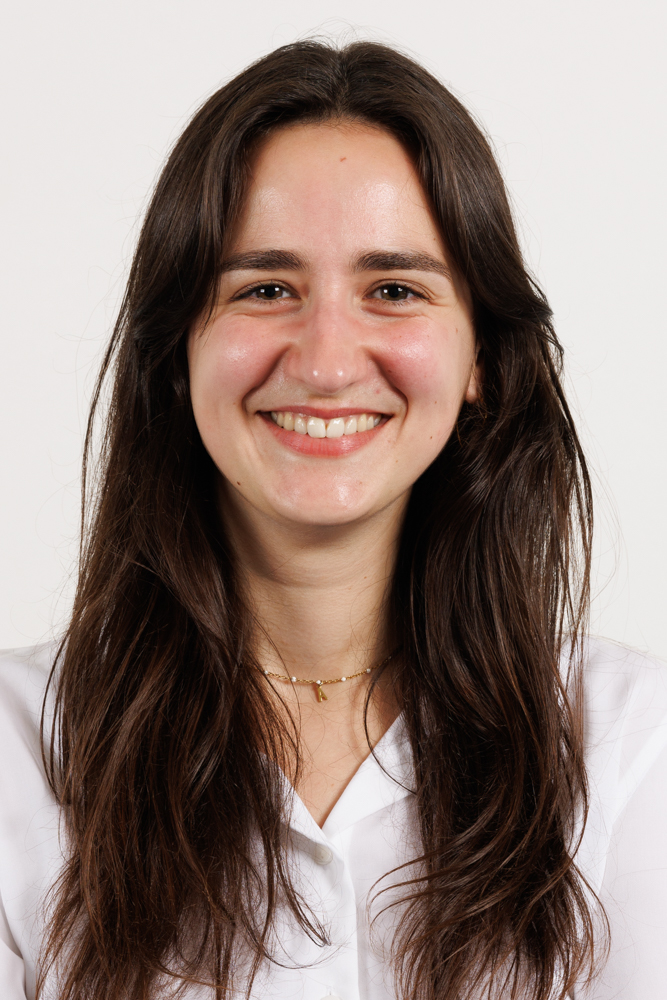

Member of the Parliament of the Brussels-Capital Region
- Incumbent
- Assumed office 9 June 2024

Personal details
- Born: 22 July 1999 (age 27) Toulouse, France
- Party: Workers' Party of Belgium
- Education: Université libre de Bruxelles

Manon Vidal (born 22 July 1999) is a Belgian politician and a member of the Workers' Party of Belgium (PTB). She was elected to the Parliament of the Brussels-Capital Region in the 2024 election and serves as chair of the PTB group in the Brussels Francophone Parliament.

== Early life and career ==
Vidal was born in Toulouse, France. She studied sociology at the Université libre de Bruxelles. Prior to her election, she worked as a parliamentary assistant.

== Political career ==
Vidal was elected to the Brussels parliament in the 2024 Belgian regional elections, becoming one of the youngest elected representatives in the country. She is a member of the parliamentary advisory committee on gender equality.
