= Daniel Ducarme =

Belgian politician (1954–2010)

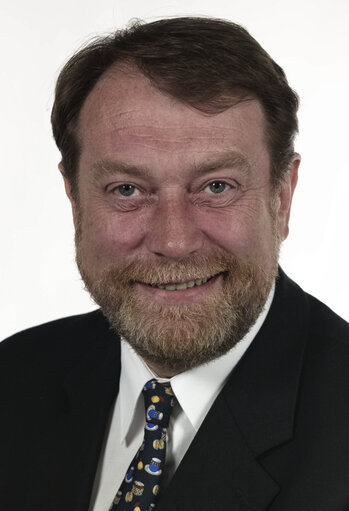

Minister-President of Brussels
- In office 6 June 2003 – 18 February 2004
- Preceded by: François-Xavier de Donnea
- Succeeded by: Jacques Simonet

Personal details
- Born: 8 March 1954; Liège, Belgium
- Died: 28 August 2010 (aged 56); Brussels, Belgium
- Political party: Reformist Movement

Daniel Ducarme (French pronunciation: [danjɛl dykaʁm]; 8 March 1954, Liège – 28 August 2010) was a Belgian politician and former Minister-President of the Brussels-Capital Region.

== Background and political affiliation ==
Starting his political career in the Liberal Reformist Party (PRL), Ducarme served as mayor of Thuin in Wallonia from 1988 to 2000, becoming party president in 1999. In 2000 he moved to Schaerbeek in the Brussels-Capital Region and stood for election to the Schaerbeek council.

The PRL merged with its centre-right partners to create the Reformist Movement (MR) in 2002, which Ducarme led as president.

Ducarme has voiced his support for Rattachism.

== Brussels Minister-President ==
In 2003 he replaced his MR colleague François-Xavier de Donnéa as Minister-President of the Brussels-Capital Region, provoking considerable resentment among parties representing the Flemish-speaking community as he was essentially a monoglot Francophone, unlike his predecessors as Minister-President.

=== Resignation and succession ===
Ducarme resigned in 2004 following allegations of improprieties by the newspaper L'Avenir concerning his tax affairs. He claimed his fiscal status was fine and that he had been "shot in the back" by a member of his own party. He was succeeded as Minister-President by Jacques Simonet and as president of the MR by Didier Reynders.

== Later career ==
In 2006, Ducarme proposed to return to politics, wishing to stand in Schaerbeek on the MR list in the October 2006 elections, but the MR did not follow suit and excluded him from its list. In apparent compensation he was appointed by Reynders to represent the MR as a roving ambassador abroad. Ducarme died of cancer on 28 August 2010.

== Notes ==
Political offices
Preceded by François-Xavier de Donnea	Minister-President of Brussels; 2003–2004	Succeeded by Jacques Simonet
