= Alain Maron =

Belgian politician (born 1972)

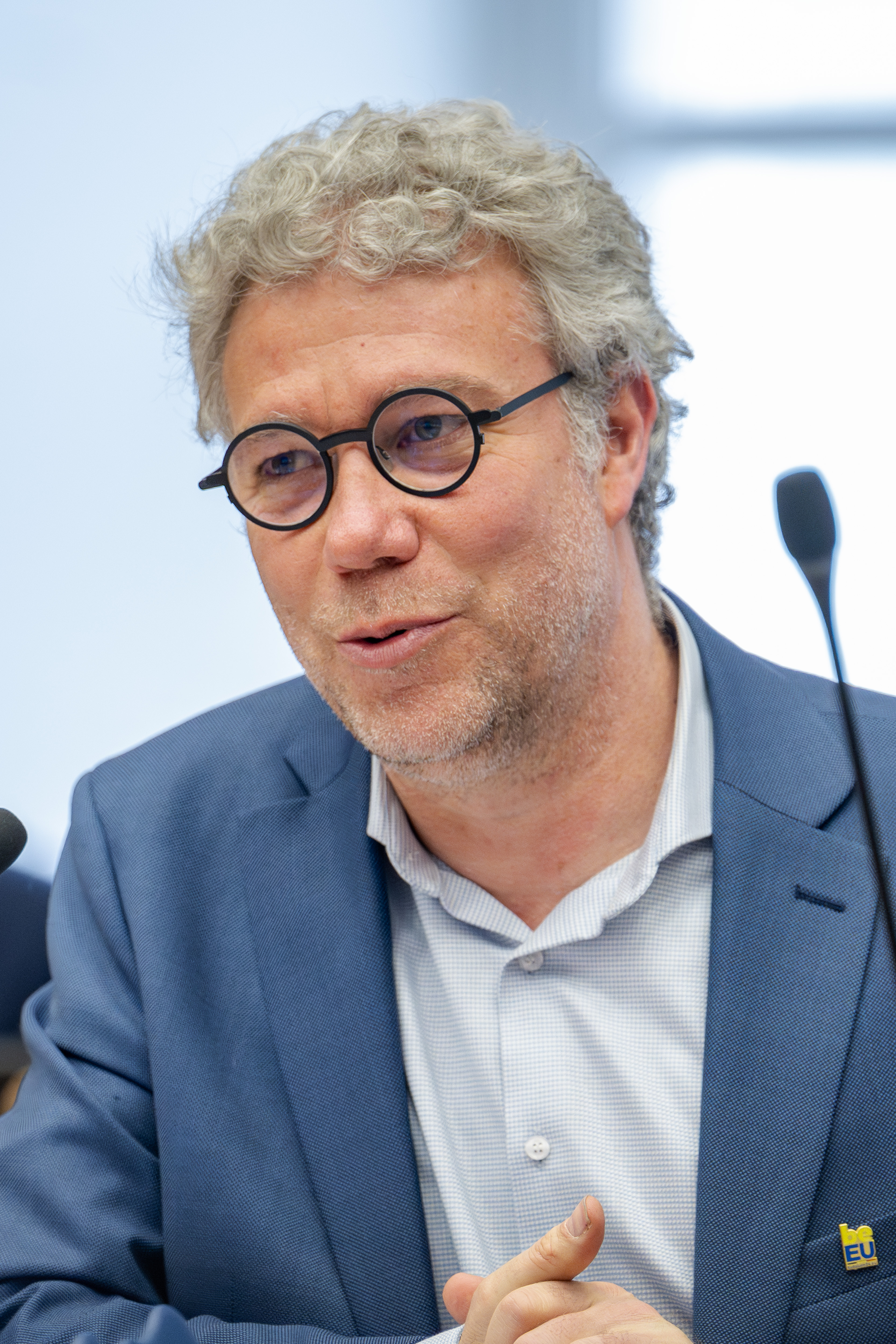
Maron in March 2024

Alain Maron (born 6 May 1972) is a politician from Belgium. Since 2019, he has been a minister for the cabinet of the Brussels-Capital Region.

Maron holds the cabinet roles of Minister of Environment & Climate, Social Integration, Health, Energy, Water, Cleanliness and the Port of Brussels. He is a member of the Ecolo party.
