= Liberal Reformist Party (Belgium) =

Liberal Reformist Party Parti Réformateur Libéral
- Founded: 1971
- Dissolved: 2002
- Split from: Party for Freedom and Progress
- Merged into: Reformist Movement
- Ideology: Liberalism
- Political position: Centre-right
- European affiliation: European Liberal Democrat and Reform Party
- European Parliament group: ELDR Group
- International affiliation: Liberal International

The Liberal Reformist Party (French: Parti Réformateur Libéral, pronounced [paʁti ʁefɔʁmatœʁ libeʁal], PRL) was a liberal political party active in Wallonia and Brussels in Belgium. The PRL grew out of the Francophone part of the unitary liberal Party for Freedom and Progress (PVV-PLP) in 1971 and merged into the Reformist Movement (RM) in 2002.

== History ==
In 1971, the Party for Freedom and Progress (PVV-PLP), inheritor to the historical Liberal Party of Belgium, split into a Flemish and a Francophone party, anticipating the political devolution bill of 1980. Initially keeping the French version of the old party name (Parti de la liberté et du progrès), the party relaunched as the Party of Reforms and Freedom of Wallonia (Parti des réformes et de la liberté de Wallonie, PRLW) after taking over the Walloon Rally. In Brussels, the French-speaking Liberals co-operated intensively with the Democratic Front of the Francophones (FDF). In 1979, the Francophone liberals of the capital merged into the PRLW, which took the new name of Liberal Reformist Party (PRL).

The Walloon liberals participated in the federal government from 1973 to 1977 (Leburton governments I-II, Tindemans governments I-III), in 1980 (Martens government III), from 1981 to 1988 (Martens governments V-VII), and from 1999 to 2003 (Verhofstadt I Government).

In 1993, the PRL formed an alliance with the Democratic Front of the Francophones (FDF), a party standing up for the rights of French-speakers in and around Brussels. In 1998, the Citizens' Movement for Change, a split-off from the Christian Social Party, joined the alliance, making it the PRL-FDF-MCC Federation. On a congress in 2002, the German-speaking liberals of the Party for Freedom and Progress also joined and the alliance took the name of Reformist Movement (MR). After this congress, the PRL completely merged in the MR.

== Presidents ==
- 1972–1973: Milou Jeunehomme
- 1973–1979: André Damseaux
- 1979–1982: Jean Gol
- 1982–1990: Louis Michel
- 1990–1992: Antoine Duquesne and Daniel Ducarme (co-presidency)
- 1992–1995: Jean Gol
- 1995–1999: Louis Michel
- 1999–2003: Daniel Ducarme

== Notable members ==
- André Damseaux, party chairman 1973-1974, MEP, Prime Minister of the Walloon Region, 1982
- Jean Defraigne, President of the Belgian Chamber of Representatives 1980, 1981-1988
- François-Xavier de Donnea, Defence Minister and Minister for the Brussels Region 1984-1988, Mayor of Brussels 1995-2000, Prime Minister of the Brussels Region 2000-2003
- Antoine Duquesne, party chairman 1990-1992, Education Minister 1987-1988, Interior Minister of Belgium 1999-2003, MEP 2004-2009
- Jean Gol, party chairman 1979-1981, Vice-Premier and Justice Minister of Belgium 1981-1988
- Louis Michel, party chairman 1982-1990, 1995-1999, Foreign Minister 1999-2004, European Commissioner 2004-2009
- Charles Poswick, Defence Minister 1966-1968, 1980, President of the Parliament of the French Community 1984-1985
- Didier Reynders, chairman of the National Railway Company of Belgium 1986-1991, Finance Minister of Belgium 1999-2004
- Jacques Simonet, Prime Minister of the Brussels Region 1999-2000, 2004
- Pierre Van Halteren, Mayor of Brussels 1975-1982

== See also ==
- Liberalism in Belgium
