= Charles Picqué =

Belgian politician (born 1948)

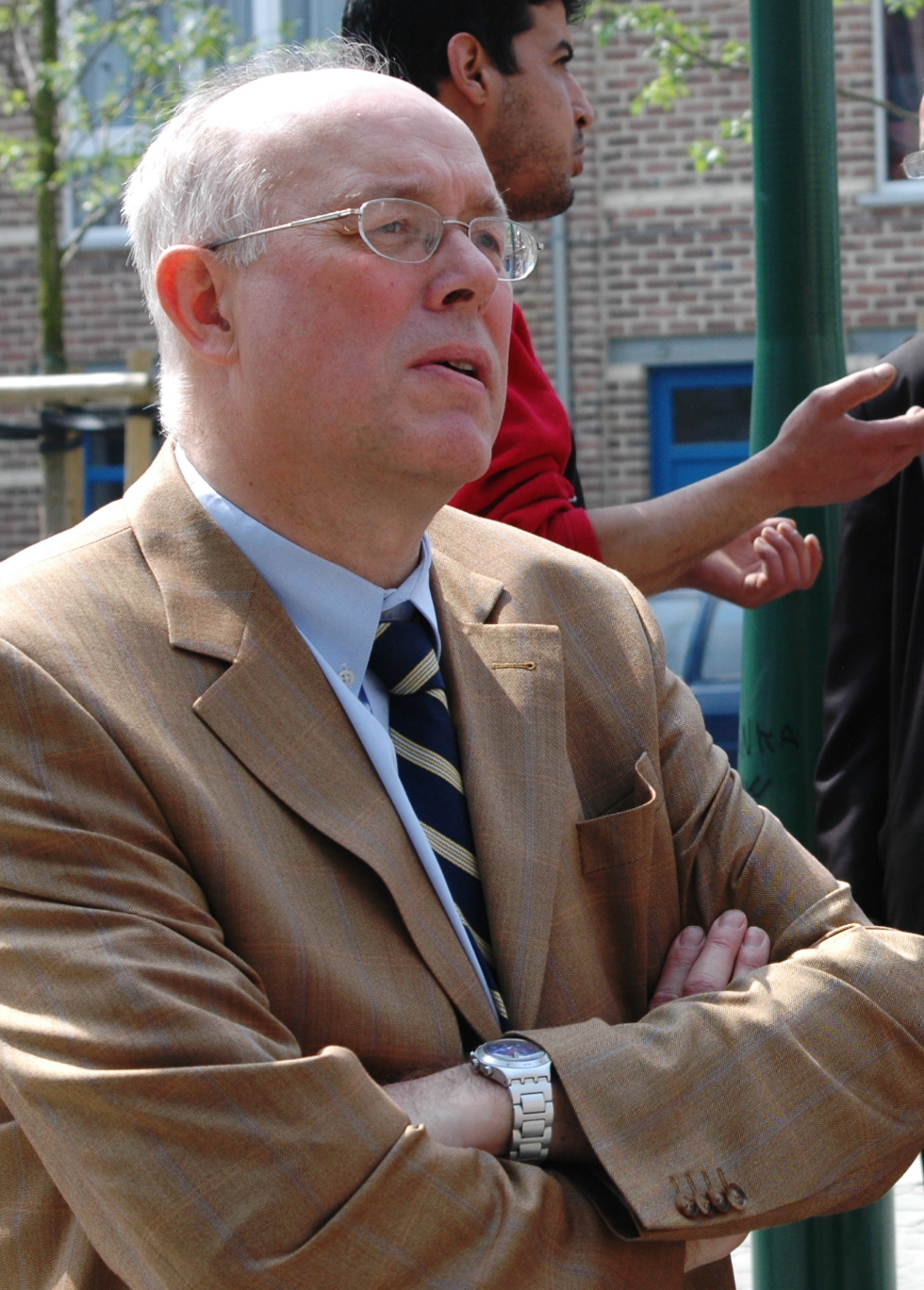

Speaker of the Parliament of the Brussels-Capital Region
- In office 10 June 2014 – 2019
- Preceded by: Éric Tomas
- Succeeded by: Rachid Madrane

Minister-President of Brussels
- In office 19 July 2004 – 7 May 2013
- Preceded by: Jacques Simonet
- Succeeded by: Rudi Vervoort
- In office 12 July 1989 – 15 July 1999
- Preceded by: Position established
- Succeeded by: Jacques Simonet

Personal details
- Born: 1 November 1948 (age 77) Etterbeek, Belgium
- Party: Socialist Party
- Education: Catholic University of Louvain
- Website: Official website

Charles Picqué (French pronunciation: [ʃaʁl pike]; born 1 November 1948) is a Belgian politician. He is a former Minister-President of the Brussels Capital-Region.

After obtaining a master's degree in economics at the Institut d'administration et de gestion at the Louvain School of Management (University of Louvain), he made his first steps in politics in the Brussels municipality of Saint-Gilles, where he has been mayor since 1985.

Deeply concerned by urban issues in general and Brussels urban issues in particular, he has devoted a large part of his political activity to promoting and defending Brussels' role and rights as a full region – at par with the two other regions of Belgium – within the institutional framework of the Belgian state.

When the government of the Brussels-Capital Region was established in 1989, he became his first Minister-President with two mandates that lasted until 1999. In July 2004, he was reappointed to the same position.

In 1999, he was appointed Special Rapporteur for the Federal Government on Policies in support of Major Cities. During his mandate as Minister of the Economy and Scientific Research – from 2000 to 2003 – he maintained this responsibility, and played a key role in introducing measures to support Belgium's large cities in coping with the specific problems typical of major urban agglomerations.

During his leadership of the Brussels-Capital Region, he has pushed strongly for urban regeneration and social cohesiveness, with a strong emphasis on the areas of the Brussels Region which face the most serious problems.

In 2007, he launched another important project, an International Development Plan for Brussels, or IDP. The initiative involves the complete renewal of ten major sites within the city, and aims to strengthen the role of Brussels as the capital of Europe and as a major European city with a strong international vocation.

In negotiations on institutional reform, as of 2008, his main priority was to defend Brussels' status as a full region, to emphasize the fundamental importance of the Brussels economy for Belgium and for the other two regions, and to promote its natural role – as Belgium's only bilingual Region – in improving ties and cohesion between the country's French and Dutch-speaking communities.

Picqué stepped down as Minister-President of the Brussels-Capital Region on 7 May 2013, and was replaced by Rudi Vervoort.

== Political career ==
- 1983–1985: Member of the Saint-Gilles municipal Council, with responsibility for Town Planning
- 1985–: Mayor of Saint-Gilles
- 1985–1987: Member of the Provincial Council of Brabant
- 1988–1990: Member of Parliament, Chambre des députés
- 1988–89: Minister of the French-speaking Community, with responsibility for Social Affairs and Health
- 1989–95: Minister-President of the Brussels-Capital Region, with responsibility for Town Planning, Local Authorities, Employment and Urban Regeneration
- 1995–1999: Minister-President of the Brussels-Capital Region, with responsibility for Local Authorities, Employment, Monuments and Protected Buildings
- 1995–1999: Minister of the French-speaking Community, with responsibility for Cultural Affairs
- 1999–2000: Member of Parliament, Chambre des députés
- 1999–2000: Special Rapporteur for the Federal Government on Policies in support of Major Cities
- 2000–2003: Minister of the Economy and Scientific Research of the Federal Government, with responsibility for Policies in support of Major Cities
- May 2003: Member of Parliament, Chambre des députés
- July 2004-May 2013: Minister-President of the Brussels-Capital Region, with responsibility for Urban Planning, Local Authorities, Monuments and Protected Buildings, Urban Regeneration, Housing, Refuse Disposal and Resource Recovery, and Foreign Trade

Political offices
New office	Minister-President of Brussels; 1989–1999	Succeeded by Jacques Simonet
Preceded by Jacques Simonet	Minister-President of Brussels; 2004–2013	Succeeded by Rudi Vervoort
Preceded by Éric Tomas	Speaker of the Parliament of the Brussels-Capital Region; 2014–present	Incumbent
