= Minister-President of the Brussels-Capital Region =

Head of the government of the Brussels-Capital Region

- Regional flag

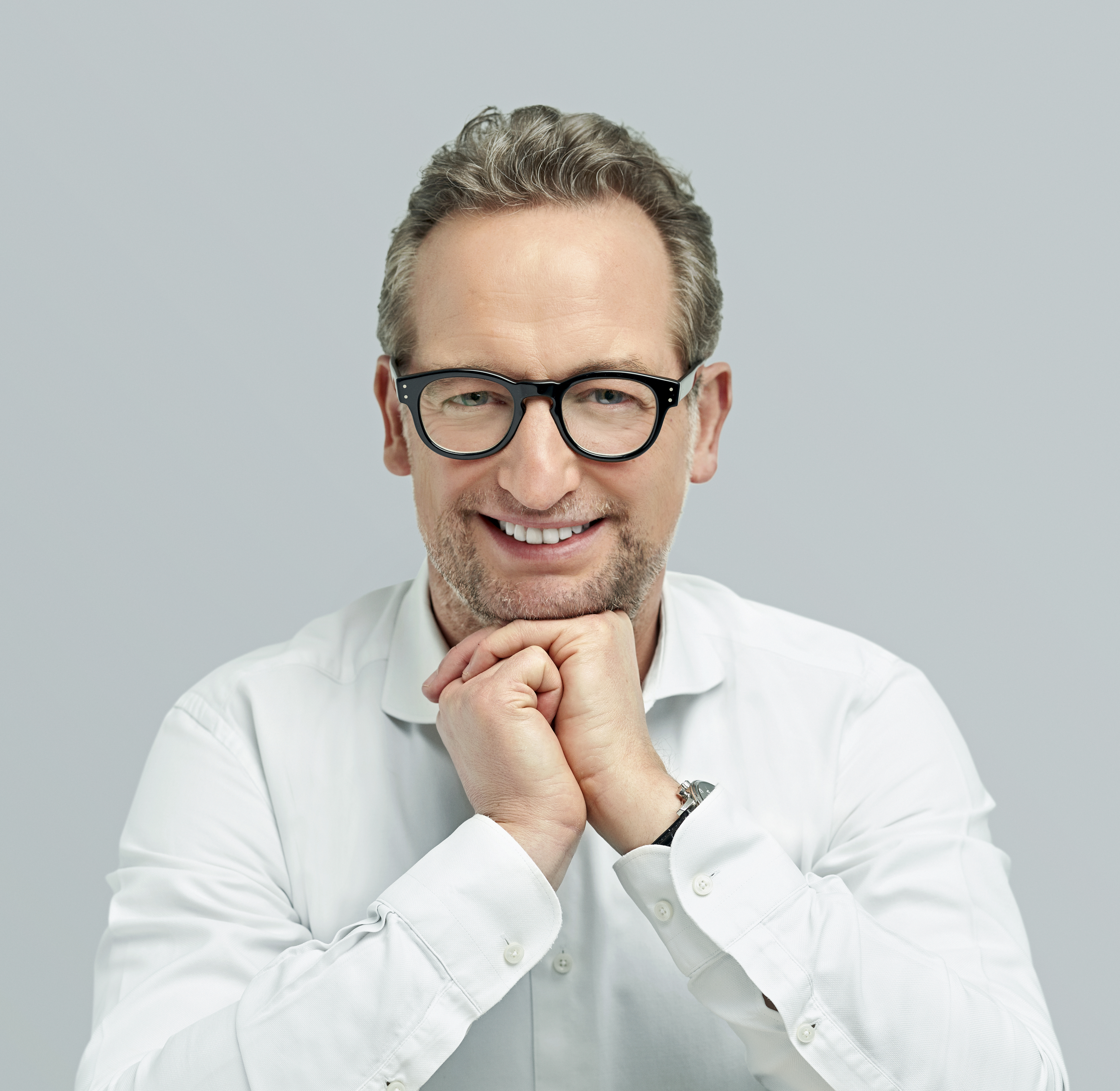
- Incumbent; Boris Dilliès since 14 February 2026
- Term length: Five years
- Inaugural holder: Charles Picqué
- Formation: 12 June 1989

The minister-president of the Brussels-Capital Region (French: Ministre-président de la région de Bruxelles-Capitale; Dutch: Minister-president van het Brussels Hoofdstedelijk Gewest) leads the government of the Brussels-Capital Region of Belgium. The post is appointed for five years along with four ministers and three state's secretaries. While being the leader of the Brussels government, the minister-president also is the president of the college of the Common Community Commission.

The minister-president of the Brussels-Capital Region should not be confused with either the governor of Brussels-Capital nor with the mayor of the City of Brussels, which is one of the 19 municipalities of Brussels.

The minister-president is not counted in the ratio of French-speaking to Dutch-speaking ministers. In practice, every minister-president has been a francophone, though bilingual.

== List of officeholders ==
No.	Portrait	Name (Born–Died)	Term of office			Party	Government	Coalition	
No.	Portrait	Name (Born–Died)	Term of office			Party	Government	Dutch-speaking	French-speaking
No.	Portrait	Name (Born–Died)	Took office	Left office	Time in office	Party	Government	Dutch-speaking	French-speaking
1		Charles Picqué (1948– )	12 July 1989	15 July 1999	10 years, 3 days	PS	Picqué I	CVP, SP, VU	PS, PSC, FDF
1		Charles Picqué (1948– )	12 July 1989	15 July 1999	10 years, 3 days	PS	Picqué II	CVP, SP, VU	PS, PRL-FDF
2		Jacques Simonet (1963–2007)	15 July 1999	18 October 2000	1 year, 94 days	PRL	Simonet I	CVP, VLD, SP	PRL-FDF, PS
3		François-Xavier de Donnea (1941– )	18 October 2000	6 June 2003	2 years, 232 days	PRL/MR	de Donnea	CVP, VLD, SP	PRL-FDF, PS
4		Daniel Ducarme (1954–2010)	6 June 2003	18 February 2004	257 days	MR	Ducarme	CD&V, VLD, SP	MR, PS
5		Jacques Simonet (1963–2007)	18 February 2004	19 July 2004	152 days	MR	Simonet II	CD&V, VLD, SP	MR, PS
6		Charles Picqué (1948– )	19 July 2004	7 May 2013	8 years, 291 days	PS	Picqué III	VLD, sp.a, CD&V	PS, cdH, Ecolo
6		Charles Picqué (1948– )	19 July 2004	7 May 2013	8 years, 291 days	PS	Picqué IV	Open VLD, CD&V, Groen	PS, cdH, Ecolo
7		Rudi Vervoort (1958– )	7 May 2013	14 February 2026	12 years, 283 days	PS	Vervoort I	Open VLD, CD&V, Groen	PS, Ecolo, cdH
7		Rudi Vervoort (1958– )	7 May 2013	14 February 2026	12 years, 283 days	PS	Vervoort II	Open VLD, sp.a, CD&V	PS, DéFI, cdH
7		Rudi Vervoort (1958– )	7 May 2013	14 February 2026	12 years, 283 days	PS	Vervoort III	Groen, Open VLD, sp.a	PS, Ecolo, DéFI
8		Boris Dilliès (1972– )	14 February 2026		229 days	MR	Dilliès	Groen, Anders, Vooruit, CD&V	MR, PS, LE

== See also ==
- Prime Minister of Belgium
- Minister-President of Flanders
- Minister-President of the French Community
- Minister-President of the German-speaking Community
- Minister-President of Wallonia
