= Rudi Vervoort =

Belgian politician (born 1958)

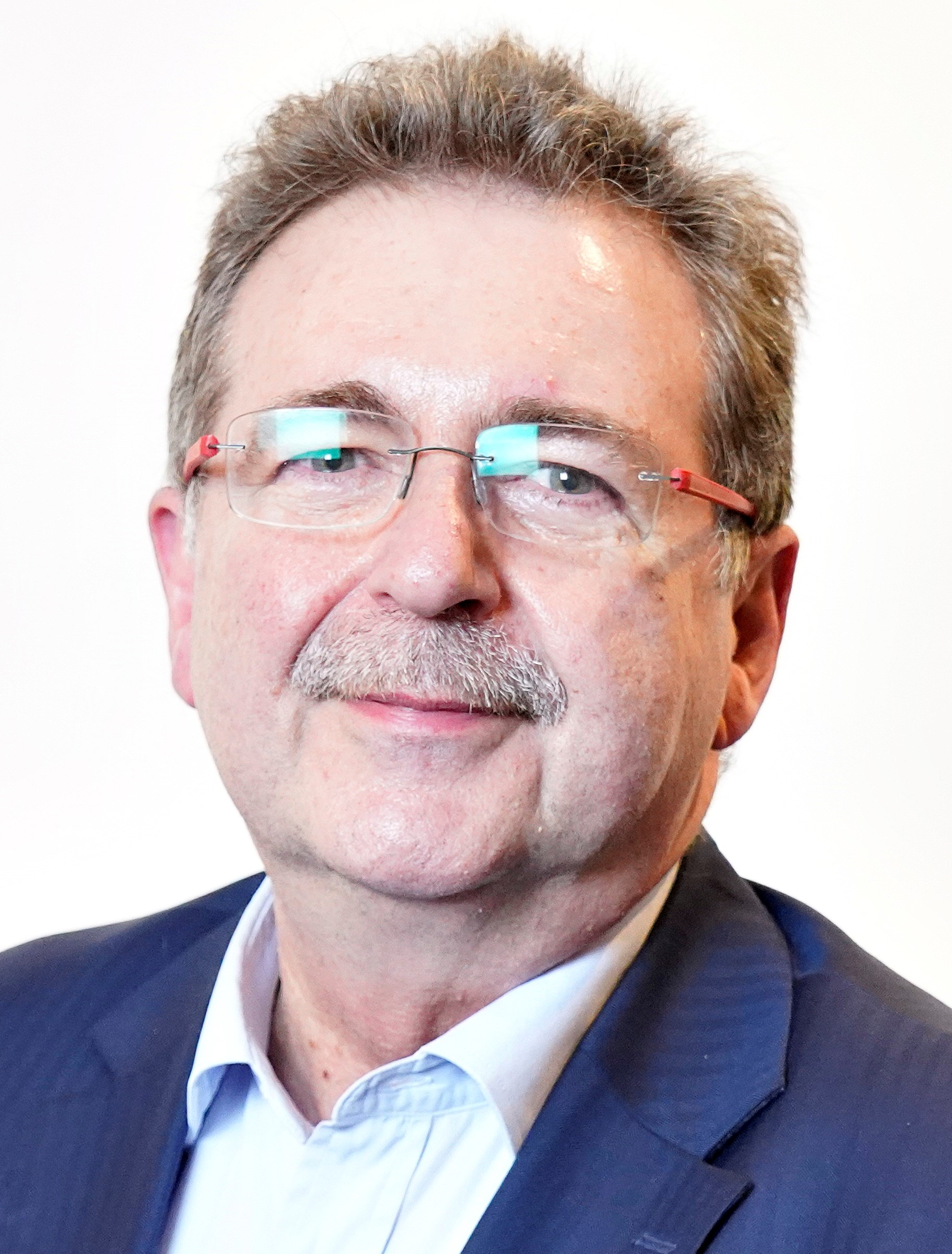

Minister-President of Brussels
- In office 7 May 2013 – 14 February 2026
- Preceded by: Charles Picqué
- Succeeded by: Boris Dilliès

Personal details
- Born: 20 November 1958 (age 67) Berchem-Sainte-Agathe, Belgium
- Party: Socialist Party
- Education: Université libre de Bruxelles

Rudi Vervoort (born 20 November 1958) is a Brussels politician. He has been the mayor of Evere since 1998 and member of the Brussels Parliament. He became the Minister-President of the Brussels-Capital Region on 7 May 2013 and is responsible for Local Authorities, Urban Development, Monuments and Sites, Environmental Maintenance (responsibility delegated to the Secretary of State Rachid Madrane), Development Cooperation and Regional Statistics.

He holds a degree in law.

== Honours ==
- 2014: Commander of the Order of Leopold II
- 2016: Cordon of the Order of the Rising Sun

Political offices
Preceded by Charles Picqué	Minister-President of Brussels; 2013–present	Incumbent
