= Jacques Simonet =

Belgian politician (1963–2007)

Minister-President of Brussels
- In office 18 February 2004 – 19 July 2004
- Preceded by: Daniel Ducarme
- Succeeded by: Charles Picqué
- In office 15 July 1999 – 18 October 2000
- Preceded by: Charles Picqué
- Succeeded by: François-Xavier de Donnea

Personal details
- Born: 21 December 1963 Watermael-Boitsfort, Belgium
- Died: 14 June 2007 (aged 43) Anderlecht, Belgium
- Party: Reformist Movement
- Children: Eléonore Simonet
- Education: Université libre de Bruxelles
- Website: Official website

Jacques Simonet (French pronunciation: [ʒak simɔnɛ]; 21 December 1963 – 14 June 2007) was a Belgian politician and a former Minister-President of the Brussels-Capital Region.

== Life ==
He is the son of Henri Simonet, former Socialist Party minister and for many years mayor of Anderlecht. His mother Marie-Louise Angenet taught at the Vrije Universiteit Brussel.

He was born in Watermael-Boitsfort, Belgium. He studied law at the Université libre de Bruxelles. He married Véronica Labe, a notary, in 1988; they had two children. He entered politics as a student activist in the Fédération des étudiants libéraux, a right-wing party and later became a member of the Reformist Movement (MR).

Simonet served as mayor of Anderlecht from 2000 until his death and as Minister-President of the Brussels-Capital Region from 15 July 1999 to 18 October 2000. He served as state secretary for European Affairs of Belgium from 12 July 2003 until 12 February 2004 when he became Minister-President of Brussels for the second time on the resignation of Daniel Ducarme following revelations of Ducarme's unpaid taxes in the newspaper L'Avenir. He led the MR list in the elections of June 2004, losing to the Socialists led by former Minister-President Charles Picqué and gave up the minister-presidency a month later.

Simonet was hospitalised on 9 September 2006 as the result of a pulmonary embolism. In the elections which followed on 8 October 2006 he was re-elected as mayor of Anderlecht with 8500 preference votes. On 14 June 2007 he suddenly died of a heart attack aged only 43.

== Sources ==
- Website of Jacques Simonet
- Biographical note at the MR website
- Mayor Jacques Simonet passed away

Political offices
| Preceded by Charles Picqué | Minister-President of Brussels; 1999–2000 | Succeeded by François-Xavier de Donnea |
| Preceded by Daniel Ducarme | Minister-President of Brussels; 2004 | Succeeded by Charles Picqué |
