= Rachid Madrane =

Belgian politician

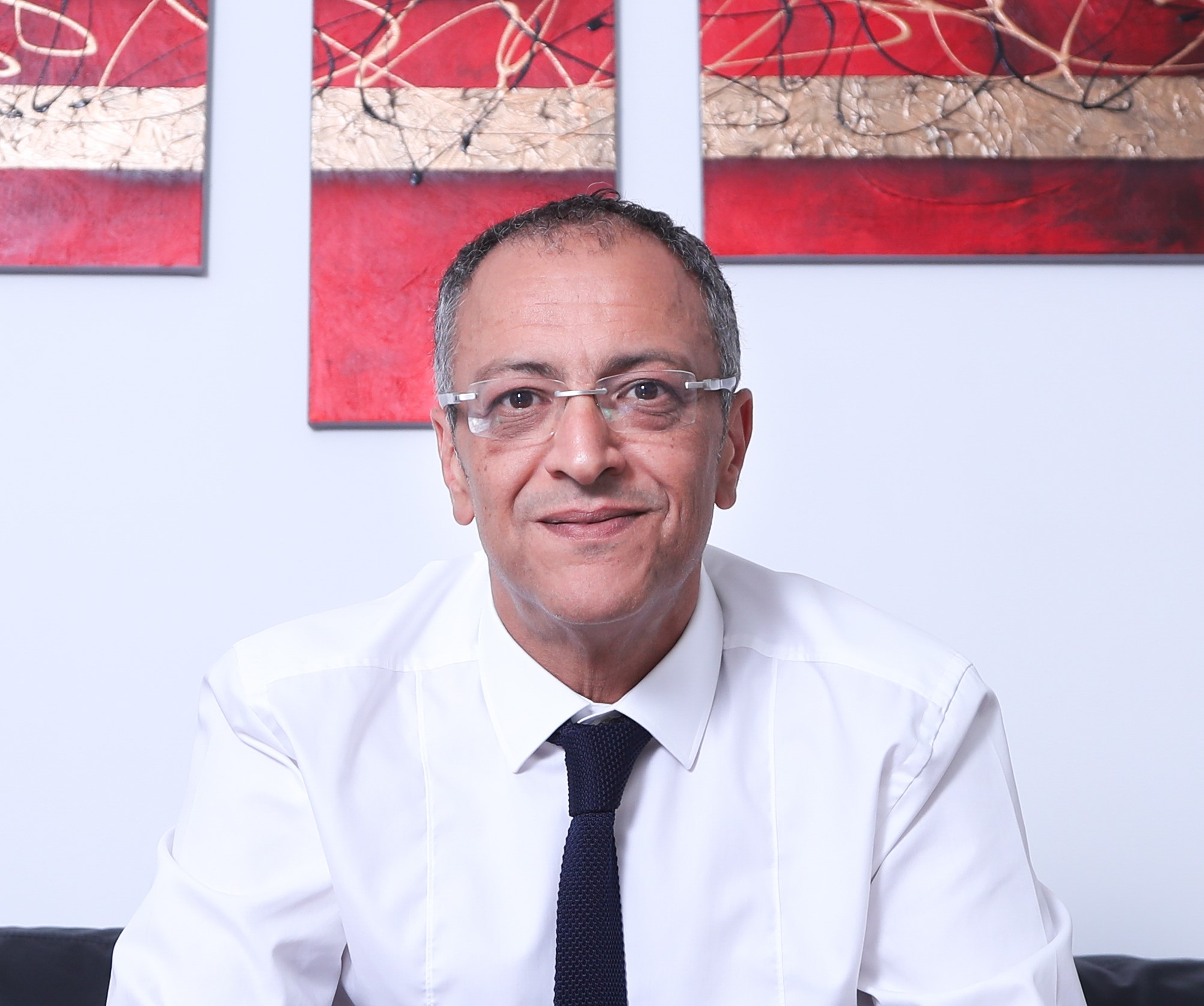

Speaker of the Parliament of the Brussels-Capital Region
- Incumbent
- Assumed office 18 July 2019
- Preceded by: Charles Picqué

Personal details
- Born: 15 April 1968 (age 58) Brussels, Belgium
- Party: Socialist Party
- Education: Free University of Brussels
- Website: Official website

Rachid Madrane (born 15 April 1968) is a Belgian politician and journalist of Moroccan descent. He is currently Speaker of the Parliament of the Brussels-Capital Region.

He first served as a member of the regional parliament from 2004 to 2009, before serving as a member of the federal Chamber of Representatives between 2010 and 2012, representing the electoral district of Brussels-Hal-Vilvoorde. The day after the 2019 elections, Madrane was appointed president of the Brussels regional parliament, where he was installed in July.

He has a degree in journalism and communication from the Free University of Brussels.

== Biography ==
In 1985, Madrane joined the Socialist Party in the wake of anti-racist "Touche pas à mon pote" campaigns by SOS Racisme. From 1987 to 1991, he studied at the Free University of Brussels where he obtained a degree in Journalism and Communication. In 2000, he became press attaché to the Regional Secretary of State for Housing Alain Hutchinson. The same year he was elected as a municipal councillor in Etterbeek, where he became the group leader of the PS on the municipal council.

From 2004 to 2009, Madrane served a member of the Parliament of the Brussels-Capital Region, where he focused on advocating for greater diversity in the civil service and opposing discrimination in hiring in the Brussels Region.

In 2010, he became a member of the Federal Parliament, and in 2011, was elected vice-president of the Brussels Federation of the PS. Madrane held these two positions until December 2012, when he became Secretary of State in charge of Public Cleanliness and Town Planning in the Brussels-Capital Region, and Minister in charge of Vocational Training, Social Action, Culture, Sport, International Relations and Transport education at the French Community Commission (Cocof).

Following the 2014 regional elections, Madrane joined the Government of the French Community of Belgium, where he was appointed Minister for Youth Aid, Houses of Justice, Promotion of Brussels, and responsible for supervision over the French Community Commission. Over the course of the 2014–2019 Parliament, he also took on responsibility for overseeing government remits on sport and youth.

Following the 2019 regional elections, Madrane was elected deputy for Brussels, subsequently being appointed Speaker of the Parliament of the Brussels-Capital Region.
