= Françoise Dupuis =

Belgian politician (born 1949)

President of the Parliament of the Brussels-Capital Region
- In office 2009–2014

Member of the Brussels Parliament
- In office 1995–2014

Personal details
- Born: 18 July 1949 (age 77)
- Education: Université libre de Bruxelles; University of East Anglia

Françoise Dupuis (born 18 July 1949) is a Belgian politician who was a Minister for the Parti Socialiste. She held the post of President of the Parliament of the Brussels-Capital Region from 2009 to 2014.

She was educated at the Université libre de Bruxelles (Philosophy and Literature) and the University of East Anglia (MA).

She is the ex-wife of Philippe Moureaux.
