= Reformist Movement =

Political party in French-speaking Belgium

Reformist Movement Mouvement réformateur
- Abbreviation: MR
- President: Georges-Louis Bouchez
- Founded: 24 March 2002; 24 years ago
- Merger of: Liberal Reformist Party; Citizens' Movement for Change; Democratic Front of Francophones
- Headquarters: National Secretariat; Avenue de la Toison d'Or 84-86; 1060; Brussels, Belgium
- Think tank: Centre Jean Gol
- Student wing: Fédération des Étudiants Libéraux
- Youth wing: Jeunes MR
- Ideology: Liberalism (Belgian)
- Political position: Centre-right to right-wing
- Regional affiliation: Liberal Group
- European affiliation: Alliance of Liberals and Democrats for Europe
- European Parliament group: Renew Europe
- International affiliation: Liberal International
- Flemish counterpart: Anders
- German-speaking counterpart: Party for Freedom and Progress
- Colours: Blue
- Slogan: L’Avenir s’éclaire ('The Future is Brighter')
- Chamber of Representatives (French-speaking seats): 20 / 60
- Senate (French-speaking seats): 8 / 24
- Walloon Parliament: 20 / 75
- Parliament of the French Community: 32 / 94
- Parliament of the German-speaking Community: 3 / 25
- Brussels Parliament (French-speaking seats): 18 / 72
- European Parliament (French-speaking seats): 3 / 22
- Benelux Parliament: 3 / 22

Website
- mr.be

The Reformist Movement (French: Mouvement réformateur [muvmɑ̃ ʁefɔʁmatœʁ], MR) is a liberal French-speaking political party in Belgium, which includes social-liberal and conservative-liberal factions. Stemming from the Belgian Liberal Party founded in 1846, the MR is one of the oldest parties on the European continent.

Since October 2014, the party has provided two prime ministers: Charles Michel and Sophie Wilmès. It has been a member of every federal government since the 2000s. At the federated entities level, the MR was in charge of Wallonia from 2017 to 2019 with Willy Borsus as minister-president of Wallonia. It is currently in charge of the French Community with Pierre-Yves Jeholet as minister-president of the French Community.

The MR emerged victorious from the 2024 elections, becoming the leading French-speaking party. In Wallonia, the party came out on top with 29.6% of the vote. In Brussels, the MR also placed first, with 25.9% of the vote. Just a few days after the elections, the MR announced it would work closely with Les Engagés to quickly form governments in the Walloon Region and the French Community. Having a majority on the French-speaking side of the Federal parliament, they joined forces to work on the formation of a new Belgian government.

The MR is an alliance between four liberal parties, three French-speaking and one German-speaking. The Liberal Reformist Party (PRL) and the Francophone Democratic Federalists (FDF) started the alliance in 1993, and were joined in 1998 by the Citizens' Movement for Change (MCC). The alliance was then known as the PRL-FDF-MCC federation. The alliance became the MR during a congress in 2002, where the German-speaking liberal party, the Party for Freedom and Progress joined as well. The label PRL is no longer used, and the three other parties still use their own names. The MR is a member of Liberal International and the Alliance of Liberals and Democrats for Europe (ALDE) Party. However, on 25 September 2011, the FDF decided to leave the coalition. They did not agree with the manner in which president Charles Michel defended the rights of the French-speaking people in the agreement concerning the splitting of the Brussels-Halle-Vilvoorde district, during the 2010–11 Belgian government formation.

== Ideology and policies ==
Over the years, the MR has always oscillated between ideological markers closer to conservative liberalism or social liberalism. Its fundamental principles remain however the same through time, such as defending civil liberties, free market, entrepreneurial freedom, and equal opportunities. The MR is generally positioned in the centre-right or right of the political spectrum.

During Georges-Louis Bouchez's tenure as party president, the party is said to have shifted further to the right, with critics of the party even going so far as to say that the positions of some of its members were increasingly moving towards the far-right. Bouchez has for example often publicly pointed out some excesses of the woke movement and he welcomed former members of the far-right Chez Nous party to the MR.

On its current platform, the party advocates higher revenues through lower taxes; time-limited unemployment benefits; life extension of the most recent nuclear reactors; greater investment in police, justice and defense; less government and state neutrality. MR is "belgicain", in favor of Belgian unity and a strong federal state.

=== Foreign policy ===
The MR is also a strong supporter of the European Union and NATO. It has always defended support, including military aid, for Ukraine since the Russian invasion in 2022. In 2024, the MR was the only party from De Croo Government to be opposed to Belgium recognizing the State of Palestine.

=== Electoral positioning ===
During the 2019 election campaign, the RePresent research centre — composed of political scientists from five universities (UAntwerpen, KU Leuven, VUB, UCLouvain and ULB) — studied the electoral programmes of Belgium's thirteen main political parties. This study classified the parties on two "left-right" axes, from "-5" (extreme left) to "5" (extreme right): a "classic" socio-economic axis, which refers to state intervention in the economic process and the degree to which the state should ensure social equality, and a socio-cultural axis, which refers to a divide articulated around an identity-based opposition on themes such as immigration, Europe, crime, the environment, emancipation, etc.

The MR then presented a centre-right programme (0.85) on the socio-economic level, and the most centrist (0.4) of the Belgian political spectrum on the socio-cultural level.

The RePresent centre repeated the exercise during the 2024 election campaign for the twelve main parties. The MR's positioning shifted towards the right on the socio-cultural axis (1.35) and especially on the socio-economic axis (3.57), where it became the most right-wing Belgian political party.

== Presidents ==
- 2002–2003: Daniel Ducarme
- 2003–2004: Antoine Duquesne
- 2004–2011: Didier Reynders
- 2011–2014: Charles Michel
- 2014–2019: Olivier Chastel
- 2019: Charles Michel
- 2019–present: Georges-Louis Bouchez

== Representation in EU institutions ==
In the European Parliament, Mouvement Réformateur sits in the Renew Europe group with three MEPs: Sophie Wilmès, Olivier Chastel and Benoit Cassart.

In the European Committee of the Regions, Mouvement Réformateur sits in the Renew Europe CoR group, with two full and three alternate members for the 2025–2030 mandate. Willy Borsus is second vice-president of the Renew Europe CoR Group.

== Election results ==
=== Chamber of Representatives ===
Election	Votes	%	Seats	+/-	Government
1995	623,250	10.3	19 / 150		Opposition
1999	630,219	10.1	18 / 150	▼1	Coalition
2003	748,954	11.4	24 / 150	▲6	Coalition
2007	835,073	12.5	23 / 150	▼1	Coalition
2010	605,617	9.3	18 / 150	▼5	Coalition
2014	650,260	9.6	20 / 150	▲2	Coalition
2019	512,825	7.6	14 / 150	▼6	Coalition
2024	716,934	10.3	20 / 150	▲6	Coalition

=== Senate ===
Election	Votes	%	Seats	+/-
1995	672,798	11.2	5 / 40	
1999	654,961	10.6	5 / 40	0
2003	795,757	12.2	5 / 40	0
2007	815,755	12.3	6 / 40	▲1
2010	599,618	9.3	4 / 40	▼2

=== Regional ===
==== Brussels Parliament ====
Election	Votes	%		Seats	+/-	Government
Election	Votes	F.E.C.	Overall	Seats	+/-	Government
1989	83,011		18.9 (#2)	15 / 75		Opposition
1995	144,478		35.0 (#1)	28 / 75	▲13	Coalition
1999	146,845	40.1 (#1)	34.4 (#1)	27 / 75	▼1	Coalition
2004	127,122	32.5 (#2)	28.0 (#2)	25 / 89	▼2	Opposition
2009	121,905	29.8 (#1)	26.5 (#1)	24 / 89	▼1	Opposition
2014	94,227	23.0 (#2)	20.4 (#2)	18 / 89	▼6	Opposition
2019	65,502	16.9 (#3)	14.3 (#3)	13 / 89	▼5	Opposition
2024	101,157	26.0 (#1)		20 / 89	▲7	Coalition

==== Walloon Parliament ====
Election	Votes	%	Seats	+/-	Government
1995	447,542	23.7 (#2)	19 / 75		Opposition
1999	470,454	24.7 (#2)	21 / 75	▲2	Coalition
2004	478,999	24.3 (#2)	20 / 75	▼1	Opposition
2009	469,792	23.1 (#2)	19 / 75	▼1	Opposition
2014	546,363	26.7 (#2)	25 / 75	▲6	Opposition
2019	435,878	21.4 (#2)	20 / 75	▼5	Coalition
2024	612.010	29.1 (#1)	26 / 75	▲6	Coalition

=== European Parliament ===
Election	List leader	Votes	%		Seats	+/-	EP Group
Election	List leader	Votes	F.E.C.	Overall	Seats	+/-	EP Group
1979	André Damseaux	372,904	17.76 (#4)	6.85	2 / 24	New	LD
1984	Daniel Ducarme	540,610	24.14 (#2)	9.45	3 / 24	▲1	LDR
1989	François-Xavier de Donnea	423,479	18.90 (#2)	7.18	2 / 24	▼1	LDR
1994 (Note: Run in a joint list with FDF.)	Jean Gol	541,724	24.25 (#2)	9.08	2 / 25	0	ELDR
1999	Daniel Ducarme	624,445	26.99 (#1)	10.03	2 / 25	0	ELDR
2004	Louis Michel	671,422	27.58 (#2)	10.35	3 / 24	▲1	ALDE
2009	Louis Michel	640,092	26.05 (#2)	9.74	2 / 22	▼1	ALDE
2014	Louis Michel	661,332	27.10 (#2)	9.88	3 / 21	▲1	ALDE
2019	Olivier Chastel	470,654	19.29 (#3)	7.06	2 / 21	▼1	RE
2024	Sophie Wilmès	900,413	34.88 (#1)	12.62	3 / 22	▲1	RE

== Notable figures ==
- Sophie Wilmès
- Charles Michel
- Didier Reynders
- Louis Michel
- Pierre-Yves Jeholet
- Willy Borsus
- Christine Defraigne
- Daniel Ducarme
- Antoine Duquesne
- Jean Gol
- Sabine Laruelle
- Jacques Simonet
- Gérard Deprez

== See also ==
- Liberalism
- Liberalism in Belgium
- Contributions to liberal theory
- Liberalism worldwide
- Liberal Archive
