= List of members of the Parliament of the Brussels-Capital Region, 2009–2014 =

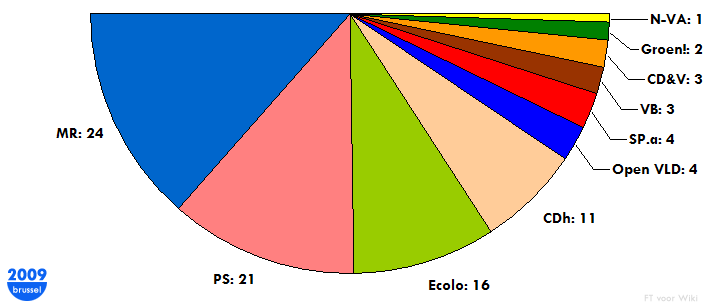
Composition of the Brussels Parlement (MR is now split into MR and FDF)

This is a list of current members of the Brussels Parliament, arranged alphabetically. The Parliament counts 89 members, 17 of which are reserved for the Dutch-language group. Of the remaining 72 French-speaking members, 19 are also member of the Parliament of the French Community.

== Composition (2011–) ==
The elections took place in 2009.

Party	Seats	+/-
French language group
Socialist Party; Parti Socialiste (PS)	21	▼5
Ecolo	16	▲9
Reformist Movement; Mouvement Réformateur (MR)	13	–
Humanist Democratic Centre; Centre Démocrate Humaniste (CDH)	11	–
Francophone Democratic Federalists; Fédéralistes Démocrates Francophones (FDF)	11	–
Dutch language group
Open Flemish Liberals and Democrats; Open Vlaamse Liberalen en Democraten (Open VLD)	4	0
Socialist Party – Differently; Socialistische Partij Anders	4	▲1
Christian Democratic and Flemish; Christen-Democratisch en Vlaams (CD&V)	3	0
Green! Groen!	2	▲1
New Flemish Alliance; Nieuw-Vlaamse Alliantie	1	▲1
Flemish Interest; Vlaams Belang	1	
Independent	2	–
Total	89	

== List of members ==
Party	Language group	Member of Parliament
PS	French	Mohamed Azzouzi
PS	French	Sfia Bouarfa
PS	French	Michèle Carthé
PS	French	Mohammadi Chahid (replaces Fadila Laanan)
PS	French	Philippe Close
PS	French	Mohamed Daif
PS	French	Caroline Désir
PS	French	Bea Diallo
PS	French	Françoise Dupuis
PS	French	Ahmed El Ktibi
PS	French	Nadia El Yousfi
PS	French	Alain Hutchinson (replaces Karine Lalieux)
PS	French	Jamal Ikazban
PS	French	Catherine Moureaux (replaces Fatiha Saidi)
PS	French	Anne-Sylvie Mouzon (replaces Charles Picqué)
PS	French	Mohamed Ouriaghli
PS	French	Emin Özkara
PS	French	Olivia P'tito (replaces Emir Kir)
PS	French	Freddy Thielemans
PS	French	Eric Tomas
PS	French	Rudi Vervoort
Ecolo	French	Aziz Albishari
Ecolo	French	Dominique Braeckman (replaces Christos Doulkeridis)
Ecolo	French	Jean-Claude Defossé
Ecolo	French	Céline Delforge
Ecolo	French	Anne Dirix
Ecolo	French	Anne Herscovici
Ecolo	French	Zakia Khattabi
Ecolo	French	Vincent Lurquin
Ecolo	French	Alain Maron
Ecolo	French	Jacques Morel
Ecolo	French	Ahmed Mouhssin
Ecolo	French	Marie Nagy
Ecolo	French	Yaron Pesztat (replaces Evelyne Huytebroeck)
Ecolo	French	Arnaud Pinxteren
Ecolo	French	Barbara Trachte
Ecolo	French	Vincent Vanhalewyn (replaces Sarah Turine)
MR	French	Françoise Bertieaux
MR	French	Jacques Brotchi
MR	French	Anne Charlotte d'Ursel
MR	French	Olivier de Clippele
MR	French	Alain Destexhe
MR	French	Vincent De Wolf
MR	French	Willem Draps
MR	French	Marion Lemesre
MR	French	Philippe Pivin
MR	French	Jacqueline Rousseaux (replaces Corinne De Permentier)
MR	French	Françoise Schepmans
MR	French	Viviane Teitelbaum
MR	French	Gaëtan Van Goidsenhoven (replaces Bernard Clerfayt)
FDF	French	Michel Colson (replaces Olivier Maingain)
FDF	French	Emmanuel De Bock (replaces Antoinette Spaak)
FDF	French	Serge de Patoul
FDF	French	Béatrice Fraiteur
FDF	French	Didier Gosuin
FDF	French	Cécile Jodogne
FDF	French	Gisèle Mandaila Malamba
FDF	French	Isabelle Molenberg
FDF	French	Martine Payfa
FDF	French	Caroline Persoons
FDF	French	Fatoumata Sidibe (replaces Armand De Decker)
cdH	French	Julie de Groote (replaces Francis Delpérée)
cdH	French	Hervé Doyen (replaces Joëlle Milquet)
cdH	French	André du Bus de Warnaffe
cdH	French	Hamza Fassi-Fihri
cdH	French	Céline Fremault
cdH	French	Ahmed El Khannouss
cdH	French	Bertin Mampaka Mankamba
cdH	French	Pierre Migisha
cdH	French	Mahinur Özdemir
cdH	French	Joël Riguelle
Independent	French	Danielle Caron (former cdH)
CD&V	Dutch	Bianca Debaets (replaces Brigitte Grouwels)
CD&V	Dutch	Brigitte De Pauw (replaces Steven Vanackere)
CD&V	Dutch	Walter Vandenbossche
Vlaams Belang	Dutch	Dominiek Lootens-Stael
Groen!	Dutch	Annemie Maes
Groen!	Dutch	Elke Van den Brandt (replaces Bruno De Lille)
Independent	Dutch	Johan Demol (former Vlaams Belang)
Independent	Dutch	Greet Van Linter (former Vlaams Belang)
N-VA	Dutch	Paul De Ridder
VLD	Dutch	Els Ampe
VLD	Dutch	René Coppens (replaces Guy Vanhengel)
VLD	Dutch	Carla Dejonghe
VLD	Dutch	Jean-Luc Vanraes
sp.a	Dutch	Fouad Ahidar
sp.a	Dutch	Sophie Brouhon
sp.a	Dutch	Elke Roex
sp.a	Dutch	Jef Van Damme (replaces Pascal Smet)

== Sources ==
- "Les députés". The Brussels Parliament. Archived from the original on 2008-05-27. - Only available in French and Dutch.
