= List of flags of Brussels =

This is a list of flags of Brussels, including symbolic regional and sub-regional flags, standards and banners used exclusively in Brussels.

== Regional flag ==
Flag	Date	Use	Description	Note
	9 January 2015–present	Flag of the Brussels-Capital Region	Stylized yellow, grey and white iris on a blue background.	
	9 January 2015–present	Flag of the Brussels-Capital Region	Stylized yellow, grey and blue iris on a white background.	
	9 January 2015–present	Flag of the Brussels-Capital Region	Stylized blue, grey and white iris on a yellow background.	
	9 January 2015–present	Flag of the Brussels-Capital Region	Stylized yellow, blue and white iris on a grey background.	
	9 January 2015–present	Flag of the Brussels-Capital Region	Stylized black and white iris on a white background.	
	9 January 2015–present	Flag of the Brussels-Capital Region	Stylized black and white iris on a black background.	

== Community Commissions ==
Flag	Date	Use	Description	Note
		Flag of the Common Community Commission	A white bordered yellow iris on a blue background.	
	1992–present	Flag of the Flemish Community Commission	A black lion, red clawed and tongued on a yellow background, with a blue vertical stripe along the brocade with a yellow iris with a white border in the brocade top. The flag of the Flemish Community Commission is based on the former flag of the Brussels-Capital Region and the flag of Flanders.	
		Flag of the French Community Commission	Quartered 1. and 4. yellow with a red cock 2. and 3. blue with a yellow iris with a white border. The flag of the Flemish Community Commission is based on the former flag of the Brussels-Capital Region and the flag of Wallonia.	

== Municipalities ==
Flag	Date	Use	Description	Note
		Flag of the Municipality of Anderlecht	Two equally long strips of blue and yellow.	
	6 January 1925–present	Flag of the Municipality of Auderghem	Divided into three fields, blue (upper left half), green (lower left half) and red (right half).	
	18 December 2008–present	Flag of the Municipality of Berchem-Sainte-Agathe	Quartered of white and green.	
	1930s–present	Flag of the City of Brussels	Two equally long strips of green and red with a yellow St Michael's at the centre.	
		Flag of the Municipality of Etterbeek	Two equally long strips of blue and white.	
		Flag of the Municipality of Evere	Right beveled in four lanes of white and green.	
		Flag of the Municipality of Forest	Two equally long strips of green and white.	
		Flag of the Municipality of Ganshoren	Two equally long strips of red and white.	
		Flag of the Municipality of Ixelles	Two equally long strips of green and white.	
		Flag of the Municipality of Jette	Two equally long strips of blue and yellow.	
	1984–1995, ?–present	Flag of the Municipality of Koekelberg	Two equally long strips of green and white.	
		Flag of the Municipality of Molenbeek-Saint-Jean	Two equally long strips of blue and yellow.	
		Flag of the Municipality of Saint-Gilles	Two equally long strips of blue and yellow.	
		Flag of the Municipality of Saint-Josse-ten-Noode	Two equally long strips of blue and red.	
		Flag of the Municipality of Schaerbeek	Two equally long strips of green and white.	
		Flag of the Municipality of Uccle	Two equally long strips of blue and white.	
		Flag of the Municipality of Watermael-Boitsfort	Two equally long strips of blue and white.	
		Flag of the Municipality of Woluwe-Saint-Lambert	Two equally long strips of black and of white.	
		Flag of the Municipality of Woluwe-Saint-Pierre	Two equally long strips of green and white.	

== Universities ==
Flag	Date	Use	Description	Note
		Flag of the Université Libre de Bruxelles	Seal of the ULB on a white background.	
	19 March 1970–present	Flag of the Vrije Universiteit Brussel	Coat of arms of the VUB on a white background.	

== Historical ==
=== Regional ===
Flag	Date	Use	Description	Note
	16 May 1991–9 January 2015	Flag of the Brussels-Capital Region	A white bordered yellow iris on a blue background.	

=== Municipal ===
Flag	Date	Use	Description
	1900s	Flag of the City of Brussels	Two equally long strips of green and red.
	1900s	Flag of the City of Brussels	Two equally long strips of green and red.
	1930s	Flag of the City of Brussels	A green border on a red background.
	1841–1984	Flag of the Municipality of Koekelberg	Two equally long strips of green and pink.
	1995–?	Flag of the Municipality of Koekelberg	
	?–30 March 1921	Flag of the Municipality of Laeken	A yellow field with two stripes in blue.
