= Symbols of Brussels =

The symbols of Brussels are the objects, images, or cultural expressions that are emblematic, representative, or otherwise characteristic of Brussels and its culture. These national symbols are cultural icons that have emerged from Brusselian folklore and tradition, meaning few have any official status. However, most if not all maintain recognition at a national or international level, and some, such as the flag of the Brussels-Capital Region, have been codified in, and are established, official, and recognised symbols of Brussels.

== Vexillology ==
The flag of the Brussels-Capital Region consists of a stylised yellow iris on a blue background.
The flag of the Flemish Community Commission consists of the former flag of the Brussels-Capital Region and the flag of Flanders.
The flag of the French Community Commission consists of the former flag of the Brussels-Capital Region and the flag of Wallonia.

== Cultural ==
Manneken Pis, a bronze statue of a boy urinating into a fountain, symbolises the playful Brussels spirit known as zwanze, a self-deprecating humour tied to local dialects and lifestyle. He is regularly dressed in themed costumes for special occasions, reflecting various events and traditions.
The Ommegang, a folkloric costumed procession, commemorating the Joyous Entry of Emperor Charles V and his son Philip II in the city in 1549, takes place every year in July.
The Meyboom is an annual tradition dating back to 1308, involving the planting of a maypole on 9 August. According to legend, it commemorates a 1213 victory over Leuven after a brawl broke out between the two cities over taxation on beer, when the Companions of St Lawrence defended Het Cattenhuys. Grateful, Duke Henry the Courageous granted them the right to plant the tree.
The Iris Festival is the annual and official celebration of the Brussels-Capital Region. It takes place on 8 May and is a day off for Brussels officials.
The Royal Theatre Toone is a typical puppet theater, playing in the local dialect, with a legacy dating back to 1830. Renowned for its commitment to traditional Brussels-style puppetry known as poechenelle.
Saint Verhaegen, often shortened to St V, is an annual holiday celebrating the founding of the Free University of Brussels and its founder held on 20 November.

== Languages ==
Flemish Brusselian (or Brussels Vloms)	Heavily-Francisised Brabantian Dutch dialect that incorporates a sprinkle of Spanish loanwords.
French Brusselian (or Beulemans)	Heavily-Dutchified Belgian French dialect. Named after the play Le Mariage de M^{lle} Beulemans.
Marollian	Picard dialect heavily influenced by Dutch and French. Originating in the Marolles/Marollen neighbourhood of Brussels.
Bargades	Brabantian variety of bargoens.

== Fauna and flora ==
The Brussels Griffon, a breed of toy dog originating in the city.
The Laekenois, a breed of Belgian Shepherd originating in the city.
The yellow iris, Brussels' floral emblem. Legend has it that during the time of the Dukes of Brabant in the 11th and 12th centuries, the duke's men on horseback navigated marshes by following spots where irises grew, gaining an advantage over opponents who got stuck in the unfamiliar terrain during an assault.
Brussels sprouts, a cultivar group of cabbages originating in the city.

== Food and drink ==
Brussels waffle, type of waffle dating back to the 18th century.
Pain à la grecque is a pastry consisting of a simple rectangle of milk bread, brown sugar, and cinnamon sprinkled with granulated sugar.
Lambic and its derived beers.
Pralines type of chocolate invented by the chocolatier Jean Neuhaus II in the Royal Saint-Hubert Galleries.
Witloof are blanched endives was accidentally discovered in the 1850s at the Botanical Garden of Brussels.
Speculoos is a type of biscuit developed in the 20th century, as an alternative for people who could not afford Dutch speculaas.

== Literature ==
Colijn Caillieu (c. 1430-1440–1503) served as the first poet of Brussels from 1474 to 1485 and was the factor of a number of chambers of rhetoric. Surviving works include Tdal sonder wederkeeren and Vrou Margriete. Experts often identify him with Colijn van Rijssele, possibly the author of De Spiegel Der Minnen and the play Van Narcissus ende Echo.
Michel de Ghelderode (Adémar Adolphe Louis Martens, 1898–1962): avant-garde dramatist who wrote in French. Known for exploring the extremes of human experience, one of his notable works is the play Pantagleize, which reflects his thematic range by addressing societal absurdities and the human condition.
Charles De Coster (1827–1879) was a novelist and folklorist best known for his influential work The Legend of Thyl Ulenspiegel and Lamme Goedzak.
Hergé (Georges Prosper Remi, 1907–1983): cartoonist known for creating the iconic series The Adventures of Tintin, considered one of the most popular European comics of the 20th century.
Jean d'Osta (Jean Van Osta, 1909–1993): writer, journalist, and humourist known for his works on Brussels and its dialect, Brusselian. He created the popular character Jef Kazak, featured in Belgian magazines Pourquoi Pas? and Vlan.

== Music ==
Jacques Brel (1929–1978): singer-songwriter, and performer, renowned for his emotionally charged and poetic chansons.
Toots Thielemans (Jean-Baptiste Frédéric Isidor, Baron Thielemans, 1922–2016): jazz harmonicist, guitarist, and whistler, renowned for his remarkable contributions to the world of jazz and his iconic harmonica solos.
Annie Cordy (Léonie Juliana, Baroness Cooreman, 1928–2020): singer, actress, and comedian renowned for her vibrant stage presence and a prolific career that encompassed music, film, and theater.
Grand Jojo (Jules Jean Vanobbergen, 1936–2021): singer-songwriter known for his comedic and festive music.

== Myth and folklore ==
Herkenbald was a legendary magistrate of Brussels who is said to have lived in the around 1020. He was considered the example of an incorruptible judge.
The Fontaine d'Amour or Minnebron is a spring in Josaphat Park named after a legend about a noblewoman, Herlinde, who drowned herself there after her lover, Theobald, was called to war and never returned. According to local belief, if two lovers drink from the spring together, they will be united before the year's end.
Everard t'Serclaes (c. 1320–1388): was a citizen of Brussels who was made famous by his recovery of the city from the Flemings during the War of the Brabantian Succession.
Pogge (Pierre De Cruyer, 1821–1890): folk hero, revered for his honesty, strong sense of justice, and dedication to doing good. He became highly esteemed for his ability to address local issues with his consistent mantra, "Alles es just" lit. 'Everything is fine'.

== People ==
Saint Michael the Archangel, the patron saint of Brussels together with Saint Gudula.
Saint Gudula, the patron saint of Brussels together with Saint Michael the Archangel.
Charles (c. 953–992), Duke of Lower Lorraine who founded Brussels in 979.
Charles Picqué (born 1 November 1948), the first Minister-President of the Brussels Capital-Region regarded as "Father of the Nation".

== Buildings ==
The Grand-Place/Grote Markt is a historically significant and Brussels' central square known for its well-preserved Gothic and Baroque architecture, prominently featuring the Town Hall and guildhalls. The square serves as a venue for various events, cultural festivals, and markets, contributing to its status as a central gathering place with a diverse array of activities throughout the year.
The Parc du Cinquantenaire/Jubelpark is an expansive public park located in the European Quarter, recognised for its memorial arch constructed for the Brussels International Exposition of 1897. Serving both cultural and recreational purposes, the park encompasses museums such as the Art & History Museum and Autoworld.
The Atomium, a symbolic 103 m-tall (338 ft) modernist structure built for Expo 58. Consisting of nine steel spheres connected by tubes, it forms a model of an iron crystal (specifically, a unit cell), magnified 165 billion times.

== Miscellaneous ==
Art Nouveau, prominent art style in the late 19th and early 20th centuries, is characterised by ornate and organic designs. Architects such as Victor Horta, Paul Hankar and Henry van de Velde significantly contributed to the city's artistic landscape, leaving a lasting impact with their buildings and decorative arts featuring flowing lines and nature-inspired motifs.
Brussels lace type of pillow lace that originated in and around the city.
The Sonian Forest is a large and ancient forest located southeast of Brussels. Stretching across the three federal regions of Belgium, the forest is characterised by diverse ecosystems, including beech and oak woodlands, and is a significant natural and recreational area for residents and visitors.

== Municipal symbols ==
=== City of Brussels ===
Coat of arms of the City of Brussels

Versions
- Lesser version
- Shield: Archangel Michael slaying the Devil
- Supporters: Two lions argent, each holding a banner. The two banners show the coats of arms of respectively Brabant and the City of Brussels.
- Compartment: Mount vert
- Other elements: Two crossed flags

==== Coat of arms ====
The coat of arms of the City of Brussels shows two lions on a grassy mount supporting a red shield. The motif of the escutcheon is a golden Archangel Michael (the patron saint of Brussels) slaying a black Devil by piercing it with a spear shaped like a cross. Other elements include two crossed flags behind the shield; one showing a lion on a black field and the other repeating the motif of the shield on a red field.

A lesser version of the coat of arms which includes the shield only, is also common.

Greater arms as depicted in 1730

Greater arms as seen in this First French Empire version

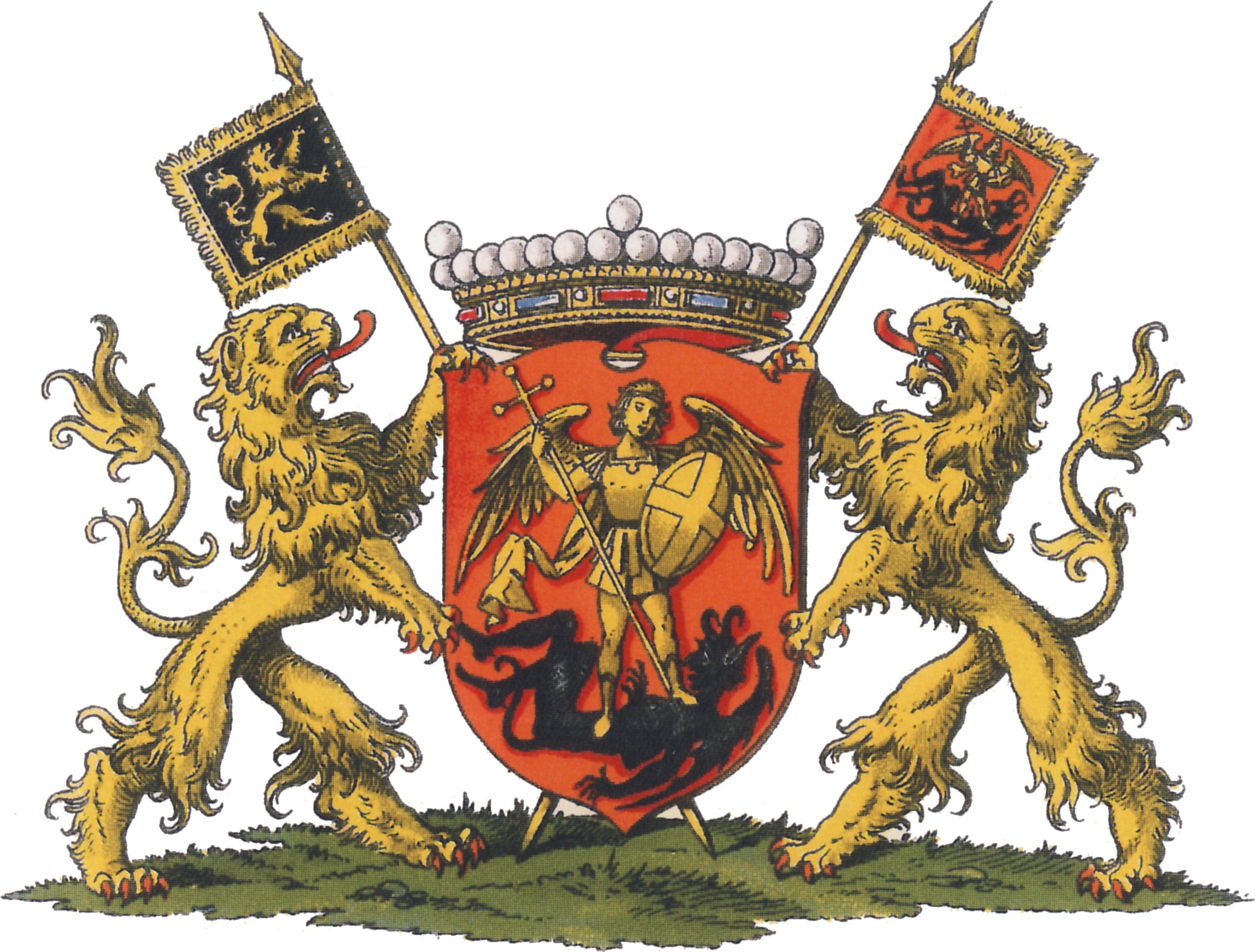
Depicted by Hugo Gerard Ströhl in Heraldischer Atlas, Stuttgart, 1899

==== Flag ====
The municipal flag of Brussels (City of Brussels), as flown from the Town Hall and other buildings is a rectangle, divided horizontally with green over red, with a very large version of the municipal logotype in the centre, and a stylised, disc-shaped silhouette of St. Michael trampling the devil, in dark yellow. It is essentially the same motif as the coat of arms.

=== Other ===
Municipality	Flag	Coat of arms	
Municipality	Flag	Lesser version	Greater version
Anderlecht			—
Auderghem			—
Berchem-Sainte-Agathe			—
City of Brussels			
Etterbeek			—
Evere			
Forest			—
Ganshoren			—
Ixelles			—
Jette			
Koekelberg			
Molenbeek-Saint-Jean			—
Saint-Gilles			
Saint-Josse-ten-Noode			
Schaerbeek			—
Uccle			—
Watermael-Boitsfort			—
Woluwe-Saint-Lambert			
Woluwe-Saint-Pierre			

== See also ==
- Archangel Michael
- Iris pseudacorus
