= Provinces of Belgium =

Subdivisions of Belgium

Provinces of Belgium Provincies van België (Dutch) Provinces de Belgique (French) Provinzen Belgiens (German)
- Category: Province
- Location: Belgium
- Found in: Regions of Belgium
- Number: 10 provinces
- Possible types: Flemish Provinces; Walloon Provinces
- Populations: 295,146 (Luxembourg) – 1,926,522 (Antwerp)
- Areas: 1,097 km^{2} (424 sq mi) (Walloon Brabant) – 4,459 km^{2} (1,722 sq mi) (Luxembourg)
- Government: Provincial government
- Subdivisions: Arrondissement

The Kingdom of Belgium is divided into three regions. Two of these regions, Flanders and Wallonia, are each subdivided into five provinces. The third region, Brussels, does not belong to any province, nor is it subdivided into provinces. Instead, it has amalgamated both regional and provincial functions into a single "Capital Region" administration.

Most of the provinces take their name from earlier duchies and counties of similar location, while their territory is mostly based on the departments installed during French annexation. At the time of the creation of Belgium in 1830, only nine provinces existed, including the province of Brabant, which held the City of Brussels. In 1995, Brabant was split into three areas: Flemish Brabant, which became a part of the region of Flanders; Walloon Brabant, which became part of the region of Wallonia; and the Brussels-Capital Region, which became a third region. These divisions reflected political tensions between the French-speaking Walloons and the Dutch-speaking Flemish; the Brussels-Capital Region is officially bilingual.

The division into provinces is fixed by Article 5 of the Belgian Constitution. The provinces and Brussels are subdivided into 43 administrative arrondissements, and further into 565 municipalities.

== List ==
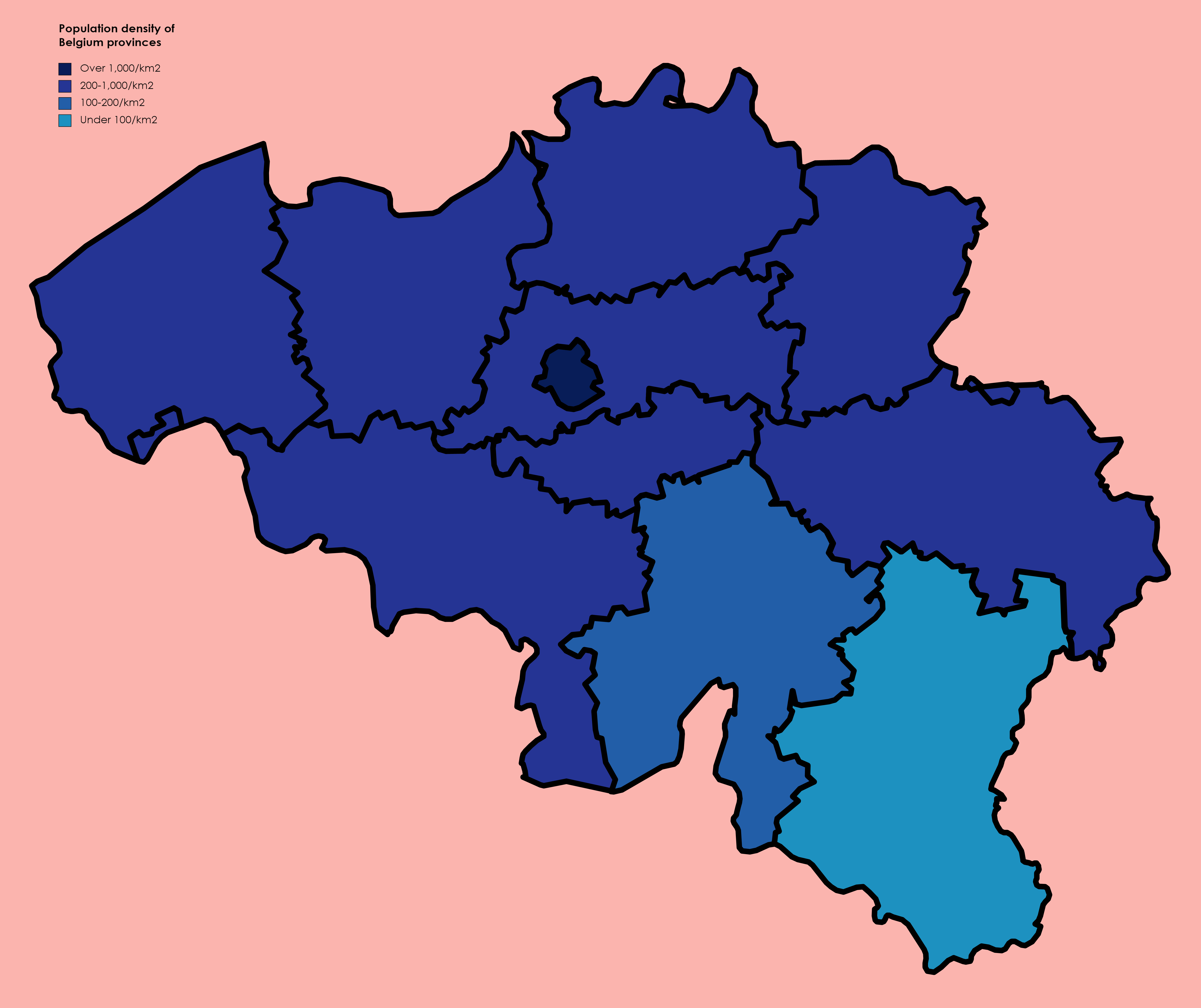
Provinces of Belgium (including the Brussels-Capital Region) by population density as of 1 January 2019

Province	Name in: Dutch; French; German	Capital	Governor (Assumed office)	Area	Population (1 January 2024)	Density	Postal codes	HASC	ISO
Flanders
Antwerp	Antwerpen; Anvers; Antwerpen	Antwerp	Cathy Berx (2008)	2,876 km^{2} (1,110 sq mi)	1,926,522	670/km^{2} (1,700/sq mi)	2000– 2999	BE.AN	VAN
East Flanders	Oost-Vlaanderen; Flandre orientale; Ostflandern	Ghent	Carina Van Cauter (2013)	3,007 km^{2} (1,161 sq mi)	1,572,002	520/km^{2} (1,300/sq mi)	9000– 9999	BE.OV	VOV
Flemish Brabant	Vlaams-Brabant; Brabant flamand; Flämisch-Brabant	Leuven	Jan Spooren (2020)	2,118 km^{2} (818 sq mi)	1,196,773	570/km^{2} (1,500/sq mi)	1500– 1999 (West), 3000– 3499 (East)	BE.VB	VBR
Limburg	Limburg; Limbourg; Limburg	Hasselt	Jos Lantmeeters (2009)	2,427 km^{2} (937 sq mi)	900,098	370/km^{2} (960/sq mi)	3500– 3999	BE.LI	VLI
West Flanders	West-Vlaanderen; Flandre occidentale; Westflandern	Bruges	Carl Decaluwé (2012)	3,197 km^{2} (1,234 sq mi)	1,226,375	380/km^{2} (980/sq mi)	8000– 8999	BE.WV	VWV
Wallonia
Hainaut	Henegouwen; Hainaut; Hennegau	Mons	Tommy Leclercq (2013)	3,813 km^{2} (1,472 sq mi)	1,360,074	360/km^{2} (930/sq mi)	6000– 6599 (East), 7000– 7999 (West)	BE.HT	WHT
Liège	Luik; Liège; Lüttich	Liège	Hervé Jamar (2015)	3,857 km^{2} (1,489 sq mi)	1,119,038	290/km^{2} (750/sq mi)	4000– 4999	BE.LG	WLG
Luxembourg	Luxemburg; Luxembourg; Luxemburg	Arlon	Olivier Schmitz (2016)	4,459 km^{2} (1,722 sq mi)	295,146	66/km^{2} (170/sq mi)	6600– 6999	BE.LX	WLX
Namur	Namen; Namur; Namür	Namur	Denis Mathen (2007)	3,675 km^{2} (1,419 sq mi)	503,895	140/km^{2} (360/sq mi)	5000– 5999	BE.NA	WNA
Walloon Brabant	Waals-Brabant; Brabant wallon; Wallonisch-Brabant	Wavre	Gilles Mahieu (2015)	1,097 km^{2} (424 sq mi)	414,130	380/km^{2} (980/sq mi)	1300– 1499	BE.BW	WBR
Brussels
Brussels Capital Region	Brussels Hoofdstedelijk Gewest; Région de Bruxelles-Capitale; Region Brüssel-Hauptstadt	Brussels City	Rudi Vervoort (2013)	162 km^{2} (63 sq mi)	1,249,597	7,700/km^{2} (20,000/sq mi)	1000– 1299	BE.BR	BBR

== History ==
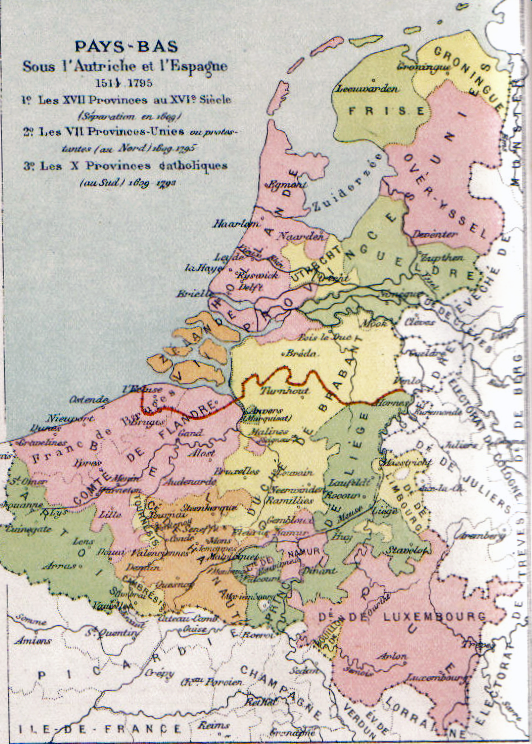
Map of the Seventeen Provinces, red showing the border between the independent (Northern) Netherlands and the Southern Netherlands.

The medieval Low Countries, including present-day Belgium, the Netherlands and Luxembourg, as well as parts of modern Germany and France, comprised a number of rival and independent feudal states of varying sizes. These each had their own identities and governments, though in the early modern period almost all the Belgian states became part of larger entities (the Seventeen Provinces (1549–1581) and the Southern Netherlands (after 1581)). Prominent early states in the area of modern Belgium included the Duchy of Brabant, the County of Flanders, the Prince-Bishopric of Liège and the Duchy of Luxembourg; smaller ones included the County of Hainaut, the Duchy of Limburg and the County of Namur, though there were other small states as well.

The French First Republic

When these territories were annexed by France in 1795, they were reorganised into départments; the borders were redrawn and the historical names were replaced by names of geographical features (generally the main river of the area).

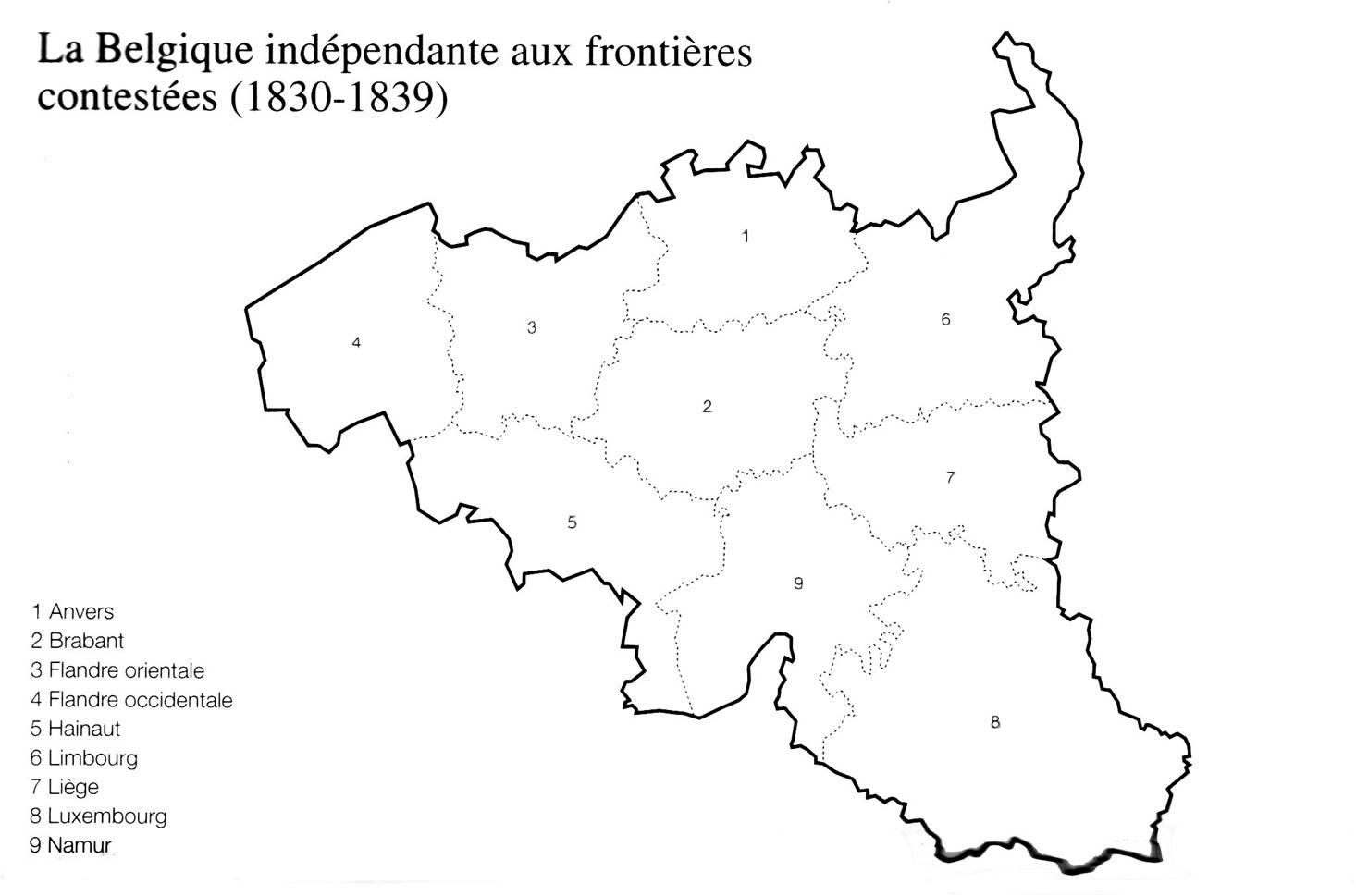
Belgium at its independence in 1830

At the end of French rule and the creation of the United Kingdom of the Netherlands in 1815, the departmental territories were generally retained but were renamed into provinces and the historical names returned. At the time of the independence of Belgium from the Netherlands in 1830, Belgium's territory simply consisted of the existing nine southern provinces. The first article of the Belgian Constitution said: "Belgium is divided into provinces. These provinces are Antwerp, Brabant, West Flanders, East Flanders, Hainaut, Liège, Limburg, Luxembourg, Namur, except for the relations of Luxembourg with the German Confederation." As such, each of the modern provinces of Belgium (with the exception of Antwerp) takes its name from one of the medieval predecessors, whereas the borders largely correspond to those of the French departments, which in most cases differ substantially from the historical entities.

In 1839, as part of the Treaty of London, half of the province of Limburg became part of the Netherlands, which consequently has its own province of Limburg.

In 1920, following the First World War, Belgium annexed the Eupen-Malmedy territory, which became part of Liège Province.

During the second half of the 20th century, Belgium transitioned from a unitary state to a federal state with three Communities and three Regions. As part of the state reforms, the (bilingual) province of Brabant was split in 1995 three ways: into two (unilingual) provinces (Flemish Brabant and Walloon Brabant) and into the (bilingual) Brussels-Capital Region. (The Brussels-Capital Region does not belong to any province, is not a province, and does not contain any provinces.) The two new Brabant provinces became part of the Flemish Region and the Walloon Region respectively. The remaining eight provinces became part of these regions as well, so the Flemish Region and the Walloon Region each contain five provinces.

=== Schematic overview ===
The following table presents a simplified overview of the evolution of the French departments into the present-day Belgian provinces.

Part of: French First Republic – First French Empire	Part of: United Kingdom of the Netherlands	Kingdom of Belgium		
1795–1815	1815–1830	1830–1839	1839–1995	1995–present
Meuse-Inférieure	Limburg	Limburg	Limburg (NL)	
Meuse-Inférieure	Limburg	Limburg	Limburg	
Lys	West Flanders	West Flanders		
Escaut	East Flanders	East Flanders		
Deux-Nèthes	Antwerp	Antwerp		
Dyle	South Brabant	Brabant		Flemish Brabant
Dyle	South Brabant	Brabant		Brussels-Capital Region
Dyle	South Brabant	Brabant		Walloon Brabant
Jemmape	Hainaut	Hainaut		
Sambre-et-Meuse	Namur	Namur		
Ourthe	Liège	Liège		
Forêts	Grand Duchy of Luxembourg (in personal union)	Luxembourg	Luxembourg	
Forêts	Grand Duchy of Luxembourg (in personal union)	Luxembourg	Grand Duchy of Luxembourg (LU)	

== Provincial governments ==
The provincial government consists of three main branches: the Provincial Council, which is the legislative body, the Deputation or Provincial College, which is the executive body, and the Governor, who is appointed by the regional government (i.e. the Flemish or Walloon Government).

The Provincial Councils (Dutch: Provincieraad; French: Conseil provincial) are the representative bodies of the population of the provinces. This is the equivalent of the States-Provincial in the Netherlands. The numbers of seats in the Provincial Councils are proportional to the population of the province; the numbers were reduced in both Flanders and Wallonia, starting 2013 (following the 2012 elections). They are directly elected each six years, at the same time of the municipal elections. Before 1994, the provincial elections instead coincided with the national elections. Until then, the provincial councils also appointed Provincial Senators to the Belgian Senate. The last elections were held on 14 October 2018.

The executive branch was previously called the Permanent Deputation. In the Flemish Region it is now simply called the Deputation (Dutch: Deputatie) and it consists of the Governor and six Deputies elected by the Provincial Council from among its members. Following the next 2018 election, there will be one Deputy less, i.e. five Deputies. In the Walloon Region it is called the Provincial College (French: Collège provincial) which consists of the Governor and four to five Deputies (depending on the number of inhabitants of the province) elected by the Provincial Council from among its members.

In Flemish Brabant, there is also a Deputy Governor (Dutch: Adjunct van de gouverneur). The Deputy Governor is appointed by the Flemish Government on the unanimous advice of the Federal Council of Ministers and must have a considerable knowledge of both the Dutch and the French language. He is responsible for ensuring that the language legislation is observed in the municipalities in the Brussels Periphery.

Following the Fifth State Reform, the responsibility for the provincial institutions was devolved to the Regions. The Regions have the power to amend or replace the existing legislation on the provincial institutions, most notably the Provincial Law of 30 April 1836. In the Flemish Region, the Provincial Decree of 9 December 2005 applies. In the Walloon Region, the Code of Local Democracy and Decentralisation applies. The legal framework in these Regions is still very similar, but that could change in the future. Although the Regions are responsible for the provincial institutions, the Federal State has retained its responsibility over the provinces in certain cases. For instance, the Regions are responsible for the appointment of the Provincial Governors, but only after the unanimous advice of the Federal Council of Ministers. Legislation regarding the Governor and Vice-Governor of Brussels-Capital, and the Deputy Governor of Flemish Brabant, has also remained a federal competency.

== Absence of any province in the Brussels Capital Region ==
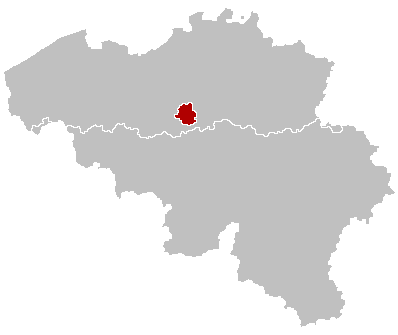
The Brussels Capital Region in Belgium.

The Brussels Capital Region does not belong to any province, nor does it contain any. The extraprovincial status of Brussels has existed since 1995, when the former province of Brabant, which had Brussels as its capital, was divided into the Dutch-speaking province of Flemish Brabant and the French-speaking province of Walloon Brabant.

Within this mainly French speaking region, nearly all former provincial competencies are assumed by its regional institutions and by the French Community Commission, the Flemish Community Commission or the Common Community Commission. However, the Arrondissement of Brussels-Capital has two commissioners of the Federal Government who are called "Governor of the Brussels-Capital Region" and "Vice-Governor". The Governor exercises most of the few remaining powers elsewhere exercised by a provincial governor, particularly in the field of public order, as far as no (federal) law, (regional) decree, ordinance or decision states otherwise.

The Governor is appointed by the cabinet of the Brussels Capital Region on the unanimous advice of the Federal Council of Ministers. The regional government also appoints the Vice-Governor, who must have a considerable knowledge of both French and Dutch and who must ensure that the legislation regarding the use of the two languages is observed in Brussels.

== Proposed additional province ==
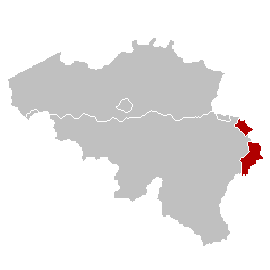
The German-speaking Community.

Because the German-speaking Community is located entirely within Liège Province, it has been proposed on multiple occasions to create an eleventh province, the province of Eupen-Sankt Vith, which would comprise the nine municipalities of the German-speaking Community. Most of the functions carried out by provincial organs would then be exercised by the organs of the German-speaking Community.

However, the community is small in area (854 km^{2} or 330 sq mi) and has only about 76,000 inhabitants, which would make it the smallest and by far the least populated province.

== See also ==
- List of Belgian provinces by GDP
- List of Belgian provinces by Human Development Index
