= Guy Vanhengel =

Belgian politician (born 1958)

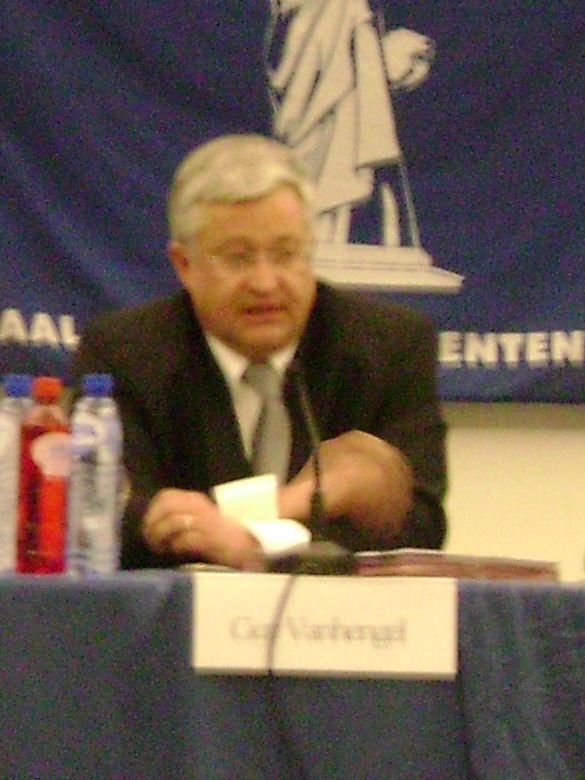
- Vanhengel in 2010
- Born: 10 June 1958 (age 67); Brussels, Belgium
- Occupations: politician, teacher
- Political party: Anders

Guy Vanhengel (born 10 June 1958) is a Flemish politician for Anders (formerly Open Flemish Liberals and Democrats).

== Biography ==
Vanhengel graduated in 1979 and became a teacher, teaching until 1981. After his army service (1981–1982), he started working as a spokesperson to the then secretary of state Annemie Neyts. A few years later, when Guy Verhofstadt first became the party leader for the liberals, he became the spokesperson of the party PVV (1984–1985). When Verhofstadt was called to become vice-premier, Vanhengel went with him as part of his staff (1985–1988). In 1988, Guy Vanhengel became manager of Tourism Flanders and was sent on secondment with the cabinet of Patrick Dewael who held the office of minister of Cultural Affairs (1988–1989). From 1989 to 1995, Vanhengel returned to being party spokesperson of the PVV (later VLD).

In 1995, Vanhengel became a member of the Brussels Parliament, later being made minister in the Brussels government (2000) annex minister in the Flemish Community Commission – Vlaamse Gemeenschapscommissie and the Common Community Commission -Gemeenschappelijke Gemeenschapscommissie.

When Bert Anciaux left the Flemish Government it became imperative that someone from Brussels should take over. IOt was decided that Vanhengel was the man for the job and for a couple of months (2002–2003) he held a post in both the Brussels and the Flemish Government.

In July 2009, Vanhengel became "vice-premier minister" and minister of budget in de Federal Belgian Government. In June 2010, he became a member of the Federal Parliament.

== Political curriculum ==
- Member of the Brussels Parliament (1995–2000)
- President of the Council of the Flemish Community Commission – Vlaamse Gemeenschapscommissie (1999–2000)
- Brussels Minister of Finance, Budget, Civil Affairs and External Relations in the Brussels Regional Government (2000–2004)
- Councilor with the competence of Education, Vocational Training and Budget in the Flemish Community Commission (2000–2004)
- Councilor with the competence of Social Security and Civil Office in the Common Community Commission – Gemeenschappelijke Gemeenschapscommissie (2000–2004)
- Flemish minister of Sport and Brussels Institutional Affairs (2002–2003)
- Brussels-Capital Region Minister of Finance, Budget, External Relations and IT (2004–2009)
- President of the Council of the Flemish Community Commission – Vlaamse Gemeenschapscommissie, with the competence of Education, Vocational Training, Budget and Media Policies (2004–2009)
- Minister with the competence of Health and Budget in the Common Community Commission – Gemeenschappelijke Gemeenschapscommissie (2004–2009)
- Vice-premier and Minister of Budget in the Belgian Government (July 2009–December 2011)
- Brussels Minister of Finance and Budget (December 2011–July 2019)
- Member of the Brussels Parliament (2019– )

== Honours ==
- 26 mei 2014: Grand Officer Order of Leopold.

== Mandates and functions ==
- Information Officer Radio Contact (1979–1982)
- Collaborator of Het Laatste Nieuws (1979–1988)
- Boardmember of NV Brusselse Huisvestingsmaatschappij (1985–1995)
- Boardmember of BRTN (1992–1995)
- Boardmember of NV VAR (1994–1995)
- OCMW councillor in Evere (1983–1989)
- Local Councillor in Evere (1989–...)
- Secretary of the Bureau of the Brussels Capital Council (1995–2000)
- President of the Flemish Community Commission – Vlaamse Gemeenschapscommissie (VGC) (1999–2000)
- Minister in the Brussels-Capital Region Government (2000–2009)
- Member of the Flemish Community Commission – Vlaamse Gemeenschapscommissie, competence Education and Budget (2000–2004)
- Chairperson of the Flemish Community Commission – Vlaamse Gemeenschapscommissie, competence Education and Budget (2004– )

== See also ==
- List of foreign ministers in 2017
- List of current foreign ministers
