= Regulation (Brussels) =

In Belgium, a regulation (Dutch: verordening; French: règlement) is a form of legislation passed by the Brussels Parliament in exercise of its agglomeration competences and by the Common Community Commission in certain cases.

== See also ==
- Ordinance (Belgium)
- Decree (Belgium)
