= Flag of the Brussels-Capital Region =

Flag of Belgian region

Brussels-Capital Region
- Use: Civil and state flag
- Proportion: 2∶3
- Adopted: 2015; 11 years ago
- Design: A stylised iris upon a blue field
- Different versions of the flag

The flag of the Brussels-Capital Region of Belgium consists of a stylized yellow, grey and white iris on a blue background. This is the flag of the whole Brussels Region, and the City of Brussels municipality has a different flag.

A first flag with a gold Iris was adopted by the Capital Region in 1991. In early 2015 a new logo flag became official based on the city's logo that already had been in use in other places.

== Symbolism of the iris ==
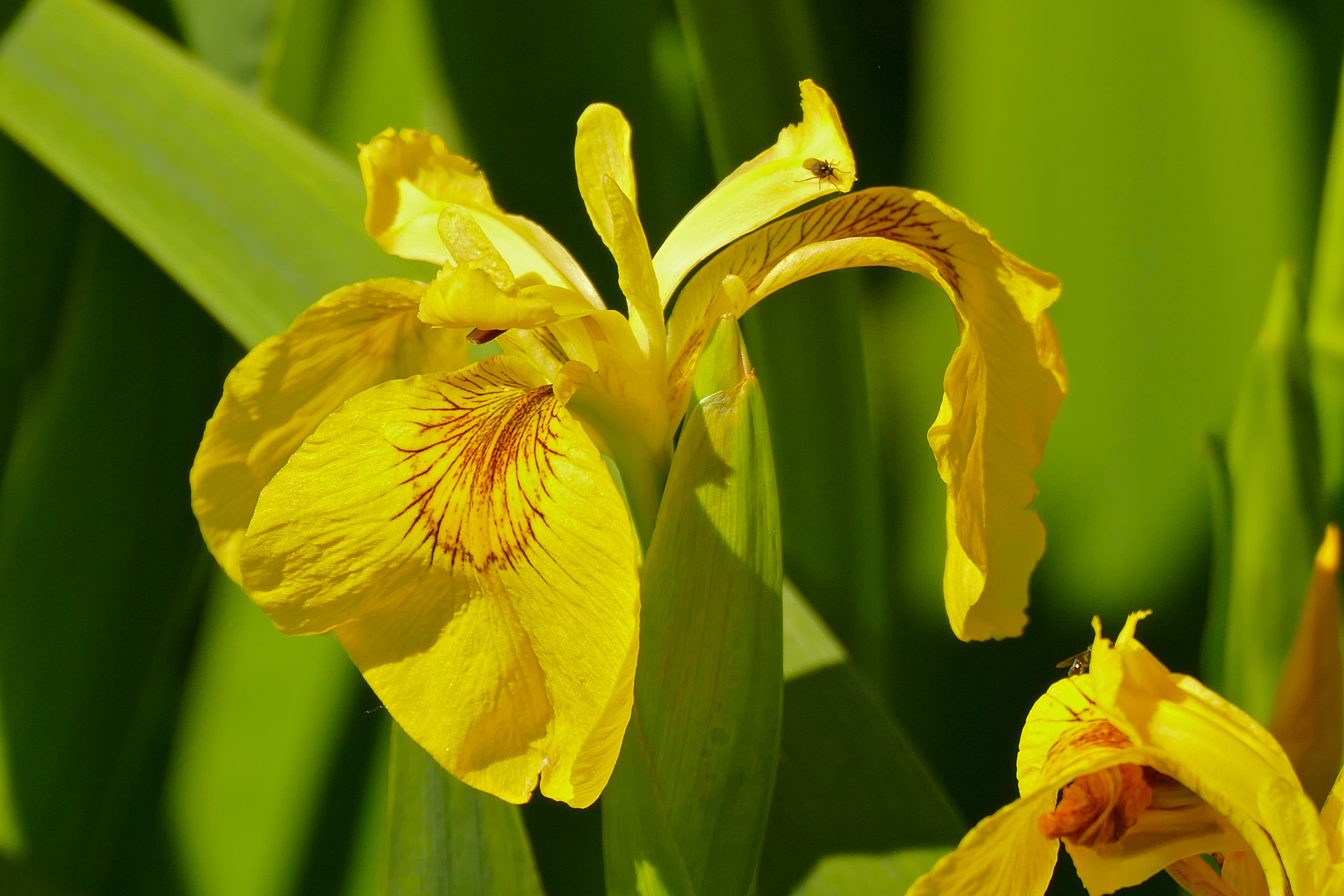
An Iris pseudacorus

The yellow iris, an Iris pseudacorus, as a symbol for Brussels dates back to before 1924 with Cornette writing that the flower was chosen to represent the city as it could be found growing in the marshes – the city itself was founded on marshy ground on Saint-Géry Island – today even through the expansion and industrialisation of the city.

The plant used to surround the city walls and, according to legend, gave a key victory to the Dukes of Brabant: knowing the plant could only grow in shallow water, the Duke's troops could gallop through the flooded plains by keeping to the iris covered areas. His opponents however, seeing them crossing but not knowing of the iris, attempted to cross but got bogged down in the marshes.

The flower also featured on the sceptre of the descendants of Charlemagne. This included Charles of France, who set up a fortified camp in the area, in the Duchy of Lower Lotharingia, and chose the site as the capital. This is considered the foundation of Brussels.

== First flag (1991–2015) ==
Previous flag (1991–2015)

The Brussels-Capital Region, created on 18 June 1989, adopted the plant as the symbol and the flag by ordinance of 16 May 1991. The exact design was chosen through a public competition, with the design by Jacques Richez being chosen. The blue and yellow colours are those of the European Union, of which Brussels is the de facto capital city.

=== Design ===
The flag, as defined by law, had proportions of 2:3. The iris is yellow with a white border and the background is blue.

	Blue	Yellow
Pantone	Blue 280	Yellow 116
Pantone	Blue 280	Gold 874

== Current flag (2015–present) ==
The current flag was proposed in 2014 to match the region's new logo. The stated reason was an evolution of the city's public image, and to maintain a unity in the symbols used by the city. The decision to change the flag, already a clear symbol of Brussels after only 25 years, received criticism. Opposition members complained that it is disrespectful and inappropriate to change a flag to suit the latest fashion in graphic design. On 9 January 2015 the bill was approved by the Parliament of the Brussels-Capital Region, and the flag became official shortly after.

The law provides for six different colour schemes of the emblem, including two in black and white. The flag is expressly not defined in terms of heraldic terminology (a blazon). Instead, the originals of the designs of the flags and the norms for reproduction are kept by the Clerk (Greffe/Griffie) of the Parliament of the Brussels-Capital Region. For the primary colour scheme, the law provides colour values for blue, yellow, and grey in 5 forms, each of which is slightly different from the other. In practice the RGB values are usually used.

	Blue	Yellow	Grey
Pantone	Blue 072	102	421
CMYK	(100%, 85%, 0%, 5%)	(0%, 5%, 93%, 0%)	(16%, 13%, 13%, 20%)
RGB (decimal)	(10, 0, 190)	(255, 242, 3)	(184, 184, 186)
RGB (hexadecimal)	#0900BD	#FFF202	#B9B9BC
RAL	5022	1018	7004

== Derivative flags ==

The original flag's colours and emblem are used on the flag of the French Community Commission and the Flemish Community Commission, both of which are based in the Brussels-Capital Region.

== See also ==
- Symbols of Brussels
- Flag of Belgium
- List of Belgian flags
