= Municipalities of Belgium =

Administrative divisions of Belgium

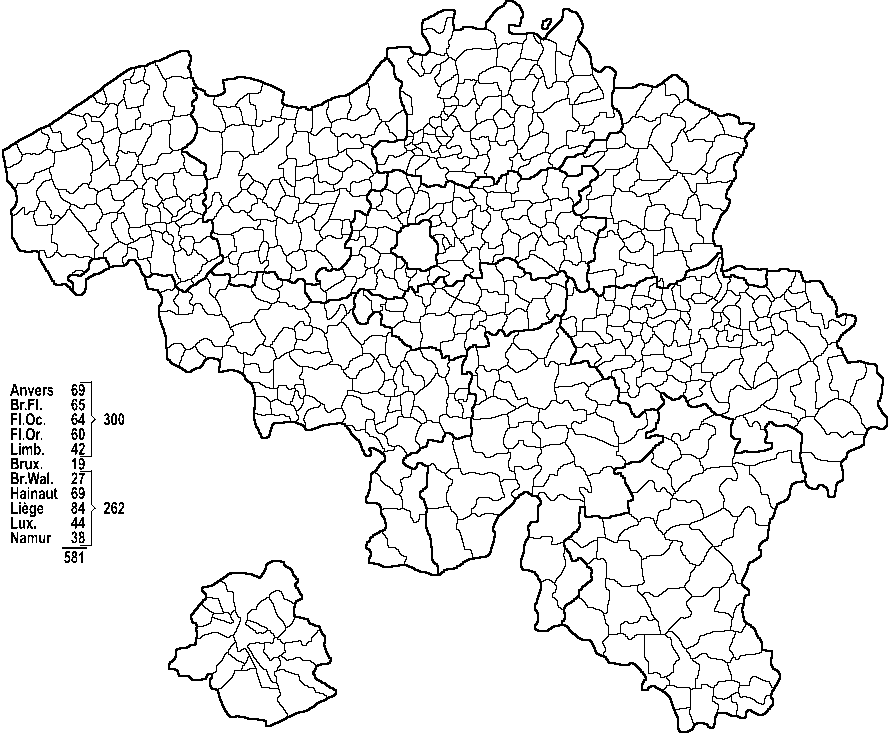
Map showing the provinces and the municipalities of Belgium, with details of Brussels Capital Region expanded in lower left.

Belgium comprises 565 municipalities (French: communes, Dutch: gemeenten, German: Gemeinden), 285 of them grouped into five provinces in Flanders and 261 others in five provinces in Wallonia, while the remaining 19 are in the Brussels Capital Region, which is not divided in provinces. In most cases, the municipalities are the smallest administrative subdivisions of Belgium, but in municipalities with more than 100,000 inhabitants, on the initiative of the local council, sub-municipal administrative entities with elected councils may be created. As such, only Antwerp, having over 500,000 inhabitants, became subdivided into ten districts (Dutch: districten).

The Belgian arrondissements (Dutch: arrondissementen; French: arrondissements; German: Bezirke), an administrative level between province (or the capital region) and municipality, or the lowest judicial level, are in English sometimes called districts as well.

== Lists of municipalities ==
Here are three lists of municipalities for each one of the three regions:

- List of municipalities of the Brussels-Capital Region (19 municipalities)
- List of municipalities of the Flemish Region (285 municipalities)
- List of municipalities in Wallonia (261 municipalities)

== History ==
=== Before 1830 ===
The municipalities, as an administrative division, were officially created in 1795, when the Directoire reorganised the structures of the Ancien Régime. The municipalities with less than 5,000 inhabitants were grouped in so-called canton municipalities. In 1800, these canton municipalities were abolished again and the number of autonomous municipalities became 2,776.

Not much changed during the United Kingdom of the Netherlands, only a number of smaller municipalities were merged.

=== Between 1830 and 1961 ===
In 1831, Belgium was divided into 2,739 municipalities, a number which remained more or less constant until 1961. The law of 30 March 1836 regulated municipalities and their governing bodies. The number of municipalities was reduced to 2,508 when the Belgian borders were recognised in 1839, as 124 municipalities were ceded to the Netherlands and another 119 municipalities became the Grand Duchy of Luxembourg (see the article Communes of Luxembourg for details). New municipalities were created until 1928. There were 2,528 municipalities in 1850, 2,572 in 1875, 2,617 in 1900 and a maximum of 2,675 in 1929. This also includes the municipalities of the East Cantons that were added to Belgium following the First World War.

=== From 1961 to 1977 ===
In 1961, the so-called Unitary Law (Dutch: Eenheidswet; French: Loi unique; German: Einheitsgesetz), of which the fourth chapter was dedicated to the territorial organisation of the municipalities, was adopted. The authority to abolish municipalities was entrusted to the executive branch for a period of 10 years. Municipalities could be merged on financial grounds or on grounds of a geographical, linguistic, economic, social or cultural nature. In 1964 and in 1969 and 1970, roughly 300 municipalities ceased to exist and were subsumed into other municipalities. The number of municipalities was reduced from 2,663 in 1961 to 2,586 in 1965 and to 2,359 in 1971.

Article 4 of the constitution states that each municipality must belong to only one of the four official language areas that were established in 1962–63. In the three officially unilingual language areas, a couple of dozen municipalities in the vicinity of another language area must provide limited facilities for speakers of that other language. As only a law carried by special majorities can change the language status of any municipality, these arrangements have prevented some small municipalities with facilities to be merged in the 1970s, and thus the most minute Belgian municipalities are still found in this group, notably Herstappe with only 84 inhabitants (in 2006).

Lucien Harmegnies, Minister of the Interior in the government of Gaston Eyskens (1968–1972) decided to continue the process of territorial reorganization of Belgium. In 1971, the provisions of the Unity Law were extended and modified to apply to large agglomerations, which were initially excluded from its provisions. It was another Minister of the Interior, Joseph Michel, who managed the process. On 30 December 1975 the law regarding the merger of the municipalities was adopted. The merger became effective on 1 January 1977. The merger of 1977 further reduced the number of municipalities in Belgium from 2,359 to 596.

==== Antwerp ====
Because of the specific nature of the reorganization in Antwerp, the law of 30 December 1975 did not enter into force for Antwerp until 1 January 1983. The formerly-independent municipalities were called districts and were given an advisory function. However, on 1 January 2001 they were given an administrative function again. The merger of Antwerp with the municipalities of Berchem, Borgerhout, Deurne, Hoboken, Ekeren, Merksem and Wilrijk in 1983 finally reduced the number of municipalities in Belgium to 589 and was the last reorganization of the municipalities for several decades because the merger of the 19 municipalities of Brussels was postponed indefinitely.

=== 21st century ===
The fifth state reform (2001) transferred the responsibility over municipalities from the federal level to the three regions.

This did not instantly have any significant effect on the reorganisation of municipalities, up until the Flemish Bourgeois Government (2014-2019) provided a legal framework and financial incentives for municipalities to consider merging. This led 15 Flemish municipalities to merge into seven, decreasing the total number of Flemish municipalities from 308 to 300. Their municipal councils were elected in the regular elections of 14 October 2018, and the change took effect on 1 January 2019.

== Municipal organization ==
=== Mayor ===
The mayor (Dutch: burgemeester; French: bourgmestre; German: Bürgermeister) is not only the head of the municipality but also the representative of the regional and the federal government at the local level. In that capacity, they are responsible for the execution of laws, decrees, ordinances and orders. The mayor is also responsible for the maintenance of public order in their municipality. They chair the college of mayor and aldermen or the municipal college, depending on the region, as well.

In the Flanders and Brussels, the mayor is appointed by the regional government, on the nomination of the municipal council, for a term of office of six years. In Wallonia, the mayor is the municipal councillor who received the largest number of preferential votes of the majority party that received the largest number of votes in the municipal elections. Hence, it is also possible that the mayor is not a member of the largest party, as the largest party is not always part of the governing coalition. It is also possible in Wallonia for the municipal council to adopt a constructive motion of no confidence in the municipal college.

=== College ===
The executive organ of the municipality is known as the college of mayor and aldermen (Dutch: college van burgemeester en schepenen; French: collège des bourgmestre et échevins), commonly referred to as the college of aldermen (Dutch: schepencollege; French: collège échevinal), in Flanders and Brussels, and as the municipal college (French: collège communal; German: gemeindekollegium) in Wallonia. This college is responsible for the daily administration of the municipality. It is also responsible for the preparation and implementation of the decisions of the municipal council.

=== Council ===
The municipal council (Dutch: gemeenteraad; French: conseil communal; German: Gemeinderat) is the representative assembly of the municipality and consists of members directly elected for a term of office of six years. The number of municipal councillors depends on the number of inhabitants of the municipality, and can vary from 7 to 55. It is responsible for all matters that are of municipal interest.

== Differences between the regions ==
Following the Fifth State Reform in 2001, the responsibility for the composition, the organization, the competences and the activities of the municipal institutions were devolved to the regions, as well as the responsibility for the provincial institutions. As a result, there are several differences between the municipal institutions in Flanders, in Wallonia and in Brussels. Wallonia has also further devolved part of its responsibilities to the German-speaking Community with regard to its 9 municipalities.

The three regions can amend or replace the existing legislation on the municipalities, most notably the New Municipal Law. In the Flanders, the Municipal Decree of 15 July 2005 applies. In Wallonia the Code of Local Democracy and Decentralization applies. In Brussels several provisions of the New Municipal Law have been modified by ordinance, such as the Ordinance of 17 July 2003. The legal framework in the three regions is still relatively similar, but that could change in the future.

== Agglomerations and federations ==
Since 1970, the Belgian Constitution includes the possibility to create agglomerations and federations of municipalities by law. This possibility was only used once in 1971 when the Brussels Agglomeration, comprising the 19 municipalities of Brussels, was put into place. It de facto ceased to exist in 1989 when the organs of the Brussels-Capital Region were established. The only election ever held for the Brussels Agglomeration council took place on 21 November 1971, reflecting the limited use of this constitutional institution before it was replaced by regional bodies.

== See also ==
- Communities, regions and language areas of Belgium
- List of Belgian municipalities by population
- List of cities in Belgium
- Municipalities with language facilities
- Provinces of Belgium
- Public Centre for Social Welfare (CPAS, OCMW)
