= Decree (Belgium) =

In Belgium, a decree (Dutch: decreet, French: décret) is a form of legislation passed by community or regional parliaments, except by the Brussels Parliament.

Decrees have the same legal force as laws, which can only be passed by the Federal Parliament. Even more, unlike other federal states, no hierarchy exists between (federal) laws and (community or regional) decrees, as each entity is supposed to have clearly defined subject-matter jurisdiction. The only difference is in terminology (and naturally in territorial applicability, as decrees are only valid in the jurisdiction of the parliament that passed it).

The following five legislative assemblies have the power to pass decrees:

- The Flemish Parliament and the Parliament of the French Community, being the parliaments of the two main communities, directly by virtue of Art. 127-129 of the Constitution
- the Parliament of the German-speaking Community, directly by virtue of Art. 130 of the Constitution
- the regional assemblies referred to in Art. 39 of the Constitution, being de facto the Walloon Parliament only, as the Flemish regional matters are exercised by the Flemish (Community) Parliament, and as Brussels is a separately organised matter (with ordinances instead of decrees). The power to pass decrees for regional assemblies is only indirectly granted by the Special Law on Institutional Reform of 1980, and is referred to as the "rules meant in Art. 134" in the Constitution.
- the Assembly of the French Community Commission, which is informally known as the Brussels Francophone Parliament. Both Communities (Flemish and French) may transfer legislative powers to their Commissions in Brussels, but only the French Community has done this. The Flemish counterpart, the Council of the Flemish Community Commission, does not have the power to pass decrees and remains under full control of the Flemish Parliament. Instead, it legislates by regulation.

This power was introduced in the first state reform in 1970, to the then-established Dutch and French cultural councils, the precursors to the present-day parliaments of the two main communities.

Unlike laws, decrees are not subject to royal assent. Decrees are not signed and promulgated by the king but instead are promulgated by the executive body, being the community or regional government or, in the case of the Brussels Francophone Parliament, the College of the French Community Commission. Decrees and ordinances are published in the Belgian Official Journal. Unlike ordinances, decrees are not subject to judicial review or to supervision by the federal government. The Constitutional Court is however responsible for supervising the division of power between the federal state, the communities and regions and may annul laws, decrees and ordinances.

Variants of decrees:

- Special decrees exist equivalent to special laws: such legislation requires a two-thirds majority in parliament and is required for certain matters (mostly relating to education and institutional matters).
- Multiple of the above-mentioned entities may adopt a joint decree (nl. gezamenlijk decreet, fr. décret conjoint), which is a decree approved by multiple entities and applying to each of them. This cooperation mechanism is possible per article 92bis/1 of the Special Law on Institutional Reform, introduced in 2014 as part of the sixth state reform. The first such decree was the joint decree of the Walloon Region and the French Community of 19 July 2017 regarding an open data policy.

Additionally, there are three historical forms of legislation called decrees:

- Decrees adopted under French rule (1792–1815), such as the 1791 "Allarde Decree".
- Decrees adopted by the constitutive National Congress of Belgium (1830–31), such as the decree of 24 November 1830 eternally excluding the House of Orange-Nassau of any power in Belgium.
- Colonial decrees governing Belgian Congo (1908–1960), issued by Belgium's executive branch as authorised by law of 18 October 1908.

== See also ==
- Ordinance (Belgium)
- Regulation (Brussels)
