= List of Belgian provinces by Human Development Index =

Map of Belgian provinces by Human Development Index in 2017. Legend: > 0.930 0.930–0.920 0.920–0.900 0.900–0.880 < 0.880

This is a list of Belgian provinces and the Region of Brussels by Human Development Index as of 2023.

Rank	Province	HDI (2023)
Very high human development
1	Antwerp	0.966
2	Brussels	0.961
3	Walloon Brabant	0.957
3	Flemish Brabant	0.957
5	East Flanders	0.955
-	Belgium (average)	0.951
6	West Flanders	0.948
7	Limburg	0.946
8	Namur	0.920
9	Liège	0.916
10	Luxembourg	0.911
11	Hainaut	0.903

== See also ==
- List of Belgian provinces by GDP
