= Gaëtan Van Goidsenhoven =

Belgian politician (born 1973)

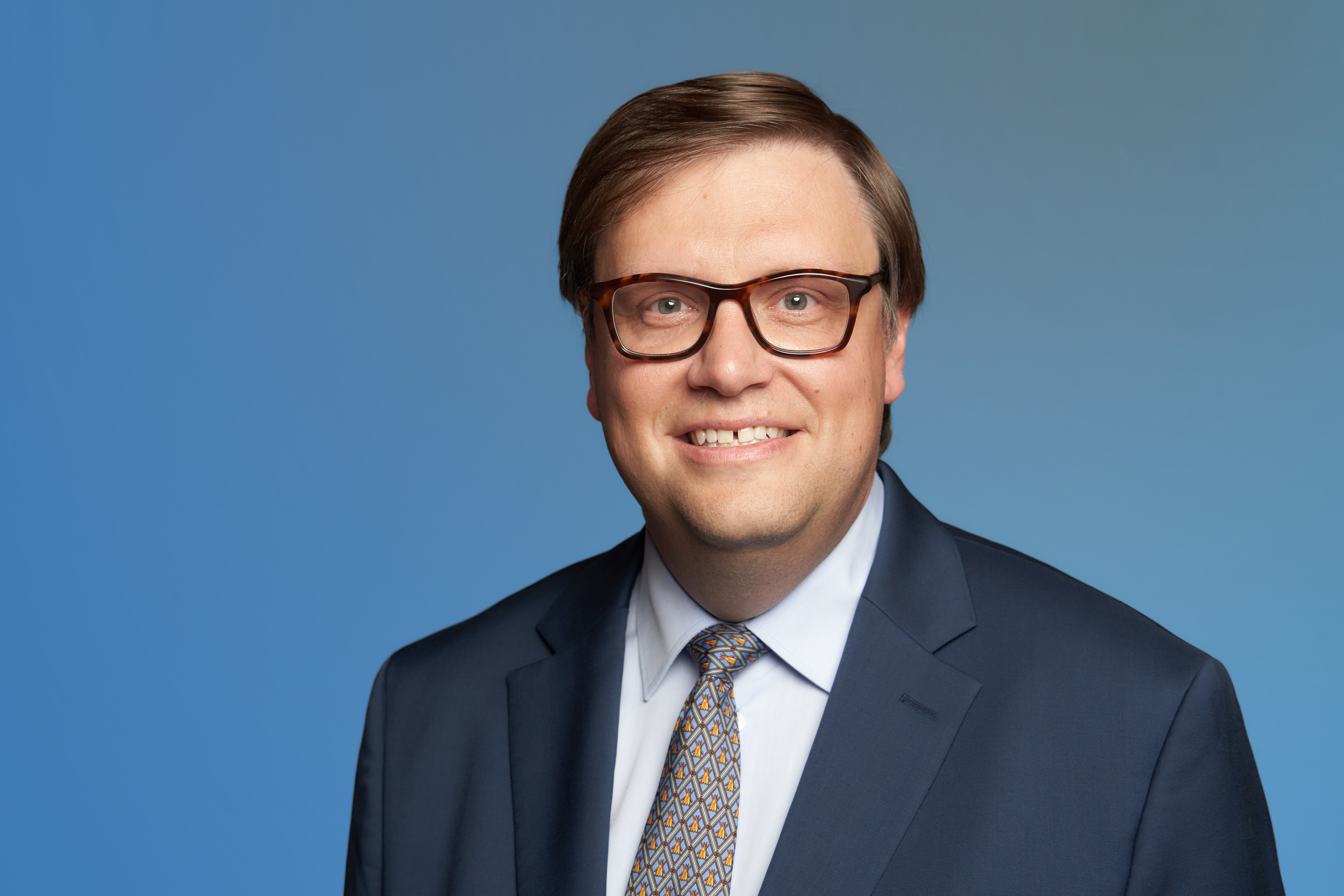

Mayor of Anderlecht
- In office 2007–2012

Member of the Parliament of the Brussels-Capital Region
- Incumbent
- Assumed office June 7, 2009

Personal details
- Born: October 2, 1973 (age 53) Uccle, Belgium
- Party: Reformist Movement
- Education: Université libre de Bruxelles
- Occupation: Politician

Gaëtan Van Goidsenhoven (born October 2, 1973, in Uccle, Belgium) is a Belgian francophone politician and a member of the MR (Mouvement Réformateur).

He served as the Mayor of Anderlecht from 2007 to 2012 and is currently a member of the Brussels Parliament, a representative in the French Community Parliament, and the president of the MR group in the Senate.

== Biography ==
Gaëtan Van Goidsenhoven was born in Uccle on October 2, 1973. He spent his childhood and completed his education in Anderlecht.

In 1997, he graduated with a degree in history from the Université libre de Bruxelles.

Following the start of his career as a historian at the Francophone Liberal Archives, he passed a recruitment exam in 2005 for the French Community. This led to his employment as a civil servant in the Cultural Heritage Service.

Administrator of the Royal Society for the Protection of Animals Veeweyde, he became its president in December 2018. In 2022, Gaëtan Van Goidsenhoven and his party opposed ritual slaughter without stunning in order to improve animal welfare. This stance led to a citizen's call to refrain from voting for the MR (Mouvement Réformateur) in Anderlecht.

== Political career ==
Gaëtan Van Goidsenhoven began his political involvement in 1995 alongside Jacques Simonet. He followed Simonet through various political roles before becoming the President of the CPAS (Public Centre for Social Welfare) of Anderlecht in 2007.

In 2007, he was called upon to assume the mayoralty of Anderlecht following the death of Jacques Simonet. Consequently, he became the youngest mayor of the Brussels-Capital Region. He held this position until December 2012.

He became a member of the Brussels-Capital Region Parliament on June 7, 2009.

On December 3, 2012, he took an oath for his role as Deputy Mayor, responsible for Territorial Development, Urban Planning, and Sustainable Development. These responsibilities became his specialties, also at the regional level.

Following the municipal elections in October 2018, despite achieving the highest number of preferential votes in Anderlecht, the MR was relegated to the opposition.

Gaëtan Van Goidsenhoven was re-elected as a Brussels Parliament member in the regional elections on May 26, 2019.

He took the oath as a Senator on July 4, 2019, and was appointed as the MR group leader in the Senate on October 8 of the same year.

Gaëtan Van Goidsenhoven is a member of the Parliamentary Assembly of La Francophonie.

Gaëtan Van Goidsenhoven is also the president of the Space Platform of the Belgian Senate. He has initiated legislation aimed at reducing space pollution and regulating the exploitation of resources in space, among other objectives.

Since September 2016, he has been a member of the Parliament of the Walloon-Brussels Federation.
