= Brussels Parliament building =

Parliament building of the Brussels-Capital Region, Belgium

- Bâtiment du Parlement bruxellois (French); Brussels Parlementsgebouw (Dutch)
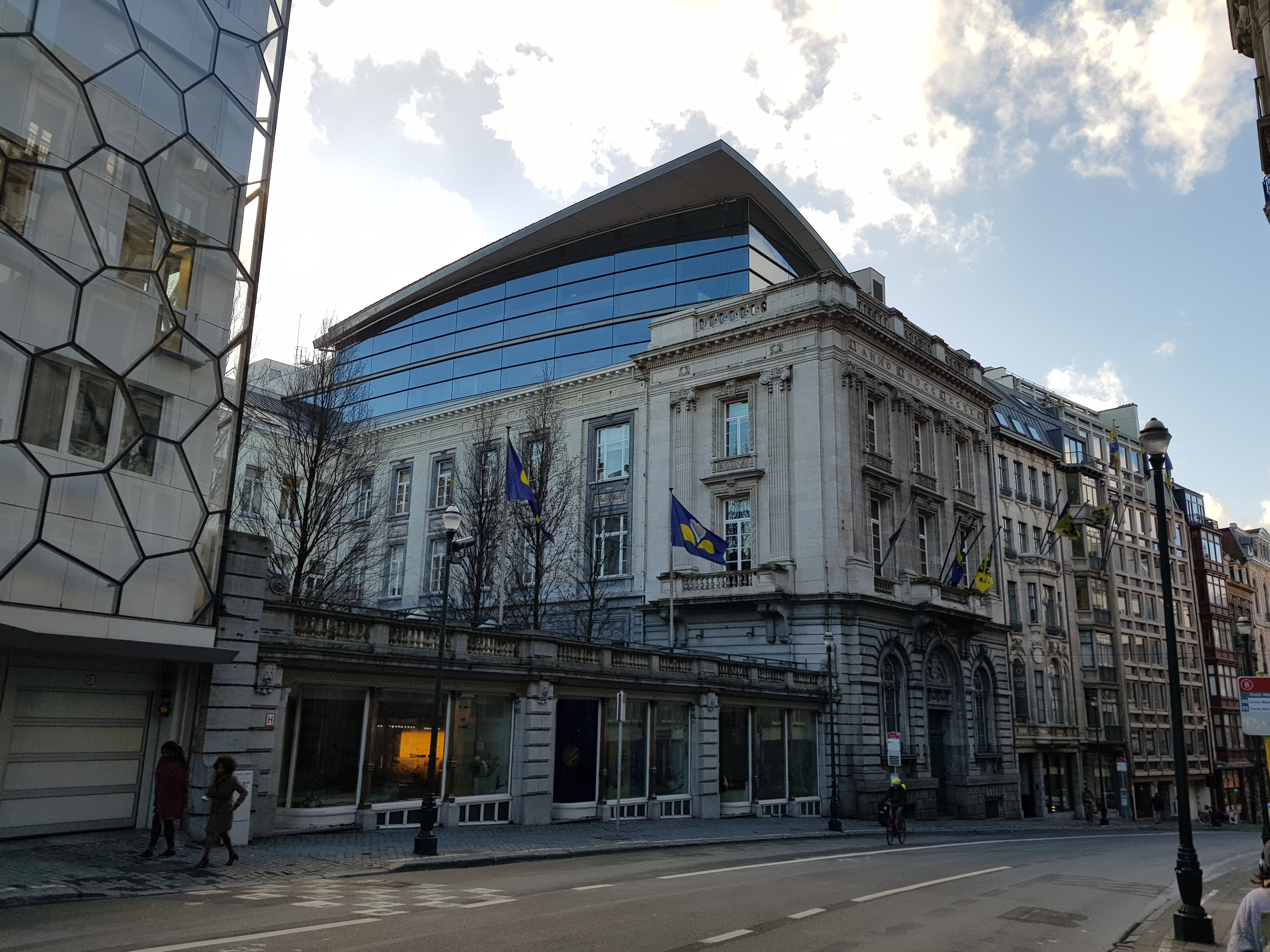
- The Brussels Parliament building seen from the Rue du Lombard/Lombardstraat
- Interactive map of the Brussels Parliament building area
- Former names: Hôtel de Limminghe

General information
- Architectural style: Neoclassical; Contemporary
- Location: Rue du Lombard / Lombardstraat 69, 1000 City of Brussels, Brussels-Capital Region, Belgium
- Coordinates: 50°50′41″N 4°21′5″E
- Current tenants: Parliament of the Brussels-Capital Region

The Brussels Parliament building (French: Bâtiment du Parlement bruxellois; Dutch: Brussels Parlementsgebouw) is a building complex in central Brussels, Belgium, housing the Parliament of the Brussels-Capital Region. The building contains the parliament's hemicycle, committee rooms, offices and other facilities. It is also used for official ceremonies and other institutional activities.

The complex incorporates the former Hôtel de Limminghe, a neoclassical mansion largely dating from the early 20th century, although some wings date back to the 17th century and later renovations, with some new construction. The site was adapted for parliamentary use in the 1990s following the establishment of the Brussels-Capital Region as a separate regional entity.

The building is located at 69, rue du Lombard/Lombardstraat, extending to the Rue du Chêne/Eikstraat, near the Place Saint-Jean/Sint-Jansplein.

== History ==
=== The Hôtel de Limminghe ===
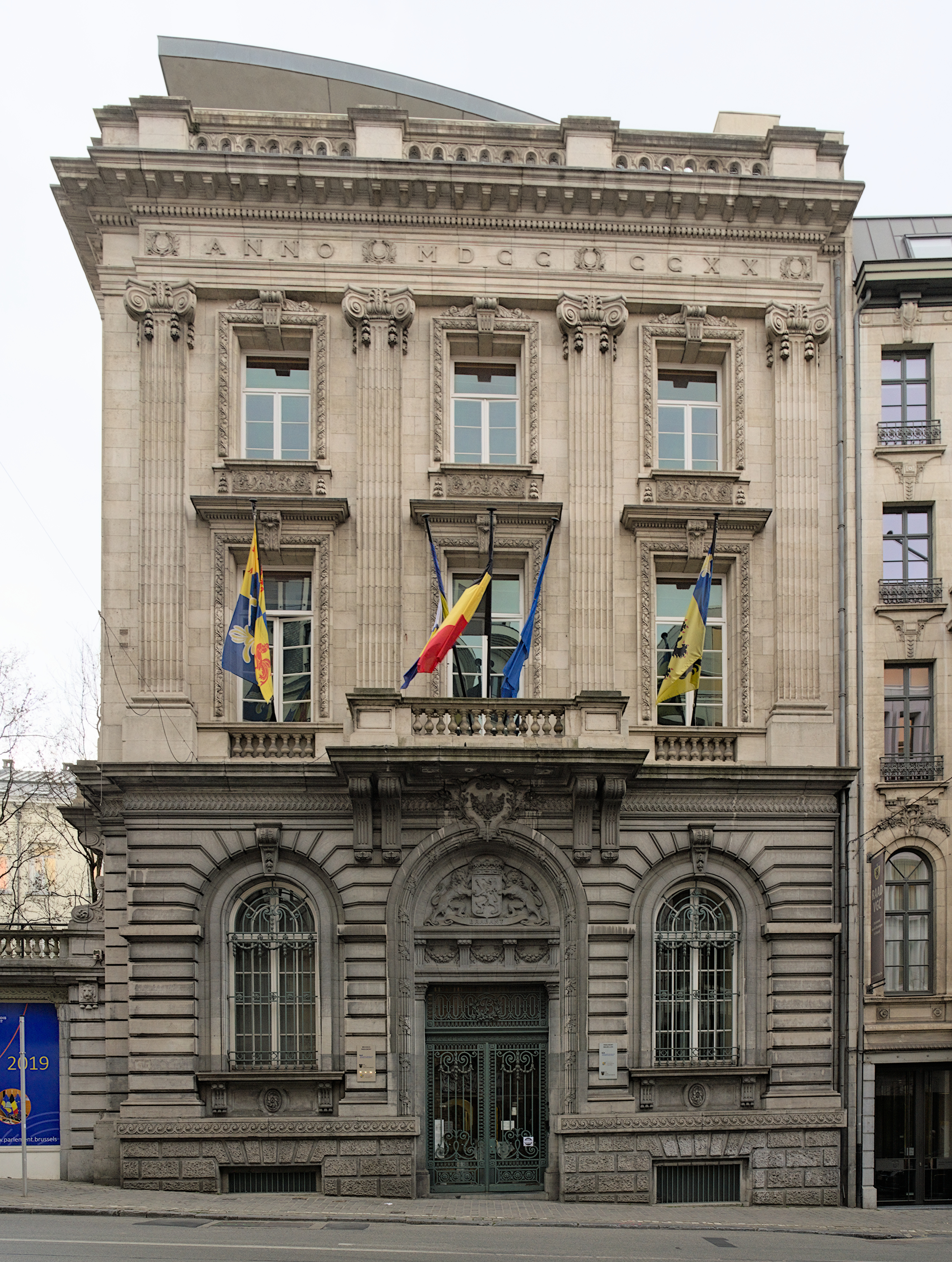
The Parliament occupies the former Hôtel de Limminghe

Towards the end of the 17th century, the site housed the Maes family's vast mansion on the Rue du Chêne/Eikstraat, which was destroyed in 1695 during the bombardment of Brussels in the War of the Grand Alliance. The remains of the mansion and its grounds were bought by the Count of Limminghe, Charles van den Berghe, who held numerous administrative posts in Brussels, being twice the city's burgomaster (later mayor). The following year, in 1696, he built another large, prestigious, two-storey mansion at the end of an enclosed courtyard with a garden (entered via Saint-Jean/Sint-Jan), which was then sold on to various figures such as the Apostolic Nuncio and the ambassador to England at the time.

The building was acquired by the state for the first time in 1823, when the Brabant Province and the Dutch government bought it to house the provincial administration and serve as the official residence of the local governor. This situation continued after Belgian independence in 1830. However, due to development of the provincial government, the building had become too small and dilapidated by the end of the 1860s. Consequently, there were successive waves of reconstruction, albeit with a planned design to ensure consistency. Modifications to the governors' residence began in 1885, and the office wing was replaced in 1907. Georges Hano, the Ministry of Public Works' then-architect, built a taller wing with direct access to the Rue de Chêne. The different buildings were also interlinked and the façades overlooking the courtyard were unified. The governors' residence was increased by one storey on the side facing the courtyard, and the height was also increased on the building surmounting the porch, which was reconstructed by Hansotte. At the start of the 20th century, the Rue du Lombard/Lombardstraat was opened up by the city and Hano desired to make the provincial government's presence felt on this new road, which his complex now bordered. In 1913, work began on a new building, completed in 1930, in a neo-Louis XVI style, with a ceremonial entrance hall and lavish decoration.

=== The Brussels Parliament building (1995–present) ===
In 1995, Brussels was split from Brabant and given its own regional government. The Federal Government gave the building to the Brussels-Capital Region, which in turn gave it to the Brussels Regional Parliament, which was searching for a seat. However, it became apparent that the building was unsuited for the role of a parliament, leading to the opening of an architectural competition later that year. The resulting changes made included increasing the height of the wing overlooking the Rue du Lombard in order to erect a new hemicycle on the top floor. This added a large, modern roof element to the building's neoclassical design. Committee rooms were fitted with modern equipment and state rooms were restored. Despite the building's renovation, the original dimensions have been retained. A multipurpose hall was also built beneath a hanging garden to create a link between the building's different sections.

== Architecture ==
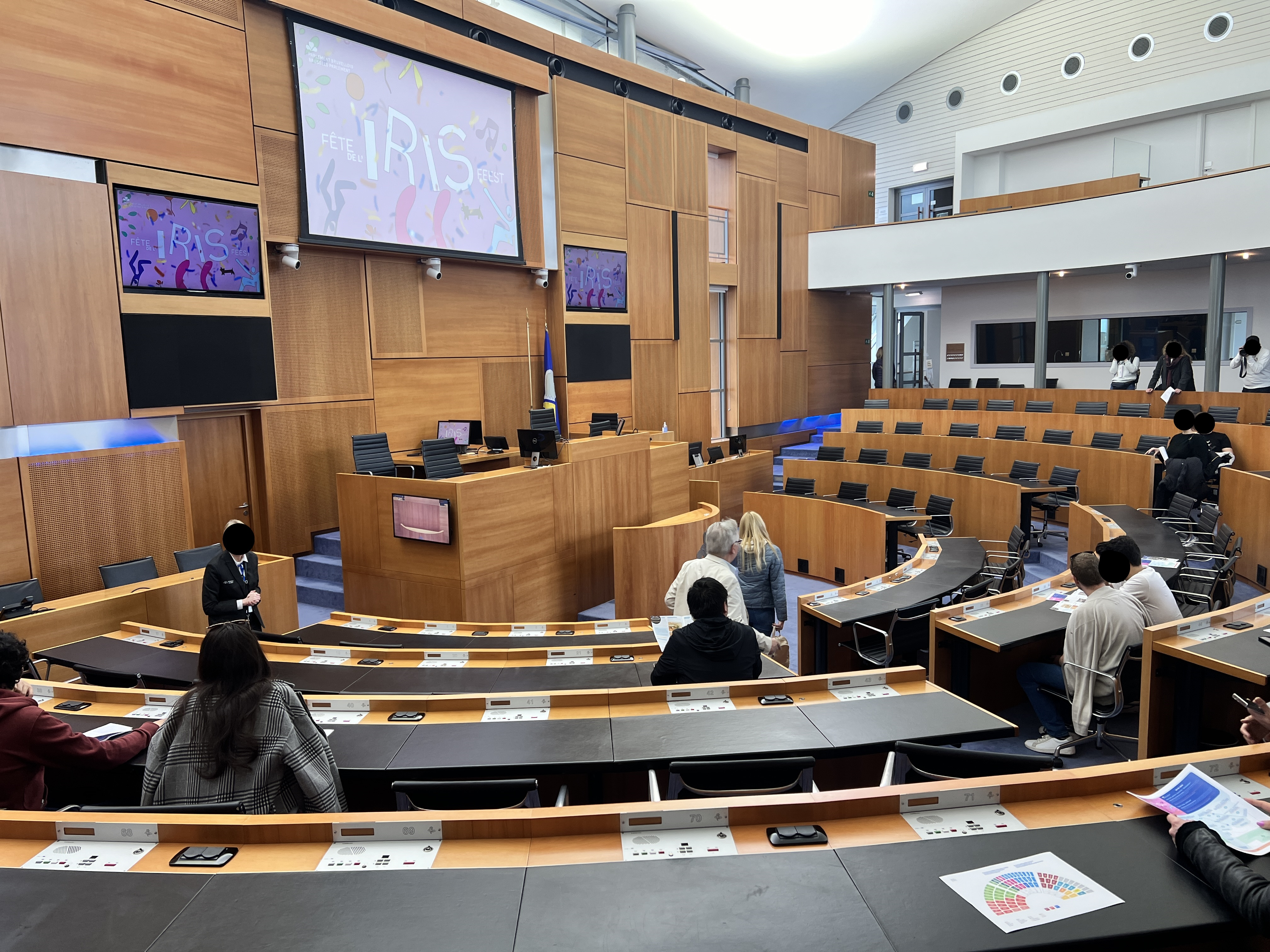
Hemicycle

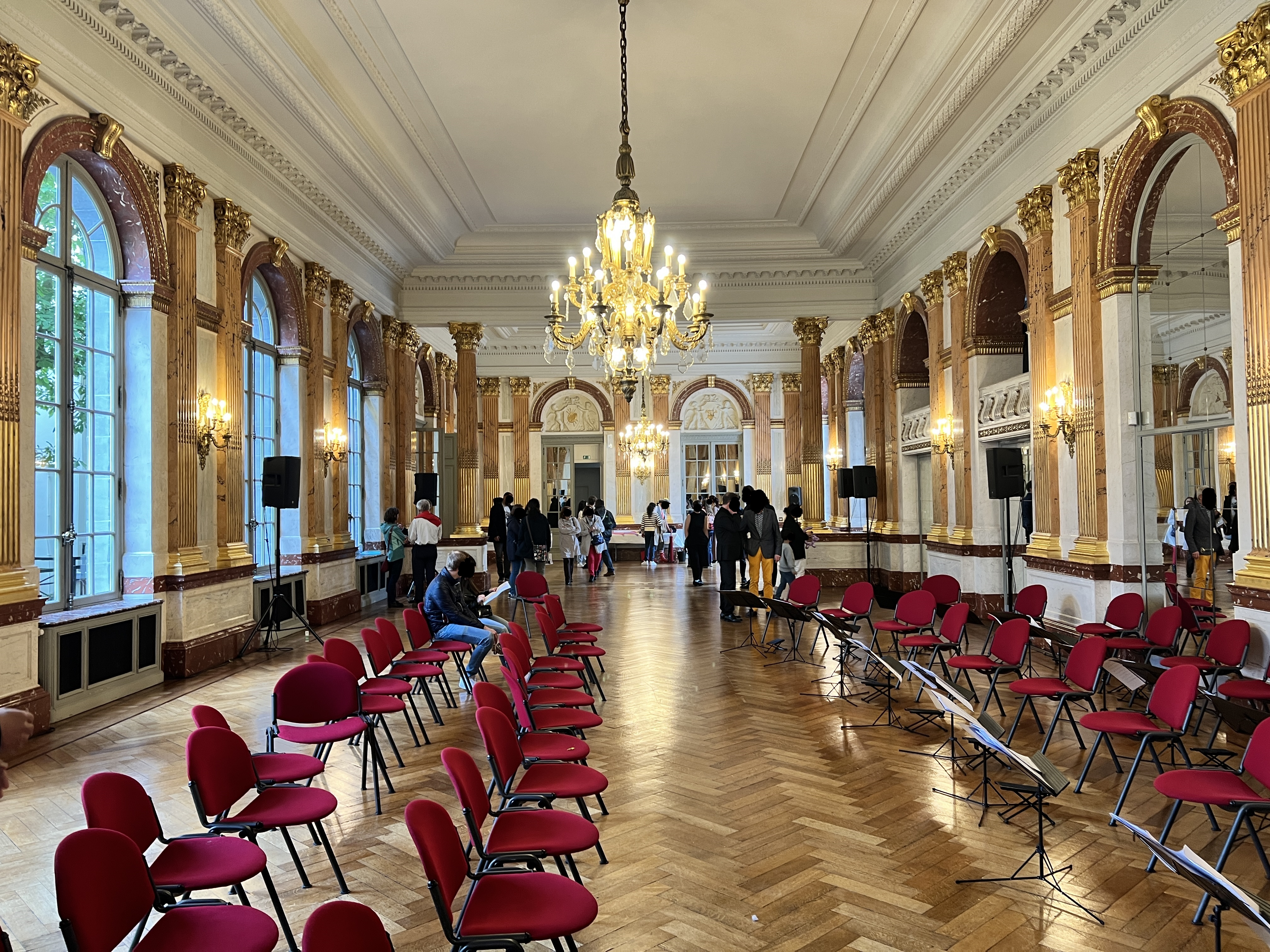
Hall of Mirrors

The parliament's hemicycle is on the top floor of the building, with the roof being of modern zinc and glass design. The chamber is encircled by a long curved wooden wall and there is an overhanging press and public gallery. Committee rooms have likewise been updated with modern technology but much of the building remains neoclassical. There is also a cafeteria and reading room for deputies. The four rear wings have administrative functions, including housing the president's offices. There is also 400 m^{2} (4,300 sq ft) of hanging gardens extending to heights of up to 27 metres (89 ft).

== Art ==
Since being taken over by the Brussels Region, the building has hosted various contemporary works of art maintained by a commission who purchase the works for the parliament. The Commission is composed of members of the Parliament Office together with eight external observers from the art world. In 1998, this commission entrusted eleven artists to create works for areas of the building:

- Yasmina Assbane for the floral kerchiefs
- Rudi Bogaerts for the artistic area dedicated to the memory of famous personalities
- Patrick Corillon for the "Three stories of Oskar Serti"
- Paul Day for terracotta high-reliefs
- Wim Delvoye for the "Love letter from Mohammed to Caroline"
- Gilbert Fastenakens for the photos transferred to canvas
- Joseph Kosuth for the illuminated frieze
- Guy Leclercq for the re-mounted canvasses
- Michel Mouffe for a set of mirrors and illuminated blocks
- Richard Venlet for the drawings of the electrical installations
- Julien Willem for the Brussels portrait gallery

== See also ==
- Neoclassical architecture in Belgium
- History of Brussels
- Belgium in the long nineteenth century
