= Jef Van Damme =

Belgian politician (born 1979)

Member of the Parliament of the Brussels-Capital Region
- Incumbent
- Assumed office 7 June 2009

Personal details
- Born: 8 January 1979 (age 47) Ghent
- Party: Socialistische Partij Anders
- Education: University of Antwerp; Université catholique de Louvain; King's College London

Jef Van Damme (born 8 January 1979) has been a Member of the Parliament of the Brussels-Capital Region for the Socialistische Partij Anders since 7 June 2009.

Born in Ghent, he was educated at the University of Antwerp, Université catholique de Louvain and King's College London (MA European Studies, 2003).
