= List of Belgian provinces by GDP =

This article lists Belgian provinces and regions (NUTS 2) by gross domestic product (GDP).

== By GDP ==
This table reports the gross domestic product (nominal GDP), expressed in billions of euro, of the ten provinces and the Brussels capital region in 2021.

Flemish Region Walloon Region

| Rank | Province | GDP in bn. EUR |
|---|---|---|
| 1 | Antwerp | 98,189 |
| - | Brussels | 90,459 |
| 2 | East Flanders | 62,123 |
| 3 | West Flanders | 52,323 |
| 4 | Flemish Brabant | 51,731 |
| 5 | Hainaut | 36,940 |
| 6 | Liège | 34,715 |
| 7 | Limburg | 31,766 |
| 8 | Walloon Brabant | 21,155 |
| 9 | Namur | 14,697 |
| 10 | Luxembourg | 7,887 |

== By GDP per capita ==
This table reports the gross domestic product (adjusted for purchasing power parity), expressed in euro, of the ten provinces and the Brussels capital region in 2021.

Flemish Region Walloon Region

| Rank | Province | GDP per capita in EUR |
|---|---|---|
| - | Brussels | 66,200 |
| 1 | Antwerp | 46,900 |
| 2 | Walloon Brabant | 46,500 |
| 3 | Flemish Brabant | 39,800 |
| 4 | West Flanders | 39,000 |
| 5 | East Flanders | 36,300 |
| 6 | Limburg | 32,300 |
| 7 | Liège | 28,000 |
| 8 | Namur | 26,300 |
| 9 | Hainaut | 24,600 |
| 10 | Luxembourg | 24,200 |

== See also ==
- List of Belgian provinces by Human Development Index
