= Cécile Jodogne =

Belgian politician (born 1964)

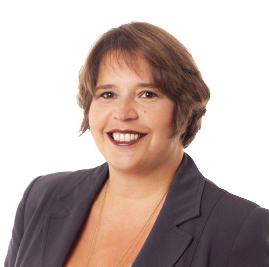

State Secretary of the Brussels-Capital Region in charge of Foreign Trade, Firefighting and Emergency Medical Assistance and Minister and Member of the Board of the French Community Commission (COCOF)

Personal details
- Born: 1 April 1964 (age 62) Leuven
- Party: FDF
- Education: Université catholique de Louvain
- Occupation: Politician

Cécile Jodogne (born 1 April 1964) is a Belgian politician. In July 2014, she was appointed State Secretary of the Brussels-Capital Region, in charge of Foreign Trade, Firefighting and Emergency Medical Assistance. She is also minister and member of the board of the French Community Commission (COCOF), in charge of Civil Service and Health Policy.

Jodogne was born in Louvain (Leuven) and has a degree in geography and economics (UCL). After graduation, she worked in education (university and secondary school). She then specialized in urban studies and mobility. Her political involvement began early. She became a member of the FDF (Fédéralistes Démocrates Francophones) in 1985. In the early 1990s, she became consultant for the Office of the Secretary of State for Monuments and Sites, where she was responsible for monitoring urban plans, various publications on Brussels heritage and cultural and sports policies of the COCOF. She then became Head of Office of the Deputy mayor of Schaerbeek Bernard Clerfayt, before being elected municipal councilor in Schaerbeek. At the next election, in 2006, she was appointed Deputy mayor for Urbanism, Environment, Urban Renewal, Heritage and Tourism. In 2008, she took on, in addition to this mandate, the role of acting mayor, replacing Bernard Clerfayt who was then appointed Federal Secretary of State.

In 2014, Cécile Jodogne became Secretary of State for the Brussels Region and Minister of COCOF. Despite her new role, she continues to closely monitor her municipality since she remains communal advisor in Schaerbeek. Next to her political responsibilities, she is also active in the sector of urbanism and architecture. She presides of RenovaS, an association supporting urban renewal, and the association Autrique House.

== Political mandates ==
- 2000–present: Municipal councilor in Schaerbeek
- 2006–present: Deputy mayor Schaerbeek
- 2008–2011: acting mayor of Schaerbeek.
- 2009–2014: Member of the Parliament of the Brussels Capital-Region
- 2014–present: State Secretary of the Brussels-Capital Region, in charge of Foreign Trade and Firefighting and Emergency Medical Assistance. Minister of the French Community Commission (COCOF), in charge of Civil Service and Health Policy.
