= Pogge (folk hero) =

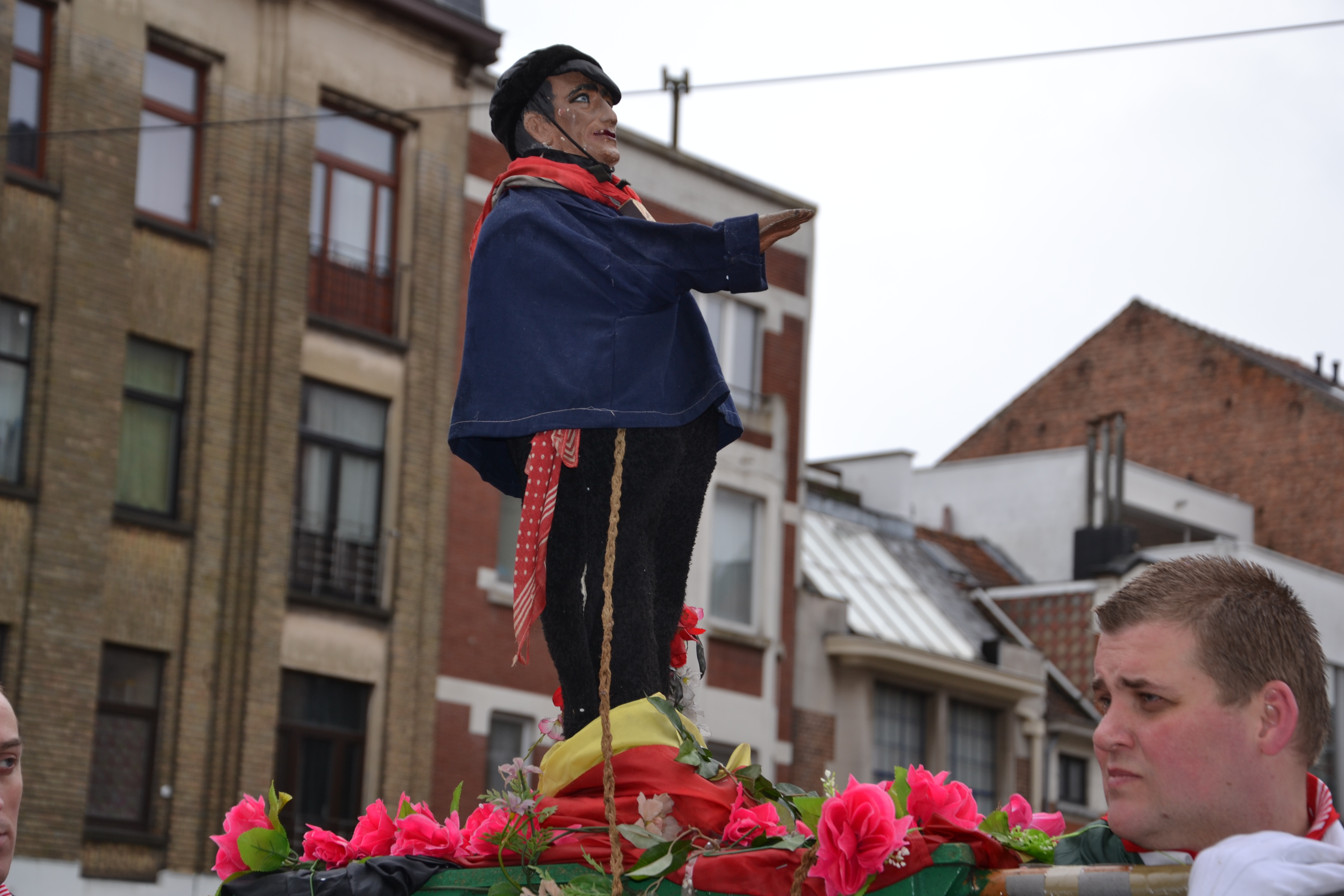
- Statue of Pogge, carried around during Scharnaval in 2014.
- Born: Pierre De Cruyer; 19 July 1821; Ternat, South Brabant, United Netherlands
- Died: 16 June 1890 (aged 68); Brussels, Brabant, Belgium
- Citizenship: United Kingdom of the Netherlands (1821–1830); Belgium (1830–1890)
- Spouse: Anne-Catherine Crabs (m. 1853; died 1883)
- Children: 5

Pierre De Cruyer (19 July 1821 – 16 June 1890), better known as Pogge, was a Belgian soldier and day labourer.

== Life ==
Pierre De Cruyer was born on 19 July 1821 in Ternat. He grew up in modest circumstances and joined the army in 1842, serving in the 21st Betallion of the 11th Infantry Regiment. His military career was short-lived, ending in 1846, and was marked by a lack of dedication, frequent absences and excessive drinking.

In 1853, he moved to Schaerbeek and married Anne-Catherine Crabs, originally from Diegem, at St. Servatius’ Church. The couple had five children, four of whom died at a young age. Only the second, also named Pierre, survived. The family lived in a modest single-storey house on the site now occupied by 392–394 Haachtsesteenweg/Chaussée de Haecht.

Pogge worked for many years as a day labourer for this neighbour, Van den Eynde, whose father-in-law was reportedly Jean Parici, a regular drinking companion of Pogge. After the death of De Cruyer's wife in 1883, he became a frequent visitor to local estaminets. There he regularly drank gueuze or faro, often in Jean Parici's company. Thanks to his honesty, loyalty and likeable character, De Cruyer was much loved by the residents of Schaerbeek, who often sought his advice. De Cruyer developed a habit of consistently expressing his viewpoint with the phrase: “Alles es Just.”

De Cruyer died on 16 June 1890 in a care home on Rue Haute/Hoogstraat in Brussels.

== Legacy ==
- Line 92 of the Brussels tram has a stop called ‘Pogge’ near a public square known as ‘Place Pogge/Poggeplein’.
- Since 2013, the heritage festival ‘Alles es Just!’ has been held, named after his famous saying.
- On 8 September 2017, a memorial in his honour was unveiled in Josaphat Park.
