= Ordinance (Belgium) =

In Belgium, an ordinance (Dutch: ordonnantie; French: ordonnance) is a form of legislation passed by the Brussels Parliament in exercise of its regional competences and by the United Assembly of the Common Community Commission. In principle, ordinances have the same legal force as laws and decrees, but the Federal Government has the authority to suspend ordinances if, in its view, it could jeopardise the role of Brussels as the capital of Belgium or the international role of Brussels, sometimes seen as the "capital of the European Union".

== See also ==
- Regulation (Brussels)
- Decree (Belgium)
