= French Community Commission =

French Community representation in Brussels

Flag

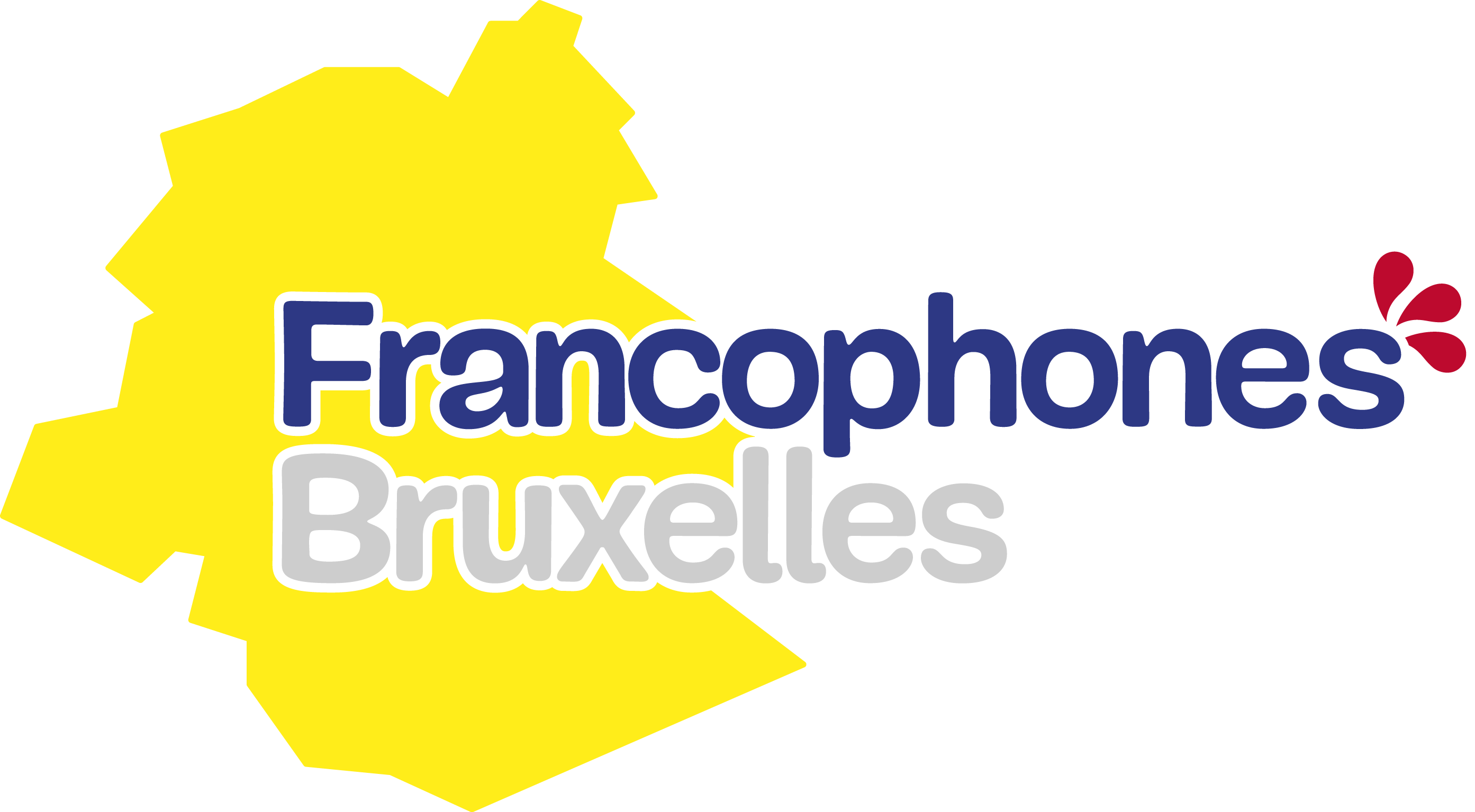
Logo

The French Community Commission (French: Commission communautaire française (COCOF)) is the local representative of the French-speaking authorities in the Brussels-Capital Region, one of the three regions of Belgium.

== History ==
The community commissions of Brussels were created in 1989 during the third state reform. On January 1, 1994, the French Community transferred certain responsibilities to the French Community Commission empowering it to act independently of the French Community in those competencies transferred.

On 3 December 2001, the Assemblée de la Commission communautaire française or ACCF (Assembly of the French Community Commission) informally changed its name to Parlement francophone bruxellois (French-speaking Brussels Parliament).

== Description ==
The political institutions of the community commission include its Parliament, which is currently presided over by Bertin Mampaka Mankamba, and its Government, headed up by Barbara Trachte.

Unlike the Flemish Community Commission which only has the powers to pass regulations, the French Community Commission has been granted legislative power in some areas (such as tourism and healthcare) by the French Community and thus has to power to enact decrees independent of the Parliament of the French Community.

Blazon: Quartered, the I and IV Wallonia, the II and III Brussels-Capital Region.

== See also ==
- Brussels Parliament
- French Community of Belgium
- Common Community Commission
- Flemish Community Commission (VGC)
