= Flemish Community Commission =

Representative of Flemish authorities in the Brussels-Capital region

Flag

The Flemish Community Commission (Dutch: Vlaamse Gemeenschapscommissie (VGC)) is the local representative of the Flemish authorities in the Brussels-Capital Region, one of the three regions of Belgium. The VGC depends on the Flemish Parliament, and its council is made up by the members of the Dutch linguistic group of the Brussels Parliament, whereas its executive is made up of the two Flemish ministers and the Flemish secretary of the Brussels-Capital Government.

The VGC was established by the special (constitutional) law of 12 January 1989.

The VGC has competencies for cultural, educational, well-being and health for Flemings in Brussels. It reaches an estimated 200,000 inhabitants of Brussels with its services, mostly Dutch-speakers, and a significant number of migrants. However, several of these competencies are rather limited in practice, e.g. it has not the slightest authority for hospitals.

Strictly legally speaking, the VGC is only competent for institutions depending on the Flemish government, and not for individual citizens. This was a consequence of the fact that no formal Flemish citizenship was established. The VGC is the successor of the Nederlandse Commissie voor de Cultuur van de Brusselse agglomeratie (NCC) (in Dutch), established in 1971. The VGC also assumed all Flemish community-specific responsibilities in Brussels of the former province of Brabant when it was split up.

It does not have legislative power contrary to the other two community commissions. The French equivalent may adopt decrees and the Common Community Commission may adopt ordinances, which both have force of law.

== See also ==
- Brussels Parliament
- Common Community Commission
- French Community Commission (COCOF)
