= Common Community Commission =

The Common Community Commission (French: Commission communautaire commune; Dutch: Gemeenschappelijke Gemeenschapscommissie) is responsible for Brussels community matters that are common to both the French Community and the Flemish Community and for institutions that fall within the competencies of the Communities but do not belong exclusively to either Community in the Brussels-Capital Region of Belgium. Examples of this include the bilingual hospitals in the Brussels Region.

The primary responsibilities of the Common Community Commission are health policy (curative and preventive medicine) and assistance to individuals (protection of youth, social welfare, aid to families, immigrant assistance services, etc.).

The Common Community Commission is composed of a council, the United Assembly, and an executive, the United College. The United Assembly consists of the members of both the Council of the Flemish Community Commission and the Assembly of the French Community Commission, and is equal to the membership of the Brussels Parliament (which is a regional, rather than a community parliament). The United College comprises all members of the Government of the Brussels-Capital Region, except the Secretaries of State. The United College is presided over by the Minister-President of the Brussels Region, who only has an advisory vote. As a result, there are two French-speaking and two Flemish members with the right to vote.

The United Assembly can legislate by ordinance. In order to adopt an ordinance, a majority of its members must be present and an absolute majority of the votes cast must be in favour. However, there also must be a majority in each of the two language groups.

== See also ==
- Brussels Parliament
- Flemish Community Commission
- French Community Commission
