= Parliament of the Brussels-Capital Region =

Regional parliament of Belgium

Coordinates: 50°50′41″N 4°21′5″E

Parliament of the
Brussels-Capital Region
(in official languages)
French	Parlement de la Région de Bruxelles-Capitale
Dutch	Parlement van het Brussels Hoofdstedelijk Gewest

Type
- Type: Unicameral

Leadership
- Speaker: Bertin Mampaka Mankamba, MR since 25 June 2024

Structure
- Seats: 89; 72 in the French language group 17 in the Dutch language group
- Political groups: Government (55): MR (20); PS (18); LE (8); Groen (4); Vooruit (2); Anders (2); CD&V (1); Opposition (34): PVDA-PTB (15); Ecolo (7); DéFI (4); Team Fouad Ahidar (3); N-VA (2); VB (1); Independent (2)
- Length of term: 5 years

Elections
- Last election: 9 June 2024
- Next election: 2029

Meeting place
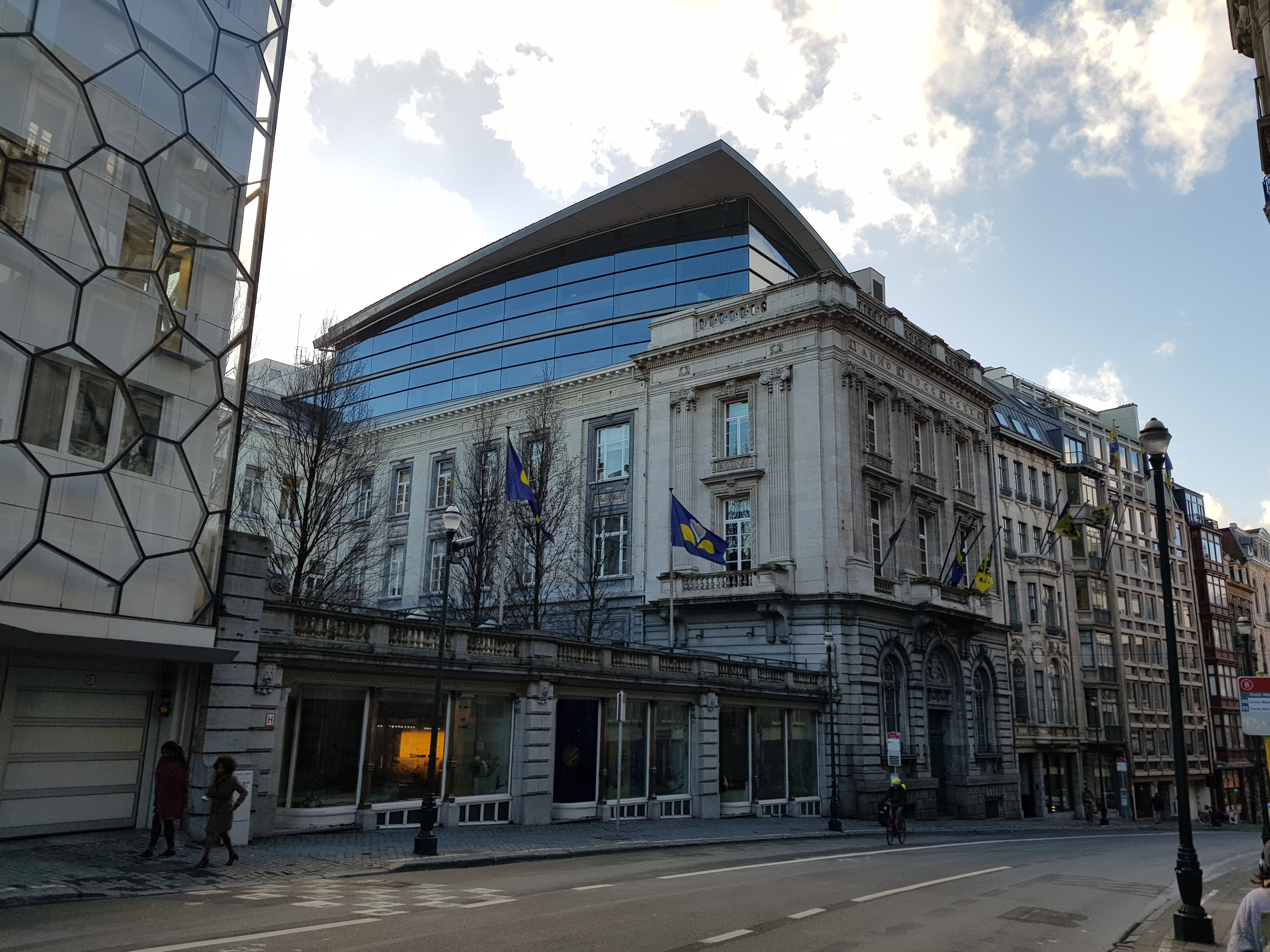
- Brussels Parliament building

Website
- http://www.parlbruparl.irisnet.be/

The Parliament of the Brussels-Capital Region (French: Parlement de la Région de Bruxelles-Capitale; Dutch: Parlement van het Brussels Hoofdstedelijk Gewest) is the governing body of the Brussels-Capital Region, one of the three federated regions of Belgium. It is also known as the Brussels Regional Parliament (French: Parlement régional bruxellois; Dutch: Brussels Hoofdstedelijk Parlement), or simply the Brussels Parliament (French: Parlement bruxellois; Dutch: Brussels Parlement).

== History ==
The Council of the Brussels-Capital Region (French: Conseil de la région de Bruxelles-Capitale, Dutch: Raad van het Brussels Hoofdstedelijk Gewest) was established with the creation of the region in 1989, on the occasion of the third state reform. Unlike its Flemish and Walloon regional counterparts, whose regional parliaments were initially composed of those members of the Belgian Federal Parliament elected in their respective regions, the Brussels Council was immediately elected by direct universal suffrage. Initially, it had 75 deputies, divided between 64 French-speaking and 11 Dutch-speaking members. A reform in 2001, applicable from 2004, increased this number to 89, divided between 72 French-speakers and 17 Dutch-speakers.

On 25 February 2005, a revision of the Belgian Constitution to the special law relating to regional and community institutions, which came into force on 11 March 2006, followed by an amendment on 11 April 2006, transformed the Council into the Parliament of the Brussels-Capital Region (French: Parlement de la Région de Bruxelles-Capitale, Dutch: Parlement van het Brussels Hoofdstedelijk Gewest).

== Functions ==
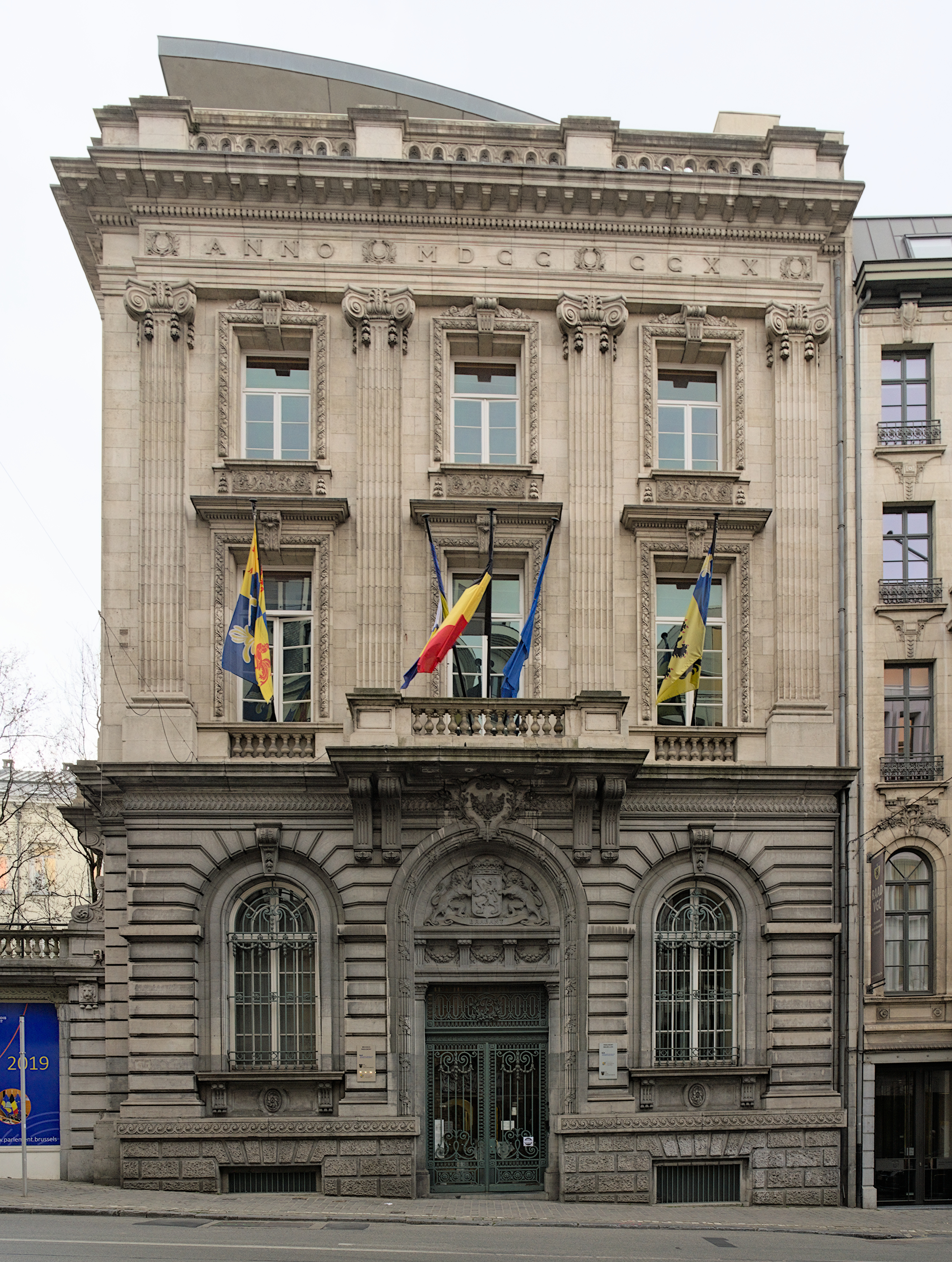
The Parliament occupies the former Hôtel de Limminghe on the Rue du Lombard/Lombardstraat, Brussels

The Brussels Parliament role mainly consists in controlling the government of the Brussels-Capital Region, approving the budget and creating and passing legislation in regional matters, known as ordinances, which are legally binding. One of its first tasks after the Parliament is renewed is appointing five ministers and three regional secretaries of state, who together form the cabinet of the Brussels-Capital Region.

The Brussels Parliament can also force the cabinet as a whole or one or more of its members to resign by passing a motion of no confidence. However, because the Parliament cannot be dissolved prior to the end of its five-year term, such a motion is only admissible if it is a constructive motion, in other words, the Parliament must decide upon a successor to the cabinet or to one or more of its members.

The 89 members of the Brussels Parliament are divided into two language groups: 72 belong to the French-speaking group and 17 members belong to the Dutch-speaking group. The members of the French-speaking group also make up the Parlement francophone bruxellois (English: Francophone Brussels Parliament), which was formerly known as the Assembly of the French Community Commission, while the members of the Dutch-speaking group make up the Council of the Flemish Community Commission. The Parlement francophone bruxellois and the Council of the Flemish Community Commission together form the United Assembly of the Common Community Commission. The Community Commissions are to a certain extent responsible for Community competencies within the Brussels-Capital Region.

19 of the 72 French-speaking members of the Brussels Parliament are also members of the Parliament of the French Community of Belgium, and until 2004 this was also the case for six Dutch-speaking members, who were at the same time members of the Flemish Parliament. Nowadays, people voting for a Flemish party have to vote separately for six directly-elected members of the Flemish Parliament.

Due to the multiple capacities of single members, there are members of the Brussels Parliament who are simultaneously members of the Parliament of the French Community of Belgium and of the Senate as "community senators" for the French Community. At the moment, this is the case for François Roelants du Vivier (MR), Amina Derbaki Sbaï (PS) and Sfia Bouarfa (PS). However, there are certain restrictions in place in order to prevent one person from combining too many mandates. For instance, it is not possible to be a member of the Chamber of Representatives and of one of the Regional Parliaments at the same time.

== Elections ==
Elections of 75 Brussels regional deputies, 89 since 2004, take place every five years. Here is the list of past regional elections:

- 18 June 1989 (first elections)
- 21 May 1995, coincided with the federal legislative elections;
- 13 June 1999, coincided with the European Parliament election;
- 13 June 2004, coincided with the European Parliament election;
- 7 June 2009, coincided with the European Parliament election;
- 25 May 2014 coincided with the European Parliament election;
- 26 May 2019, coincided with the European Parliament election;
- 9 June 2024, coincided with the European Parliament election

=== Current composition ===
The composition of the Brussels Parliament is as follows:

French language group					Dutch language group				
Party		Members			Party		Members		
Party		last election	current	+/−	Party		last election	current	+/−
•	Reformist Movement	20	20	Steady	•	Groen	4	4	Steady
•	Socialist Party	16	17	▲1		Team Fouad Ahidar	3	3	Steady
	Workers' Party of Belgium	15	14	▼1		New Flemish Alliance	2	2	Steady
•	Les Engagés	8	8	Steady	•	Anders	2	2	Steady
	Ecolo	7	7	Steady		Flemish Interest	2	1	▼1
	DéFI	6	4	▼2	•	Vooruit	2	2	Steady
	Independent	–	2	▲2		Workers' Party of Belgium	1	1	Steady
					•	Christian Democratic and Flemish	1	1	Steady
						Independent	–	1	▲1
Total:		72	72	Steady	Total:		17	17	Steady
Total: 89 Members
A dot means: participating in the Brussels government.

== Previous compositions ==
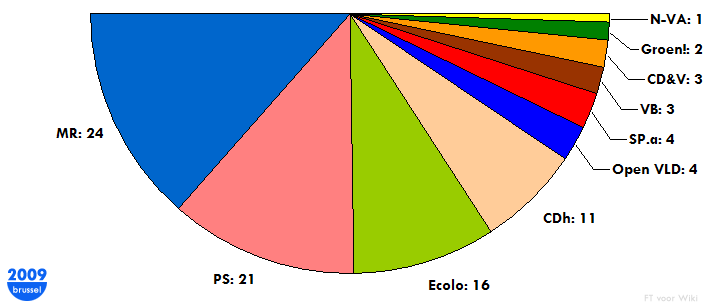

2004–2009

1	7	3	26	3	10	4	24	6	4
Groen	Ecolo	SP.A + Spirit	PS	CD&V + N-VA	CDH	Open VLD + Vivant	MR	VB	FN

2009–2014

2	16	4	21	3	11	4	24	1	3
Groen	Ecolo	SP.A	PS	CD&V	CDH	Open VLD	MR	N-VA	VB

2014–2019

4	3	8	3	21	3	9	5	18	12	3	1
PTB/PVDA	Groen	Ecolo	SP.A	PS	CD&V	CDH	Open VLD	MR	FDF	N-VA	VB

2019–2024

1	1	11	4	15	3	17	1	6	3	13	10	3	1
Dier Animal	Agora	PTB/PVDA	Groen	Ecolo	one.brussels-sp.a	PS	CD&V	CDH	Open VLD	MR	DéFI	N-VA	VB

2024–present

3	15	4	7	2	17	1	8	2	20	4	2	1	3
Team Fouad Ahidar	PTB(14)/PVDA(1)	Groen	Ecolo	Vooruit	PS	CD&V	LES ENGAGÉS	Open VLD	MR	DéFI	N-VA	VB	Ind.

== See also ==
- Belgian Federal Parliament (federal assembly – upper and lower houses)
- Flemish Parliament (regional and community assembly)
- Walloon Parliament (regional assembly)
- Parliament of the French-speaking Community (community assembly)
- Parliament of the German-speaking Community (community assembly)
- French Community Commission (COCOF)
- Flemish Community Commission (VGC)
