= Robert Mallet-Stevens =

French architect and designer (1886–1945)

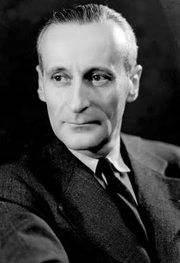
- Born: Robert André Mallet; 24 February 1886; 8th arrondissement of Paris, France
- Died: 8 February 1945 (aged 58); Paris, France
- Resting place: Passy Cemetery
- Education: École Spéciale d'Architecture
- Occupations: Architect; designer; production designer; professor
- Spouse(s): Alice Kahn Mallet (m. 1912, divorced) Andrée Rose Léon
- Relatives: Marie-Louise Carven (sister-in-law); Adolphe Stoclet (uncle); Georges Hébert (uncle); Jean Hébert-Stevens (cousin); Arthur "Graham" Stevens (grandfather); Alfred Stevens (great-uncle); Joseph Stevens (great-uncle)
- Buildings: Villa Cavrois; Villa Noailles

Academic work
- Institutions: École des beaux-arts de Lille

Robert Mallet-Stevens (née Mallet; 24 March 1886 – 8 February 1945) was a French architect, designer, production designer and professor. A retrospective of Mallet-Stevens' work was held by Centre Pompidou in 2005.

== Early life ==
Robert André Mallet was born on 24 February 1886 in the 8th arrondissement of Paris to Maurice André Mallet, an art trader and paintings expert, and Juliette Léopoldine Joséphine Amyuthe Lucie Catherine Anaïs Stevens.

Through his mother Mallet-Stevens was a member of Brussels Stevens family, and was the grandson of the art dealer Arthur "Graham" Stevens, and the nephew of Adolphe Stoclet and Georges Hébert. Mallet-Stevens was also the great-nephew of the painters Alfred Stevens and Joseph Stevens, and the cousin of the painter and stained-glass artist Jean Hébert-Stevens. Mallet-Stevens' father and grandfather were art collectors in Paris and Brussels.

Mallet-Stevens received his formal training at the École spéciale d'Architecture in Paris between 1903 and 1906. He was primarily interested in collaboration between different art forms according to the precepts established by Viollet le Duc who had created the school with Émile Trélat in 1865. At the school he wrote Guerande about relationships between the different forms of art.

== Career ==
In 1924, Mallet-Stevens published a magazine called La Gazette Des 7 Arts and at the same time with the help of Ricciotto Canudo founded the Club des amis du 7ème art. A Paris street in the 16th arrondissement, Rue Mallet-Stevens, was built by him in the 1920s and has on it six houses designed by him.

A portfolio of 32 of Mallet-Stevens' designs was published under the title Une Cité Moderne in 1922. In addition to designing shops, factories, a fire station in Paris, apartment buildings, private homes, and interiors, he was one of the first architects to show an interest in cinema. He designed film sets and his design for Marcel L'Herbier's silent film L'Inhumaine (1924) is considered a masterpiece.

In 1923 he was commissioned by Charles de Noailles to build the Villa Noailles located on the hill of the Château d'Hyères, the first core of which was completed in 1925 and whose extensions followed one another until 1933. "It is part of the rationalist movement, favored at the time of Viollet le Duc. Modern in style, it is totally in line with the spirit of rationality and functionality. In this architecture, we celebrate a new art of living where the body and nature are privileged. It meets a simple objective: to let light in and make it the central element of the building".

In 1929, surrealist photographer and filmmaker Man Ray made a film inspired by his design for the buildings named "Villa Noailles" entitled The Mysteries of the Château de Dé.

During his career he assembled a team of artisans and craftspeople who worked with him: interior designers, sculptors, master glaziers, lighting specialists, and ironsmiths. An example of his collaborative nature is provided by the Union des Artistes Moderne (UAM), formed in 1929 by a group of 25 dissidents of the Société des Artistes-Décorateurs (SAD). Mallet-Stevens was the UAM's first president. Mallet-Stevens served as the director of the École des beaux-arts de Lille from 1935 to 1939.

== Legacy ==
Mallet-Stevens ordered that his archives be destroyed upon his death. His wishes were honored and his memory fell into obscurity. A French exhibit of his drawings, models, and actual works at the Centre Pompidou in 2005 sparked public interest in his contributions.

== Personal life ==
On 28 March 1912, Mallet-Stevens married Alice Kahn Mallet (née Kahn; 1884–1979) before later divorcing.

In 1921 Mallet-Stevens met and later married Andrée Rose Léon (formerly Guggenheim; 1891–1978), with whom he had children.

== Buildings and projects ==
- Villa Paul Poiret (1921–1923), in Mézy-sur-Seine completed in 1932
- Villa Noailles (1923–1928), in Hyères
- Villa Cavrois (1929–1932), in Croix
- Villa Trapenard (1932), in Sceaux
- Rue Mallet-Stevens (1927), Paris:
  - Villa Allatini, Rue Mallet-Stevens 5
  - Villa de Daniel Dreyfuss, Rue Mallet-Stevens 7
  - Villa Reifenberg, Rue Mallet-Stevens 8
  - Villa des Frères Martel, Rue Mallet-Stevens 10
  - Villa Mallet-Stevens, Rue Mallet-Stevens 12
- Garage Alfa Romeo, Rue Marbeuf, Paris
- House of Louis Barillet, Square Vergennes 15, Paris
- Caserne des Pompiers (firestation, 1935), rue Mesnil 8, Paris
- Immeuble de rapport de la rue Méchain (1928-1929), in Paris where Tamara de Lempicka used to live until World War II.
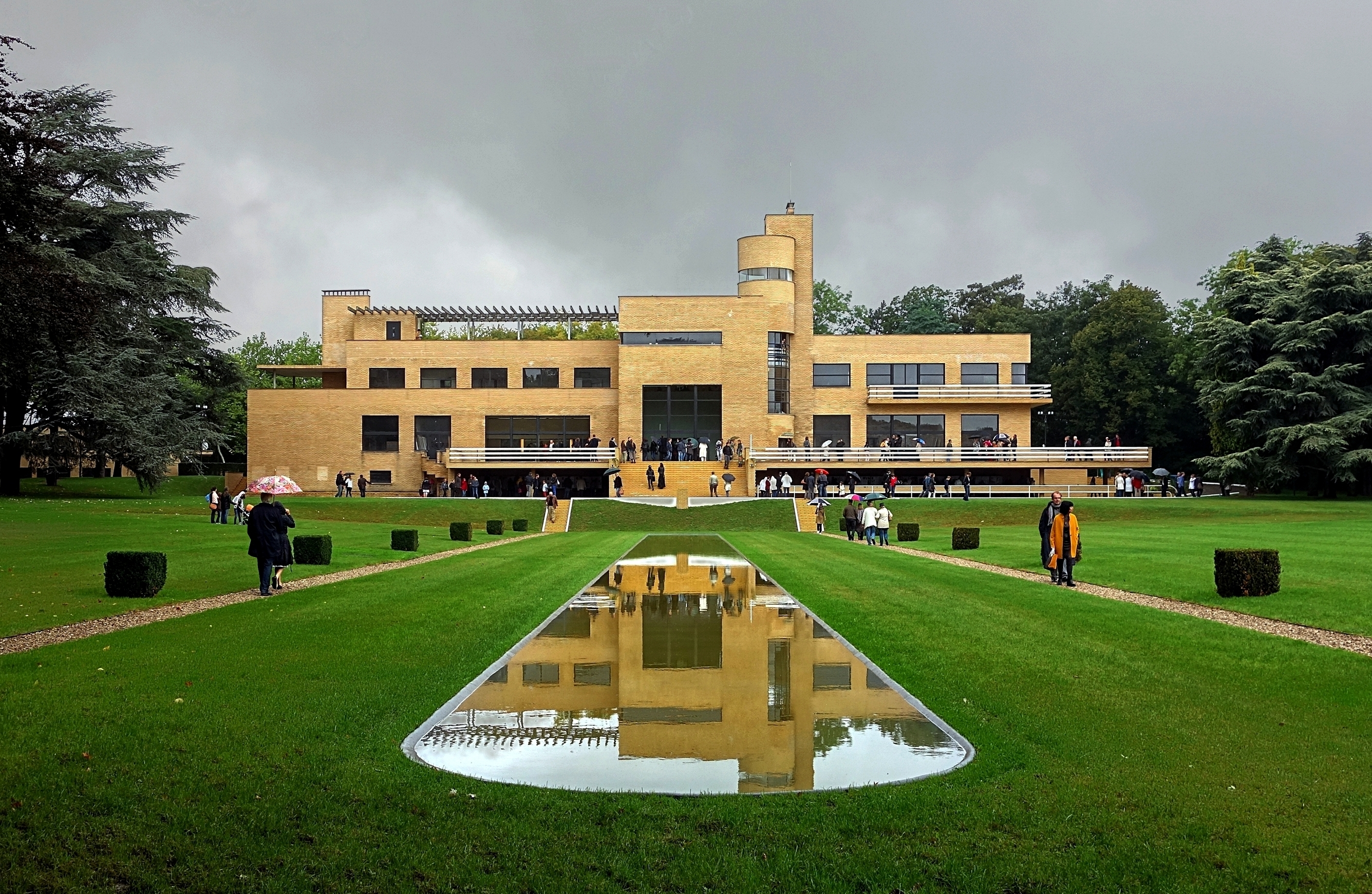
Villa Cavrois

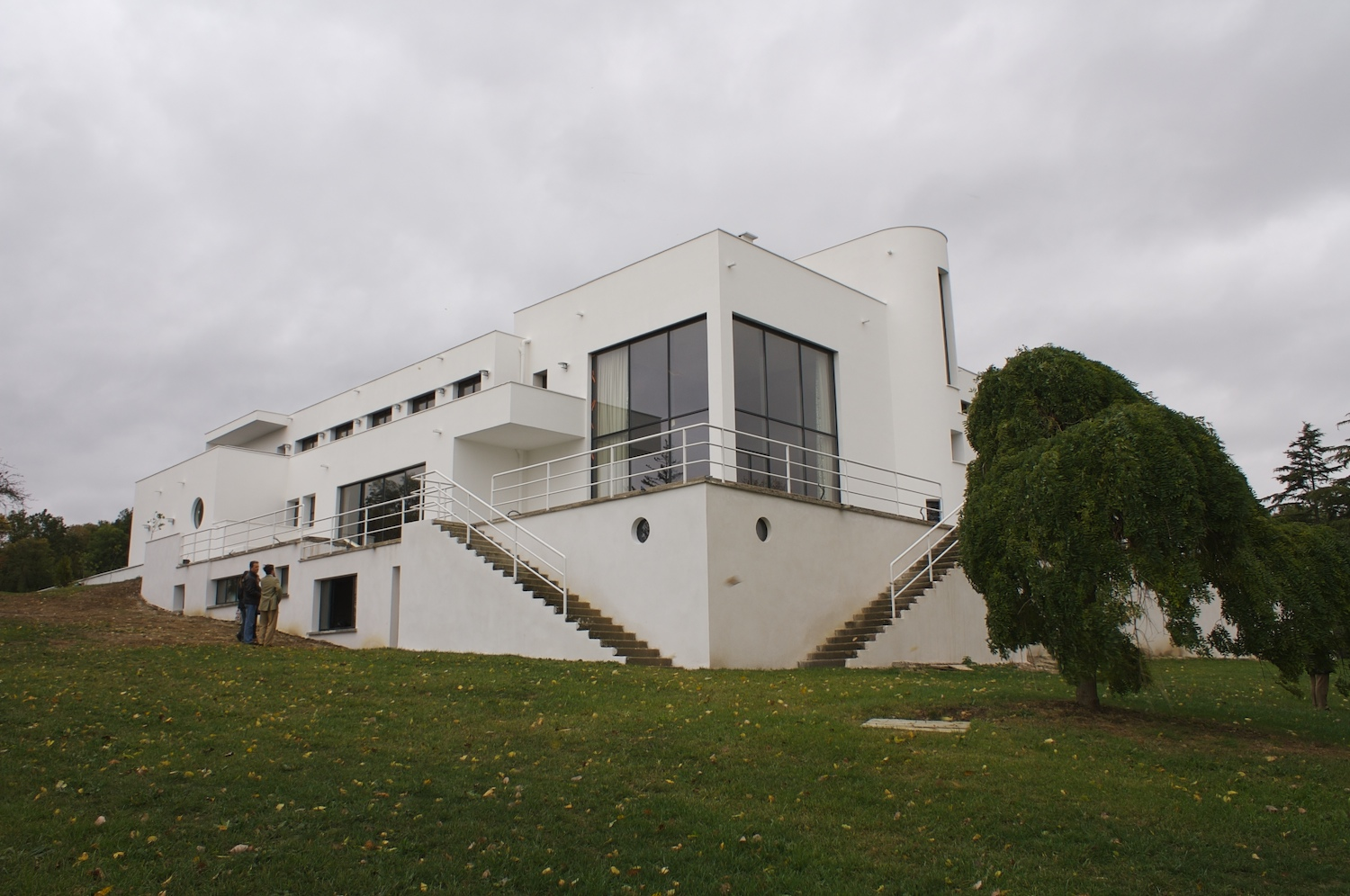
Villa Paul Poiret, 1921-1923

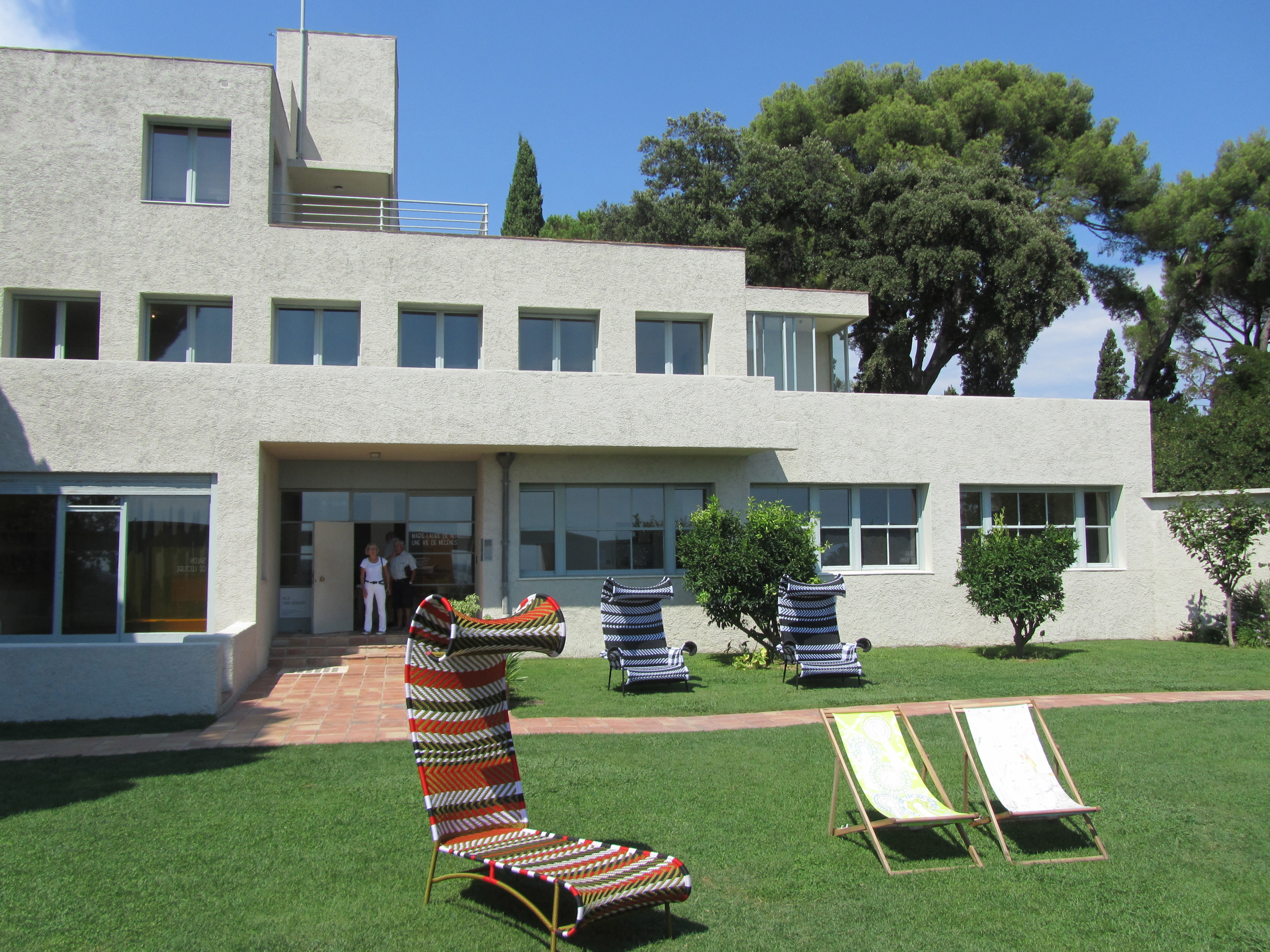
Villa Noailles

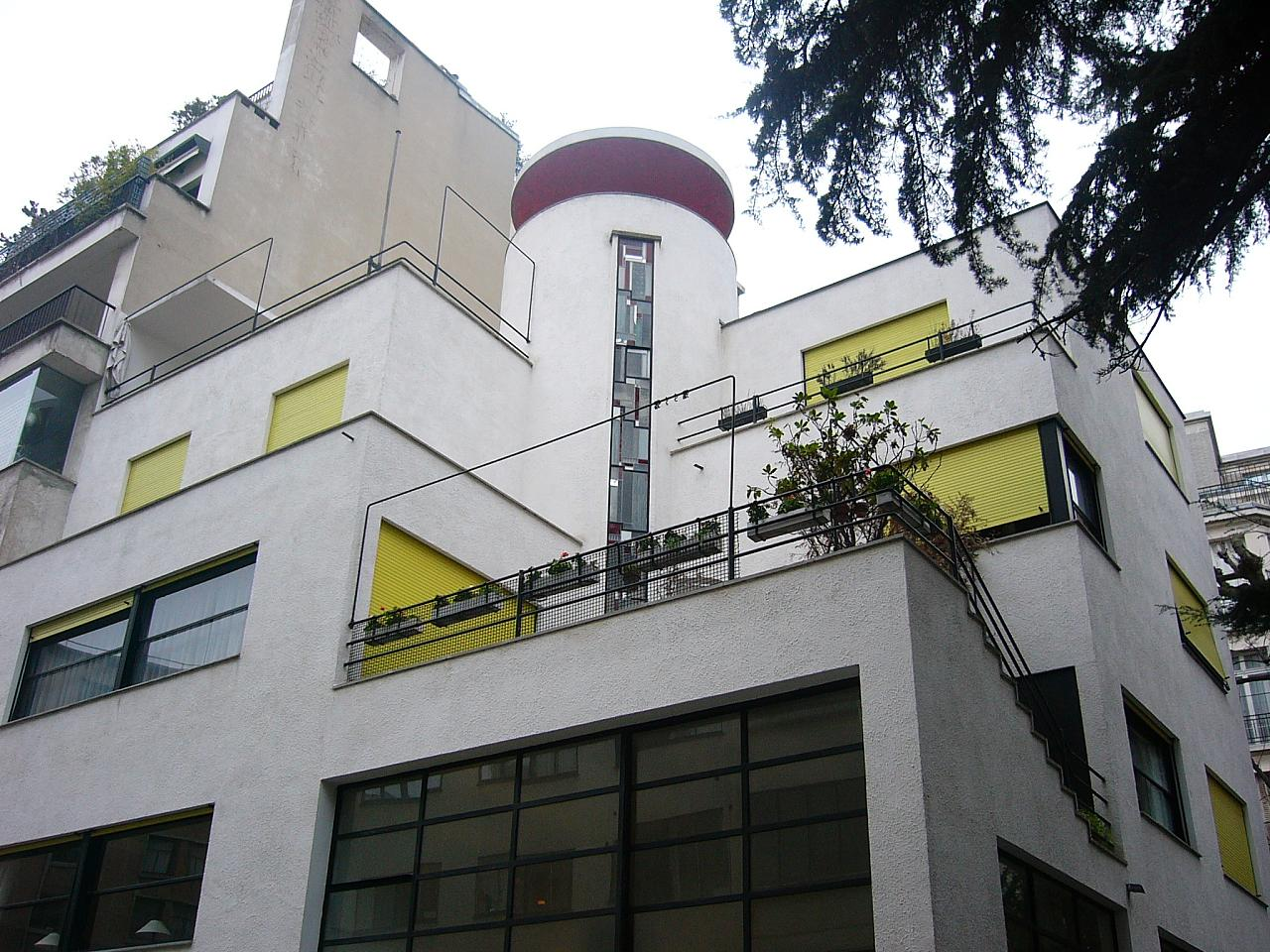
Hôtel Martel rue Mallet-Stevens, 1926-1927

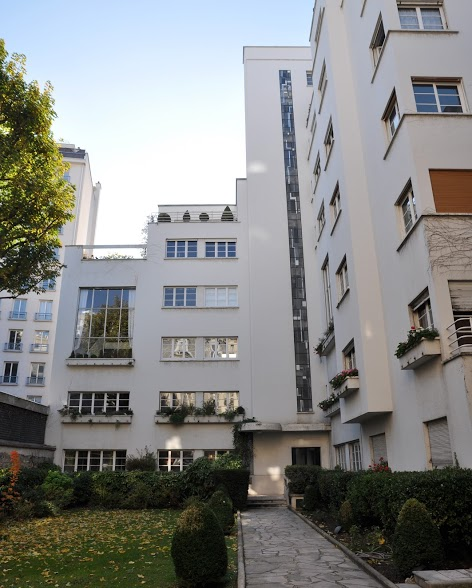
Immeuble de rapport du 7 rue Méchain in Paris
