= Villa Paul Poiret =

Building in Yvelines, France

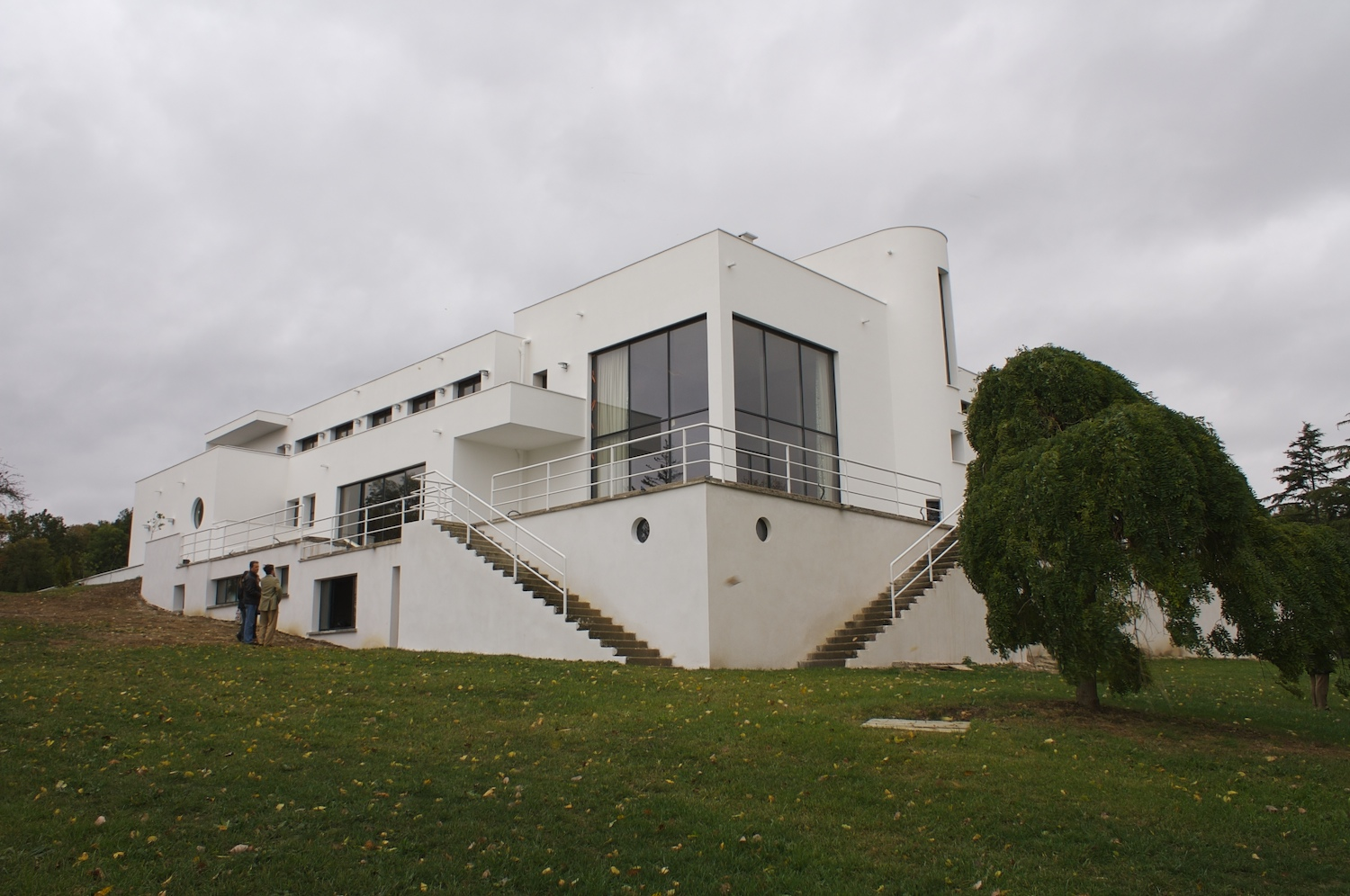
- Villa Paul Poiret

- Location within France

General information
- Architectural style: International style
- Location: Mézy-sur-Seine, France
- Coordinates: 48°59′56″N 1°52′16″E
- Construction started: 1924
- Completed: 1925
- Client: Paul Poiret

Design and construction
- Architect: Robert Mallet-Stevens

Villa Paul Poiret in Mézy-sur-Seine, Yvelines, France, is an early 1920s Cubism-inspired Art Deco private house originally designed by architect Robert Mallet-Stevens.

The house stands in 48,500 square metres (12.0 acres) of parkland in Mézy-sur-Seine, to the west of Paris, overlooking the Seine Valley. It is constructed in reinforced concrete in a geometric style, has 25 rooms on three levels, 800 square metres (8,600 sq ft) of internal space, an upper terrace with panoramic views, and a 7-metre-tall (23 ft) corner salon with floor-to-ceiling windows.

Villa Paul Poiret was commissioned by fashion designer Paul Poiret in 1921; its building completed in 1925. The house fell into disrepair, and was sold by Poiret in 1930 to actress Elvira Popescu, who lived there from 1938 to 1985. Popescu hired the architect Paul Boyer in 1932 to alter the original design to the contemporary Art Deco Paquebot (steamship) style, converting windows to portholes, and rounding-off terrace corners. The house was listed as an historic landmark in 1984.

In 1999 the house, which had once more become dilapidated, was bought by Laurent Brun. Under the auspices of the French National Historic Landmark Commission and the Bâtiments de France, (the two bodies responsible for listed buildings), the Mallet-Stevens exterior and the Popescu/Boyer interior have been restored.

Villa Paul Poiret is part of the Journées de Patrimoine, (Heritage Days), scheme in which public and private buildings of historic importance are open to the public on the third weekend in September.

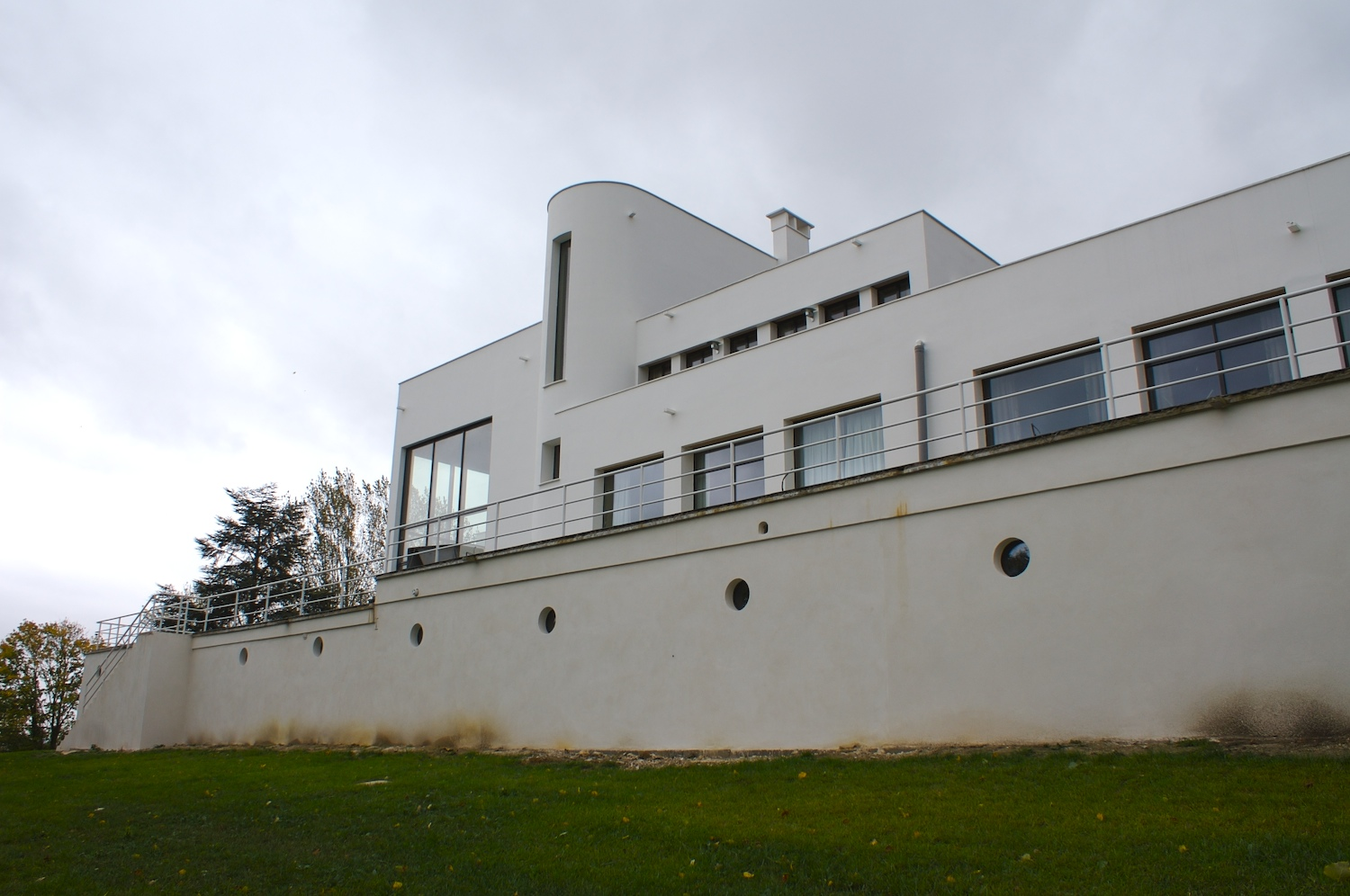
East view

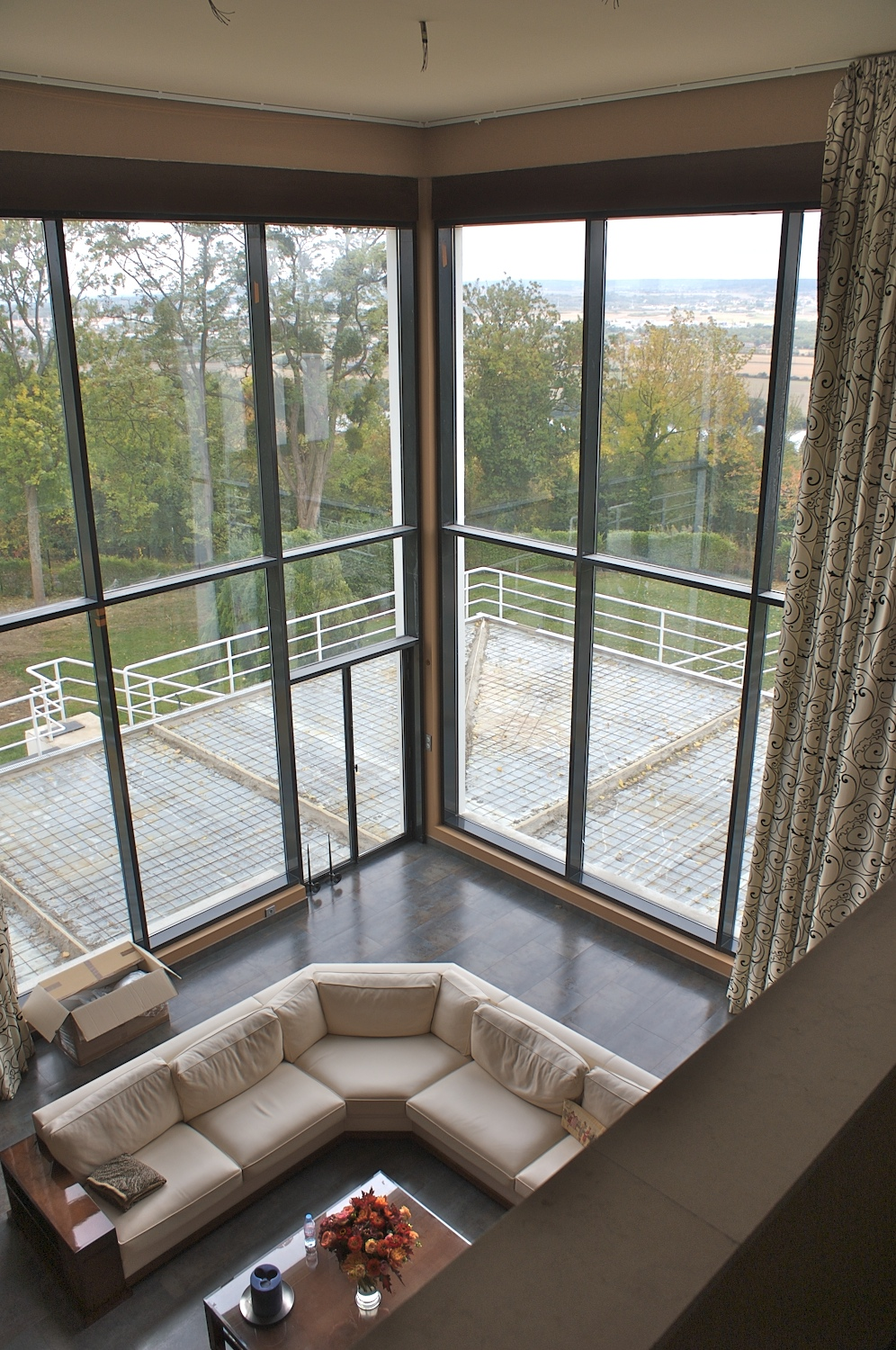
Interior (salon)

== See also ==
- Villa Cavrois
- Villa Noailles
