= Villa Cavrois =

Modernist mansion by Robert Mallet-Stevens

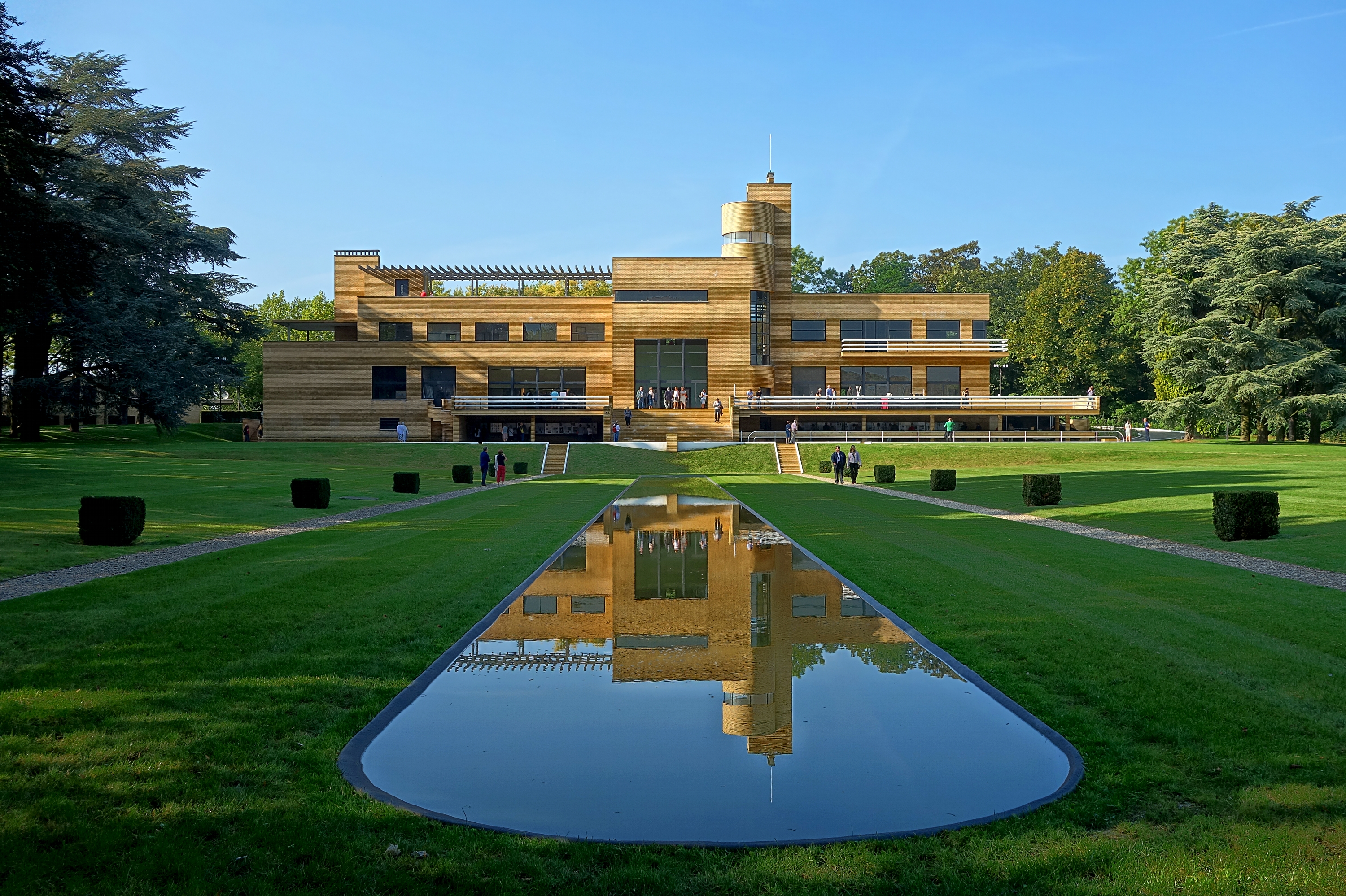
- Villa Cavrois

- Location within France

General information
- Type: Private house
- Architectural style: International style
- Location: 60 Avenue du Président John Fitzgerald Kennedy, Croix, France
- Coordinates: 50°40′00″N 3°09′51″E
- Construction started: 1929
- Completed: 1932
- Renovated: 2015
- Client: Paul Cavrois

Design and construction
- Architect: Robert Mallet-Stevens

Website
- www.villa-cavrois.fr/en

Villa Cavrois in Croix is a large modernist mansion built in 1932 by French architect Robert Mallet-Stevens for Paul Cavrois, an industrialist from Roubaix active in the textile industry.

== Context and genesis of the project ==
Paul Cavrois (1890-1965) was a textile industrialist from northern France who owned modern factories for spinning, weaving and dyeing cotton and wool. In the early 1920s he bought a site located on the hill of Beaumont, in Croix, not far from his factories situated in Roubaix, in order to build a mansion able to receive his family of 7 children and the servants.

Originally the architect and town-planner Jacques Greber was charged with the project, who suggested a house in the regionalist style, in vogue at that period. Finally Paul Cavrois turned to Robert Mallet-Stevens after he met him in 1925 at the International Exposition of Modern Industrial and Decorative Arts in Paris.The owners gave the architect free rein on the project, and, for the first time in his career, Mallet-Stevens was responsible for the entire work, down to the last details. The villa is conceived by the architect as a total artwork and it represents the outcome of his technical and aesthetic reflections. The villa was inaugurated on 5 July 1932, for the wedding of Geneviève Cavrois, the eldest daughter of the couple Cavrois, after 3 years of work.

At the completion of the work the villa was astonishing for its bravery and modernity, and its style was a total break from that of other neighbouring houses in the suburb of Croix, even those of the same era. Clear guidelines governed the design of the building, which was commissioned in 1929, included: "air, light, work, sports, hygiene, comfort and efficiency".

== Decline and acquisition by the state ==
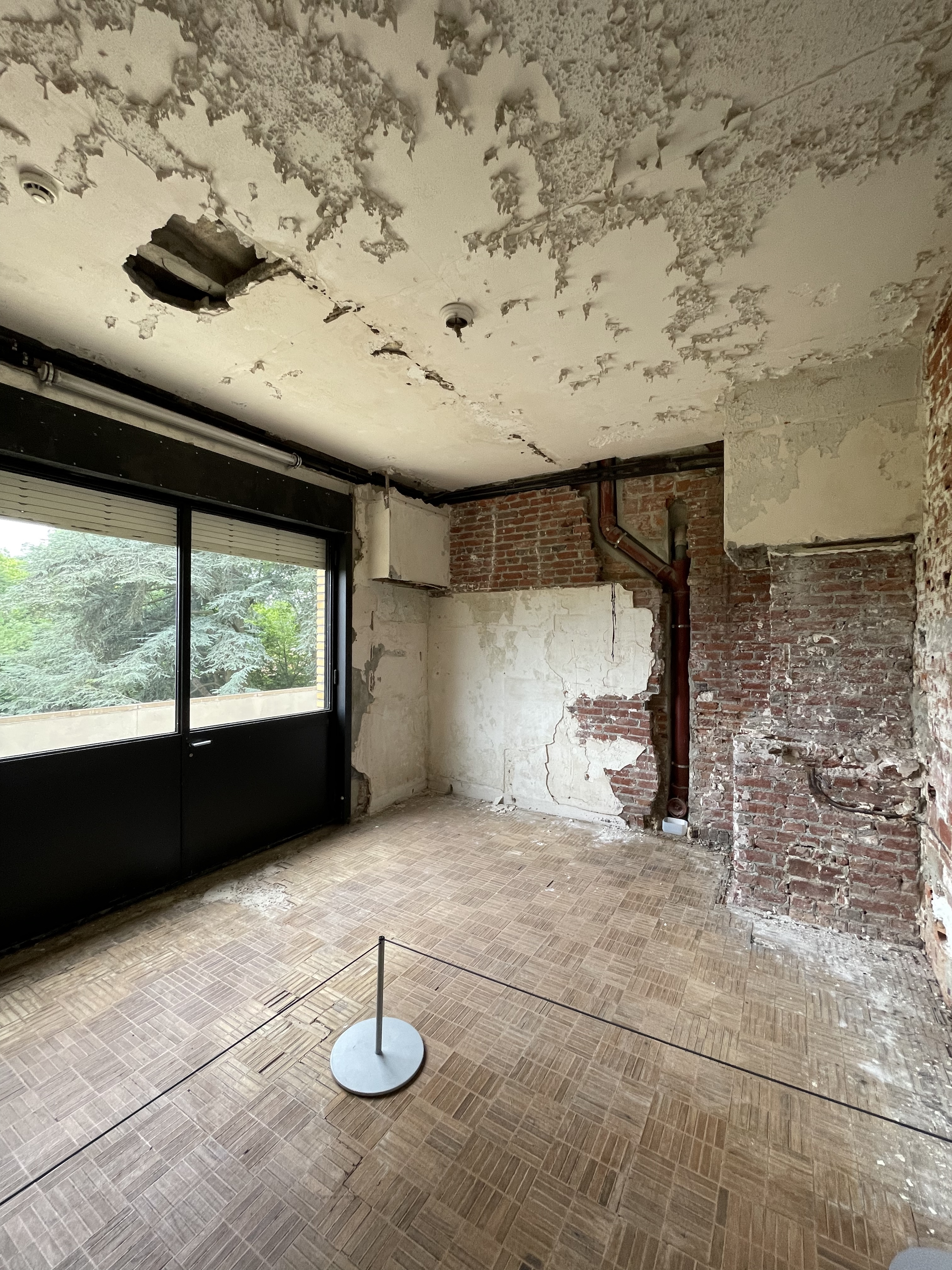
One room was left untouched during the renovation to show the extent of the damage.

During the second world war the Cavrois family left the North region to take refuge in their manor in Normandy. The villa was occupied by German troops who turned it into a barracks able to receive 200 soldiers. The Cavrois family returned to their house after the war, when, in 1947, Paul Cavrois asked Pierre Barbe to modify the villa in order to create two apartments to house the families of their sons Paul and Francis. In this way two independent habitations were created in the west wing of the building while Paul and Lucie continued to live in the east section of the villa.

The Cavrois resided in the villa until the death of Lucie Cavrois in 1985: in the same year the sons sold the furniture of the villa in an auction. In 1987 the villa was sold to a real estate company who wanted to demolish it and divide the land into plots. However, the villa was abandoned and quickly looted, ransacked and occupied by squatters. In 1990, the property and grounds were classified as an historic monument by decree of the Conseil d'État. That same year saw the birth of an association to protect and preserve the house. Since its inception the association has lobbied the state authorities concerning the fate of the villa.[1] The French State, through its Ministry of Culture, purchased the building in 2001, and, in 2004, restoration work commenced on the exterior and the reinstatement of the internal features.

On December 18, 2008, the Ministry of Culture entrusted villa Cavrois to Centre des Monuments Nationaux (CMN), with the purpose of restoring it and opening it to the public. CMN conducted the restoration of the interior spaces and decor (floors, wall coverings, paintwork, furniture), in order to recreate, as closely as possible, the condition of the building in the 1930s. One room on the upper floor was intentionally left untouched to show the extent of the damage that was done in the decades before. CMN has also restored the gardens (replantation of trees, restoration of the water features and the original alleys) and the illumination of the park and the villa. The villa opened to the public on 13 June 2015.

== A modern concept ==
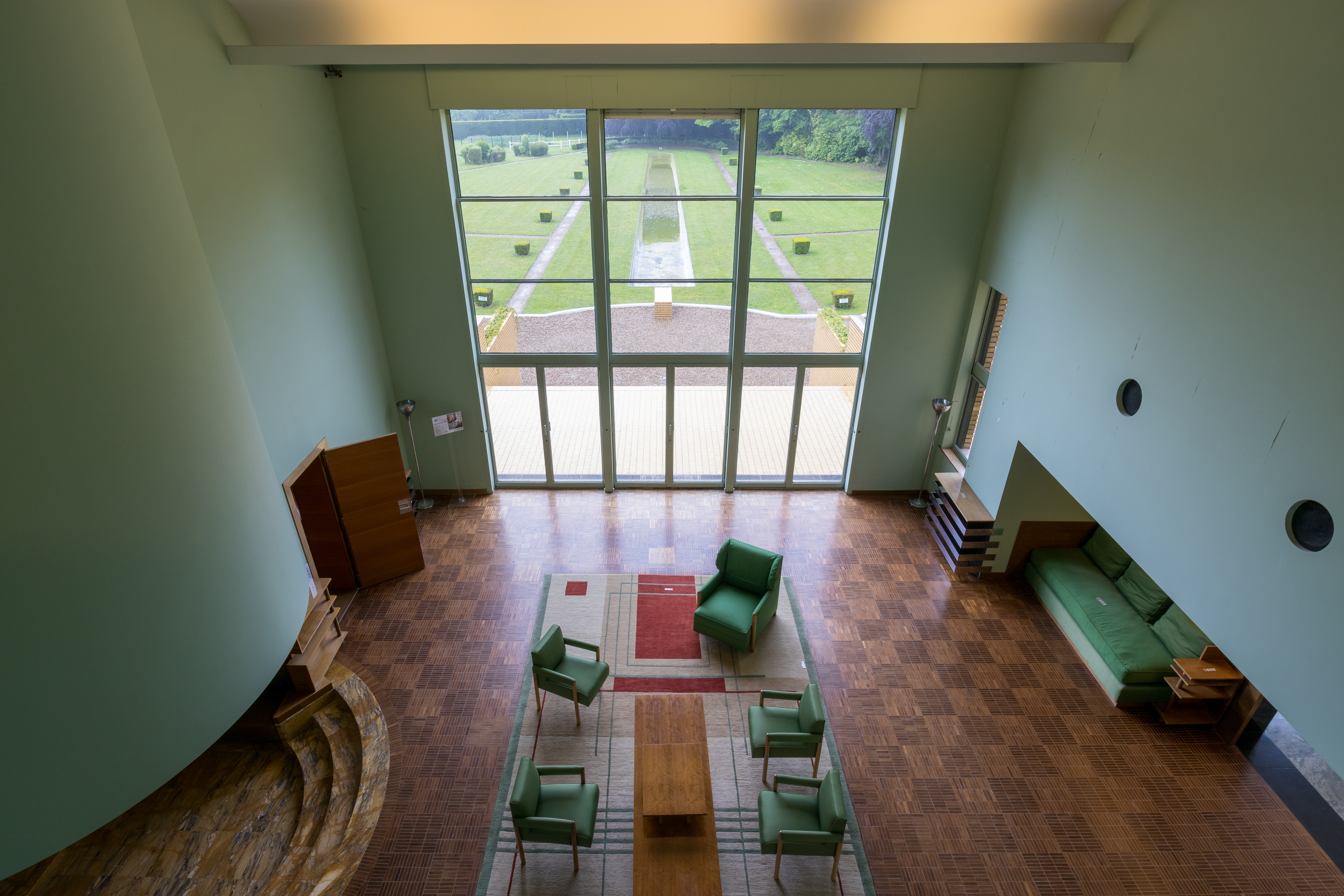
The Hall-Salon

The Villa Cavrois is a masterpiece of modern architecture and a unique example in the North of France. The villa is 60 meters long, it has 3800 m^{2} including 1840 m^{2} habitables and 830 m^{2} of terraces and a garden of 17600 m^{2} (originally 5 ha). The Villa Cavrois is a testimony to the modernist vision of the 1920s as it was conceived by designers such as Le Corbusier, Pierre Chareau and the Bauhaus school. Luminosity, hygiene and comfort are the keywords that underlie such buildings. Villa Cavrois illustrates this concept with simplicity and elegance.

The large modern mansion was organized to offer the best possible lifestyle to the nine members of the family and to facilitate the daily work of the household staff. Mallet-Stevens' work was not limited to the design of the building. He also designed the interior decoration and the gardens which surround the house.

The choice of materials (concrete ceiling, metal, steel, glass, green Swedish marble in the main dining room, yellow Siena marble in the fireplace alcove of the hall-salon, parquets of oak, iroko, zebrawood, Cuban mahogany) and the furniture of the rooms echoed the hierarchy of space: everything was conceived and adapted for use in place. Simplicity and functionality of the furniture prevail in all parts. The luxury of this house does not lie in carved detailing or gilding, it unfolds in the richness of the materials used, such as unadorned marble, metal and wood.

The Villa Cavrois provided for its occupants a large number of amenities especially rare for the time, even in luxury houses. Use of the latest modern technology, especially electricity meant each room was provided with electric lighting, a radio loudspeaker, an electric clock and telephones enabled people to communicate between rooms or with the outside world. The villa was equipped with a modern boiler room and a wine cellar. The water system provided hot and cold water, as well as softened water for cooking and drinking. Lighting was the object of special care. The lighting, both direct and indirect, is very delicate and elegant. In collaboration with the lighting engineer André Salomon, Mallet-Stevens conceived an indirect lighting which fit in the architecture and he has provided most of the rooms of the villa of a lighting device system which direct the light towards the ceiling to obtain an unchanging light closer at the natural one. Hygiene was very important in the conception of the Villa Cavrois, as it is shown by the clinical aspect of the kitchen (metal and white paint) and also by the presence of a swimming pool of 27 metres long and 4 metres depth at the diving boards.

== Visiting the Villa Cavrois ==
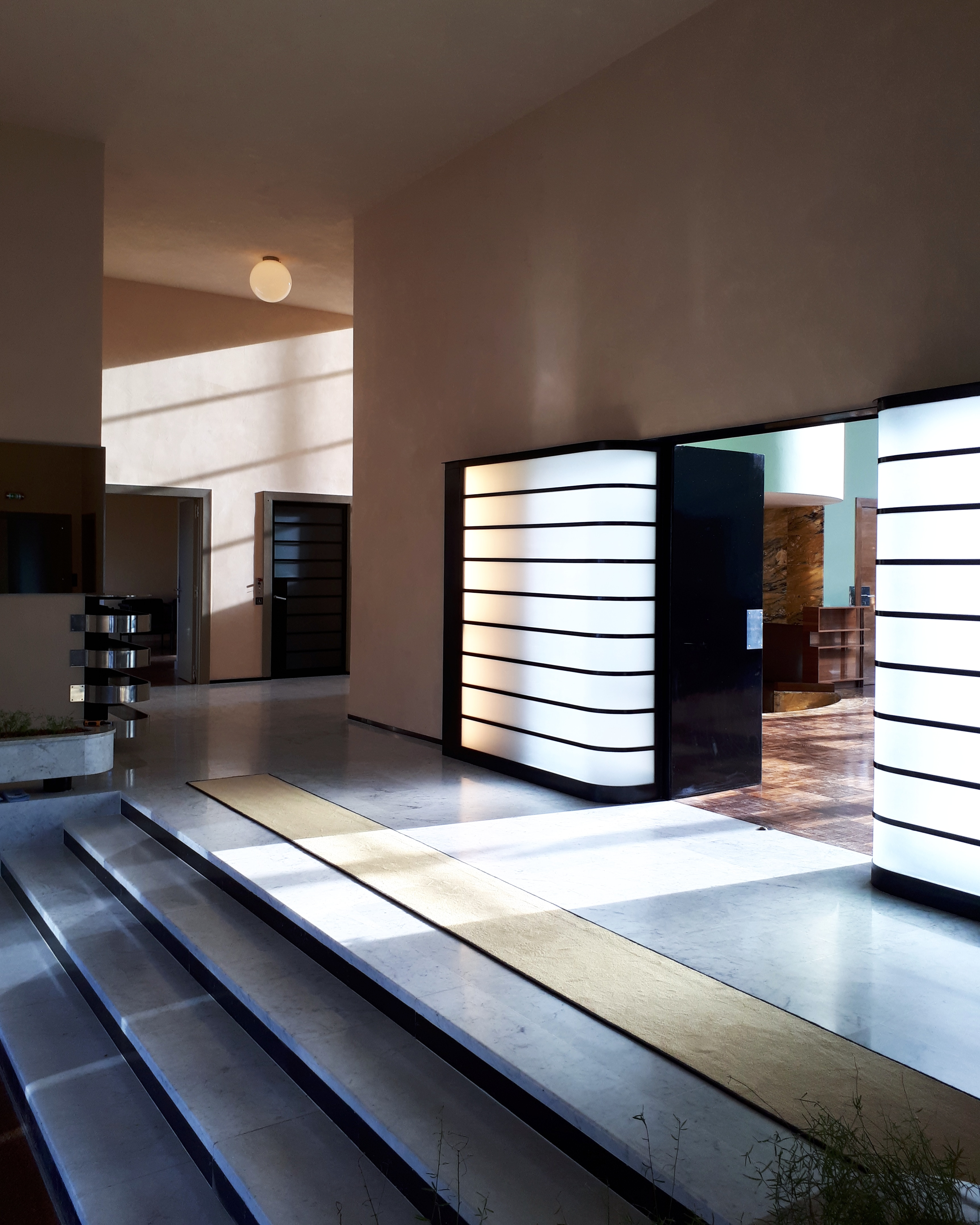
The vestibule with the lights boxes

The entrance of the estate is situated in the north-west corner of the terrain, displaced in relation to the main facade of the building. A round driveway enabled the cars to reach the garage, located in the caretaker's lodge, without having to manoeuvre. The villa introduce itself as yellow brick shell and it is the only realisation of Mallet-Stevens to have a similar frame. The French firm Bonzel produced twenty-six moulds of different form in order to make bricks capables to cover the diverse areas of the villa. The source of inspiration of this brick is the town hall of Hilversum, in the Netherlands, realized by the architect Willem Marinus Dudok. If the aesthetic canon of the villa is resolutely modern (large glass windows, flat-roofs, total absence of decoration, purity of lines), its plan is in line with the French tradition of the 17th- and 18-century châteaux: two symmetrical wings (the parents' wing and the children and household staff wing) evolve around the central corp of the villa, constituted by the vestibule and the hall salon. The plan of the villa is designed to facilitate the displacements and to organise the domestic life in a rational way. In the ground floor, the vestibule is a vast room used to distribute the spaces. The black door that opens to the hall-salon is framed by a pair of light boxes which look like those that Mallet-Stevens designed for the set of Marcel L'Herbier's movie Le Vertige. The hall-salon is a big double-height cubic room with a large glass window overlooking the park. The floor is covered with parquet and the walls are painted green. On the east side is situated the fireplace alcove wrapped in yellow Siena marble and set up with leather banquettes. Thanks to a sliding door situated on the west side one can reach the parents' dining room, which is characterised by the walls and the floor in green Swedish marble and the black lacquered pear wood furniture. Adjoining to the parents' dining room, the children's dining room is furnished with a table and six chairs in zebrawood (originals). This room has an independent access to the garden thanks to the exterior corkscrew stairs. from the two dining rooms one can gain access to the pantry and the kitchen. This spaces demonstrate the importance of hygiene in the conception of a modern house by Robert Mallet-Stevens as it is shown by the presence of a metal furniture, easy to clean, the black-and-white chequerboard floor and the walls covered with white tiles bringing additional luminosity. Still in the ground-floor, in the east wing, Paul Cavrois' study, furnished with varnished natural pear wood, give access to the smoking-room, a little circular room calling to mind a cabin of a liner that is provided with a cigar and alcohol cabinet in natural Cuban mahogany and leather bench seats. The east end of the ground-floor is occupied by the two young men's rooms, one with an intense and living polychromy of the walls, a tribute to the Dutch artistic movement De Stijl, and the other one with the walls painted in different shades of yellow and the furniture in black-and-white ceruse oak wood.

One can reach the first floor by the monumental staircase, built into the belvedere tower, with white marble steps and black marble risers. the west wing is reserved to the children and the governess's rooms while the east wing house the parental suite. In the children's wing, the boys' room has not been restored to show the condition of the villa before the restoration work. In the parents' wing, the master bedroom presents itself with a furniture in palm wood and the walls painted beige, which give it elegance et refinement. The boudoir of Lucie Cavrois looks more casual as a result of the blond tone of the furnitures in sycamore, the walls painted in light blue and the navy blue moquette. The master bathroom is a dual-aspect room of around 60 m^{2}. This space is constituted of a part reserved to the dressing, with a black-and-white polka-dot moquette, and a part consecrated to the ablutions (bathtub and shower cabin equipped with water jets) with the floor in white Carrara marble. In this room are presented a barometer and a built-in scale.

The second floor, isolated from the rest of the villa, is constituted by the playroom and the study rooms. The playroom is a huge space with walls in red oilcloth above and aluminium below. From the playroom one can access to the terrace which could turn into a summer dining-room thanks to the dumbwaiter connected with the kitchen. In the basement, the laundry-room is equipped with a mangle, an ironing machine and a drying closet. In this space is displayed the original garden's furniture. Behind the laundry room is the boiler room which accommodates two fuel boilers, one for the heating and the other one for the hot water. The fuel storage tanks are hosted in a separate space in front of the boiler-room. The wine cellar has been converted in a resource center with a large choice of materials presents in the villa and a set original evidences of the villa.

Historian Willem de Bruijn has insisted on the omnipresence of mirrors in Villa Cavrois, believing this reflects Mallet-Stevens’ background as a set designer for films, where mirrors were abundantly used. Through the mirrors, “walls are broken in half” and any “sense of interior stability” is voluntarily broken. De Bruijn also insists on the black mirror found in “the young master’s bedroom on the ground floor,” creating “an impression of darkness and mystery.”

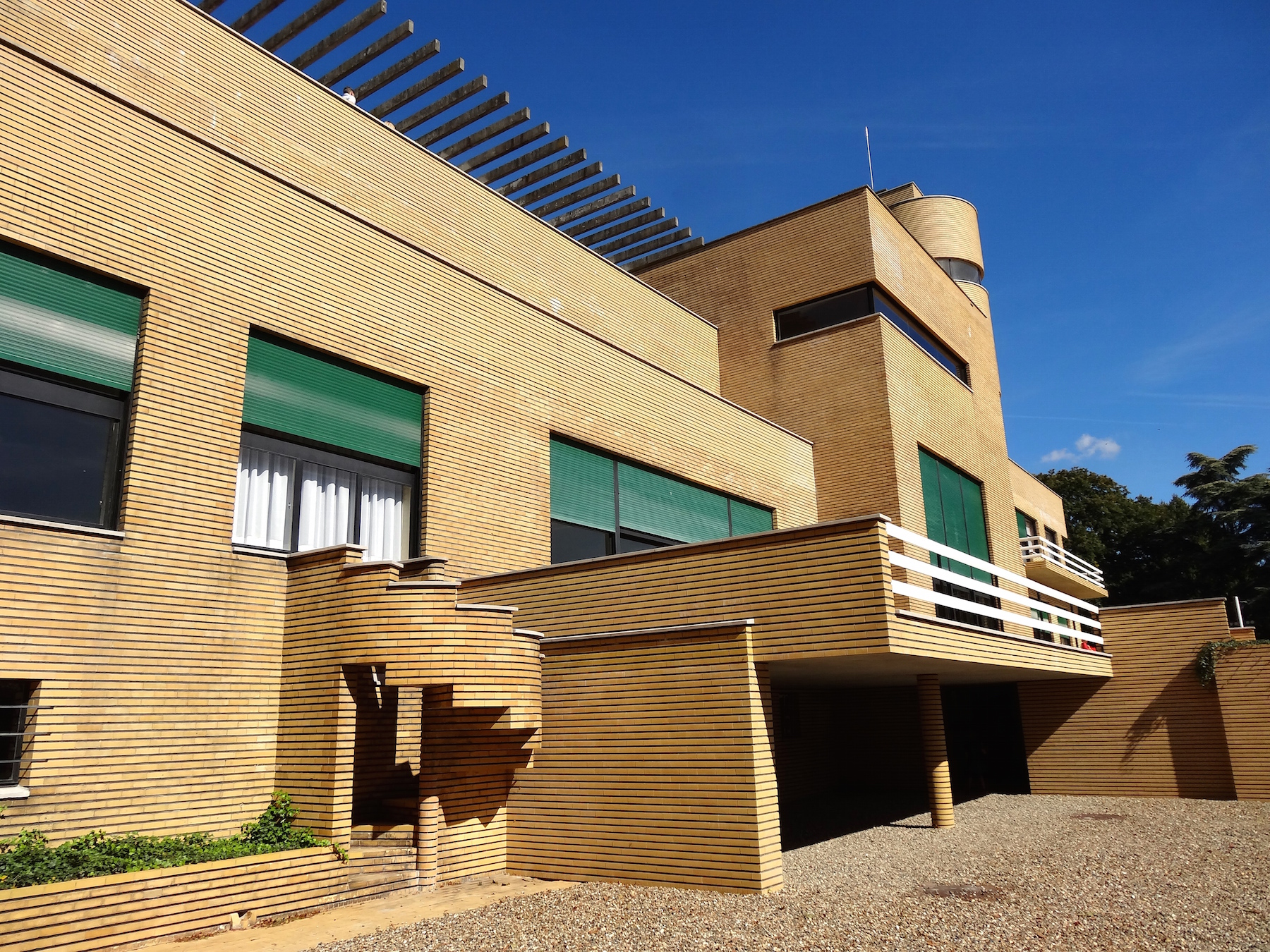
Façade of the villa

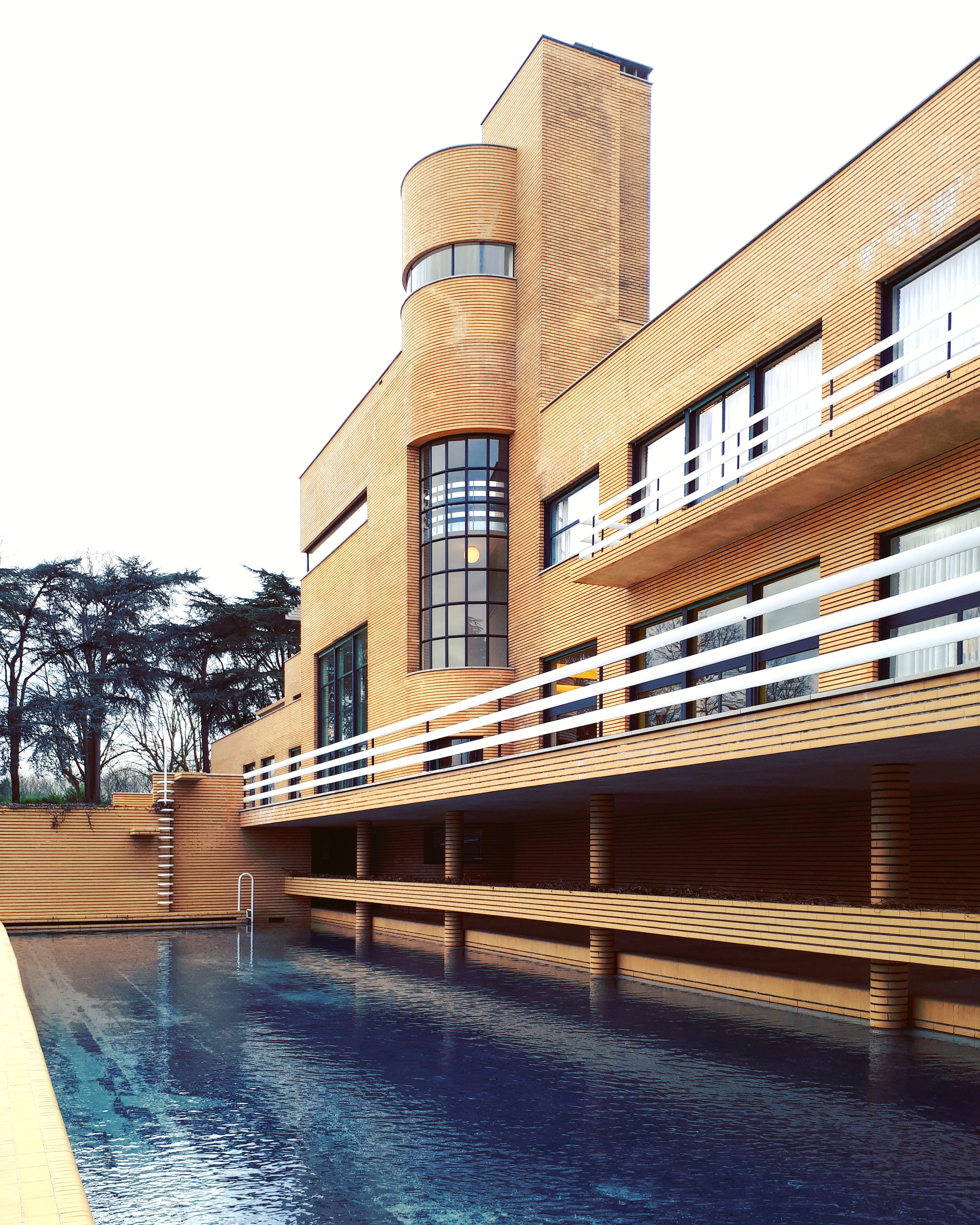

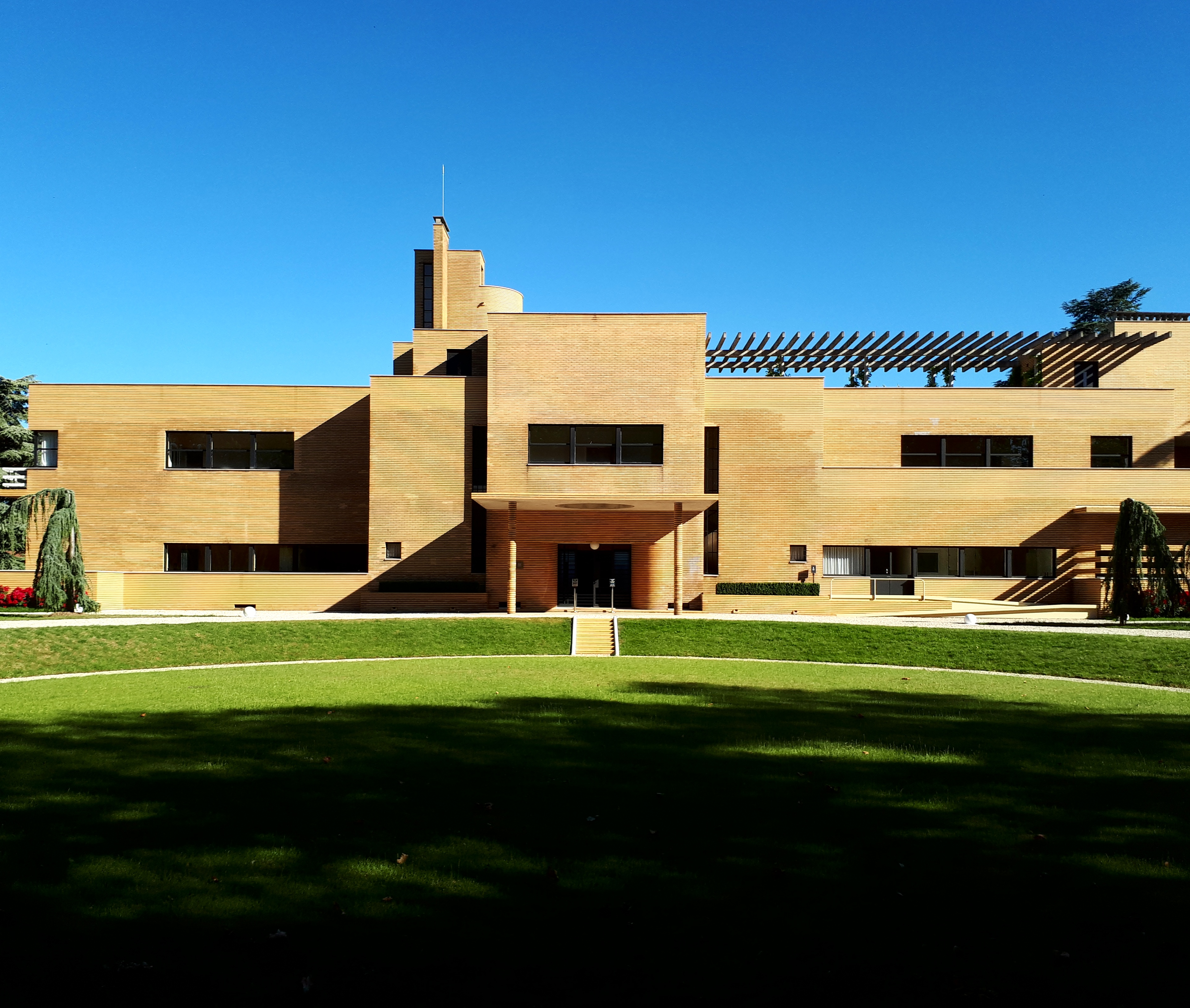

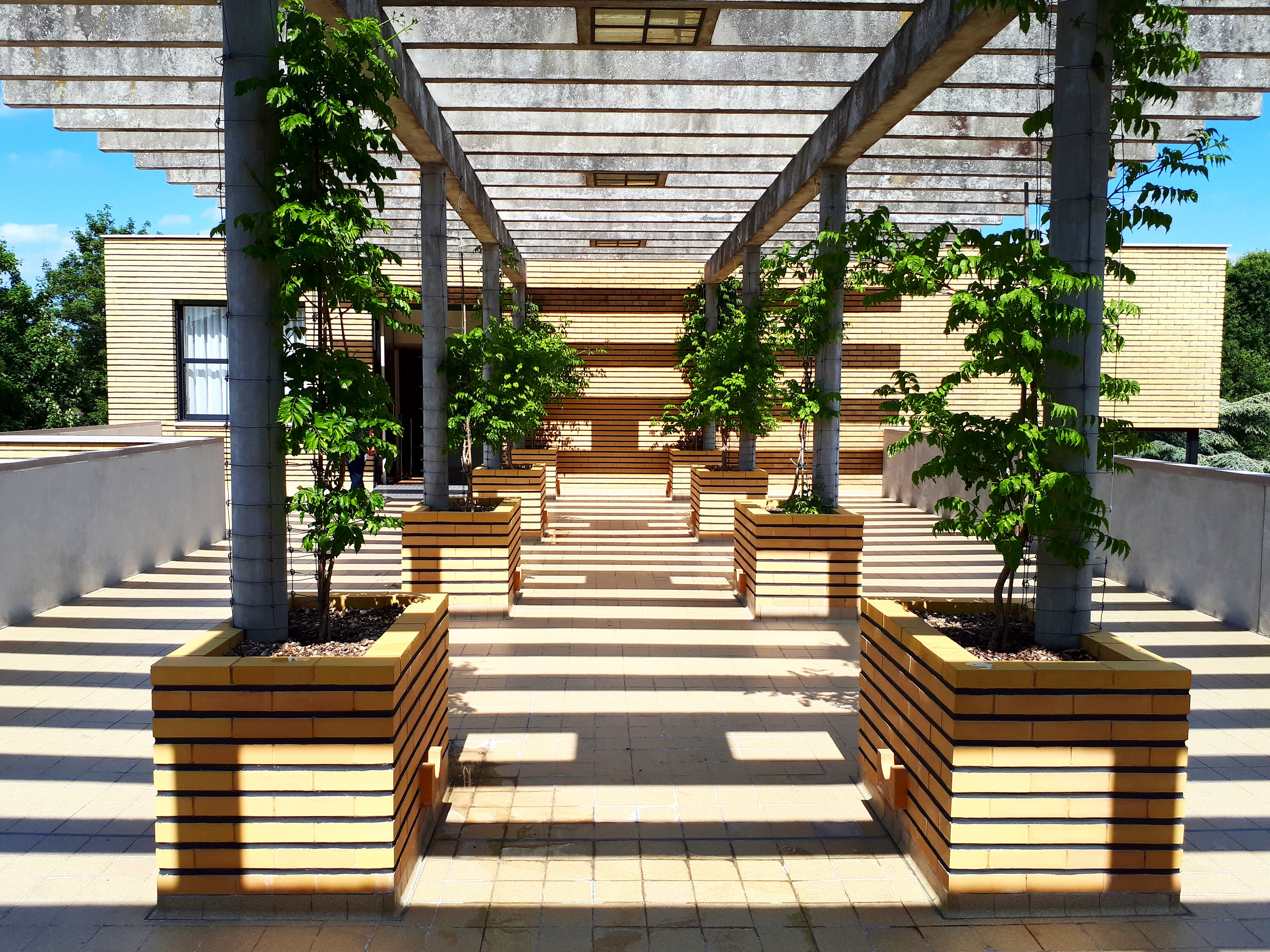

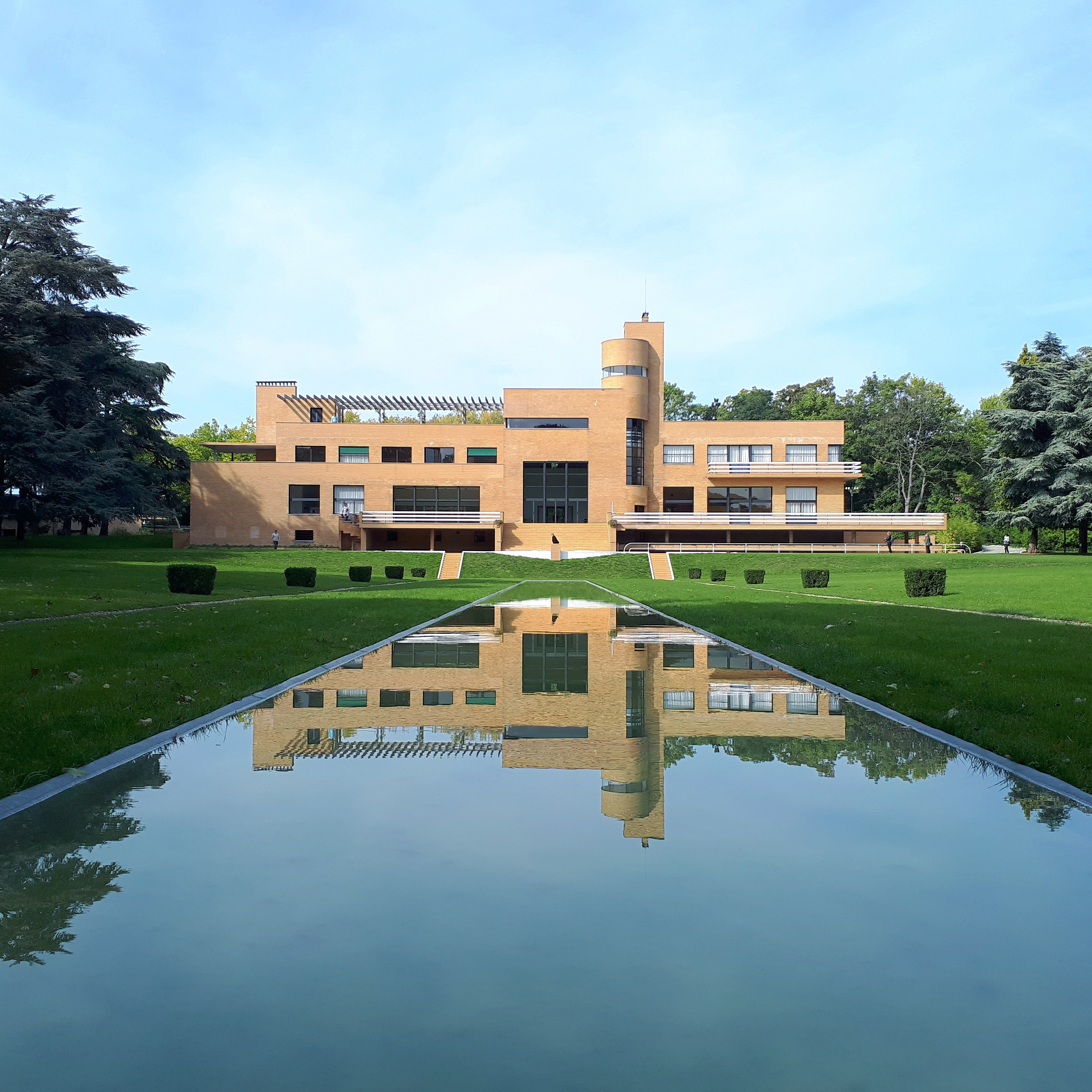

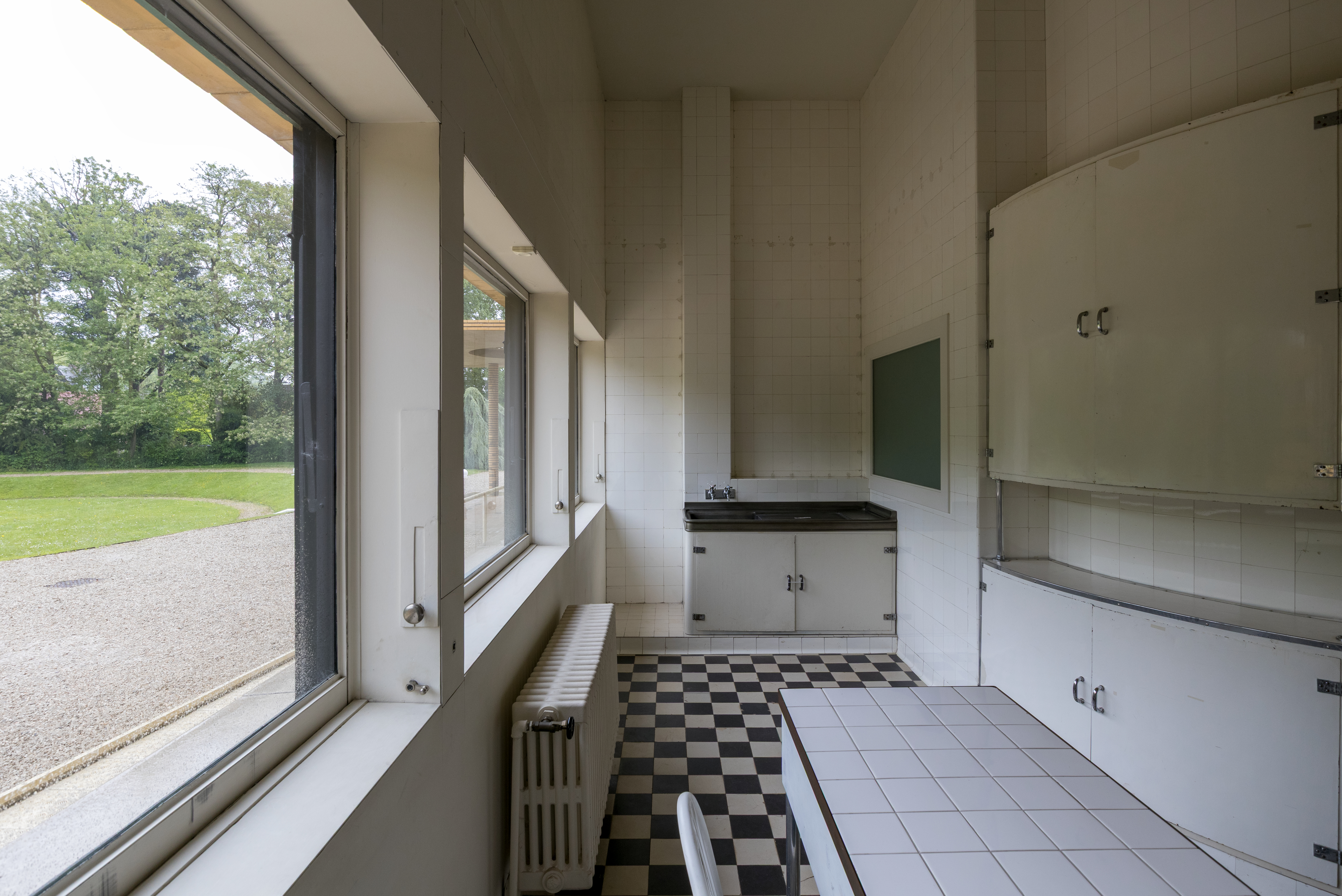
kitchen with park views

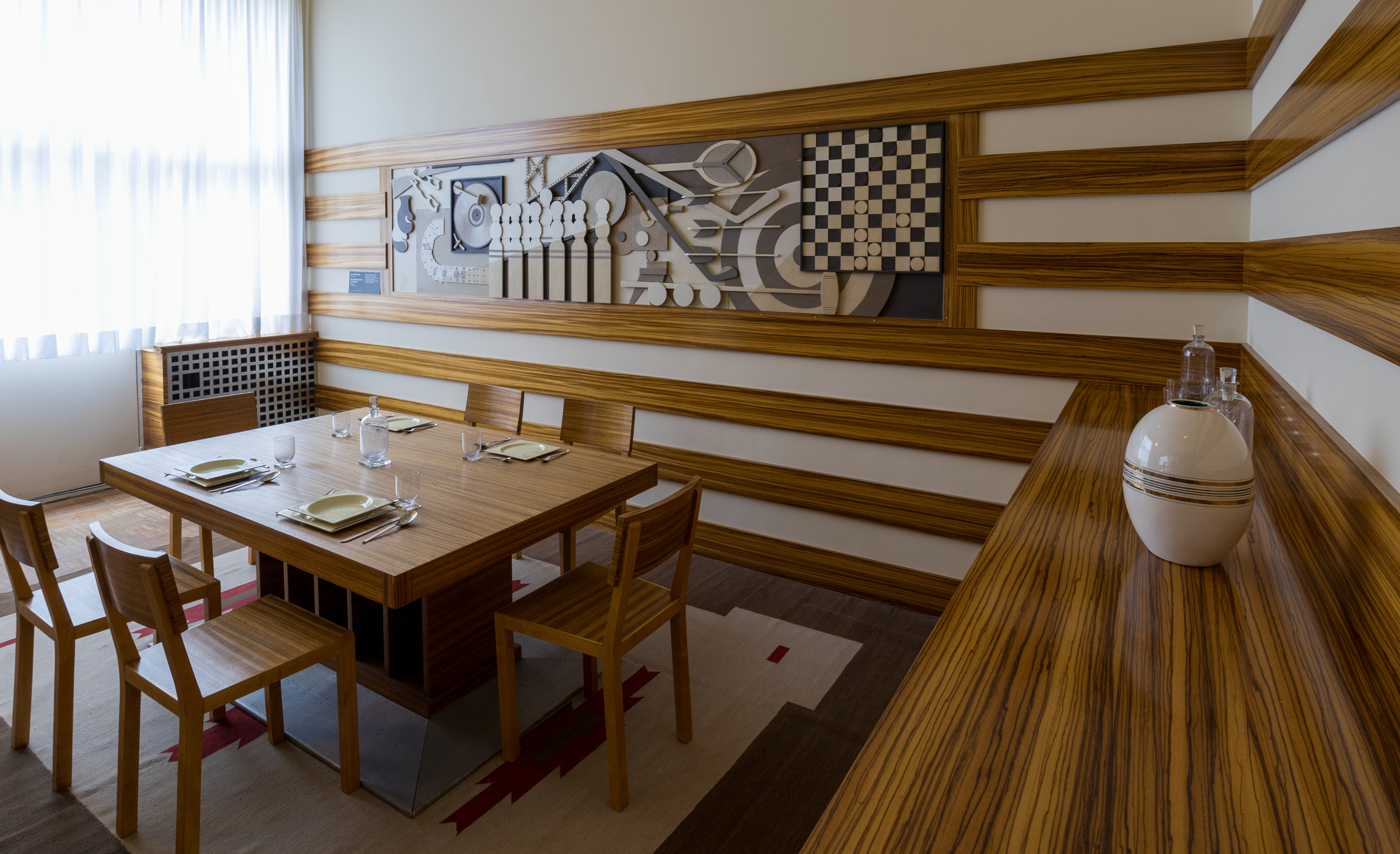
Children's dining room

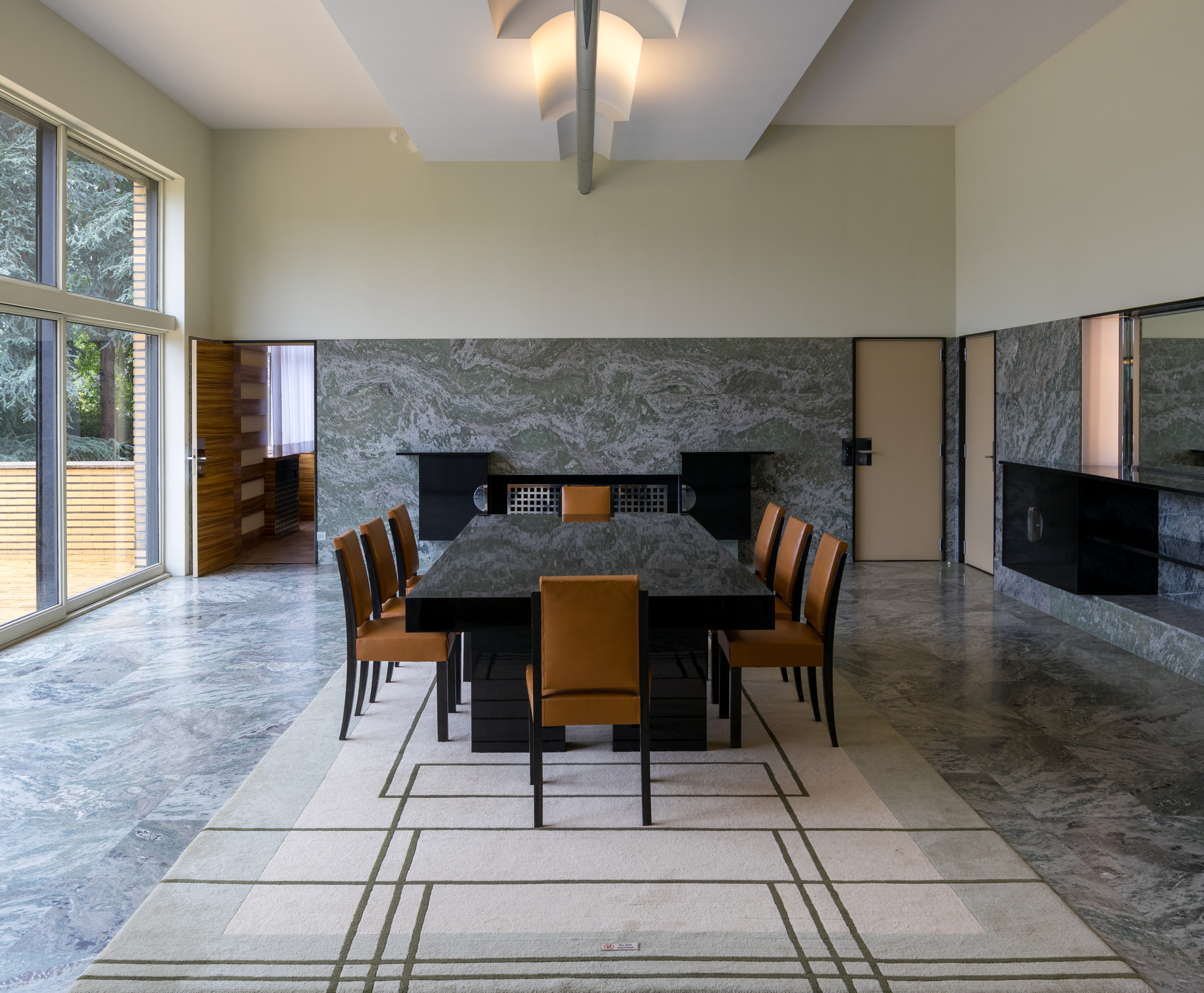
Dining room

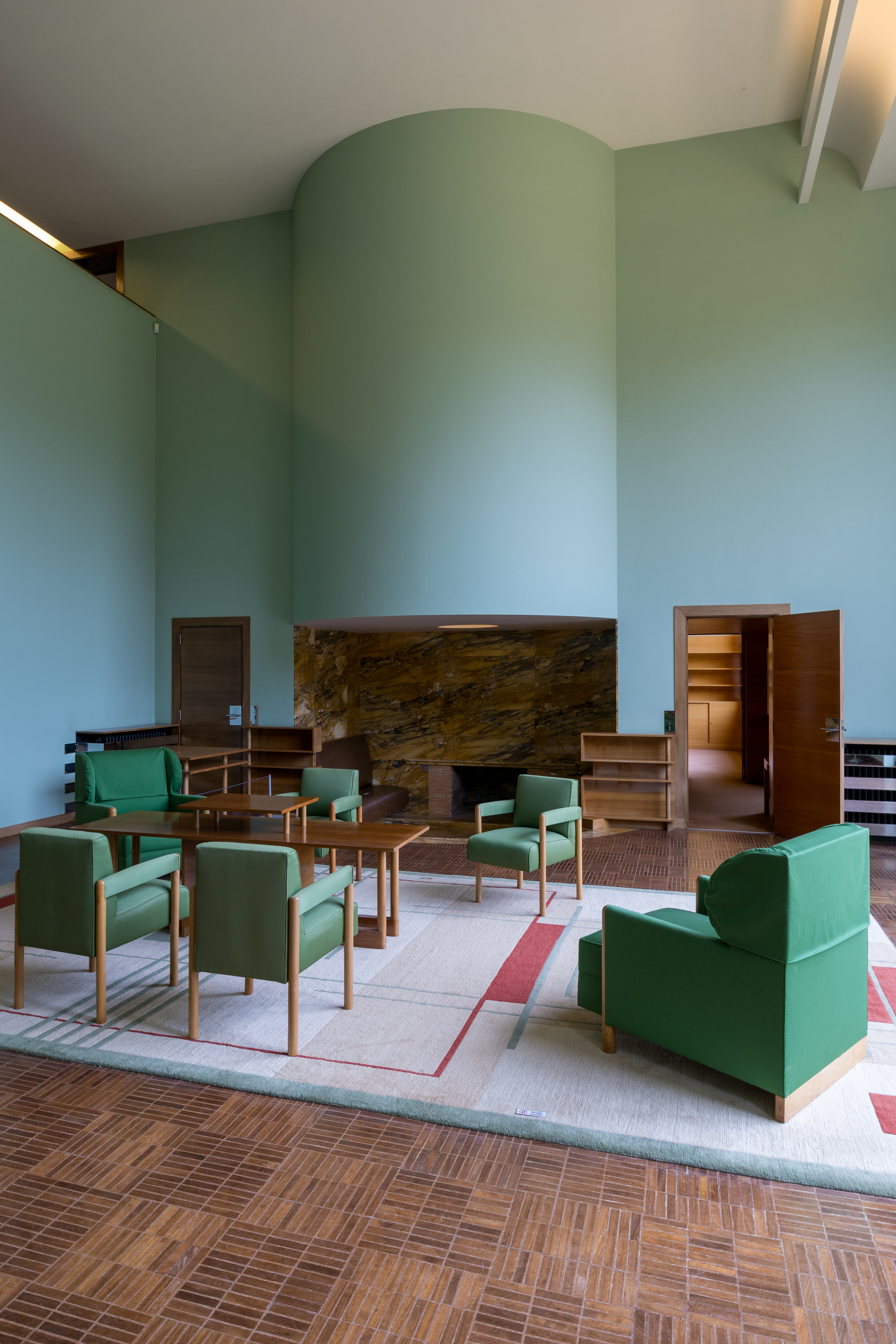
Living room

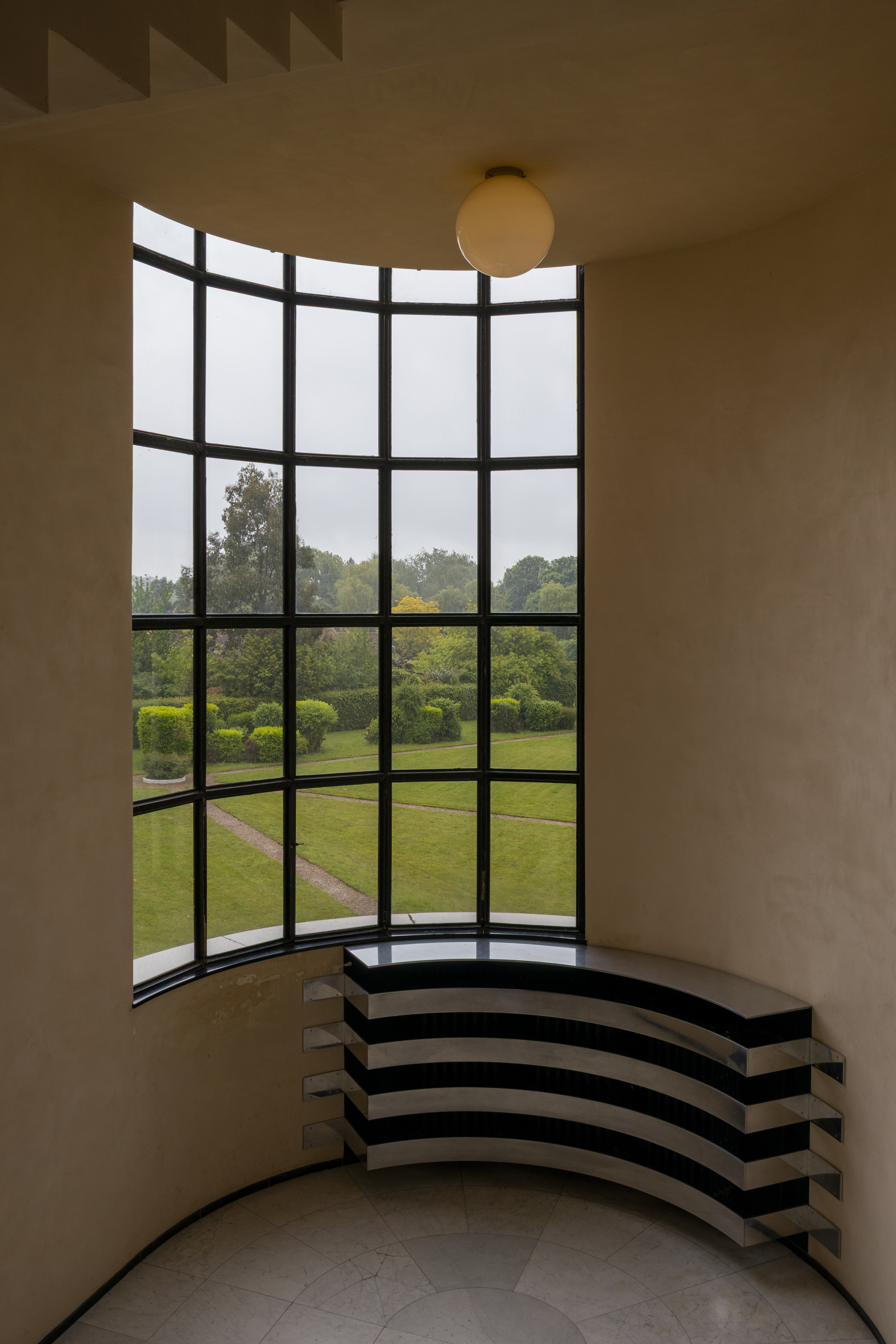
View of the gardens

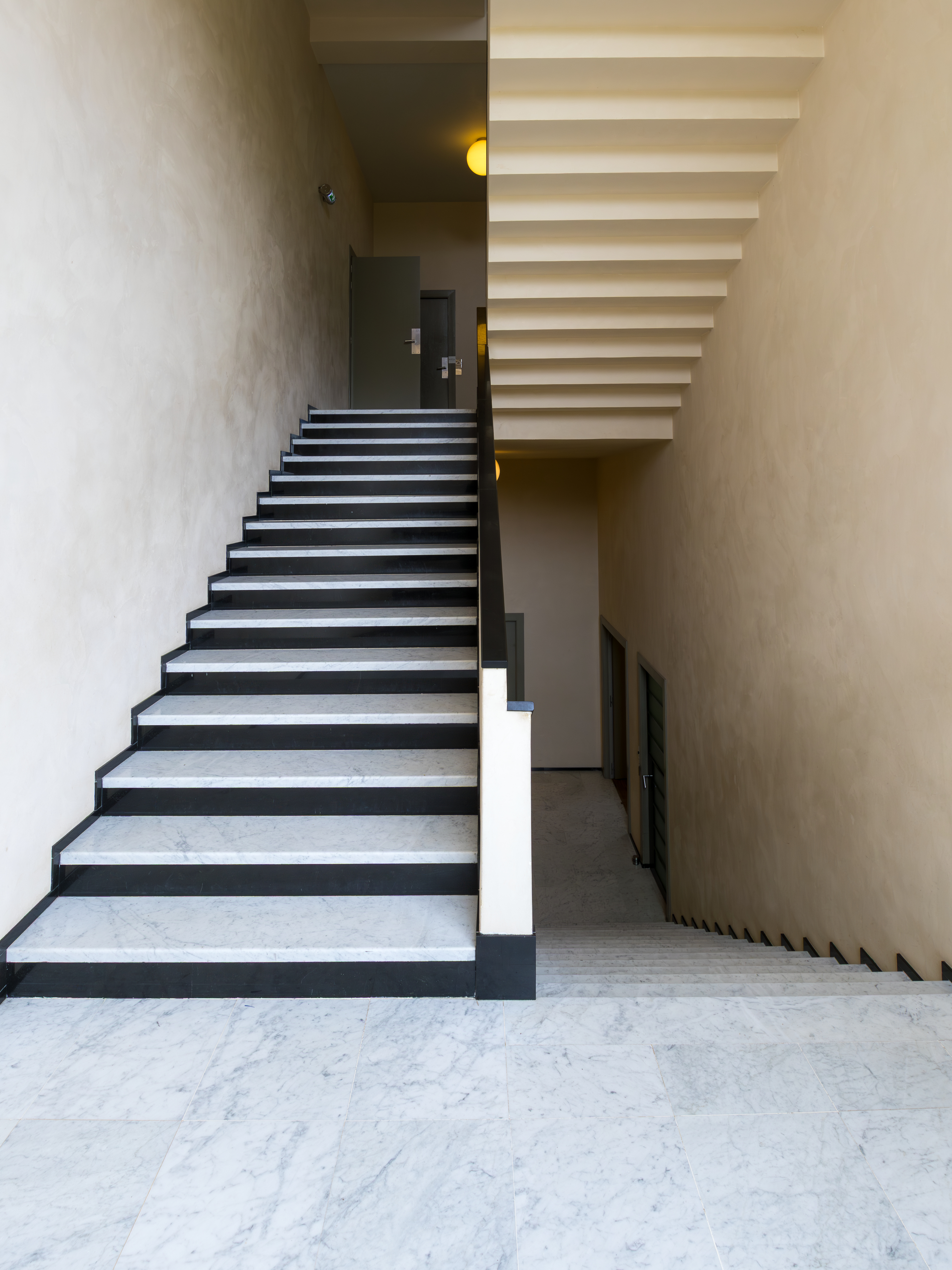

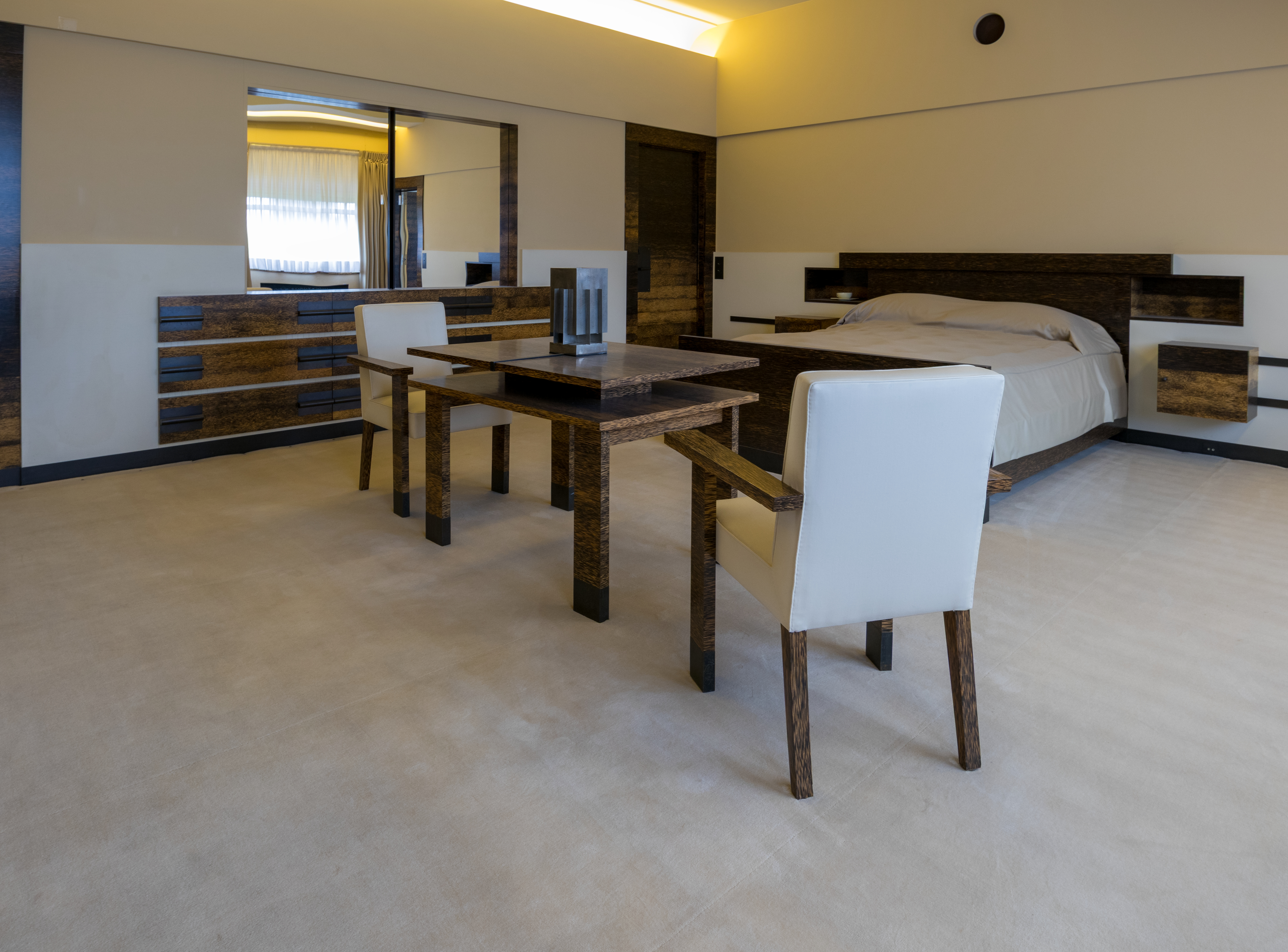
Master bedroom

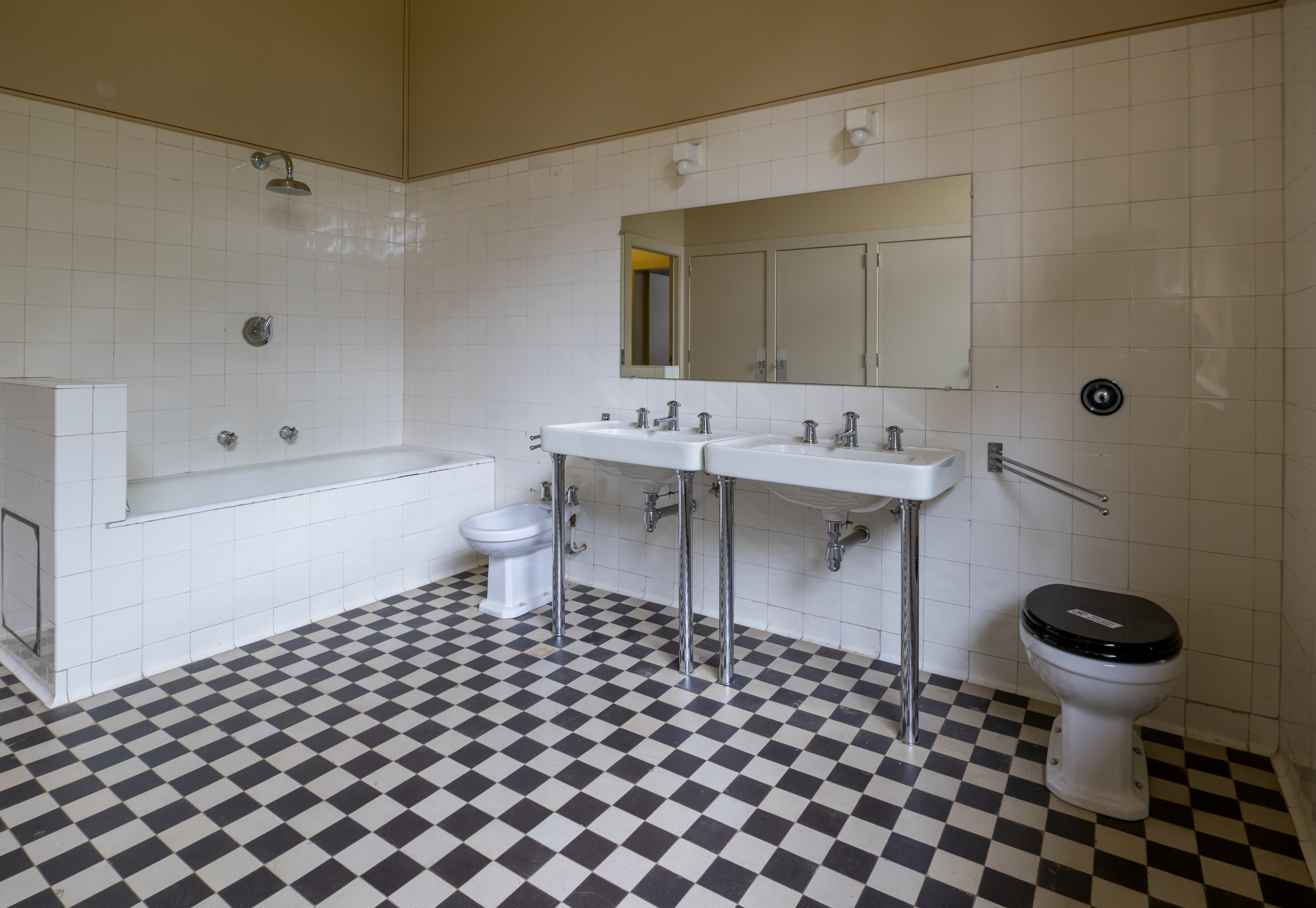
Bathrooms

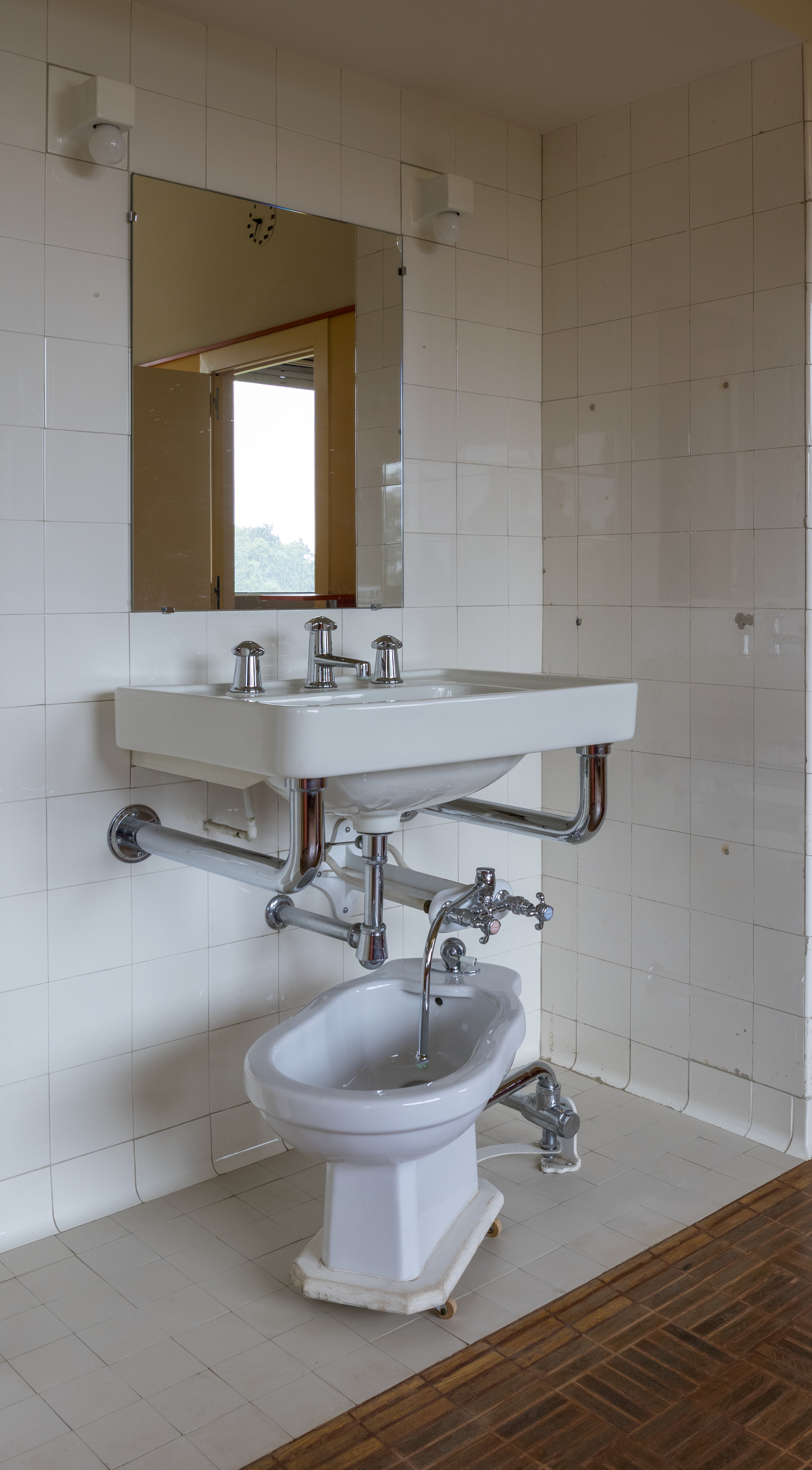
Bathrooms

== See also ==
- Villa Paul Poiret
- Villa Noailles
- Robert Mallet-Stevens

== Literature ==
- Parsy P-H, (2015), The Villa Cavrois Editions du patrimoine, Paris. ISBN 978-2-7577-0462-2
