= Mézy-sur-Seine =

- Commune
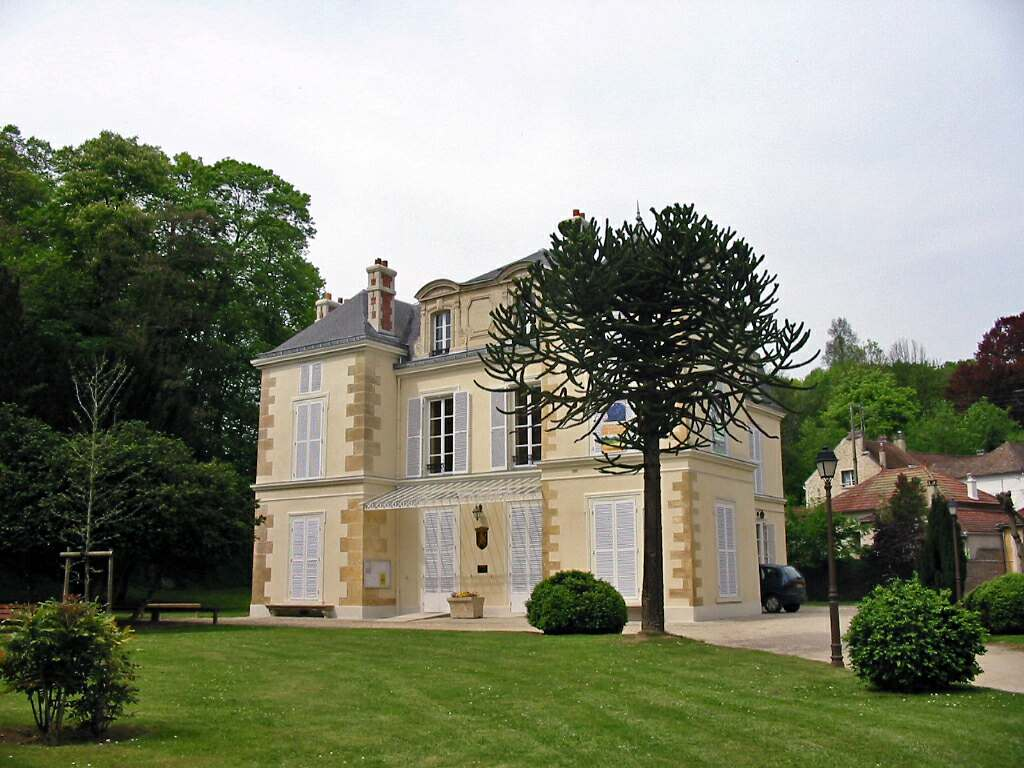
- The town hall in Mézy-sur-Seine

- Coat of arms
- Location of Mézy-sur-Seine
- Location within France Location within Île-de-France (region)
- Coordinates: 49°00′10″N 1°52′56″E
- Country: France
- Region: Île-de-France
- Department: Yvelines
- Arrondissement: Mantes-la-Jolie
- Canton: Les Mureaux
- Intercommunality: CU Grand Paris Seine et Oise

Government
  - Mayor (2020–2026): Fabrice Zuccarelli
- Area^{1}: 4.76 km^{2} (1.84 sq mi)
- Elevation: 65 m (213 ft)
- Highest elevation: 155 m (509 ft)
- Lowest elevation: 17 m (56 ft)
- Population (2023): 2,242
  - Density: 471/km^{2} (1,220/sq mi)
- Time zone: UTC+01:00 (CET)
  - Summer (DST): UTC+02:00 (CEST)
- INSEE/Postal code: 78403 /78250
- ^{1} French Land Register data, which excludes lakes, ponds, glaciers > 1 km^{2} (0.386 sq mi or 247 acres) and river estuaries.

Mézy-sur-Seine (French pronunciation: [mezi syʁ sɛn]; lit. 'Mézy-on-Seine') is a commune in the Yvelines department in the Île-de-France region in north-central France.

== Population ==
Historical population
| Year | Pop. | ±% p.a. |
|---|---|---|
| 1968 | 964 | — |
| 1975 | 1,346 | +4.88% |
| 1982 | 1,417 | +0.74% |
| 1990 | 1,698 | +2.29% |
| 1999 | 1,789 | +0.58% |
| 2007 | 1,908 | +0.81% |
| 2012 | 1,984 | +0.78% |
| 2017 | 2,197 | +2.06% |
| 2023 | 2,242 | +0.34% |
Source: INSEE

== See also ==
- Communes of the Yvelines department
