= Gesamtkunstwerk =

'total artwork' making use of many or all art forms

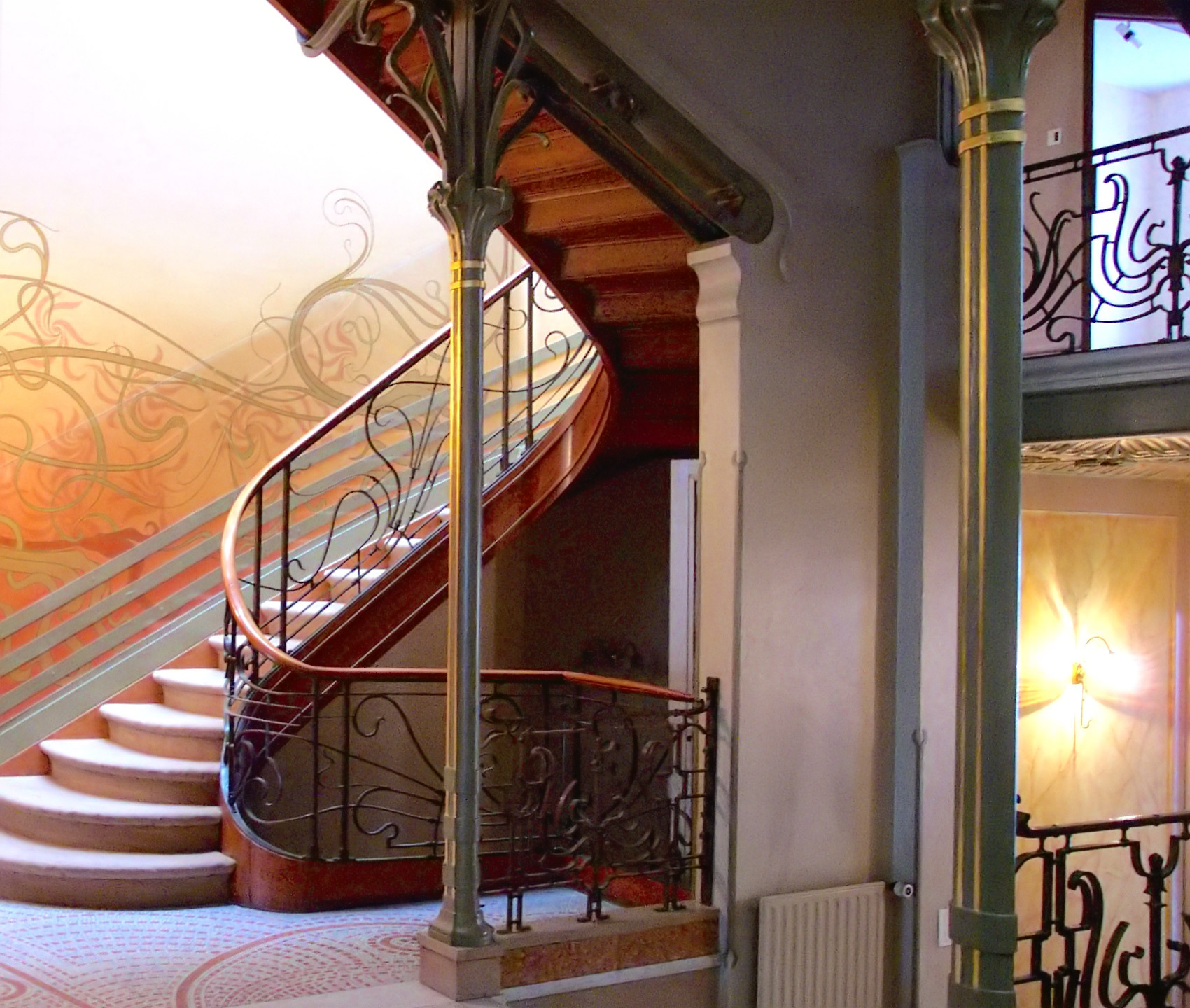
Stairway of the Hôtel Tassel, an early example of Gesamtkunstwerk

A Gesamtkunstwerk (German: [ɡəˈzamtˌkʊnstvɛʁk], 'total work of art', 'ideal work of art', 'universal artwork', 'synthesis of the arts', 'comprehensive artwork', or 'all-embracing art form') is a work of art that makes use of all or many art forms or strives to do so. The term is a German loanword accepted in English as a term in aesthetics.

== Background ==
The term was developed by the German writer and philosopher K. F. E. Trahndorff in his 1827 essay Ästhetik oder Lehre von Weltanschauung und Kunst (or 'Aesthetics, or Doctrine of Worldview and Art'). The German opera composer Richard Wagner used the term in two 1849 essays, and the word has become particularly associated with his aesthetic ideals. It is unclear whether Wagner knew of Trahndorff's essay.

In France in the mid-nineteenth century, Eugène Viollet-le-Duc was also a proponent of integrating major arts (architecture) and minor arts (decorative arts) into un art total. His ideas placed him in opposition to the principles of the Beaux Arts movement in Paris, who rejected Viollet-le-Duc's proposed educational reforms. If his ideas had little success in France, they spread around Europe through his teachings and books, particularly the drawings in his Dictionnaire raisonné de l'architecture française du XIe au XVIe siècle. This book influenced an entire span of artists and architects around the world: John Ruskin used it extensively to teach his Arts and Crafts students, including William Morris, Edward Burne-Jones, Christina Rossetti and Philip Webb; his works more broadly informed the Art Nouveau movement in Europe, and the modernists thereafter. Examples of the total art approach to architecture and design include the Tassel House (1892–3) in Brussels, designed by Victor Horta, and the Villa Cavrois (1929–32) in Croix in the Nord department, designed by Robert Mallet-Stevens.

In the 20th century, some writers applied the term to some forms of architecture, while others applied it to film and mass media.

== In opera ==
=== Before Wagner ===
Some elements of opera had begun seeking a more 'classical' formula at the end of the 18th century. After the lengthy domination of opera seria and the da capo aria, a movement began to advance the librettist and the composer in relation to the singers, and to return the drama to a more intense and less moralistic focus. This movement, 'reform opera', is primarily associated with Christoph Willibald Gluck and Ranieri de' Calzabigi. The themes in the operas produced by Gluck's collaborations with Calzabigi continue throughout the operas of Carl Maria von Weber, until Wagner, rejecting both the Italian bel canto tradition and the French 'spectacle opera', developed his union of music, drama, theatrical effects, and occasionally dance.

However, these trends had developed fortuitously, rather than in response to a specific philosophy of art. Wagner, who recognised the reforms of Gluck and admired the works of Weber, originally wished to consolidate his view as part of his radical social and political views of the late 1840s. Previous to Wagner, others had expressed ideas about union of the arts, which was a familiar topic among German Romantics, as evidenced by the title of Trahndorff's essay, 'Aesthetics, or Theory of Philosophy of Art'. Others who wrote on syntheses of the arts included Gotthold Ephraim Lessing, Ludwig Tieck and Novalis. Carl Maria von Weber's enthusiastic review of E.T.A. Hoffmann's opera Undine (1816) admired it as 'an art work complete in itself, in which partial contributions of the related and collaborating arts blend together, disappear, and, in disappearing, somehow form a new world'.

=== Wagner's ideas ===
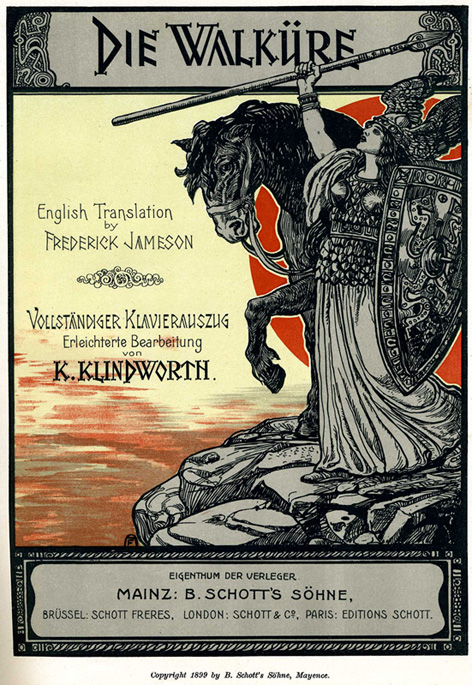
Score for Die Walküre; the Ring cycle was Wagner's most complete articulation of his idea of Gesamtkunstwerk.

Wagner used the exact term Gesamtkunstwerk (which he spelt 'Gesammtkunstwerk') on only two occasions, in his 1849 essays 'Art and Revolution' and 'The Artwork of the Future', where he speaks of his ideal of unifying all works of art via the theatre. He also used in these essays many similar expressions such as 'the consummate artwork of the future' and 'the integrated drama', and frequently referred to 'Gesamtkunst'. Such a work of art was to be the clearest and most profound expression of folk legend.

Wagner felt that the Greek tragedies of Aeschylus had been the finest (though still flawed) examples so far of total artistic synthesis, but that this synthesis had subsequently been corrupted by Euripides. Wagner felt that during the rest of human history up to the present day (i.e. 1850) the arts had drifted further and further apart, resulting in such 'monstrosities' as Grand Opera. Wagner felt that such works celebrated bravura singing, sensational stage effects, and meaningless plots. In 'Art and Revolution', Wagner applies the term Gesamtkunstwerk in the context of Greek tragedy. In 'The Art-Work of the Future', he uses it to apply to his own, as yet unrealized, ideal.

In his extensive book Opera and Drama (completed in 1851), Wagner takes these ideas further, describing in detail his idea of the union of opera and drama (later called music drama despite Wagner's disapproval of the term), in which the individual arts are subordinated to a common purpose.

Wagner's own opera cycle Der Ring des Nibelungen, specifically its components Das Rheingold and Die Walküre, represent perhaps the closest he, or anyone else, came to realizing these ideals. After this stage, Wagner came to relax his own strictures and write more conventionally 'operatically'.

== In architecture ==
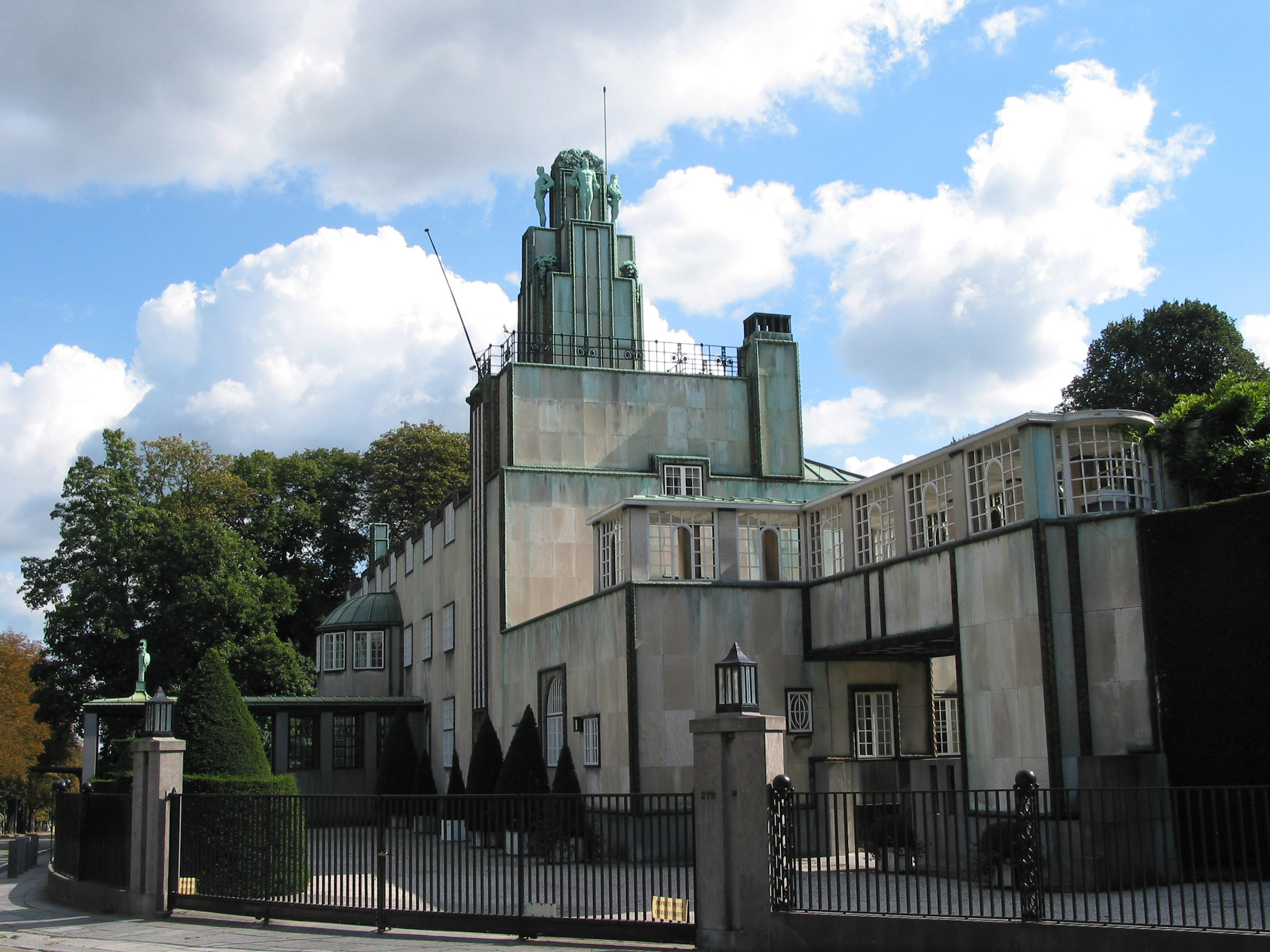
Stoclet Palace, 1905–1911

Some architectural writers have used the term Gesamtkunstwerk to signify circumstances where an architect is responsible for the design and/or overseeing of the building's totality: shell, accessories, furnishings, and landscape. It is difficult to make a claim for when the term Gesamtkunstwerk was first used to refer to a building and its contents (although the term itself was not used in this context until the late 20th century); already during the Renaissance, artists such as Michelangelo saw no strict division in their tasks between architecture, interior design, sculpture, painting and even engineering.

Historian Robert L. Delevoy has argued that Art Nouveau represented an essentially decorative trend that thus lent itself to the idea of the architectural Gesamtkunstwerk. Of course, it is equally possible it was born from social theories that arose out of a fear of the rise of industrialism.

Nonetheless, evidence of complete interiors that typify the concept of Gesamtkunstwerk can be seen from some time before the 1890s. An increasing trend among architects in the 18th and 19th centuries was to control every facet of an architectural commission. As well as being responsible for the structure itself, they tried to extend their role to also include designing (or at least vetting) every aspect of the interior work. This included not only the interior architectural features but also the design of furniture, carpets, wallpaper, fabrics, light fixtures, and door-handles. Robert Adam and Augustus Welby Pugin are examples of this trend to create an overall harmonising effect which in some cases might even extend to the choice or design of table silver, china, and glassware.

=== Arts and Crafts movement ===
William Morris (1834–1896), a British textile designer, poet, novelist, translator, and socialist activist, was associated with the British Arts and Crafts movement and largely influenced by the ideas of John Ruskin, who believed that industrialization led to a qualitative decline in artistically crafted goods. Morris believed a home must nurture harmony as well as infuse its inhabitants with a creative energy.

The quote 'Have nothing in your houses that you do not know to be useful, or believe to be beautiful' epitomized Morris' way of living of Gesamtkunstwerk.

Morris' and Philip Webb's Red House, designed in 1859, is a major example, as well as the Blackwell House in the English Lake District, designed by Baillie Scott. Blackwell House was built in 1898–1900, as a holiday home for Sir Edward Holt, a wealthy Manchester brewer. It is situated near the town of Bowness-on-Windermere with views looking over Windermere and across to the Coniston Fells.

=== Art Nouveau ===
The form and ideology of Gesamtkunstwerk was regularly engaged with by the Art Nouveau artists and architects of the period. Belgians Victor Horta and Henry Van de Velde, Catalan Antoni Gaudí, French Hector Guimard, Scottish Charles Rennie Mackintosh, Austrian Josef Hoffmann, Russian-German Franz (Fyodor) Schechtel, Finn Eliel Saarinen, and many other architects also acted as furniture and interior designers.

Many Art Nouveau masterpieces were results of cooperation of artists of different fields:

- Villa Majorelle (1901–1902) in Nancy, France was created by architect Henri Sauvage, furniture designer Louis Majorelle, ceramist Alexandre Bigot, and stained glass artist Jacques Grüber.
- The Municipal House (1904–1912) in Prague, Czech Republic was designed by Osvald Polívka and Antonín Balšánek and painted by famous Czech painter Alphonse Mucha, and features sculptures of Josef Mařatka and Ladislav Šaloun.
- The Gresham Palace (1904–1906) in Budapest, Hungary was created by architects Zsigmond Quittner and Jozsef Vago; sculptors Géza Maróti, Miklós Ligeti, and Ede Telcs; stained glass artist Miksa Róth; and metalwork artist Gyula Jungfer.
- Works of Victor Horta:
  - Hôtel Tassel, Hôtel Solvay, and Hôtel van Eetvelde were created in cooperation with stained glass master Raphaël Évaldre.
  - Maison and Atelier Horta was created in cooperation with sculptor Pieter Braecke.
- Works of Lluís Domènech i Montaner: Palau de la Música Catalana and Hospital de Sant Pau in Barcelona:
  - Sculptors Pablo Gargallo and Eusebi Arnau and mosaic master Mario Maragliano took part in both projects.
  - Sculptor Miguel Blay, stained-glass designer Antoni Rigalt, and ceramist Lluis Brù i Salelles were involved in construction of Palau de la Música Catalana.
  - Metalwork artist Josep Perpinyà was involved in construction of Hospital de Sant Pau.
- Works of Antoni Gaudí: Park Güell, Palau Güell, Sagrada Família, Casa Batlló, Casa Milá, and Casa Vicens in Barcelona and Colònia Güell in Santa Coloma de Cervelló:
  - Mosaic master Mario Maragliano was involved in construction of Sagrada Família.
  - Architect Francesc Berenguer i Mestres was involved in construction of Sagrada Família and Colònia Güell,
  - Architect Joan Rubió was involved in construction of Sagrada Família, Casa Batlló, and Parc Güell.
  - Multi-disciplinary artist Josep Maria Jujol helped Gaudí with Casa Batlló, Casa Milà, and Parc Güell.
- Stoclet Palace in Brussels was created by architect and designer Josef Hoffmann, painters Gustav Klimt and Fernand Khnopff, sculptor Franz Metzner, and mosaic master Leopold Forstner. The construction of the palace foreshadowed Art Deco and Modern architecture.
- Museum Villa Stuck is the work of artist Franz von Stuck and 'was celebrated as a marvelously modern yet curious construction. Built along his guiding principle of the Gesamtkunstwerk the Villa Stuck combined all aspects of architecture, art, music, theatre, and life within its walls and garden'.
- In Switzerland, Bruno Weber Park, a sculpture garden by artist Bruno Weber, is a later example of an Art Nouveau piece inspired by Gesamtkunstwerk.
- Kirche am Steinhof, or the Church of St. Leopold, was designed by the architect Otto Wagner. It is the Roman Catholic oratory of the Steinhof Psychiatric Hospital in Vienna, Austria. The building is considered one of the most important Art Nouveau churches in the world. Dedicated to Saint Leopold, it was built between 1903 and 1907, and includes mosaics and stained glass by Koloman Moser, and sculptures of angels by Othmar Schimkowitz. The great majority of the other smaller details are the work of Otto Wagner himself. The statues on the two external towers represent Saint Leopold on the left and Saint Severin on the right, the two patron saints of Lower Austria, and are the work of the Viennese sculptor Richard Luksch.
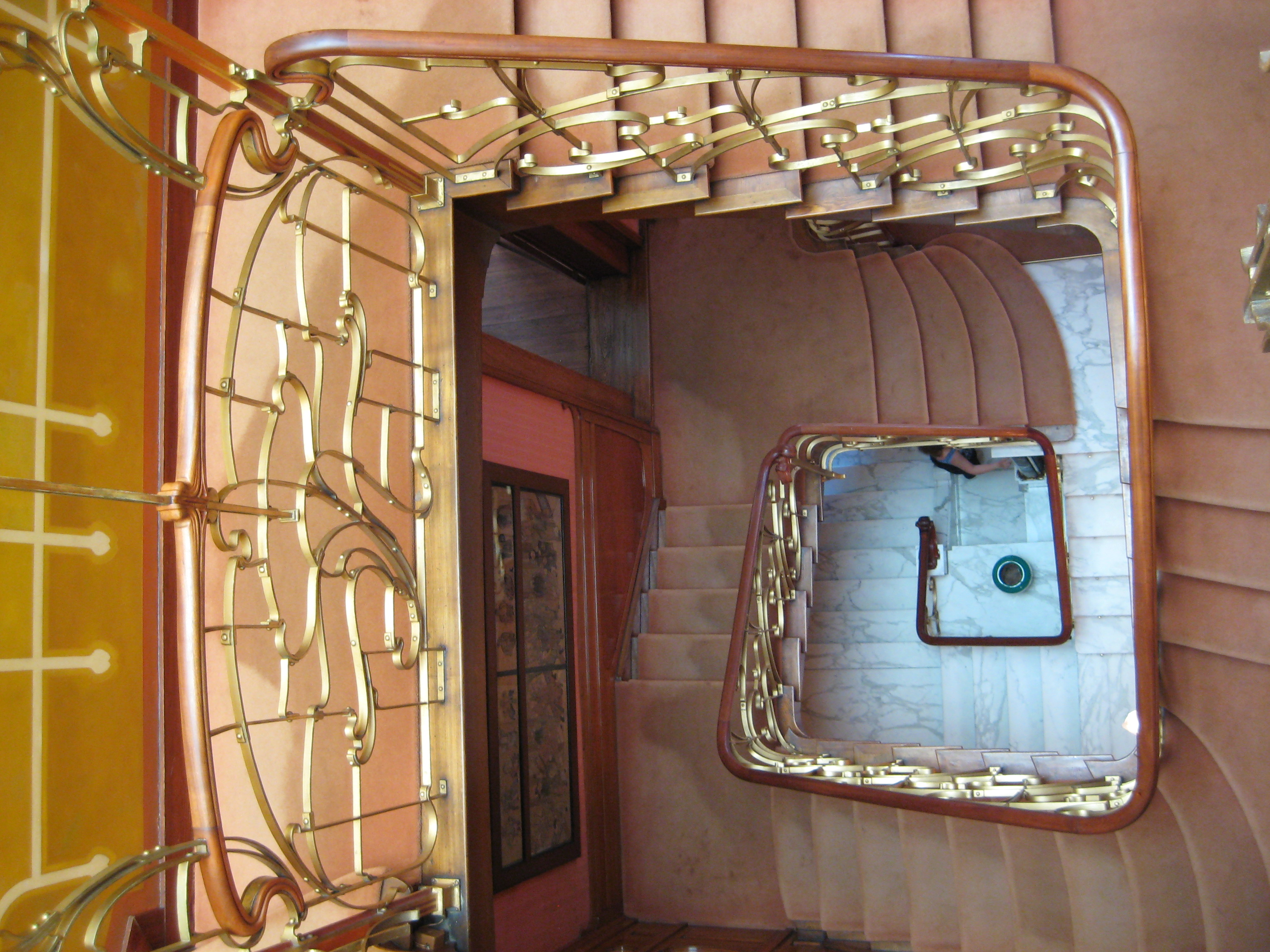
Spiral staircase in Maison and Atelier Horta by Victor Horta in Brussels (1898-1901)

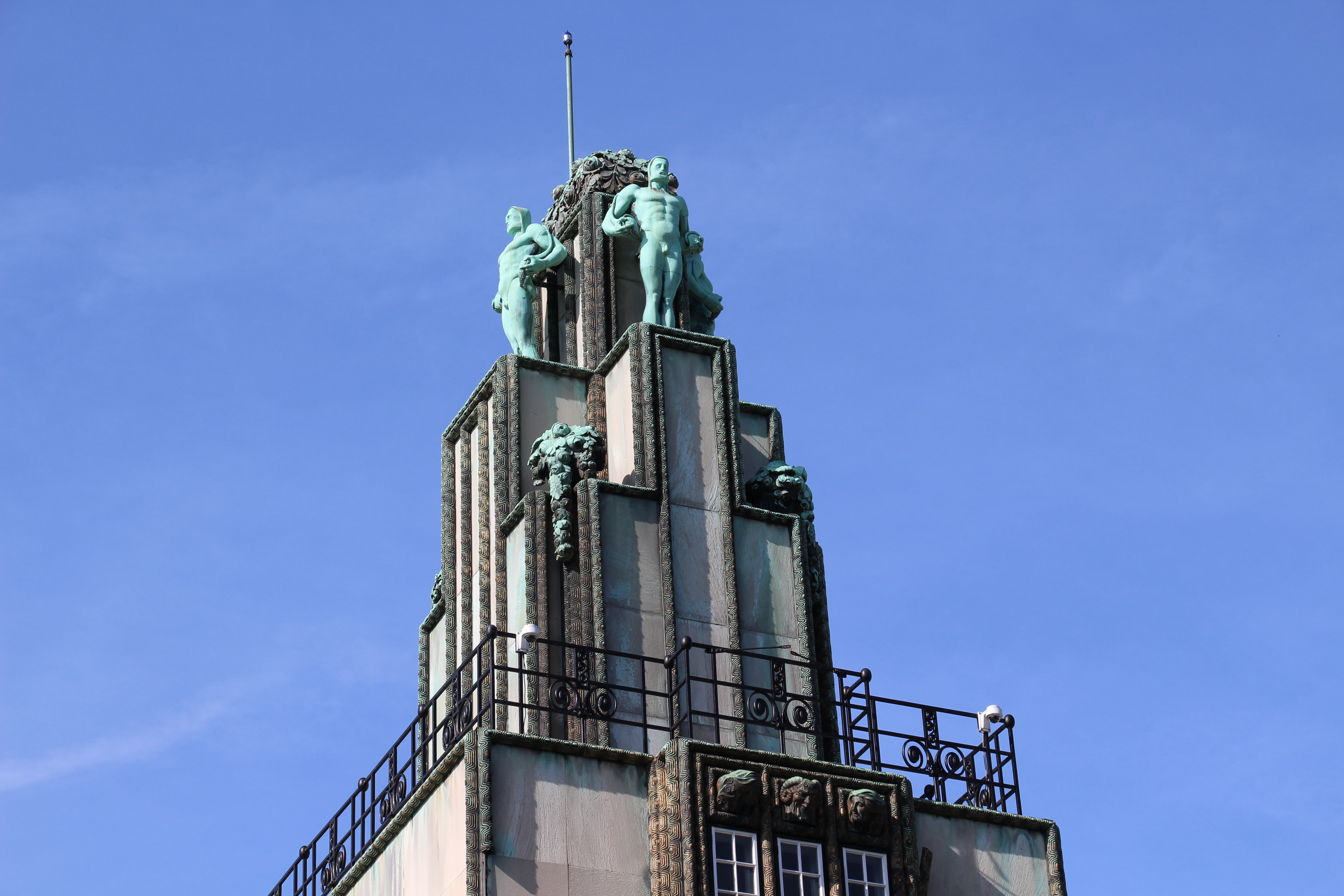
Detail of Stoclet Palace in Brussels (1905-1911)

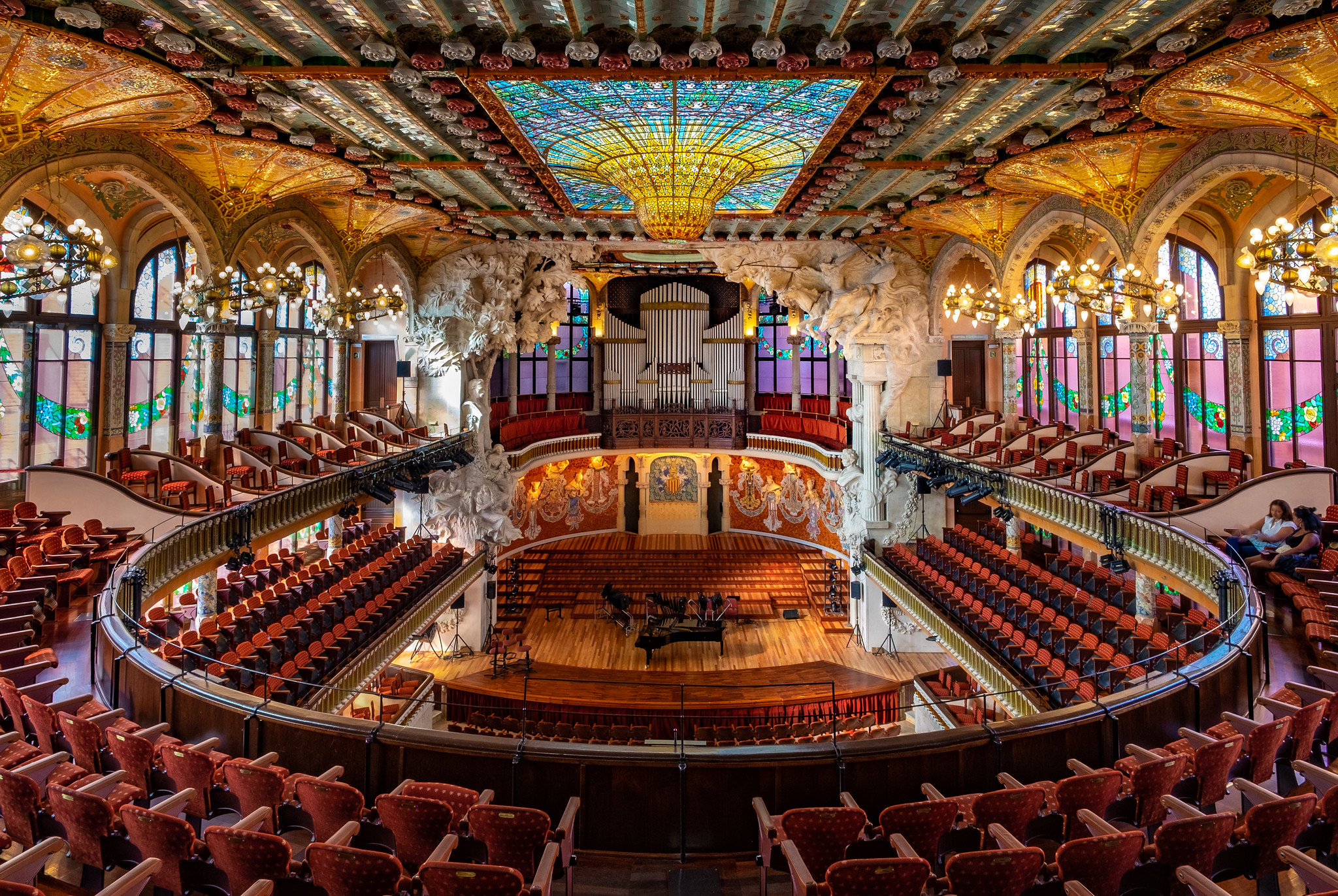
Interior of Palau de la Música Catalana in Barcelona (1905-1909)

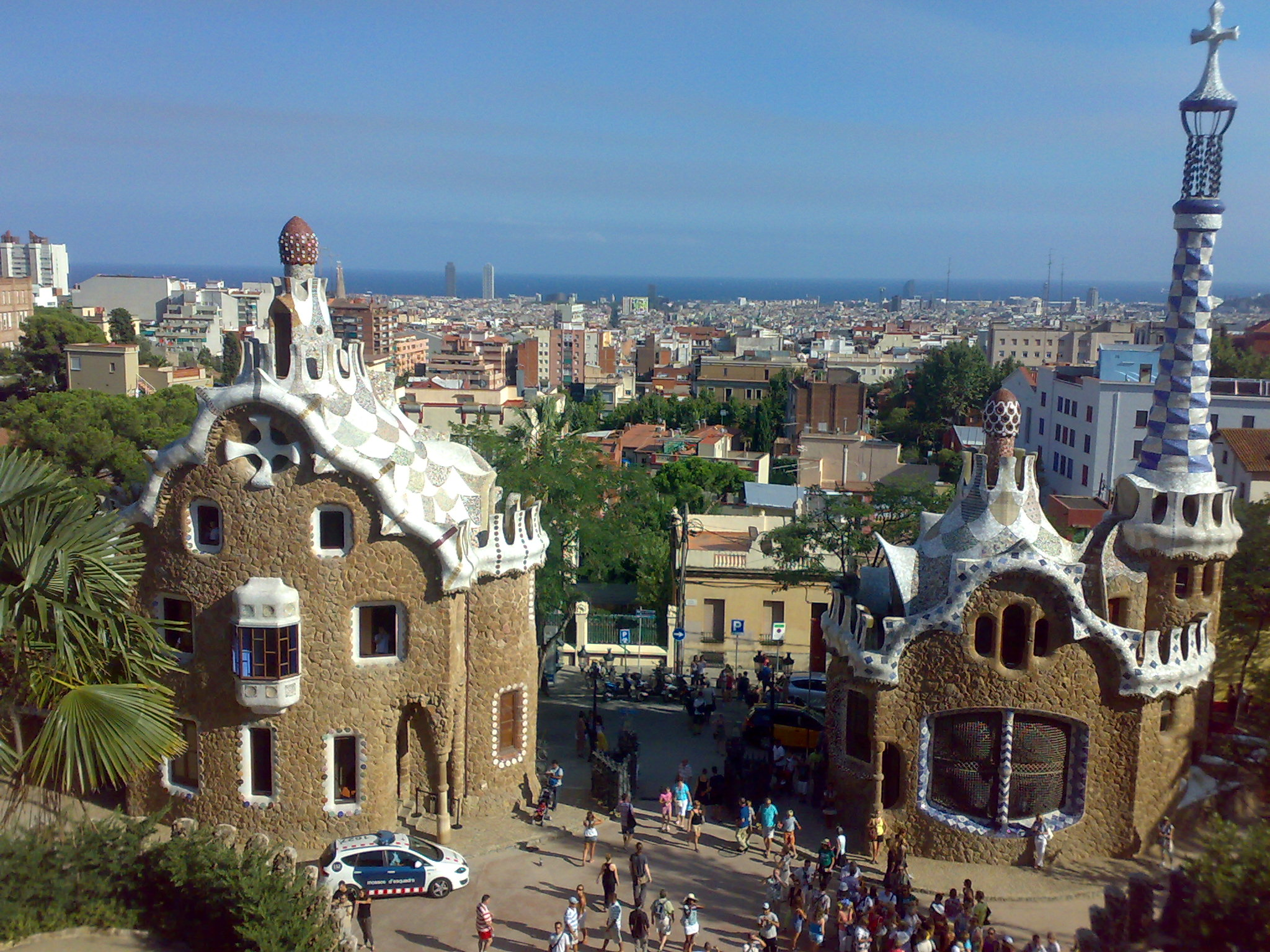
Entrance buildings in Parc Güell by Antoni Gaudí in Barcelona (1900-1914)

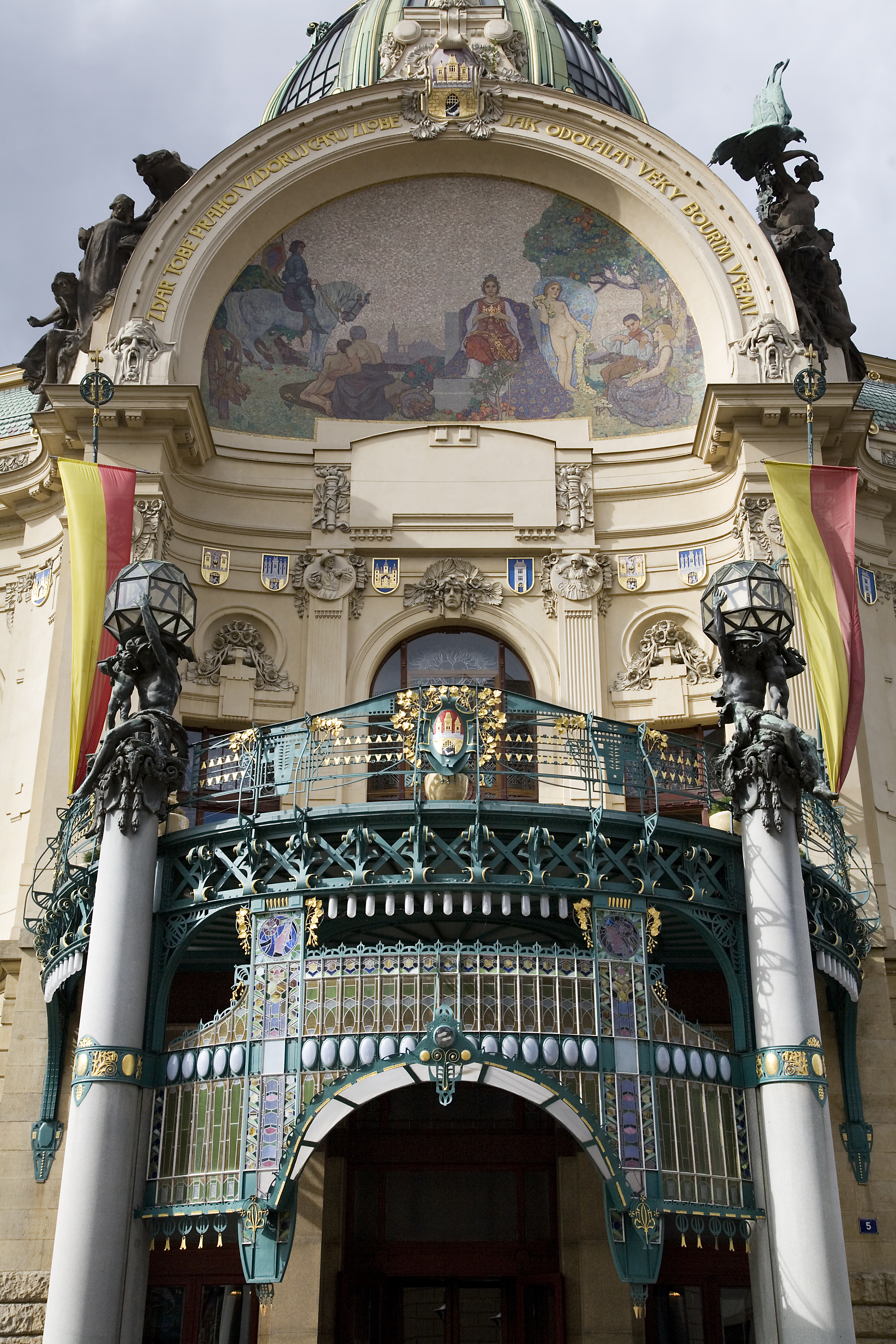
Main entrance of the Municipal House in Prague

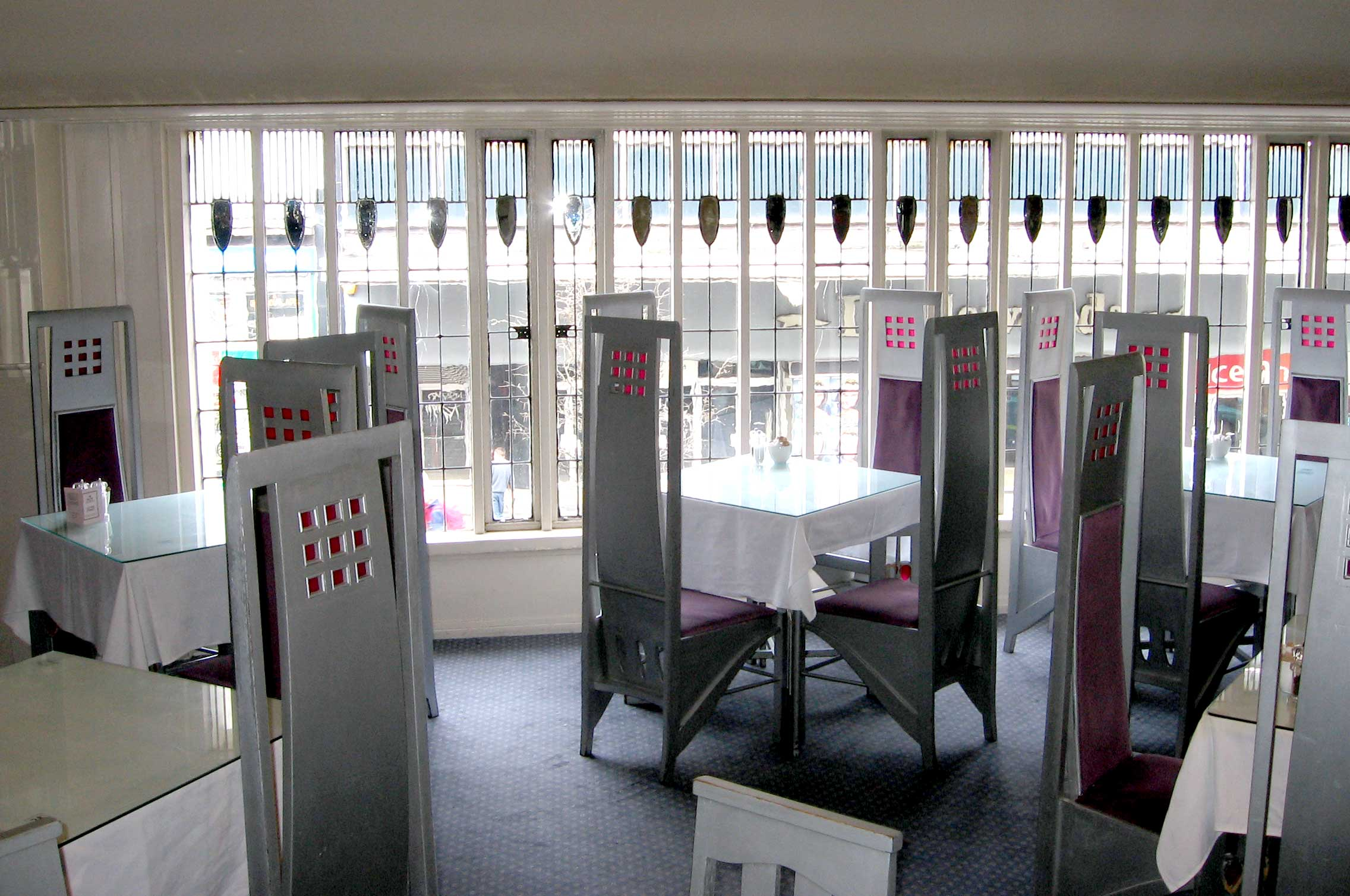
Interior of Willow Tearooms by Charles Rennie Mackintosh, in Glasgow

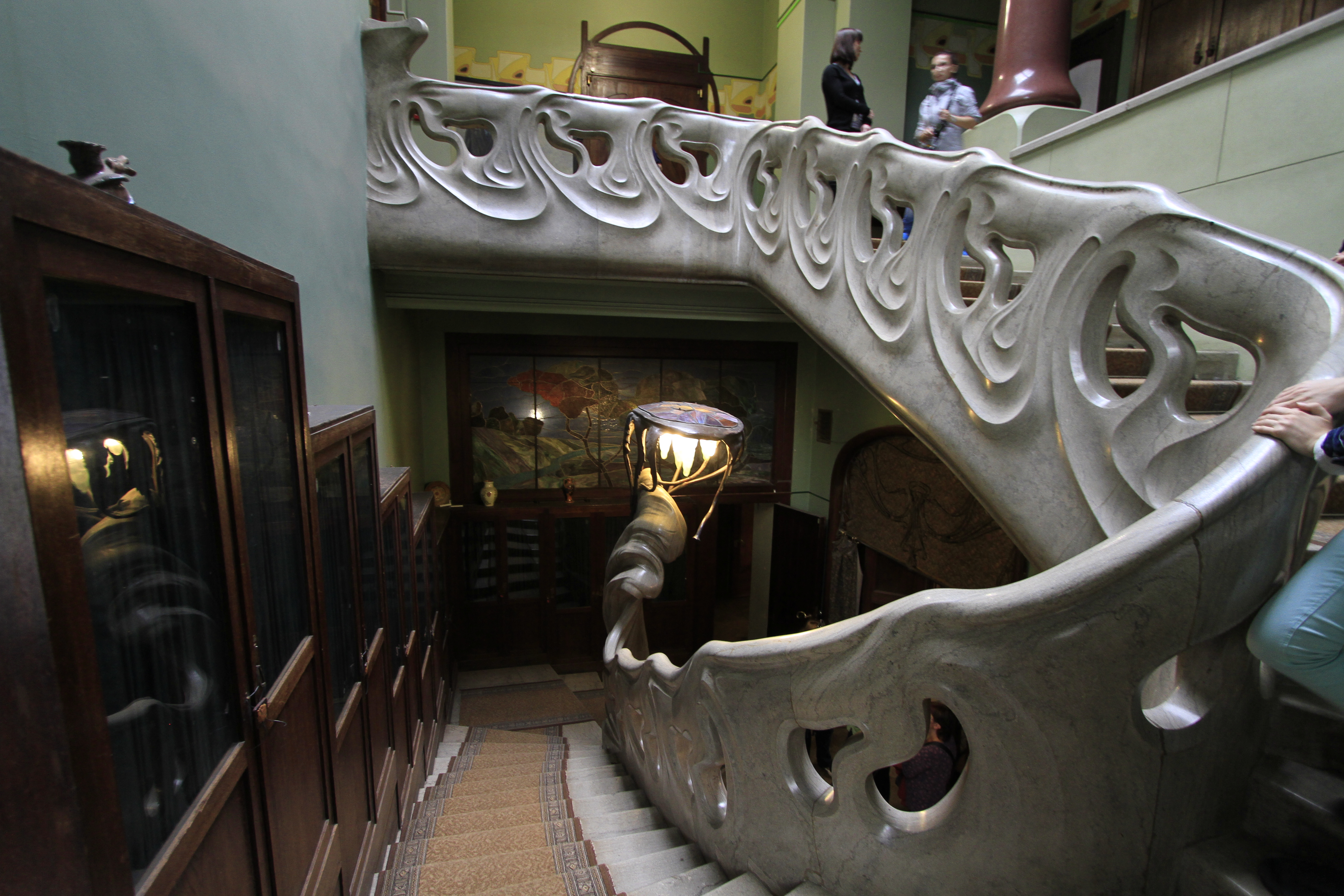
Interior of Gorky Museum by Franz (Fyodor) Schechtel in Moscow

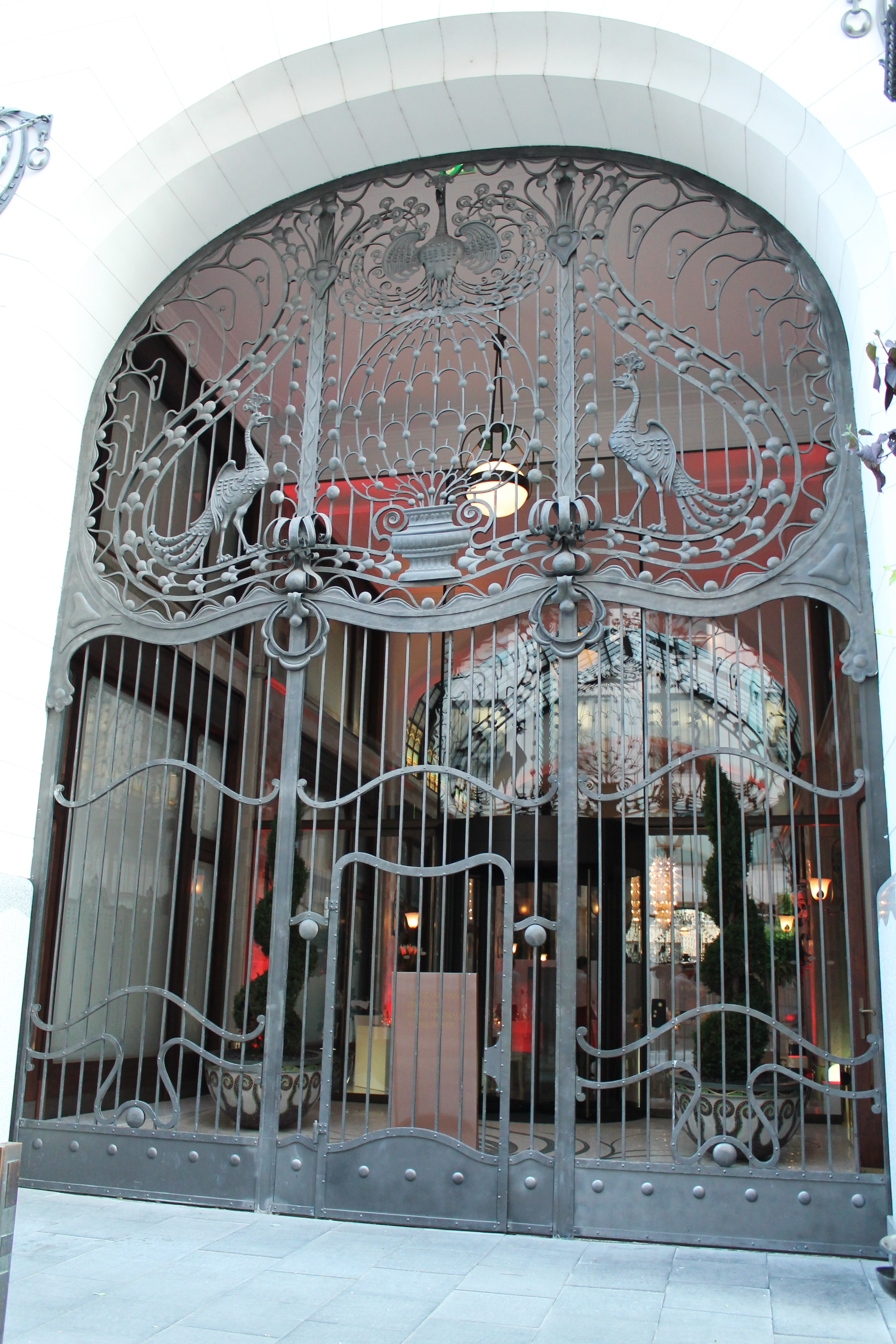
The Gresham Palace in Budapest

=== Modernism ===
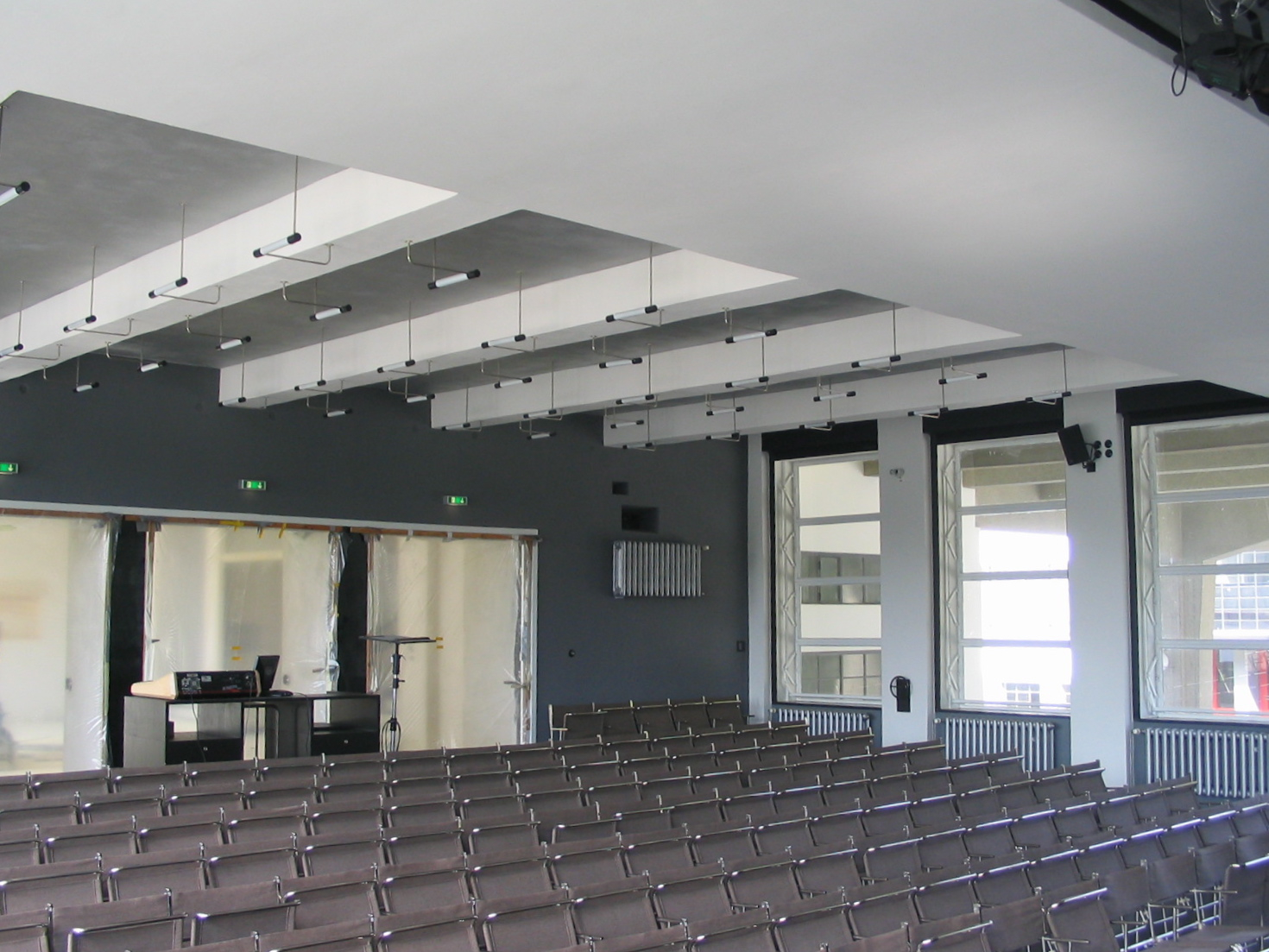
A room of the Bauhaus campus, Dessau: the Bauhaus was especially interested in Gesamtkunstwerk.

The architectural movement of Modernism also saw architects implementing this principle of Gesamtkunstwerk. Centre Le Corbusier is an example by famed Modernist architect Le Corbusier. The Villa Cavrois mansion in France is another example of modernist Gesamtkunstwerk, designed by French architect Robert Mallet-Stevens.

== In art ==
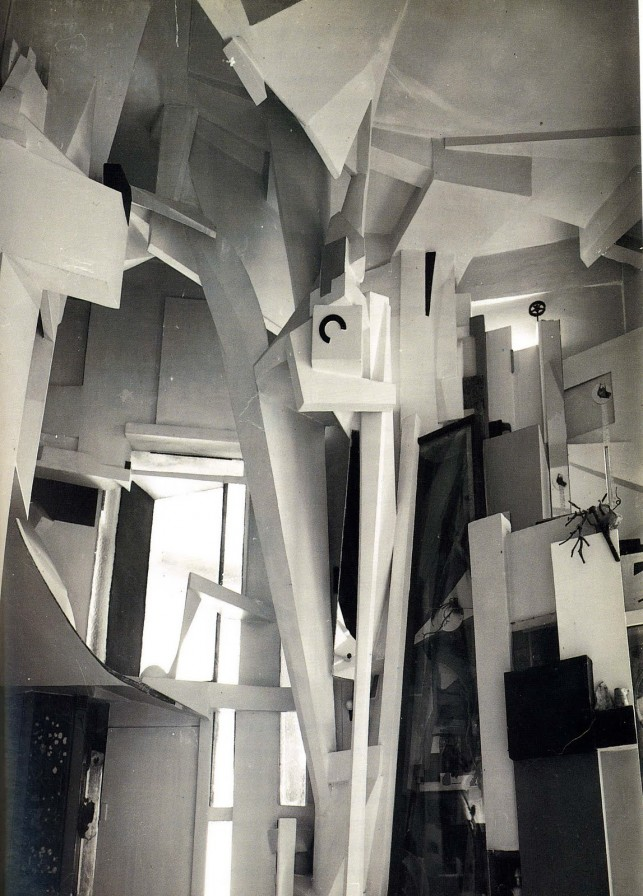
Hanover Merzbau, a mixed media installation by Dadaist Kurt Schwitters in his apartment, Hanover, 1933

The multi-media style pioneered by Dadaists such as Hugo Ball has also been called a Gesamtkunstwerk. 'Towards the Merz Gesamtkunstwerk' was a University of Oregon graduate seminar that explored themes of Dadaism and Gesamtkunstwerk, especially Kurt Schwitter's legendary Merzbau. They cite Richard Huelsenbeck in his German Dada Manifesto: 'Life appears as a simultaneous confusion of noises, colours and spiritual rhythms, and is thus incorporated — with all the sensational screams and feverish excitements of its audacious everyday psyche and the entirety of its brutal reality — unwaveringly into Dadaist art'.

In 2011, Saatchi Gallery in London held Gesamtkunstwerk: New Art from Germany, a survey exhibition of 24 contemporary German artists.

An exhibition entitled Utopia Gesamtkunstwerk, curated by Bettina Steinbrügge and Harald Krejci, took place from January to May 2012 at the 21er Haus in Belvedere, Vienna. It was a 'contemporary perspective of the historical idea of the total work of art' and included a display by Esther Stocker based on the idea of 'the untidy nursery', it housed works by Joseph Beuys, Monica Bonvicini, Christian Boltanski, Marcel Broodthaers, Daniel Buren, Heinz Emigholz, Valie Export, Claire Fontaine, gelatin, Isa Genzken, Liam Gillick, Thomas Hirschhorn, Ilya Kabakov, Martin Kippenberger, Gordon Matta-Clark, Paul McCarthy, Superflex, Franz West, and numerous others. An accompanying book exploring the topic was produced with the same name.

Many reviews have characterized the contemporary art exhibition the 9th Berlin Biennale as a Gesamtkunstwerk.

In 2017, visual artists Shirin Neshat and William Kentridge directed operas at the Salzburg Festival, which writer Naomi Rea considered part of a movement of artists returning to the concept of the Gesamtkuntswerk, along with other contemporary artists including Jonathan Meese and Tino Sehgal.

== Other applications ==
The Catholic Mass has been cited as an example of a Gesamtkunstwerk, and one could consider various liturgical expressions to be similar examples. Beyoncé has created multiple works that have been considered examples of Gesamtkunstwerk.

Canadian development corporation Westbank, founded by Ian Gillespie, uses Gesamtkunstwerk as the founding idea behind the company's vision and philosophy for urban development.

== Bibliography ==
- Bergande, Wolfram: 'The creative destruction of the total work of art. From Hegel to Wagner and beyond', in: Ruhl (Ed.): The death and life of the total work of art, Berlin: Jovis, 2014
- Finger, Anke and Danielle Follett (eds.) (2011) The Aesthetics of the Total Artwork: On Borders and Fragments, The Johns Hopkins University Press
- Grey, Thomas S. (ed.) (2008) The Cambridge Companion to Wagner, Cambridge University Press. ISBN 978-0-521-64439-6
- Koss, Juliet (2010) Modernism After Wagner, University of Minnesota Press, ISBN 978-0-8166-5159-7
- Krejci, Harald, Agnes Arco, and Bettina Steinbrügge. Utopia Gesamtkunstwerk. Köln: Verlag der Buchhandlung Walther König, 2012. ISBN 9783863351403
- Millington, Barry (ed.) (1992) The Wagner Compendium: A Guide to Wagner's Life and Music. Thames and Hudson Ltd., London. ISBN 0-02-871359-1
- Millington, Barry (n.d.) 'Gesamtkunstwerk', in Oxford Music Online (subscription only) (consulted 15 September 2010)
- Roberts, David (2011) 'The Total Work of Art in European Modernism', Cornell University Press, Ithaca, NY
- Trahndorff, Karl Friedrich Eusebius (1827) Ästhetik oder Lehre von Weltanschauung und Kunst
- Wagner, Richard (1993), tr. W. Ashton Ellis The Art-Work of the Future and Other Works. Lincoln and London, ISBN 0-8032-9752-1
- Warrack, John (n.d.) 'Gesamtkunstwerk' in The Oxford Companion to Music online, (subscription only) (consulted 15 September 2019)
