= Central Café =

- Centrál Kávéház
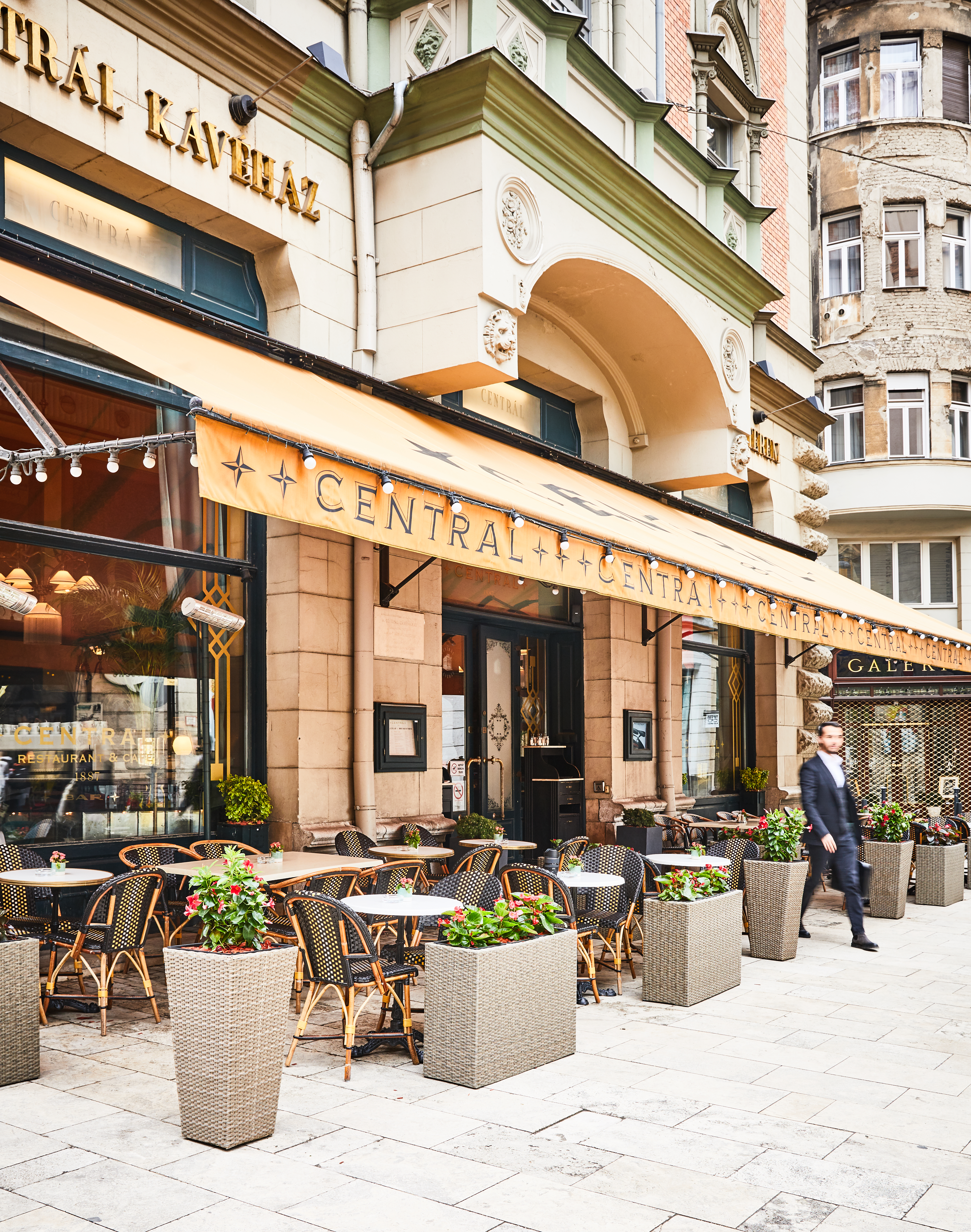
- Central Cafe in Budapest, Hungary

- Location within Hungary

General information
- Location: Károlyi utca 9, Budapest, Hungary
- Coordinates: 47°29′31.5″N 19°03′24.8″E
- Opened: 1887

Central Café is an historical landmark and an active Cafe located in the Belváros-Lipótváros region of Budapest, on Károlyi street 9.

== History ==
The Central Cafe was opened in 1887, at the house of Lajos Erényi Ullmann. The cafe was considered as one of the most advanced of his time, presenting state of the art electrical lighting, ventilation systems and heating. The architectural designs were prepared by Zsigmond Quittner. The cafe itself is located on the ground floor of the building. The artist Robert Scholtz decorated the ceiling and walls.

During World War II, although Jewish owned, because of the appointment of a Christian manager, the Central Cafe remained operational.

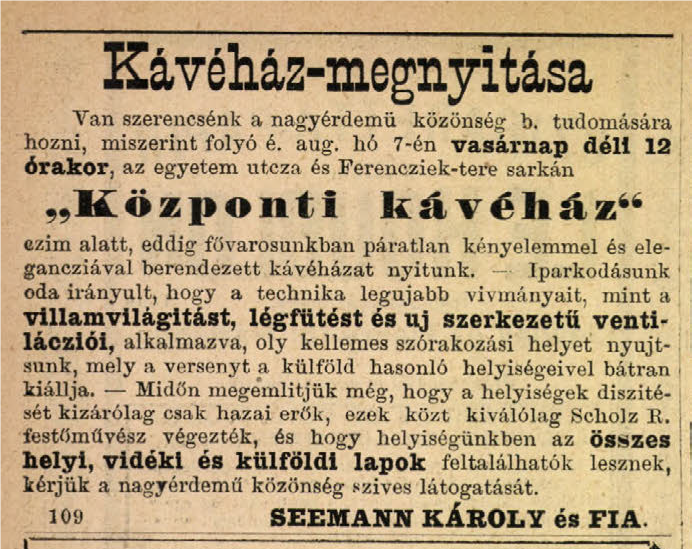
News clip from the 7 August 1887 Borsszem Jankó Hungarian daily newspaper, announcing the opening of Central Cafe

== Cultural significance ==
Since the very opening, due to its adjacency to the Budapest University Library, it served as a cultural nexus and an agreed upon meeting place among multiple parties from the university and the other cultural elite of the time. It was common to see advertisements announcing meeting and discussions to take place at the Central Cafe, as well as for political rallies and even politically motivated fist fights to take place at the Central Cafe and the adjacent square.

Many civil and political organizations were formed and were operating from the cafe. By the end of 1918, the Hungarian Socialist Democratic party was found and set up its party headquarters in one of the Central's rooms. On 21 May 1926, the National Association of Unemployed Officers was formed. On 5 July 1930, the National Association of Tobacco Sellers was formed.

As a place of fun and relaxation, it was avant-garde and was among the first places to introduce a local jazz band into the musical repertoire.

Frigyes Karinthy, the notable Hungarian writer has written his 6 degrees of separation theory at the Central, a full sized photograph of his sitting in the Central was presented in his favourite booth until 2022. Gyula Krúdy, the Hungarian journalist and writer wrote his Sinbad themed stories in the Central.

== In popular culture ==
- In the 2017 movie Atomic Blonde, the seduction scene between Charlize Theron and Sofia Bouttela takes place at the Central's bar, whose logo can be seen inscribed on it.

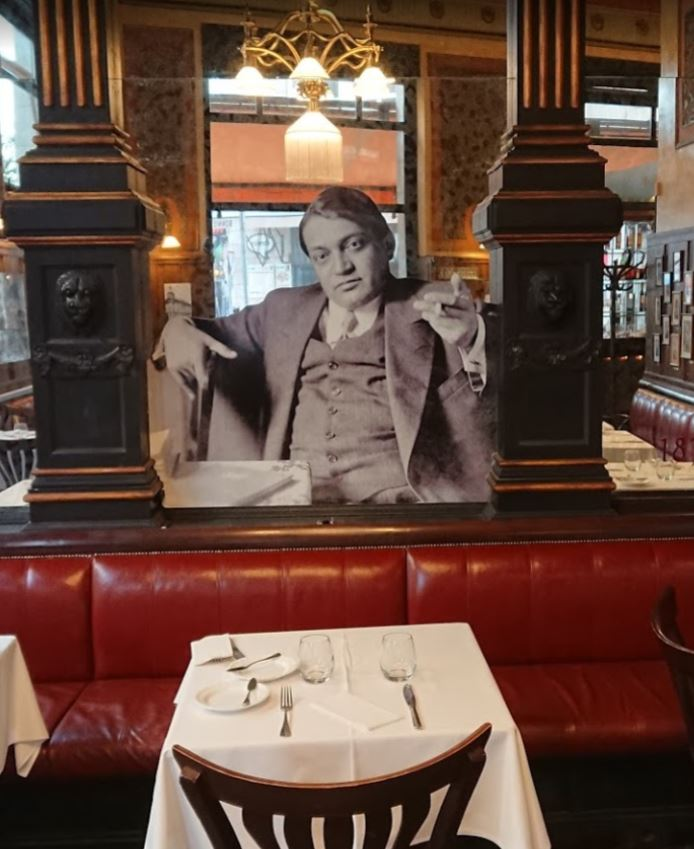
Endre Ady, sitting at his favorite booth in the Central Cafe

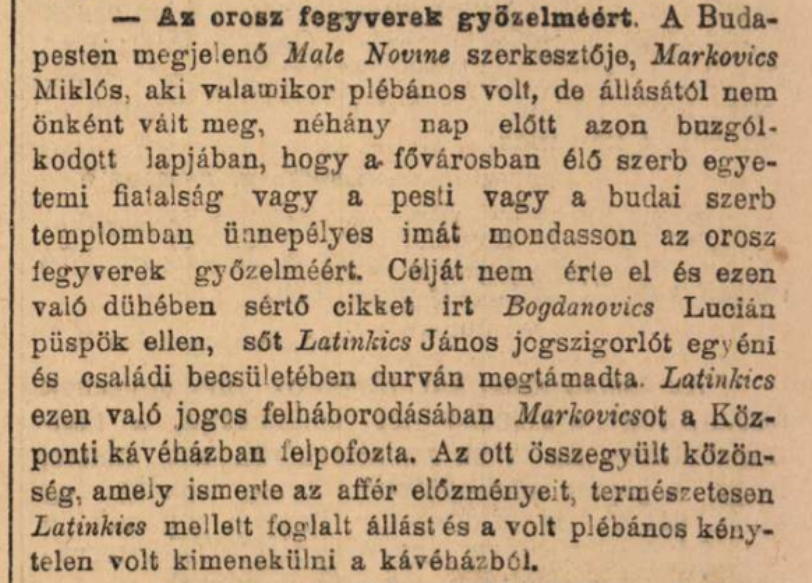
An excerpt from the Budapesti Napló, 6 March 1904, describing the fist fight between Russian sympathizers and Serbian nationals inside the Central Cafe
