= Karl Friedrich Eusebius Trahndorff =

German philosopher and theologian

Karl Friedrich Eusebius Trahndorff (aka Carl Friedrich Eusebius Trahndorff) (18 October 1782 – 15 February 1863) was a German philosopher and theologian.

== Life ==
He was born in Berlin. The son of a musician, from the age of twelve Trahndorff attended the school in Oels (now Oleśnica), where his father had been appointed chapel director by the Prinz von Brunswick-Lüneburg, Frederick August I. From 1801 he studied theology and philology in Königsberg, and on completion of his studies he began a career as a high-school teacher, mostly at the Friedrich-Wilhelm Gymnasium in Berlin but with several years in Białystok (1806–12).

As a religious and philosophical writer, Trahndorff belonged to the supernaturalist camp, opposed to theological rationalism and emphasizing the indeducible, supernatural and mystical nature of religious revelation, by implication minimizing the ability of human reason to grasp the content of faith. His polemical work Theos, nicht Kosmos! attempted to combat the growing popularity of Alexander von Humboldt's Kosmos, which he considered incompatible with Christian scripture.

Trahndorff's Ästhetik oder Lehre von Weltanschauung und Kunst is relevant to students of German Romanticism; it used the word Gesamtkunstwerk for what is believed to have been the first time.

== Works ==
- Der Schild des heiligen Winfried, Berlin 1825
- Ästhetik oder Lehre von Weltanschauung und Kunst 2 Bde., Berlin 1827
- Wie kann der Supranaturalismus sein Recht gegen Hegel's Religionsphilosophie behaupten?, Berlin 1840
- Schelling und Hegel oder das System Hegels als letztes Resultat des Grundirrtums in allem bisherigen Philosophieren, Berlin 1842
- Der welthistorische Zweifel, oder: Ist Gott nur Idee oder objektive Realität?, Barmen 1852
- Über die Bedeutung Berlins in der grossen Krisis unserer Zeit, Berlin 1852
- Der Mensch, das Ebenbild des dreieinigen Gottes. Versuch einer dogmatischen Berichtigung, Berlin 1853
- Der Teufel — kein dogmatisches Hirngespinst — Offenes Sendschreiben an den Herrn Dr Sydow, Prediger an der Neuen Kirche zu Berlin, Berlin 1853
- Theos, nicht Kosmos! Denkschrift als Zeugnis für die Wahrheit, Berlin 1859

== Bibliography ==
- K. F. E. Trahndorff: der Bewußtseinsphilosoph. Ein Beitrag zur Würdigung und Hochschätzung eines verklungenen Namens, ed. Julius W. von Eckardt, Halle 1878.
- Otto Liebmann (1895). "Trahndorff, Karl Friedrich Eusebius" . Allgemeine Deutsche Biographie (in German). Vol. 39. Leipzig: Duncker & Humblot. pp. 108–109.
