= Gyula Jungfer =

Hungarian artist

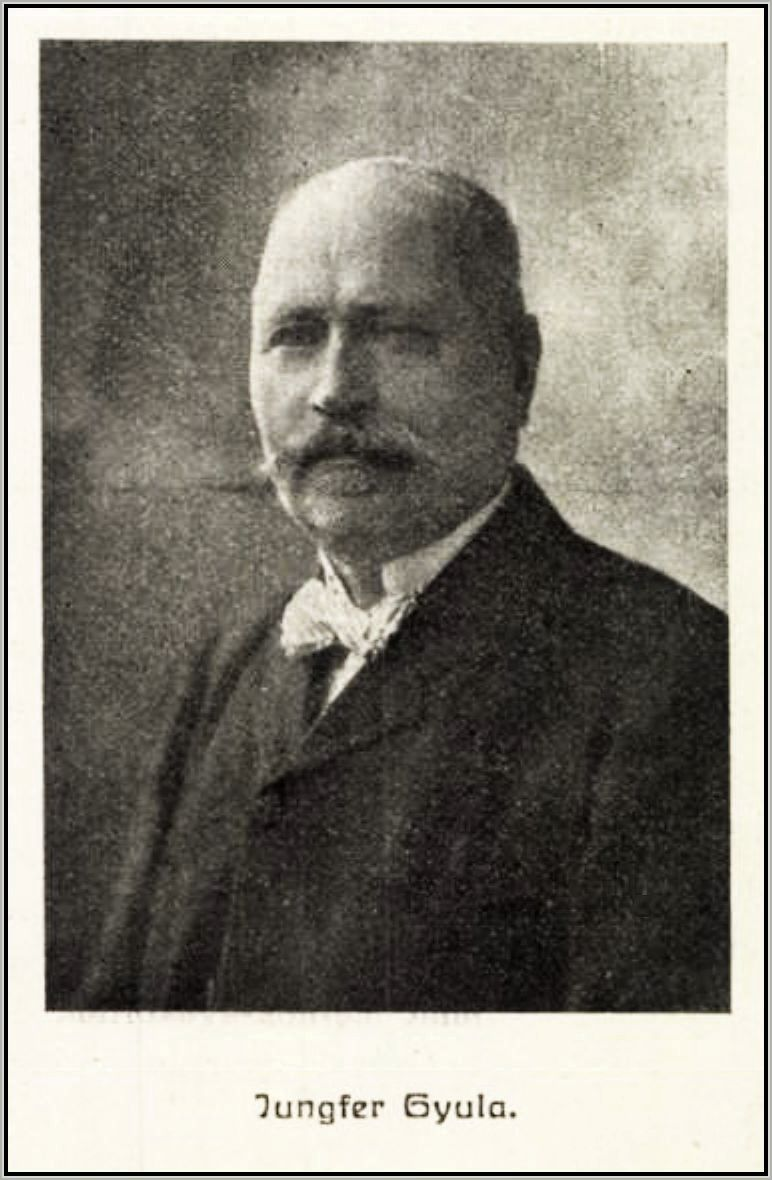
Gyula Jungfer

Gyula Jungfer (9 January 1841, in Pest – 21 November 1908, in Budapest) was a Hungarian artist working with wrought iron. He is considered one of the most important masters in decorative art in the turn-of-the-century Hungary.

== Life ==
Jungfer learned craftsmanship in his father's smithy, then he went on a grand tour around Western Europe. He came back to Pest in 1866 and opened his own workshop which soon became known for the high quality of its products and its innovative floral designs. Jungfer received many important public and private commissions during the last decades of the 19th century.

== Works ==
Jungfer made all the wrought iron works in Buda Castle, the new Hungarian Parliament Building, Hungarian State Opera House, Saint Stephen's Basilica, Keleti Railway Station, Vigadó Concert Hall and other city palaces. His most important work, the railing of Buda Castle, was destroyed during the Battle of Budapest, but it was faithfully restored in 1981. Many of his lesser works are kept in the Museum of Applied Arts in Budapest.
