= Gresham Palace =

Historic building in Budapest, Hungary

Coordinates: 47°29′59.09″N 19°2′52.73″E

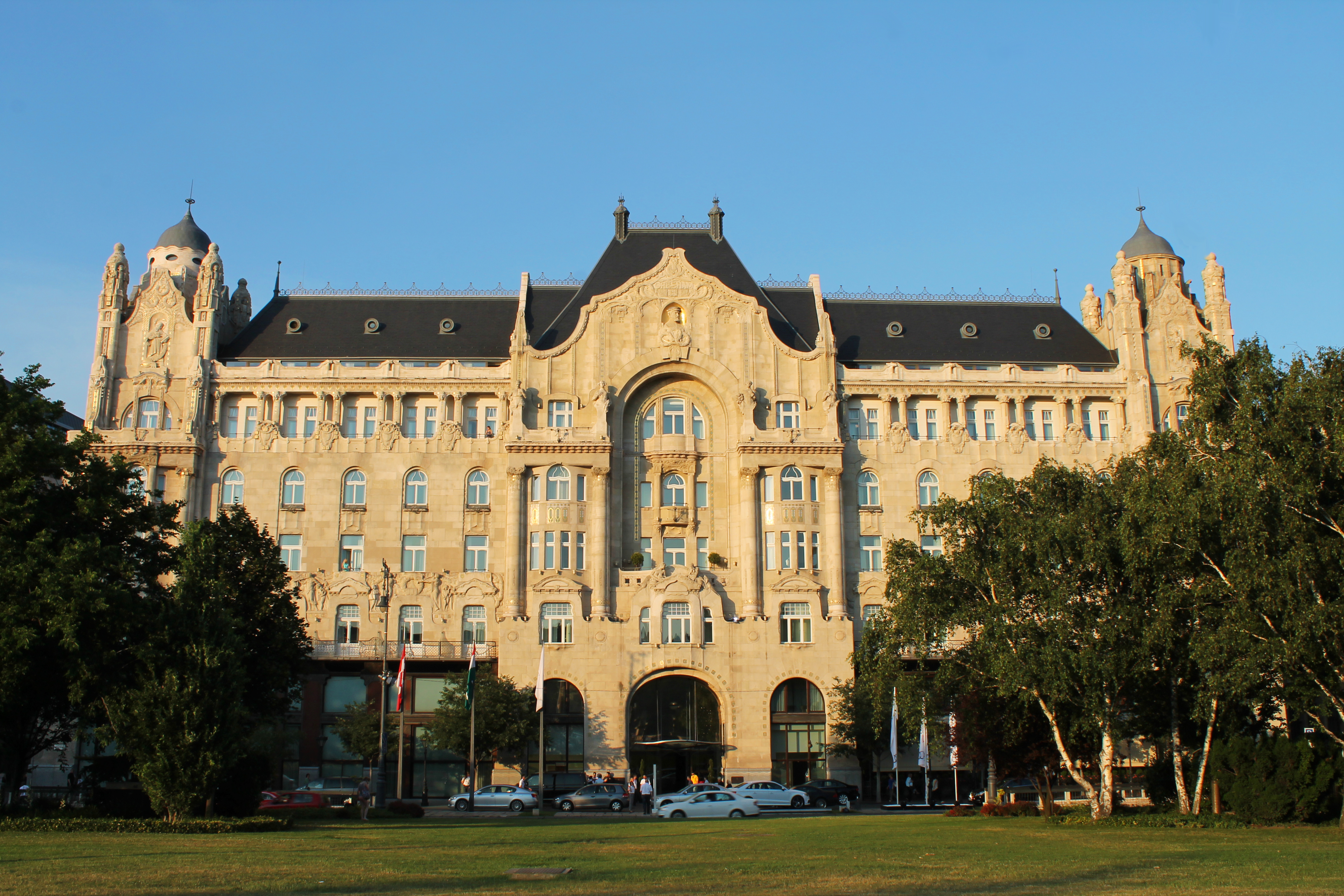
Four Seasons Hotel Budapest Gresham Palace

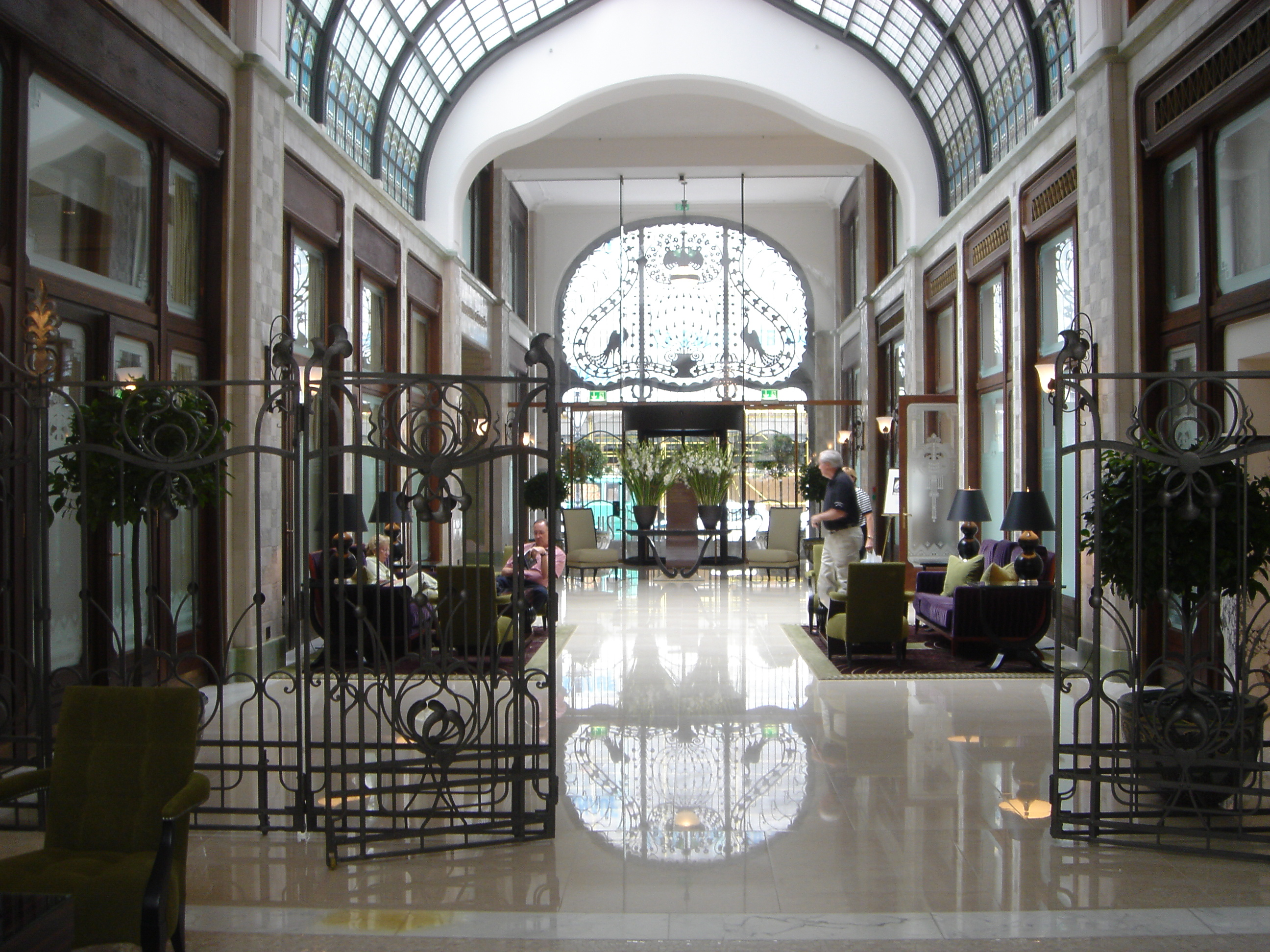
Interior of the Gresham Palace

The Gresham Palace (Gresham-palota) is a building in Budapest, Hungary; it is an example of Art Nouveau architecture. Completed in 1906 as an office and apartment building, it is today the Four Seasons Hotel Budapest Gresham Palace, a luxury hotel managed by Four Seasons Hotels. It is located along the River Danube, adjacent to Széchenyi Square and the eastern terminus of the Széchenyi Chain Bridge.

== History ==
The site was once occupied by Nákó House, a neo-classical palace built in 1827. In 1880, the London-based Gresham Life Assurance Company bought the property, at a time when it was illegal for insurance companies in Great Britain to invest money in stocks, but rental income was an acceptable and legal investment. The company later decided to build its foreign headquarters on the site, and decided that they needed a grander setting for them. They commissioned local architects Zsigmond Quittner and Jozsef Vago to design the new structure, and in 1904, they began construction of the Gresham Palace, which was completed in 1906 and opened in 1907. It was named after the 16th-century English financier Sir Thomas Gresham, the founder of the Royal Exchange in London.

Originally, the palace served as an office building as well as a residence for senior staff of the Gresham company. During the occupation after World War II, the Red Army used the building as a barracks. Eventually, it became decrepit and was used as an apartment building during the People's Republic of Hungary. In 1990, following the end of the communist regime, the national government presented the palace to the city of Budapest.

Oberoi Hotels entered into an agreement to manage a hotel in the building in 1991, but ensuing legal battles with residents of the building caused Oberoi to drop out in 1995. In 1998, Gresco Investments Ltd acquired the building and received approval from the Budapest Heritage Board to reconstruct it as a luxury hotel while retaining its original Art Nouveau architecture. Gresco raised $85 million for renovations and in 1999 Four Seasons agreed to oversee the reconstruction and manage the new property.

In 2001, the building was bought by the Irish investment company Quinlan Private. They extensively rebuilt the structure as a luxury hotel, restoring such original details as a large staircase, stained glass, mosaics, ironwork, and winter gardens. The hotel reopened in June 2004. In November 2011, the hotel was bought by the State General Reserve Fund of Oman, though Four Seasons continues to manage it. It currently has 179 guest rooms, including 17 suites.
