= Zsigmond Quittner =

Hungarian architect (1859–1918)

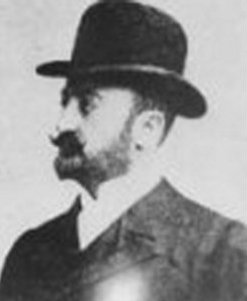
- Zsigmond Quittner
- Born: Sigismund Quittner; 13 February 1859; Pest, Austria-Hungary
- Died: 25 October 1918; Vienna, Austria-Hungary
- Education: TU Munich, Munich
- Occupation: Architect
- Buildings: Gresham Palace

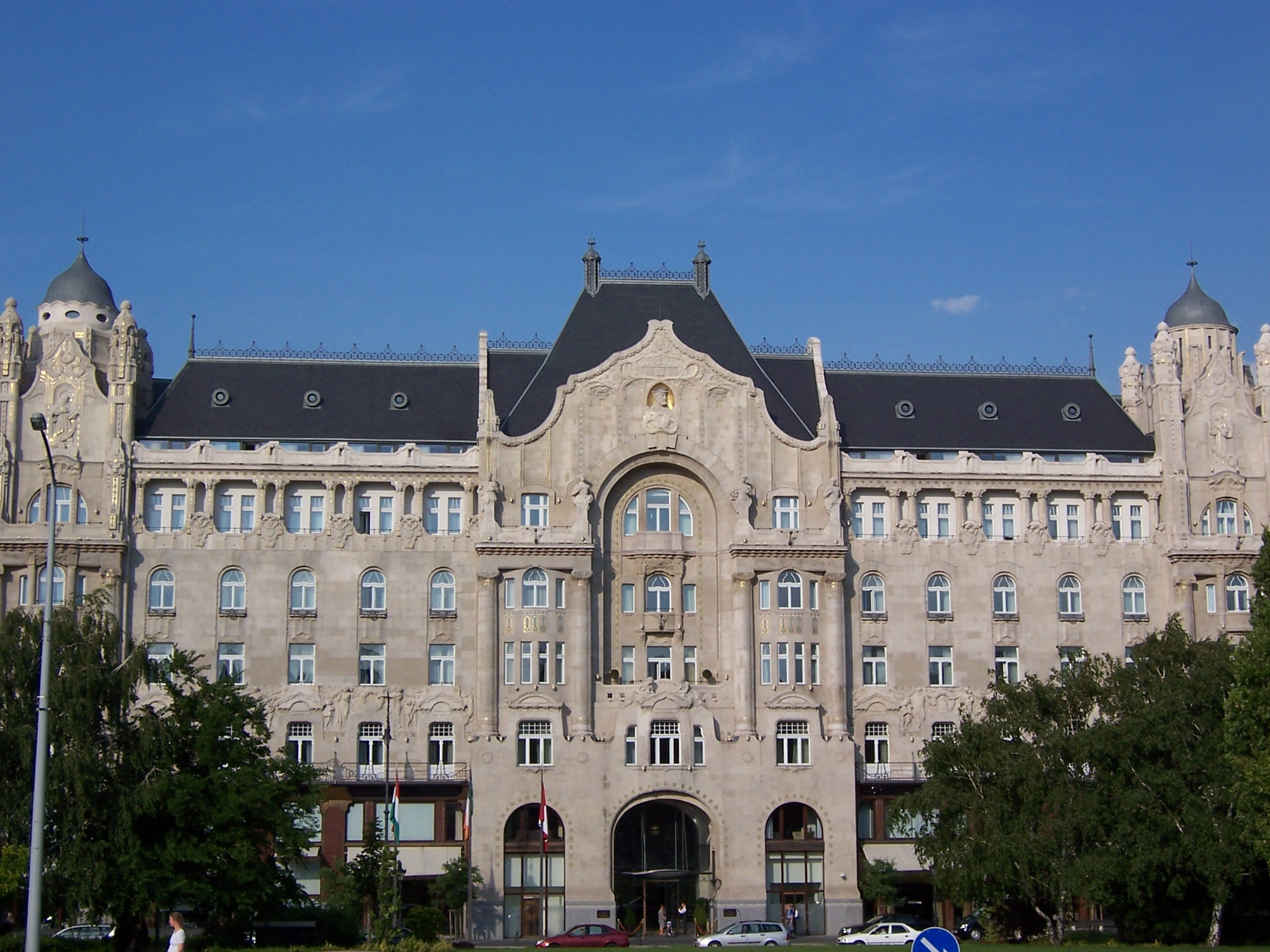
Gresham Palace in Budapest

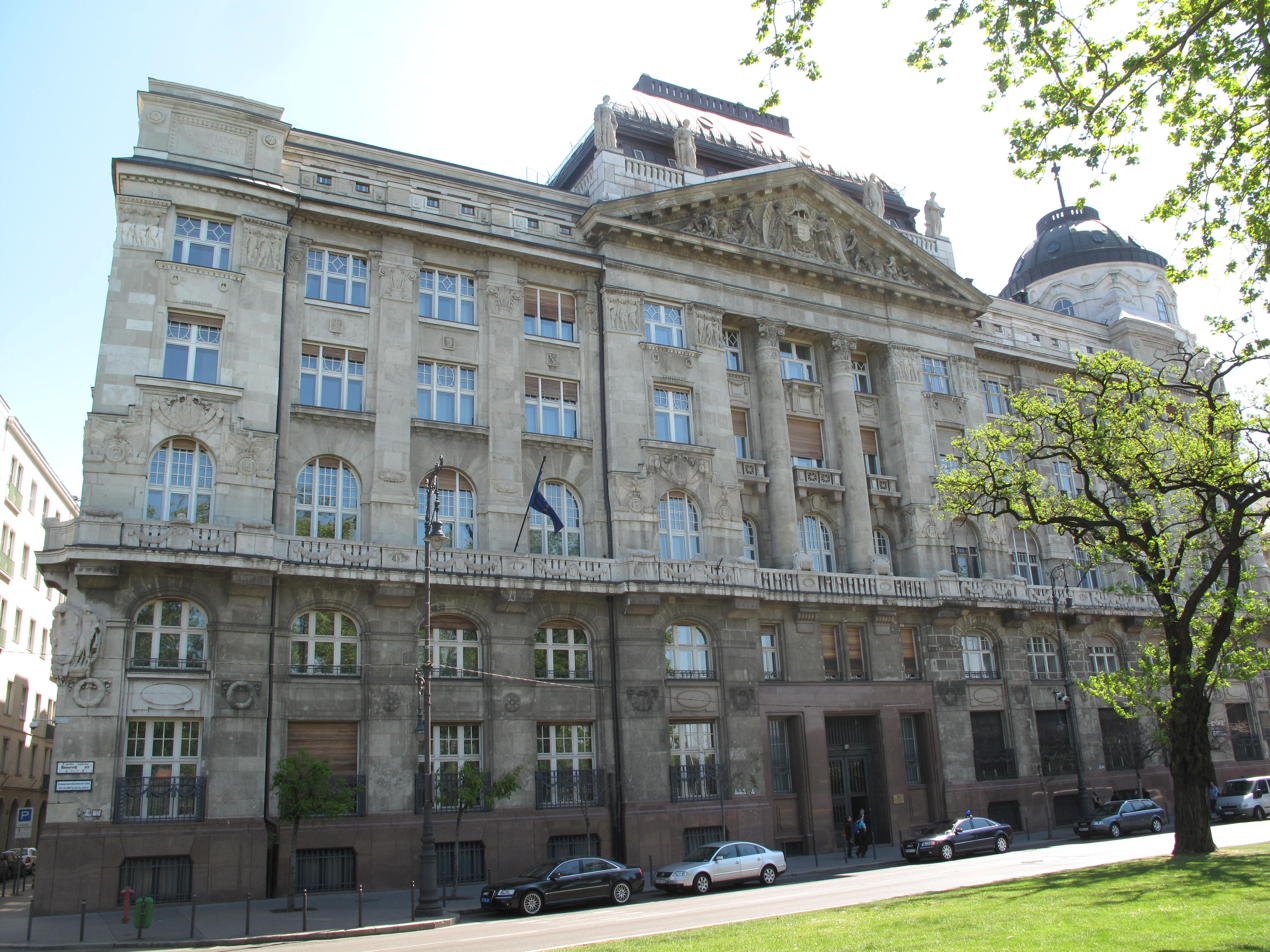
Former Pesti Magyar Kereskedelmi Bank, now interior ministry

Zsigmond Quittner (born as Sigismund Quittner, 13 February 1859 – 25 October 1918) was a Hungarian architect.

== Career ==
Quittner was born in Pest in 1859. He studied for his degree in Munich and worked in Budapest from 1880. His style is eclectic, a commercial version of the Vienna Secession. He also had an important role in public life, taking part in the city chamber of commerce, National Building Council and was president of the Hungarian Institute of Architects. He died in Vienna in 1918.

== Main buildings in Budapest ==
- Former Megyeri Palace, Andrássy út 12.
- Former Phőnix Insurance office, Bécsi út
- Former Fasor Sanatorium, Városligeti fasor 9–11.
- Former Gresham Palace, with József and László Vágó), Széchenyi István tér 5-6 (ex-Roosevelt tér 5–6).
- Former Hungarian Commercial Bank of Pest, now interior ministry, Roosevelt tér 1. (co-designer: Ignác Alpár)
- The Mentők headquarters, Markó út 22.
