= Jean Bornoy =

Jean Bornoy, was an architect of the Countie of Hainaut ( part of it was conquest by Louis XIV) architect active in the 15th century in Brussels, in the surroundings of Philippe le Bon, duke of Burgundy.

== Biography ==
He is probably the first and true designer of the Brussels Town Hall which currently forms its left wing.

His name appears in the book of expenses for the construction of the town hall for the year 1405, which specifies that "Master" Jean Bornoy worked with 17 masons, 4 stonemasons and 27 companions.

His main collaborator was Jacob van Thienen.

As for the tower, it is the work of Jan van Ruysbroeck

== Bibliography ==
- Guillaume Des Marez, L'architecte Jean Van Ruysbroeck et le XVe siècle bruxellois, Brussels, Lamertin, 1923.
