= Belfry of Brussels =

Demolished belfry in Brussels, Belgium

- Beffroi de Bruxelles (French); Belfort van Brussel (Dutch)
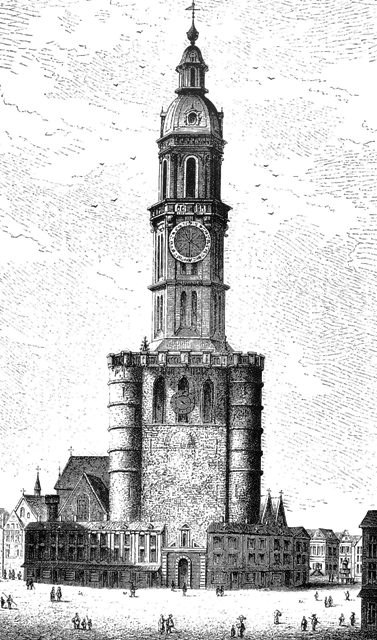
- The Belfry of Brussels
- Interactive map of the Belfry of Brussels area

General information
- Location: Brussels, Belgium
- Coordinates: 50°50′52″N 4°21′06″E
- Destroyed: 25 July 1714

The Belfry of Brussels (French: Beffroi de Bruxelles; Dutch: Belfort van Brussel) was a medieval bell tower in central Brussels, Belgium. Built long before the city's current Town Hall on the Grand-Place/Grote Markt (Brussels' main square), whose tower it should not be confused with, it formerly stood in front of the Church of St. Nicholas until its collapse on 25 July 1714. It was never rebuilt.

== History ==
=== Early history ===
As early as 1381, the belfry was equipped with a carillon with various bells intended to regulate the city's civil life. This carillon was one of the oldest in the world, with perhaps the first known automatic system built around 1551. The most imposing bell, the tocsin, was used to signal wars, revolts, or the execution of those condemned to death. Other bells regulated, among other things, working hours, markets, or the opening and closing of city gates. In 1662, a new automatic carillon was installed by the Dutch founders Hemonys.

Over the centuries, the belfry underwent several modifications and repairs, but it largely retained its original design. It collapsed a first time in 1367 and was immediately rebuilt. During the bombardment of Brussels in 1695, the upper part caught fire and the half-melted bells fell through the various floors. It was restored again following this event by the architect Guilliam or Willem de Bruyn.

=== Collapse and aftermath ===
On 25 July 1714, the belfry collapsed unexpectedly. The event caused widespread devastation in the city, damaging the surrounding buildings and killing four people. While the exact cause of the collapse remains uncertain, it is believed that structural weaknesses, exacerbated by centuries of wear and tear, contributed to the disaster. After the collapse, no immediate effort was made to rebuild the belfry.

Since that date, Brussels has been without a belfry, despite later attempts at reconstruction up until 1888. The Town Hall's tower, built when the belfry had long been fulfilling its role, never took on its mantle, having never been equipped with a tocsin, municipal bells, a carillon or a lookout service, as its structure, designed for purely aesthetic purposes, did not allow for this.

== See also ==
- Belfries of Belgium and France
- History of Brussels
