= Brussels Town Hall =

Historic building and UNESCO World Heritage Site in Brussels, Belgium

- Hôtel de Ville de Bruxelles (French); Stadhuis van Brussel (Dutch)
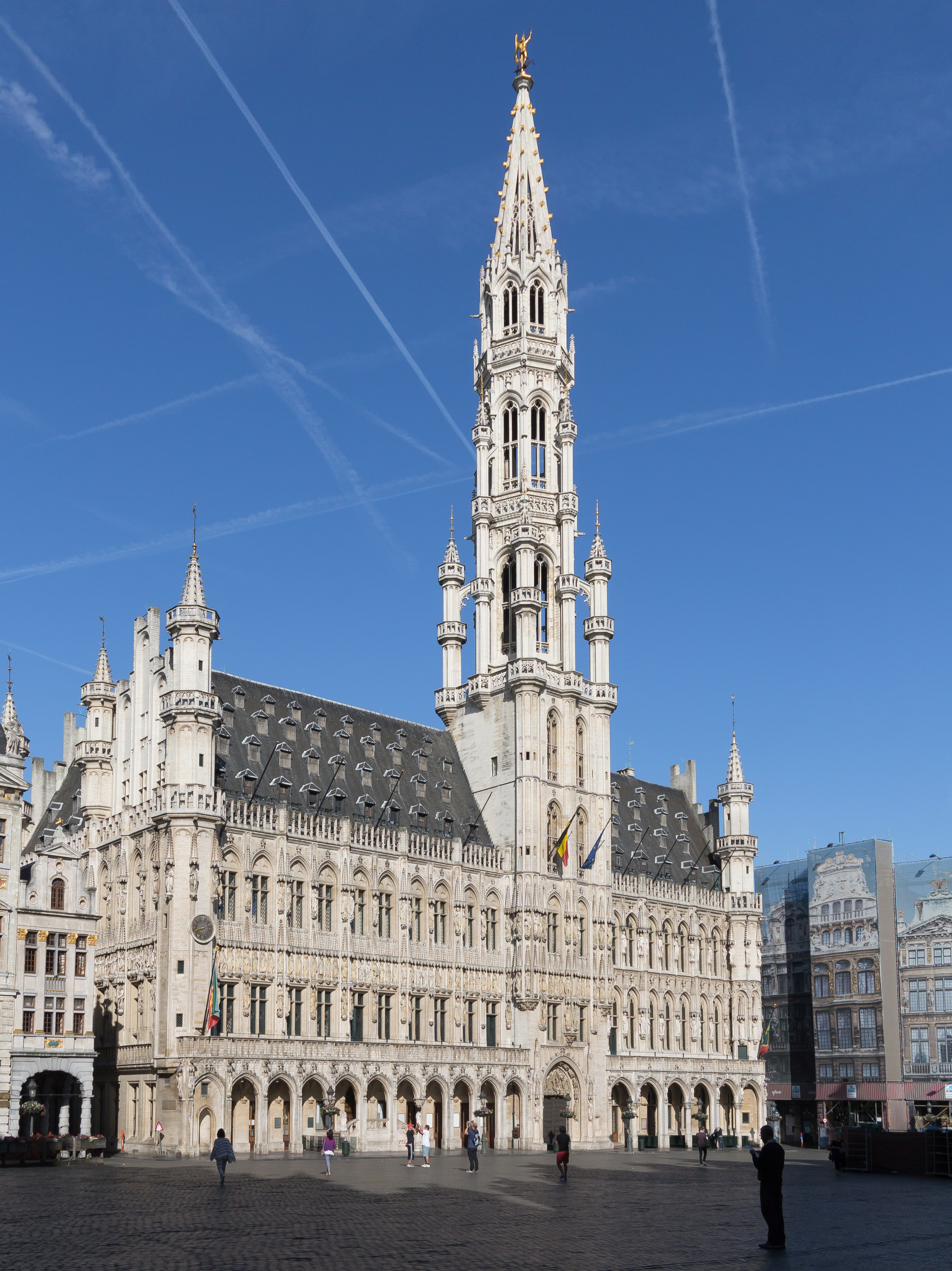
- Town Hall of the City of Brussels's main façade seen from the Grand-Place/Grote Markt

General information
- Type: Town hall
- Architectural style: Gothic; Brabantine Gothic; Classicism
- Location: Grand-Place/Grote Markt, 1000 City of Brussels, Brussels-Capital Region, Belgium
- Coordinates: 50°50′47″N 4°21′6″E
- Construction started: 1401
- Completed: 1455

Height
- Height: 96 metres (315 ft)

Design and construction
- Architects: Jean Bornoy, Jacob van Thienen, Jan van Ruysbroek
- Engineer: Guillaume de Voghel

UNESCO World Heritage Site
- Part of: La Grand-Place, Brussels
- Criteria: Cultural: ii, iv
- Reference: 857
- Inscription: 1998 (22nd Session)

The Town Hall (French: Hôtel de Ville, pronounced [otɛl də vil]; Dutch: Stadhuis, pronounced [stɑtˈɦœys]) of the City of Brussels is a landmark building and the former seat of that municipality of Brussels, Belgium. It is located on the south side of the Grand-Place/Grote Markt (Brussels' main square), opposite the King's House or Bread House (Note: French: Maison du Roi; Dutch: Broodhuis) building, housing the Brussels City Museum.

Erected in stages between 1401 and 1455, the Town Hall is the only surviving medieval building on the Grand-Place and forms the square's architectural centrepiece. With its richly ornamented façade and 96-metre-high (315 ft) tower, it is considered a masterpiece of civil Gothic architecture, and more specifically, of Brabantine Gothic. Its three classicist rear wings date from the 18th century.

Following the relocation of the mayor, aldermen and municipal administration to the Brucity building in 2023, the Town Hall has primarily served a ceremonial and tourist function. Since 1998, it has also been listed as a UNESCO World Heritage Site, as part of the square.

== History ==
=== Gothic Town Hall ===
The Town Hall (French: Hôtel de Ville, Dutch: Stadhuis) of the City of Brussels was erected in stages, between 1401 and 1455, on the south side of the Grand-Place/Grote Markt, transforming the square into the seat of municipal power. Due to the square's tumultuous history (see details below), it is also its only surviving medieval building.

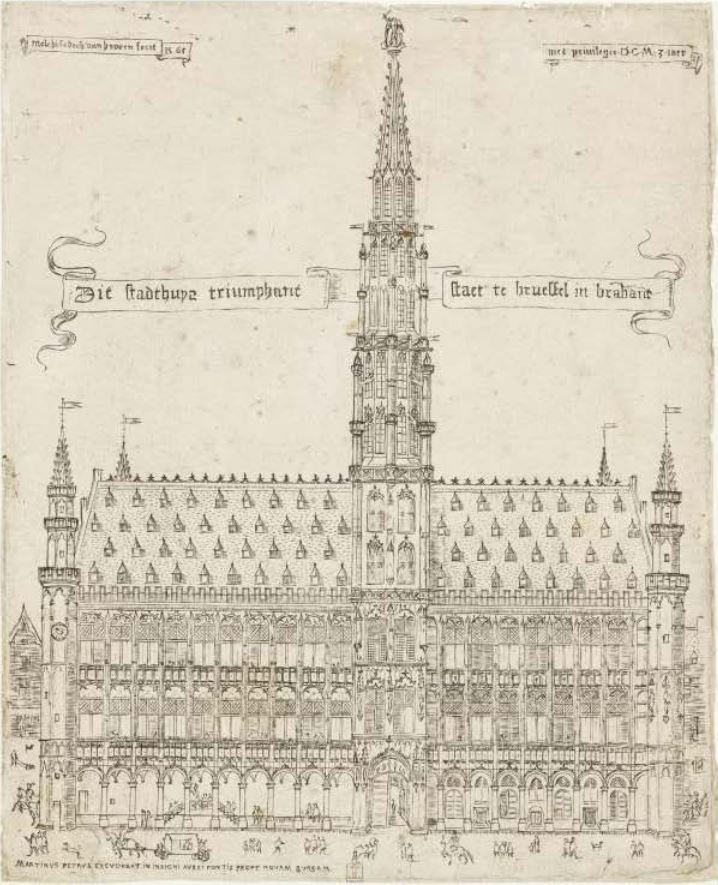
Brussels' Town Hall, engraving by Melchisedech van Hoorn, 1565

The oldest part of the present building is its east wing (to the left when facing the front). This wing, together with a shorter tower, was built between 1401 and 1421. The architect and designer is probably Jacob van Thienen with whom Jean Bornoy collaborated. Initially, future expansion of the building was not foreseen; however, the admission of the craft guilds into the traditionally patrician city government apparently spurred interest in providing more room for the building. As a result, a second, somewhat longer wing was built onto the existing structure, with the young Duke Charles the Bold laying its first stone in 1444. The architect of this west wing is unknown. Historians think that it could be Guillaume (Willem) de Voghel, who was the architect of the City of Brussels in 1452, and who was also, at that time, the designer of the Aula Magna at the Palace of Coudenberg.

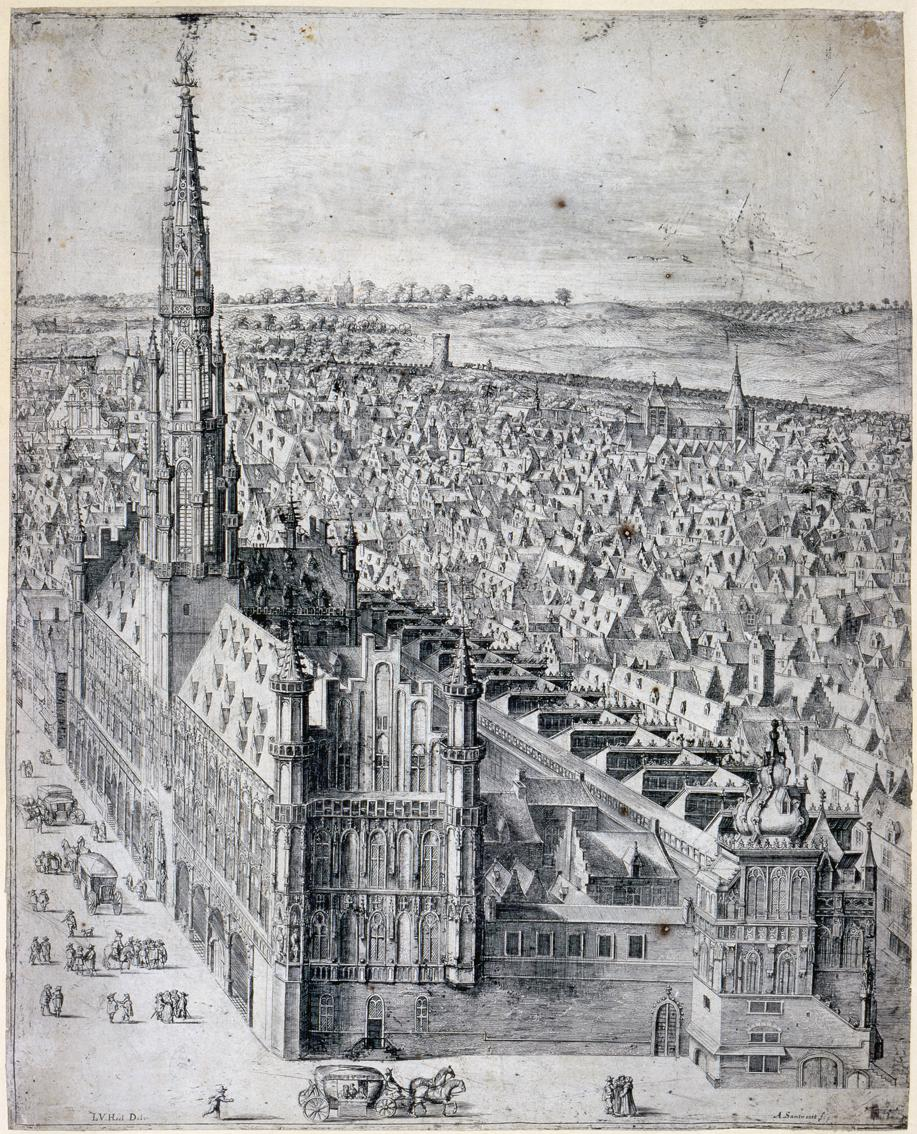
Brussels' Town Hall, engraving by Abraham van Santvoort after Leo van Heil, c. 1650

The 96-metre-high (315 ft) tower in Brabantine Gothic style is the work of Jan van Ruysbroek, the court architect of Philip the Good. By 1455, this tower, replacing the older one, was complete. Above the Town Hall's roof, the square tower narrows to a lavishly pinnacled octagonal openwork. At its summit stands a 2.7-metre-tall (9 ft) (Note: This is the height of Saint Michael alone. Including the base to the point of the sword, the statue is about 5 metres (16 ft) tall.) gilt metal statue of Saint Michael, the patron saint of the City of Brussels, slaying a dragon or demon. The tower, its front archway, and the main building's façade are conspicuously off-centre relative to one another. According to a legend, the architect of the building, upon discovering this "error", leapt to his death from the tower. More likely, the asymmetry of the Town Hall was an accepted consequence of the scattered construction history and space constraints.

=== Destruction and rebuilding ===
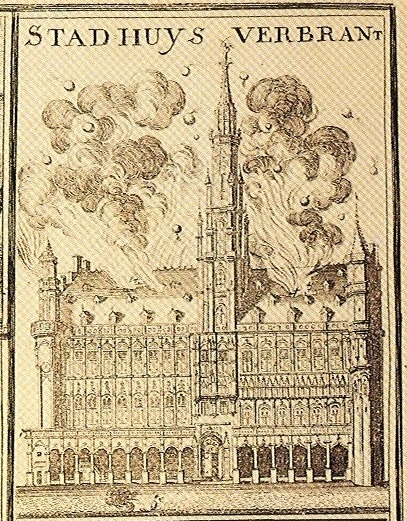
The Town Hall burning during the bombardment of Brussels in 1695

On 13 August 1695, during the Nine Years' War, a 70,000-strong French army under Marshal François de Neufville, duc de Villeroy, began a bombardment of Brussels in an effort to draw the League of Augsburg's forces away from their siege on French-held Namur in what is now Wallonia. The French launched a massive bombardment of the mostly defenceless city centre with cannons and mortars, setting it on fire and flattening the majority of the Grand-Place and the surrounding city. The resulting fire completely gutted the Town Hall, destroying the building's archives and art collections, including paintings by Rogier van der Weyden. Only the stone shell of the building remained standing. That it survived at all is ironic, as it was the principal target of the artillery fire.

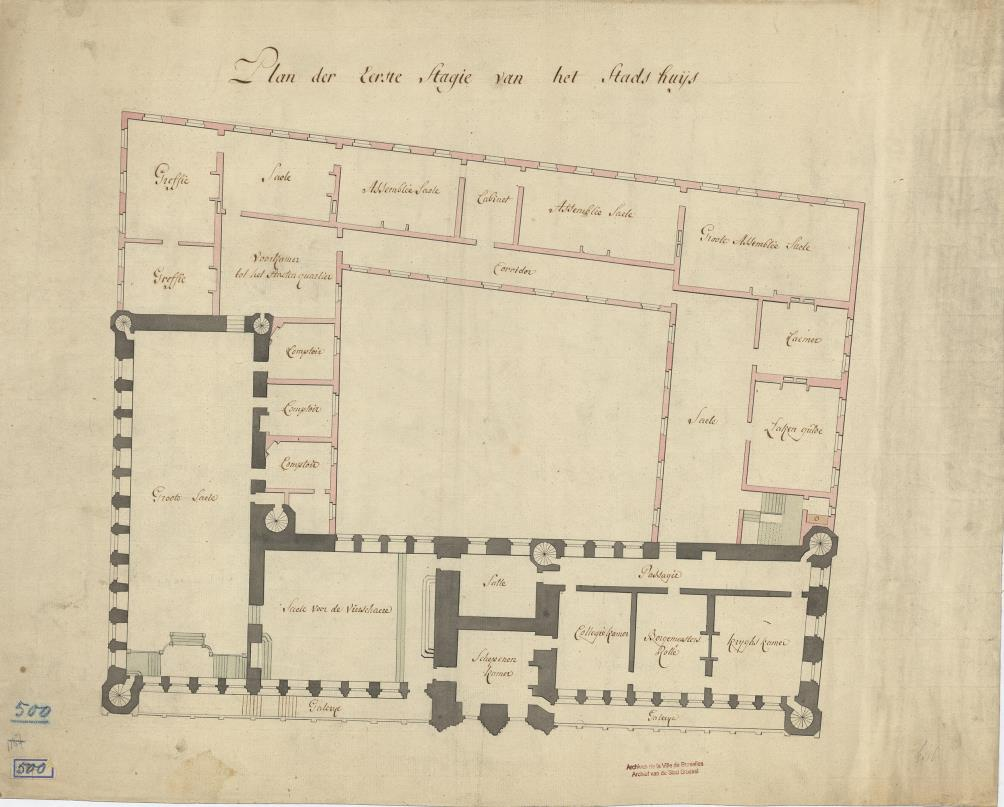
Plan of the first floor, c. 1760: the Gothic L-shape (grey) and the classicist extension (pink)

After the bombardment, the municipal government funded the Town Hall's repairs by selling houses and land. The interior was soon rebuilt and enlarged by the architect-sculptor Cornelis van Nerven, from 1706 to 1717. Van Nerven added three rear wings in the Louis XIV style over the ruins of the former inner cloth market (Halle au Drap) along the Rue de l'Amigo/Vruntstraat, transforming the L-shaped building into its present configuration: a quadrilateral with an inner courtyard.

The Town Hall not only housed the city's magistrate, but also, until 1795, the States of Brabant, the representation of the three estates (nobility, clergy and commoners) to the court of the Duke of Brabant. In 1830, the Provisional Government operated from there during the Belgian Revolution, which led to the separation of the Southern Netherlands from the Northern Netherlands, resulting in the formation of Belgium as it is known today.

=== 19th-century restorations ===
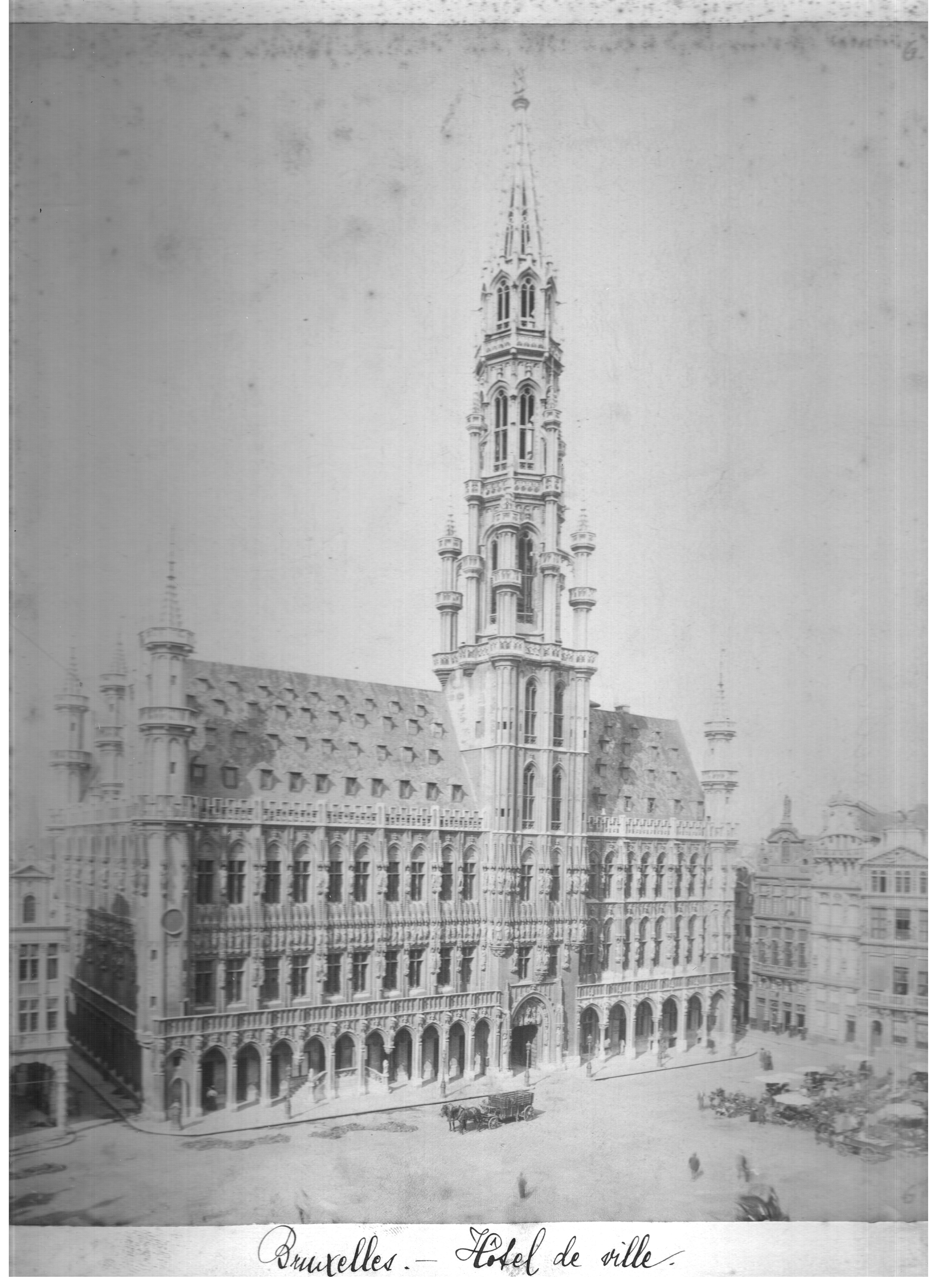
The Town Hall, c. 1880

The Town Hall underwent several restoration campaigns throughout the 19th century, beginning in 1840 under the direction of the architect Tilman-François Suys. The interior was later revised by the architect Victor Jamaer from 1860, in the style of his mentor Eugène Viollet-le-Duc. Jamaer was the City of Brussels' architect and also reconstructed the King's House. The interior became dominated by the neo-Gothic: the Maximilian Room and its antechamber with tapestries depicting the life of Clovis, the ornate States of Brabant Room (Municipal Council Room), the likewise richly furnished Gothic Room and the Wedding Room (formerly the courtroom).

Most of the Town Hall's statues were also made at this time. Before then, the building was not adorned with the countless statues it is today, except for corbels, representations of eight prophets above the portal, and a few statues located at the corner turrets. Jamaer reworked the façade by adding non-existent niches, as well as a gallery and a new portal. Between 1844 and 1902, nearly three hundred statues in Caen and Échaillon stone, created by famous artists, including Charles Geefs, Charles-Auguste Fraikin, Eugène Simonis and George Minne, were executed. The interior rooms were replenished with tapestries, paintings, and sculptures, largely representing subjects of importance in local and regional history, such as a monumental bronze statue of Saint Michael created by Charles van der Stappen in the entrance.

=== Contemporary history ===
At the start of World War I, as refugees flooded Brussels, the Town Hall served as a makeshift hospital. On 20 August 1914, the occupying German army arrived at the Grand-Place and hoisted a German flag at the left side of the Town Hall.

During World War II, the Town Hall was again affected by the German occupation. On 18 May 1940, the day after Brussels' surrender, Mayor Joseph Van De Meulebroeck received the German commander in the building's inner courtyard. It was also from the building that the proclamation announcing his removal from office by the occupation authorities was issued on 30 June 1941. Following the war, the building resumed its role as a venue for official receptions; among those received there was Field Marshal Bernard Montgomery on 18 September 1947.

The Town Hall was designated a historic monument on 9 March 1936, at the same time as the King's House. It has been a UNESCO World Heritage Site since 1998, as part of the Grand-Place's registration. Conservation work has continued into the 21st century. In May 2026, restoration began on the building's two historic external portals: the one on the Grand-Place, dating from the 15th century, and the one on the Rue de l'Amigo, dating from 1717.

The Town Hall remained the City of Brussels' political and administrative seat until 2023, when the mayor, aldermen and municipal administration largely moved to the Brucity building, the City's new administrative centre, built on the site of the former Parking 58. Nowadays, the building retains ceremonial and representative functions, including official receptions and weddings, while its historic rooms are still used for cultural events and visits.

== Architecture ==
=== Tower ===
Frontal view of the main façade and tower from across the square

The tower, which projects slightly from the façade and reaches a height of approximately 96 metres (315 ft), is made up of two very different parts that nevertheless form a harmonious ensemble: a square base dating from the first phase of construction and a lantern tower built by Jan van Ruysbroek nearly half a century later above the older masonry structure. Concealed wrought-iron reinforcements, integrated into the masonry, contribute to the structural stability of the remarkably slender construction.

The square base is pierced by an ogival portal surmounted by decorative elements similar to those on the left wing: mullioned windows on the first floor, a row of statues, then further mullioned windows beneath trefoil tympana on the second floor. This square tower continues upwards with two additional floors, each pierced by a pair of ogival bays on the side facing the Grand-Place. The upper part of the base shaft terminates in a gallery above the roofline, with projecting pinnacles rising above its corners and the middle of each side.

Closeup view of Van Ruysbroek's lantern tower

The upper part of the tower and spire

Above it rises the finely openwork octagonal lantern tower, consisting of three superimposed levels with galleries, openwork ogival bays, stone parapets and richly decorated pillars. Eight pinnacle towers accompany this structure: four larger, buttressed turrets—also octagonal—at the corners, and four more slender pinnacles rising above its sides. The turrets are connected to the central structure by flying buttresses.

The tower culminates in a slender, openwork pyramidal spire, whose eight stone ribs are connected by elaborate tracery panels. Its decoration includes crockets, pinnacles and gargoyles, as well as gilded elements. It is surmounted by the statue of Saint Michael, the patron saint of the City of Brussels, slaying a dragon or demon.

=== Statue of Saint Michael ===
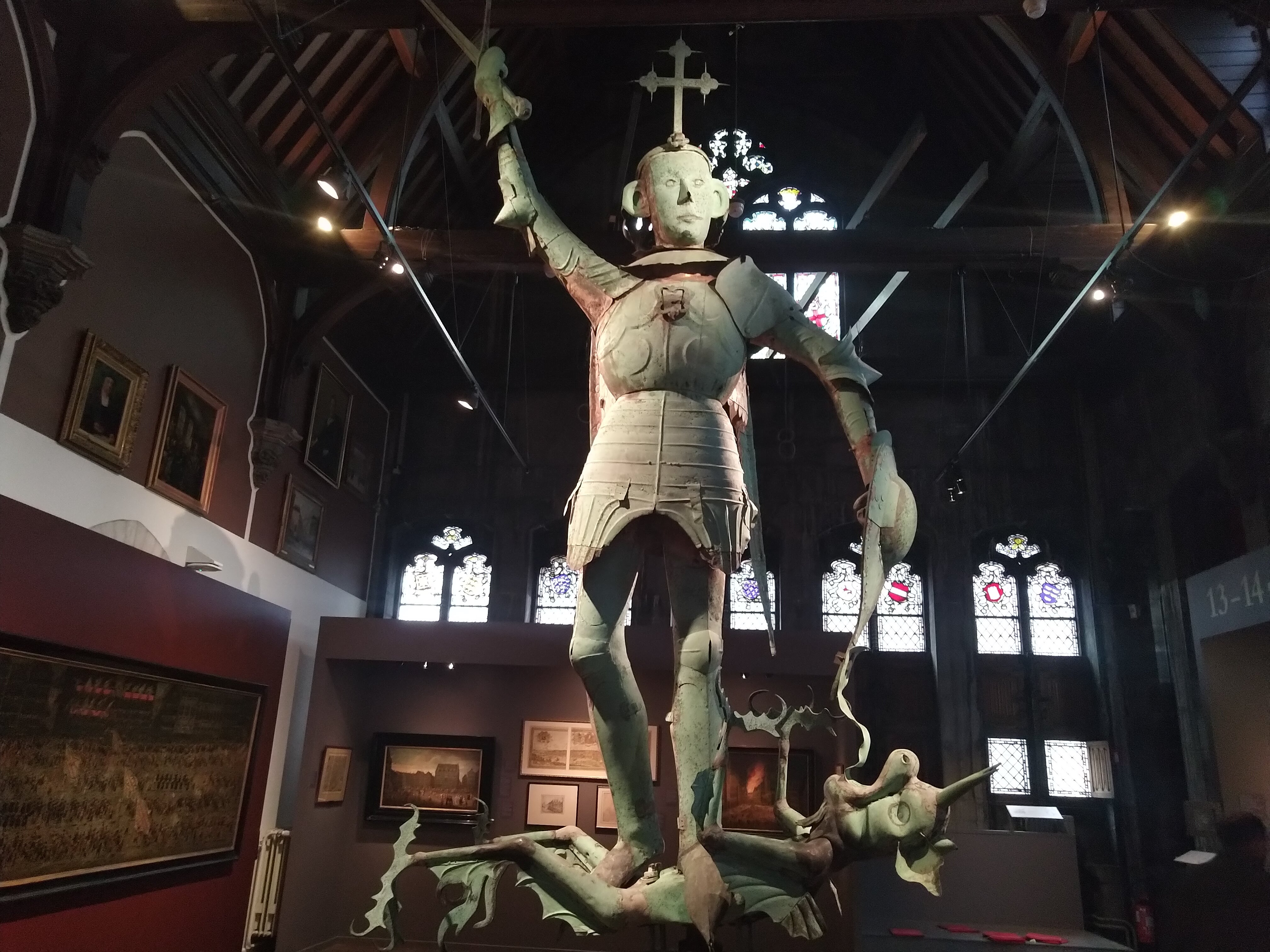
The original statue of Saint Michael kept in the Brussels City Museum

The statue of Saint Michael is attributed to Maarten (Martin) Van Rode and was installed on the tower on 24 July 1455. It depicts the archangel, which symbolises the city, wielding a sword in his raised hand while standing victoriously over a defeated dragon or demon. The imagery is associated with the Book of Revelation (12:7–9), which describes the battle in heaven between Michael and his angels and the dragon, identified as the Devil or Satan.

This sculpture measures approximately 5.7 metres (19 ft) in height, from its base to the tip of the sword, and weighs around 400 kg (880 lb). Originally gilded with gold leaf, it is made of hammered copper plates attached to an internal metal framework, with certain solid elements, including the hands, the cross and the demon's claws, made of cast brass. Designed to rotate with the wind, it functions as a weather vane, with Saint Michael turning to face the prevailing wind. Up close, it looks clumsy and ill-proportioned, but these distortions disappear when viewed from afar, from which it appears elegantly proportioned.

The sculpture underwent several restorations over the centuries. In the 19th century, it was temporarily lowered from the tower for restoration. Its sword was damaged by lightning in 1863 and subsequently replaced. In 1896, the original iron structural components were replaced with bronze ones, which are less conductive. In 1993, the deteriorated sculpture was removed from the tower and replaced by a copy, which was installed in 1996. The original is kept in the Brussels City Museum, located in the King's House or Bread House building across the Grand-Place. It was put on public display in 2018.

=== Main façade ===
The main façade, facing the Grand-Place, consists of two asymmetrical wings framing the tower and is terminated by corner turrets. The longer eastern wing and the shorter western wing are articulated by a series of arcades at ground level, a balcony connecting the two wings, and two upper storeys pierced by large Gothic mullioned windows. The elevation is surmounted by a crenellated openwork balustrade and a steeply pitched saddleback roof pierced by four rows of hipped dormers. The façade's vertical articulation is reinforced by projecting buttress-like piers and the repeated arrangement of windows, niches and sculptural decoration. Gargoyles depicting human beings, animals, or fantastic creatures, project from the turrets and the other parts of the building, serving both a decorative and a functional purpose by discharging rainwater away from the masonry.

The façade is particularly notable for its extensive sculptural decoration, comprising more than 300 statues representing historical, religious and allegorical figures. The programme includes members of the local nobility (such as the Dukes and Duchesses of Brabant and knights of the Noble Houses of Brussels), historical rulers and other prominent figures associated with the history of Brussels, as well as saints, and personifications of virtues. The present sculptures are mainly 19th- and 20th-century reproductions or creations; the original 15th-century ones are also in the Brussels City Museum. These statues are arranged in niches between the windows and along the different architectural levels, creating a continuous sculptural gallery across the façade. Each figure rests on a historiated corbel and is sheltered beneath a finely chiselled stone canopy, surmounted by a pyramid-shaped pinnacle decorated with foliage pattern and topped with a finial.

The four octagonal corner turrets have several levels and are supported on projecting corbels. Their diminishing upper stages are decorated with trefoil arches and terminate in openwork parapets forming narrow walkways. Each level ends with eight gargoyles arranged radially. The turrets are crowned by stone spires decorated with carved foliage and surmounted by weather vanes.

Overview of the main façade

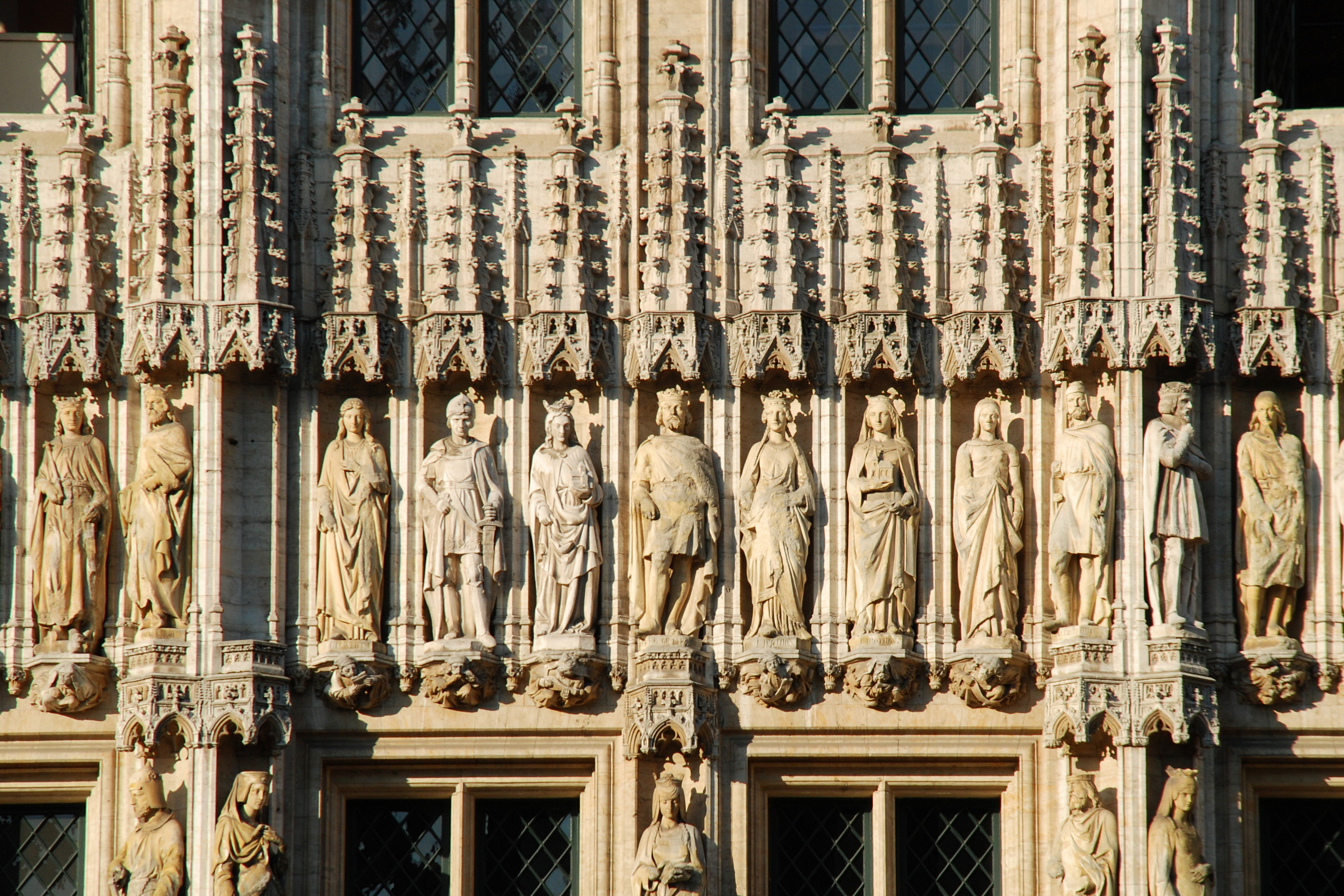
Statues of Dukes and Duchesses of Brabant

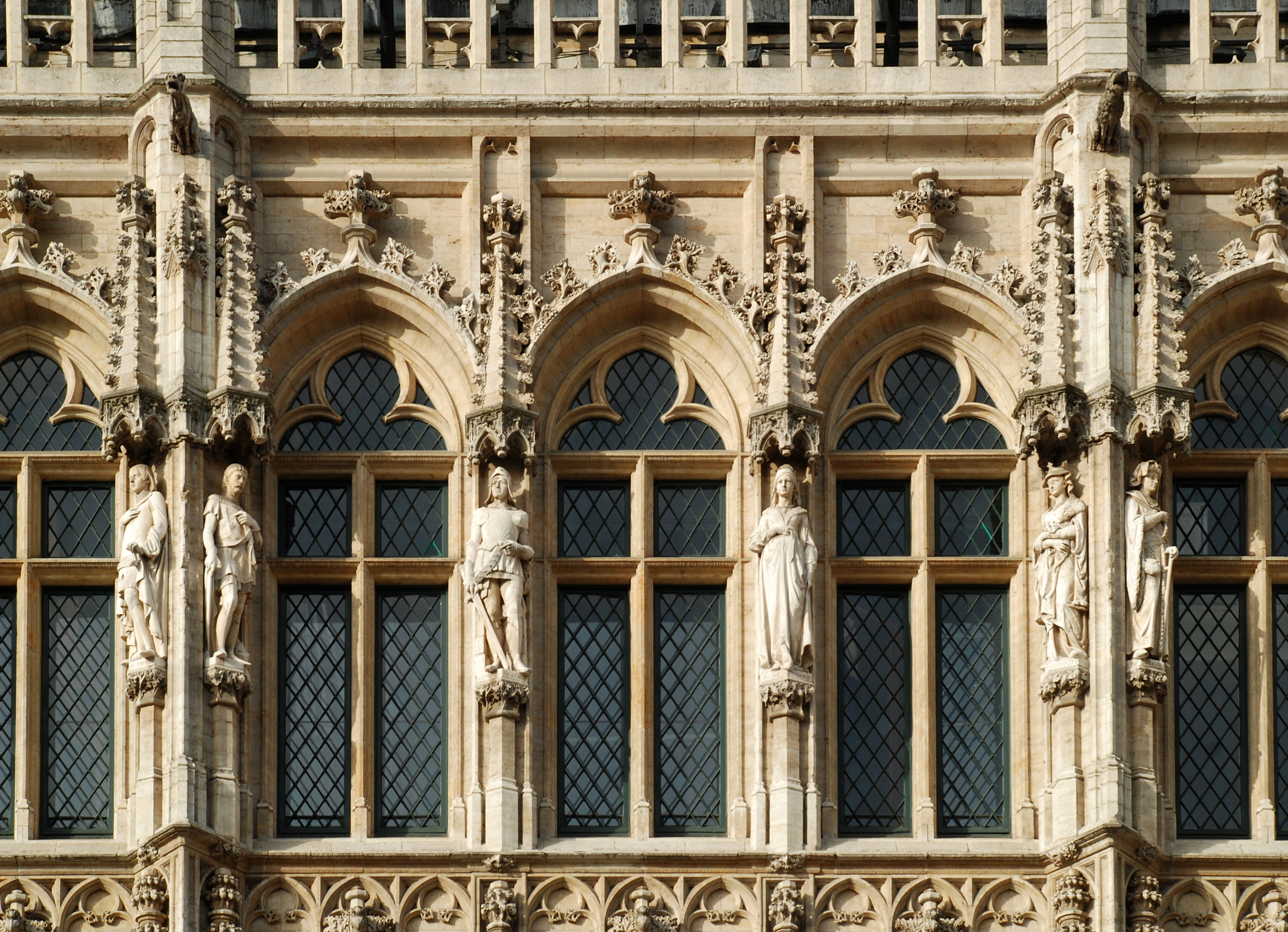
The windows on the second floor of the right wing

=== Portal ===
The base of the tower is pierced by an ogival portal surmounted by a sculpted tympanum depicting Saint Michael surrounded by Saint Sebastian, Saint Christopher, Saint George and Saint Géry (Gaugericus), who, according to legend, erected a chapel that would be at the origin of the City of Brussels.

On either side of the portal stand female statues representing virtues: Prudentia ("Prudence"), Justitia ("Justice") and Pax ("Peace") on the left, Fortitudo ("Fortitude"), Temperantia ("Temperance") and Ius ("Law") on the right. These statues rest on historiated corbels depicting expressive scenes, including a woman confessing to a priest while a devil whispers in her ear.

The five statues in the tympanum and the allegorical statues flanking the doorway date from the 19th-century restorations, whereas the historiated corbels are original Gothic sculptures dating from around 1400. The eight seated figures, generally identified as prophets, decorating the arch of the portal also date from around 1400.

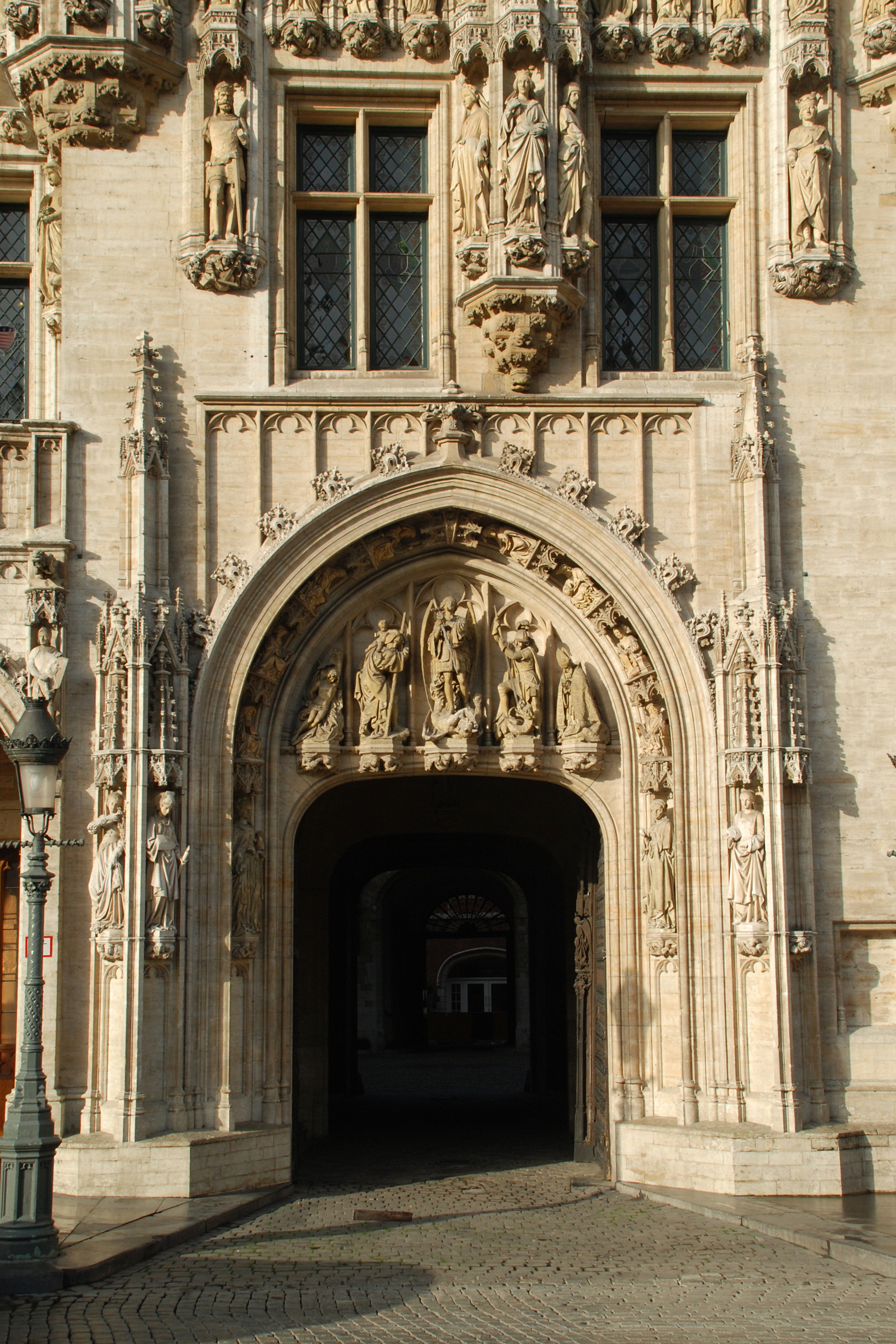
The portal

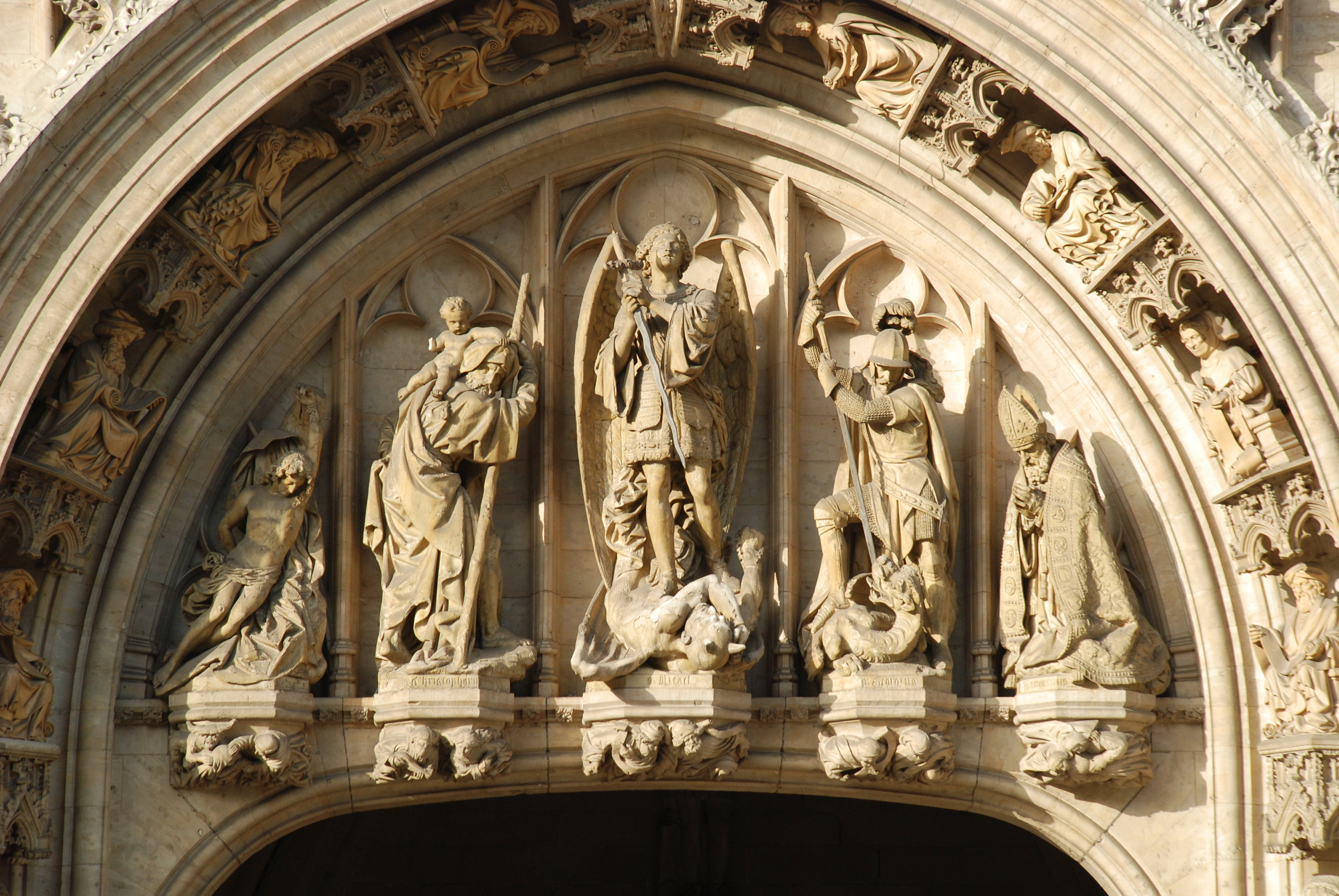
The tympanum of the portal

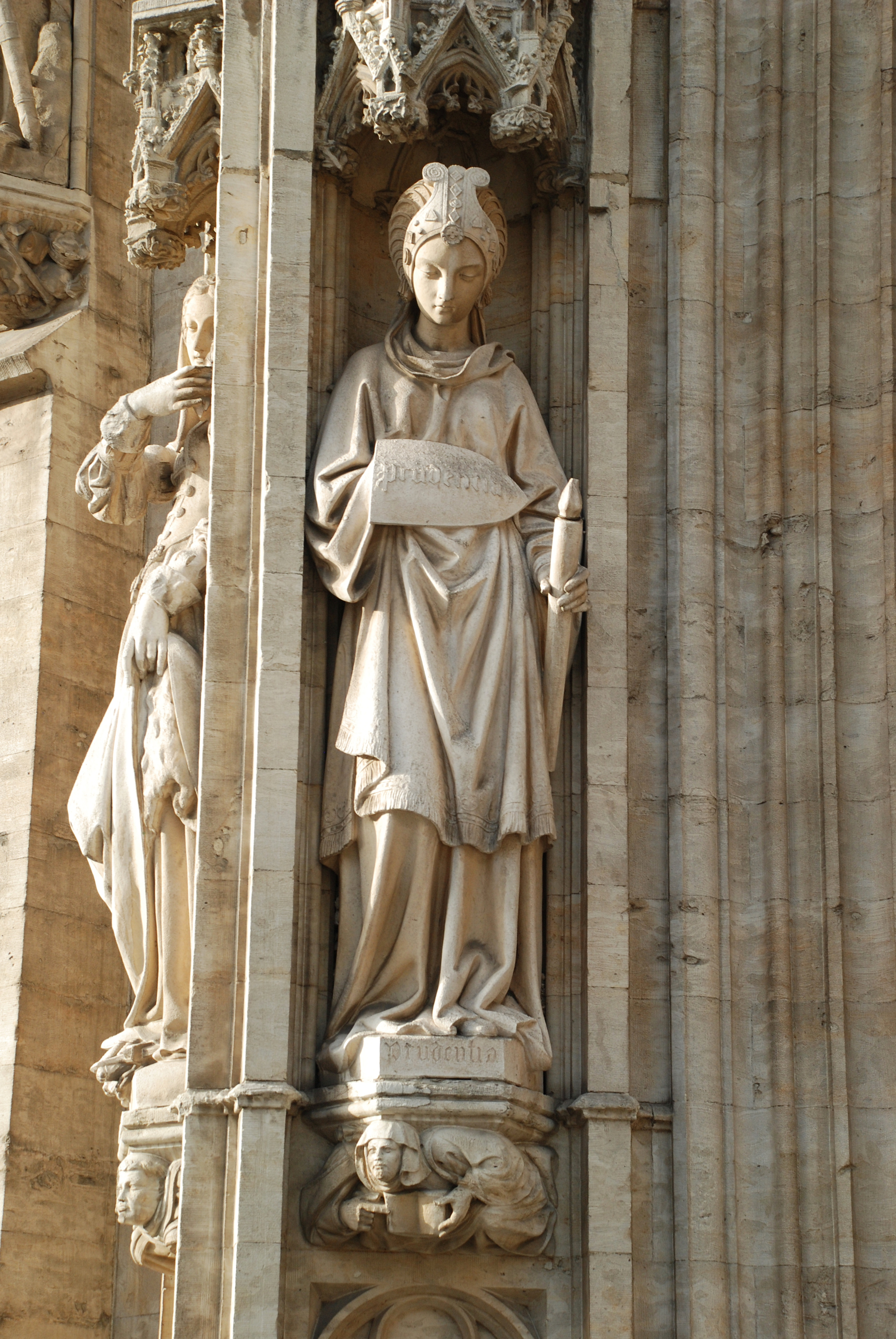
Prudentia ("Prudence")

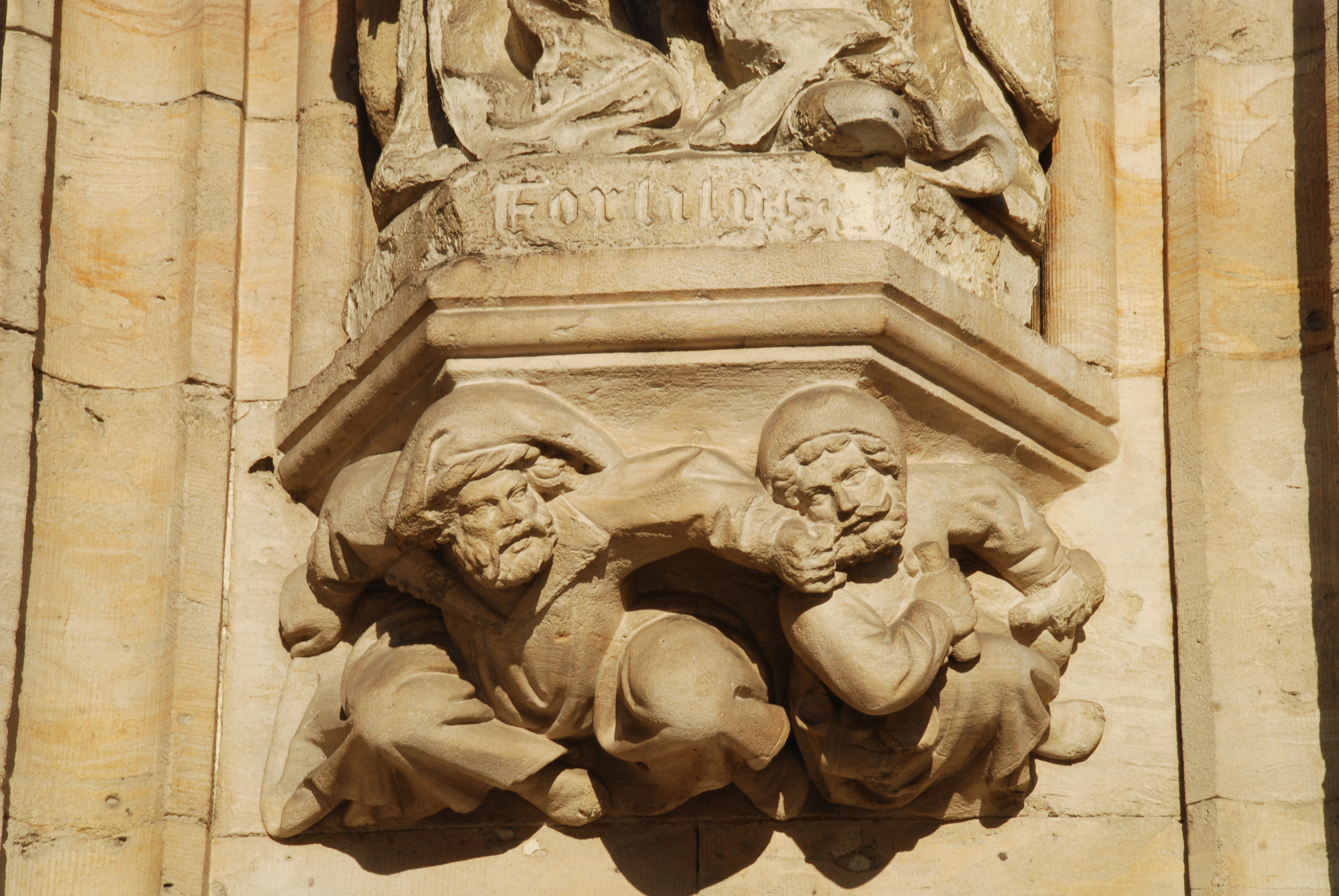
Historiated corbel

=== Arcades ===
The base of the façade is adorned with a gallery of arcades. These arcades are highly asymmetrical, as mentioned above: the left wing has eleven arches (including a blind arch located under the corner turret), while the right wing has only six. These ogival arcades have an outer curve decorated with cabbage leaves, a typical motif of the Brabantine Gothic style. Each of them is topped with a finial, also adorned with cabbage leaves, and is surmounted by an arcade of trefoil arches.

The arches are supported by pillars adorned with statues of knights and squires of the Noble Houses of Brussels. These statues also rest on often highly expressive historiated corbels, among which are representations of a vielle player and a gittern player.

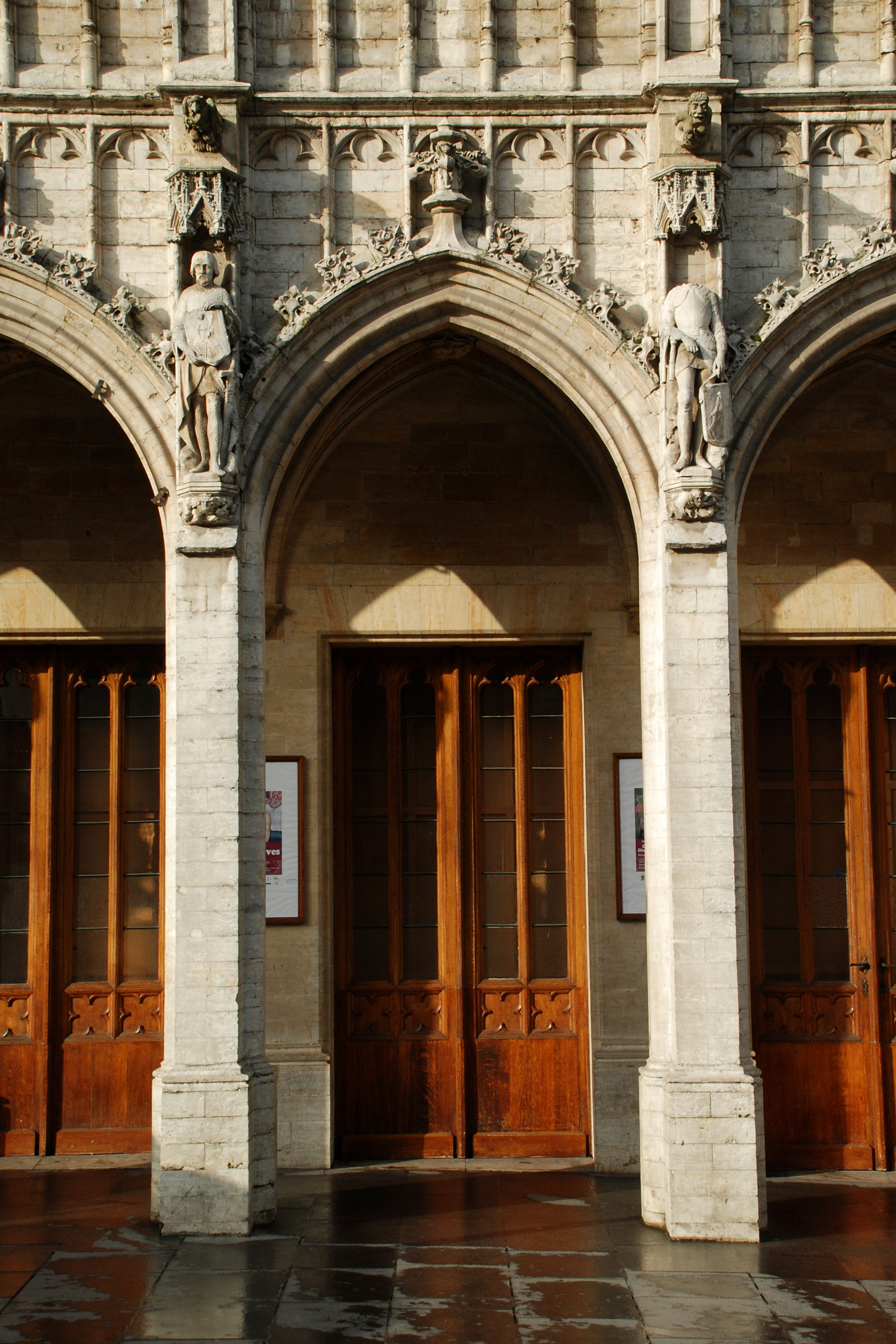
Left wing arcade

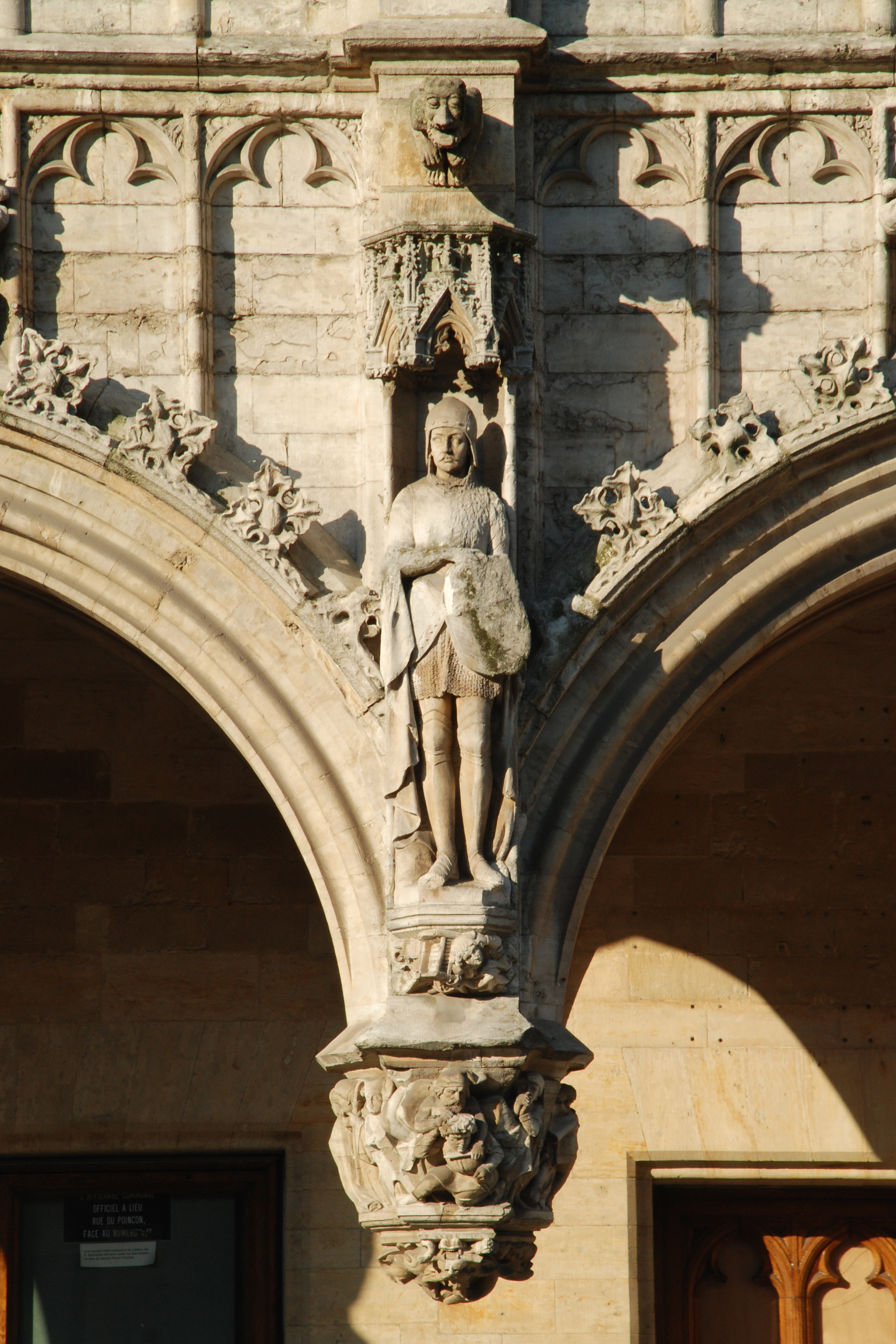
Knight of the Noble Houses of Brussels

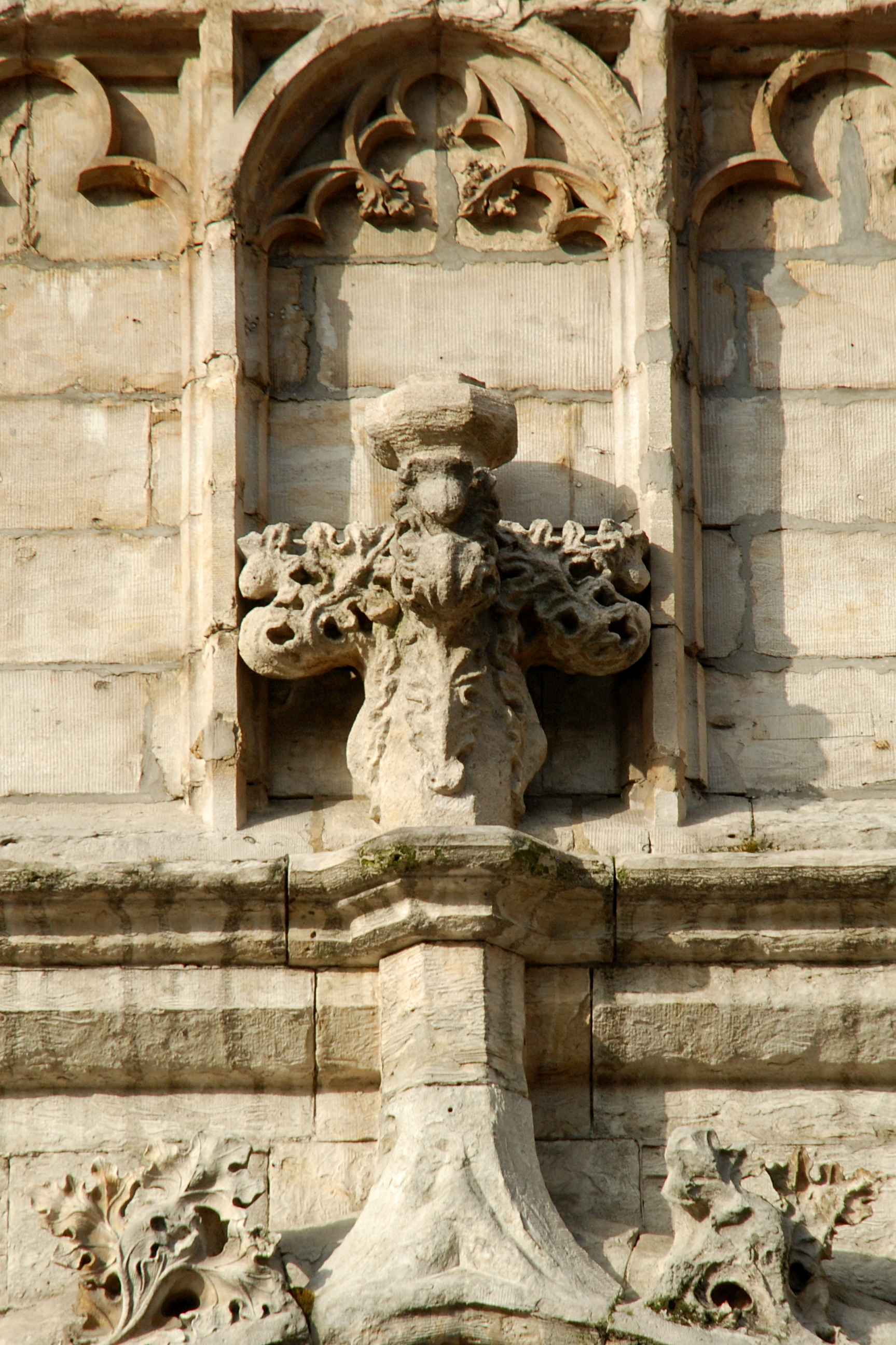
Fleuron, cabbage leaves and arcature of trefoil arches

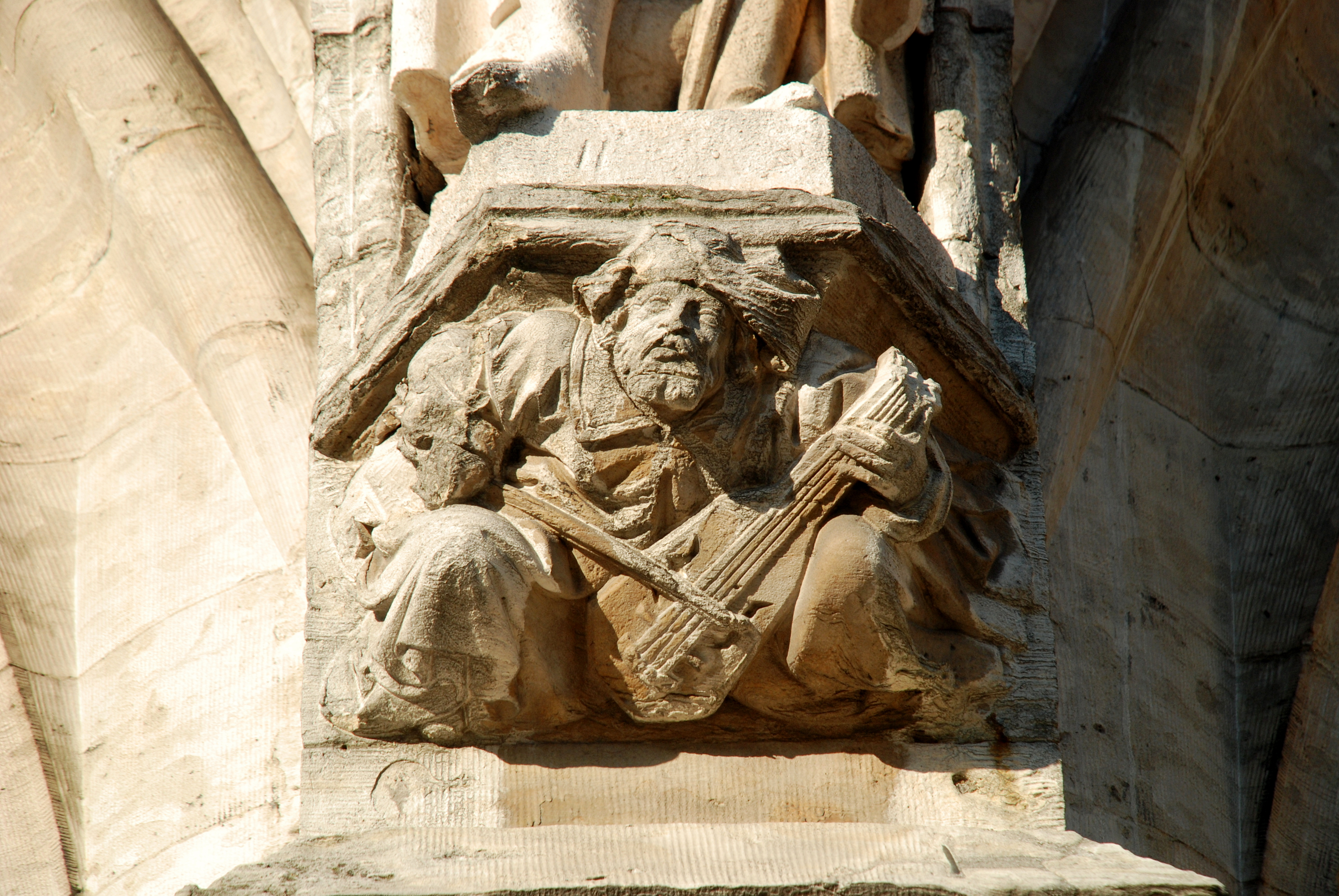
Vielle player

=== Porch ===
The gallery in the left wing houses a porch with a double-flight staircase, a stone balustrade pierced with quatrefoil motifs, and two columns, each surmounted by a seated heraldic lion bearing the coat of arms of Brussels. These lions were sculpted by Guillaume De Groot in 1869, during the 19th-century restorations. The staircase itself dates from 1769–1770.

On either side of the steps, the supports of the arcade are replaced by hanging historiated corbels representing two tragic scenes involving schepen (aldermen) of the City of Brussels:

- On the left, the legend of Herkenbald or Archambault, the Brussels version of the honest judge celebrated for his impartiality. According to the story, while on his deathbed, Herkenbald sentenced his nephew to death for rape. When the officer responsible for carrying out the execution exempted the young man from the sentence, Herkenbald executed him with his own hands, placing justice above family ties. The story is traditionally regarded as apocryphal.
- On the right, the attack on Everard 't Serclaes by the henchmen of the Lord of Gaasbeek. 't Serclaes, a Brussels alderman and defender of the city's liberties, was attacked and mutilated by his assailants. He was transported to the L'Étoile (Dutch: De Sterre) guildhall, located to the left of the Town Hall, before dying there on 31 March 1388.
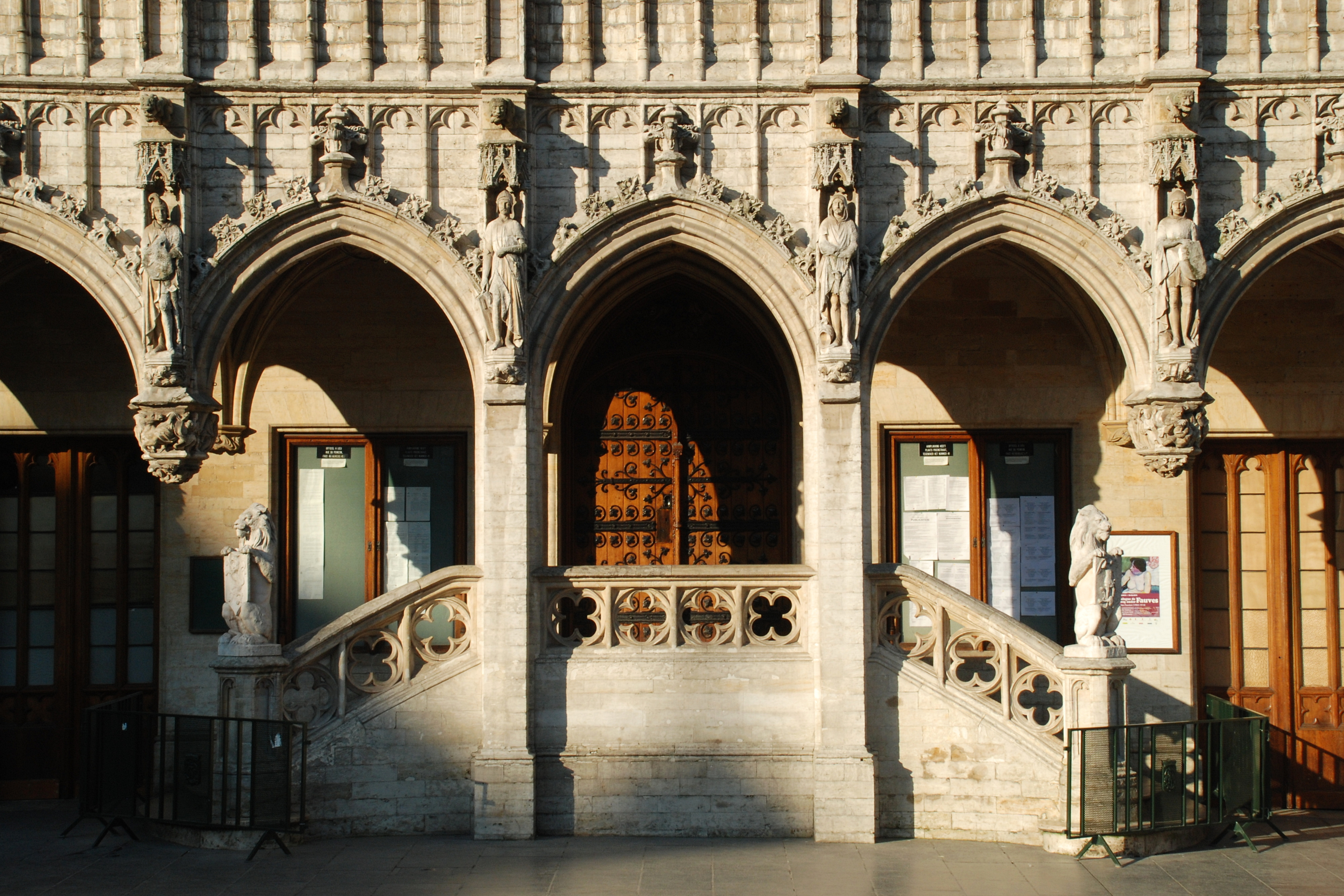
The porch

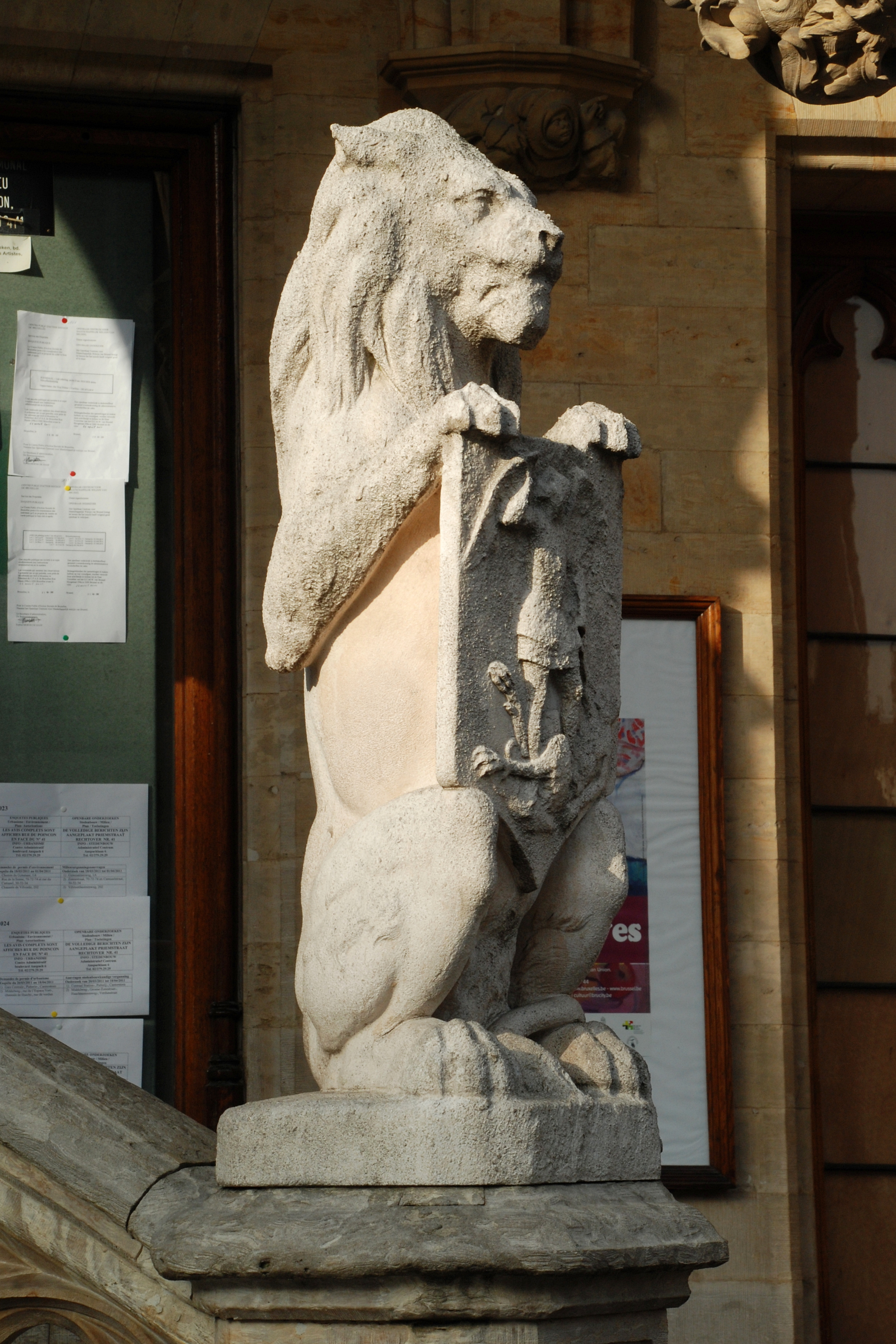
Front porch lion

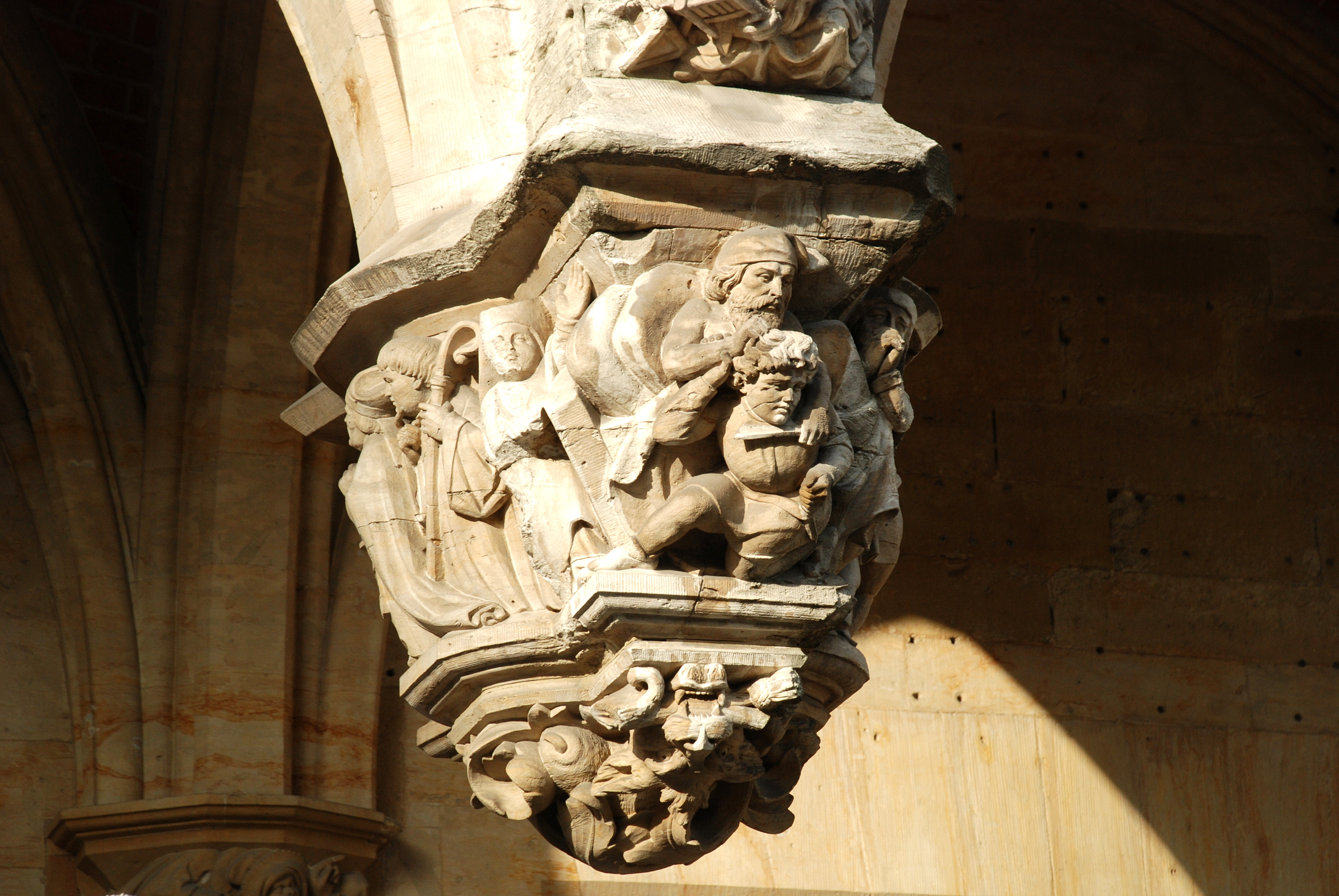
The legend of Herkenbald

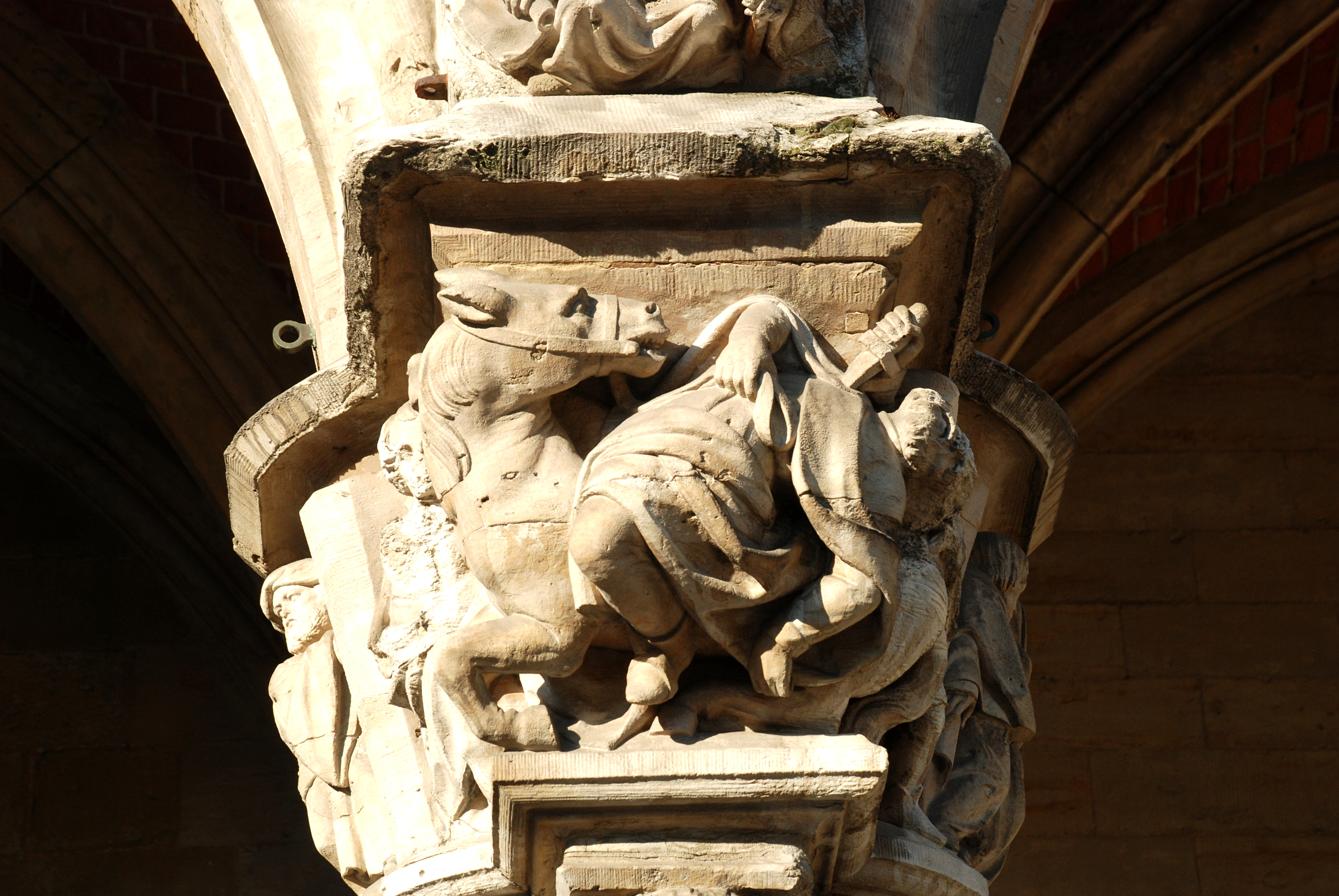
The assassination of Everard 't Serclaes

=== Interior courtyard ===
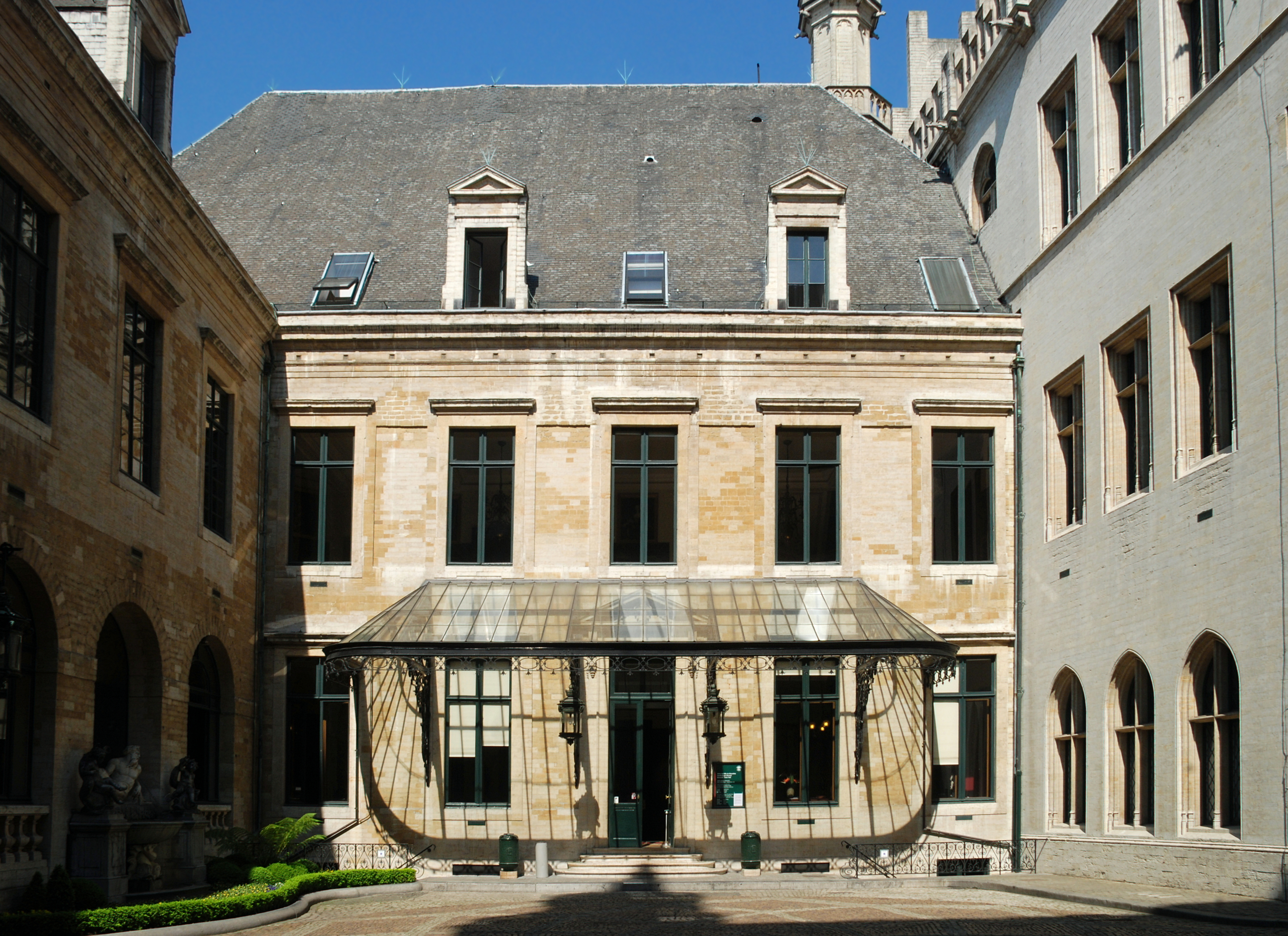
North-western façade of the inner courtyard

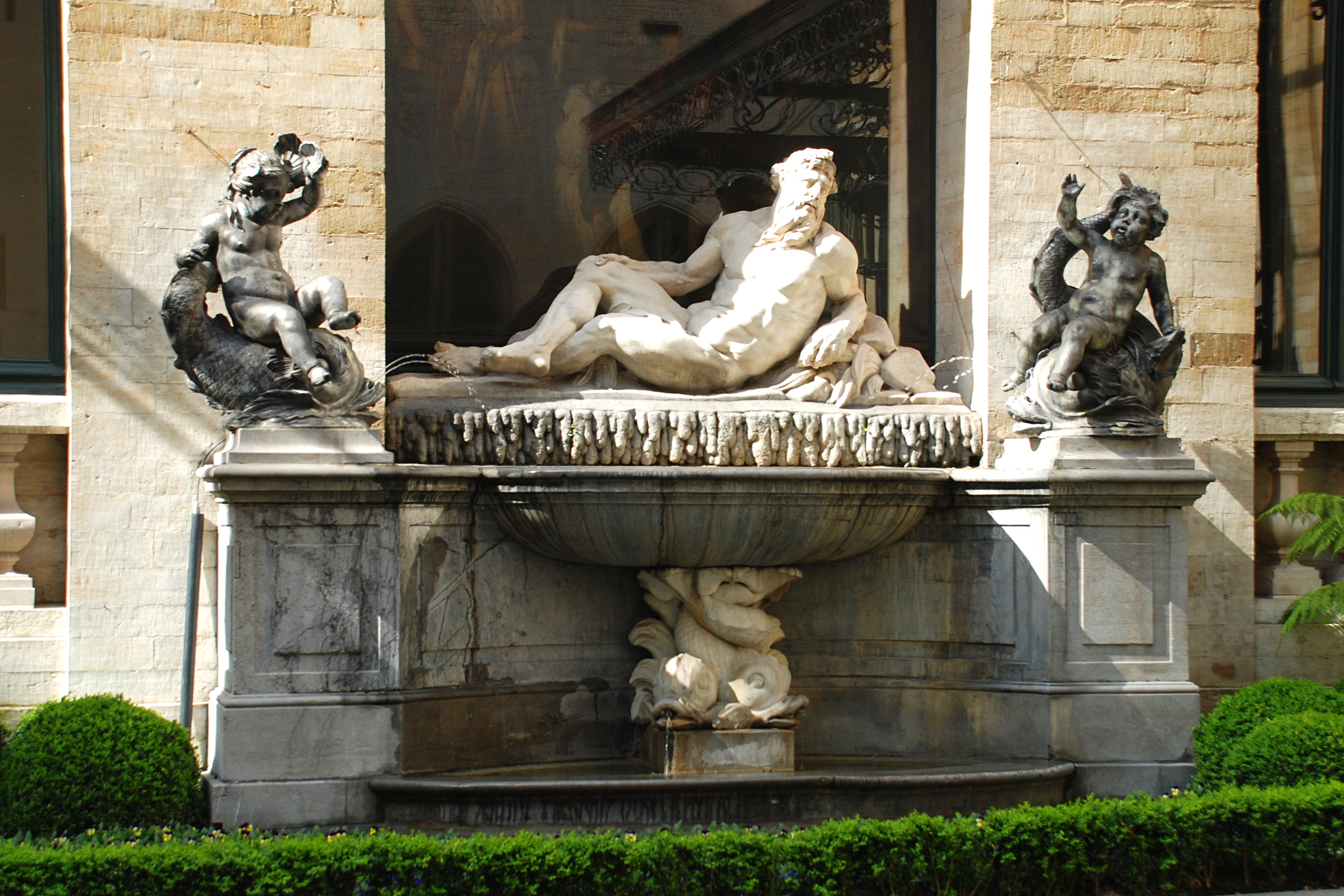
The Scheldt by Pierre-Denis Plumier (1715)

The interior courtyard has a pavement marked with a star that indicates the geographical centre of Brussels. It is decorated with two marble fountains, designed in 1714 by Johannes Andreas Anneessens, surmounted by allegorical figures of The Meuse and The Scheldt rivers, sculpted in 1715 by Jean de Kinder and Pierre-Denis Plumier, respectively.

The north-western and south-eastern façades of the courtyard have two levels pierced by large rectangular windows with wooden mullions, a flat frame, and drip edge in the shape of an entablature. These are all surmounted by a high roof pierced with dormer windows, in turn surmounted by a triangular pediment (a structure very similar to the façade on the Rue de l'Amigo). On the ground floor, a high door, surmounted by a triangular pediment and framed by large lanterns, is protected by a large 19th- and 20th-century glass awning.

The southern façade, on the ground floor, is pierced by a portal with a basket-handle arch, framed by semicircular bays and large lanterns, like the other doors of the courtyard. Upstairs, a French window topped with a curved pediment is surrounded by rectangular windows whose flat frames are adorned with crossettes.

== Interior ==
=== Vestibule ===
The main rooms are on the first floor. Passing the right entrance, visitors enter the vestibule, also known as the Princes' Gallery. It contains portraits of the princes and governors who ruled the Southern Netherlands from 1695, as well as of the Kings of the Belgians. There is also a group portrait of the intendants of the Willebroek Canal, with a view of Klein Willebroek.

The gallery connects the principal rooms of the first floor and forms part of the early-18th-century interior arrangement following the reconstruction of the Town Hall after the bombardment of 1695.

=== States of Brabant Room ===
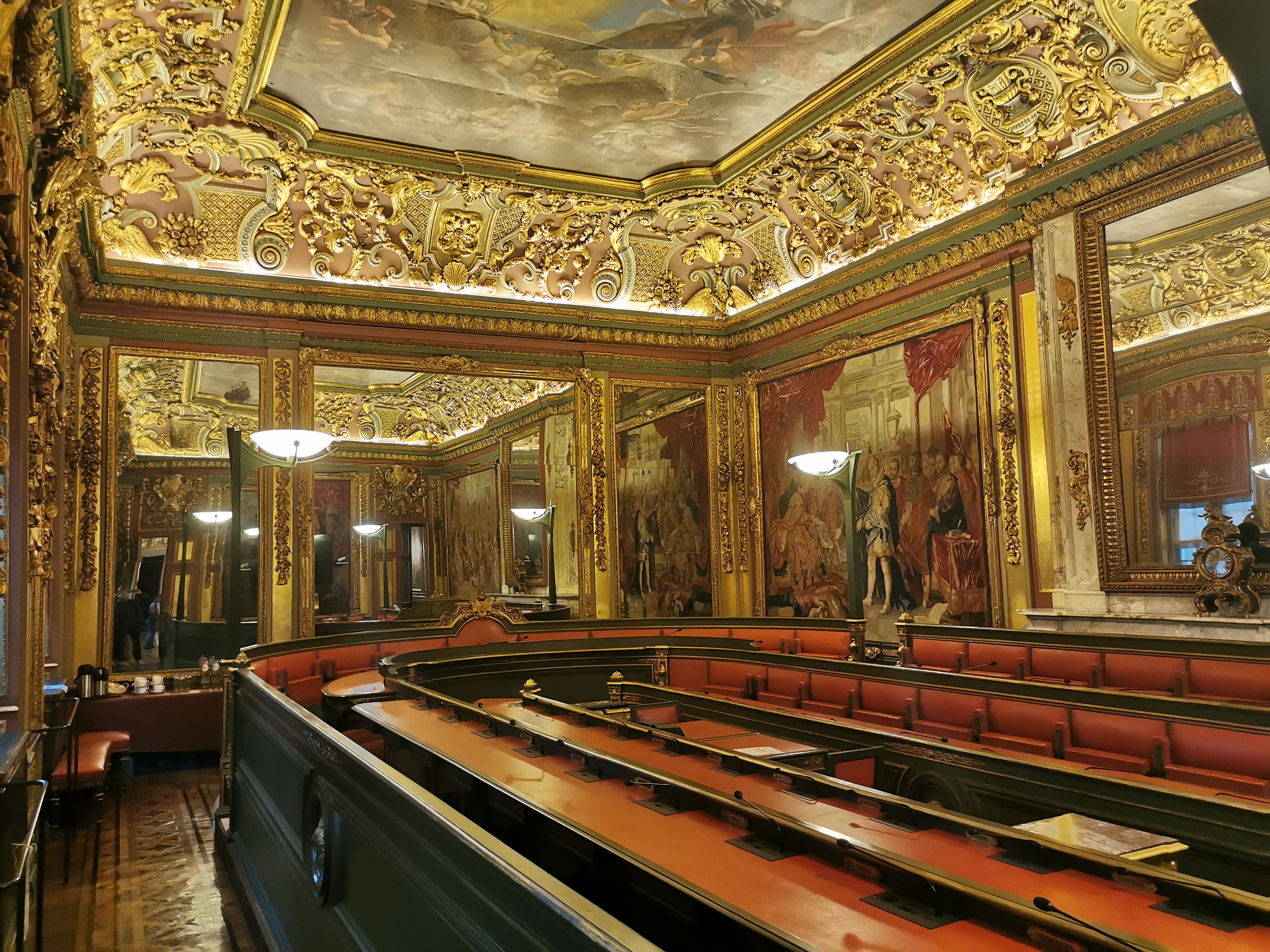
States of Brabant Room

In the long rear wing is the States of Brabant Room, built in the early 18th century for the States of Brabant, and subsequently used by the Brussels City Council until 2022. The wooden benches, formerly used by the municipal councillors, are arranged in a U-shape. The chamber and adjoining rooms have oak parquet floors with ebony inlay.

The room is decorated in the Louis XIV style. The lavish decoration includes work by the painter Victor Honoré Janssens, who executed the ceiling composition The Assembly of the Gods around 1710. The painting represents the Duchy of Brabant, with Jupiter presenting a crown to an allegorical figure of the duchy.

Three Brussels tapestries, designed by Janssens and woven by Urbain Leyniers and Hendrik II Reydams in 1717–18, commemorate episodes in the history of Brabant. They depict the inauguration of Philip the Good as Duke of Brabant in 1430, the abdication of Charles V in 1555, and the inauguration of Charles VI in 1717. They were commissioned by the States of Brabant and remain in their original setting.

The three paintings between the windows depict female figures against a golden background, representing the cities of Antwerp, Brussels, and Leuven. The fireplace and other architectural elements also incorporate heraldic references to the estates and principal cities of Brabant.

=== Maximilian Room ===
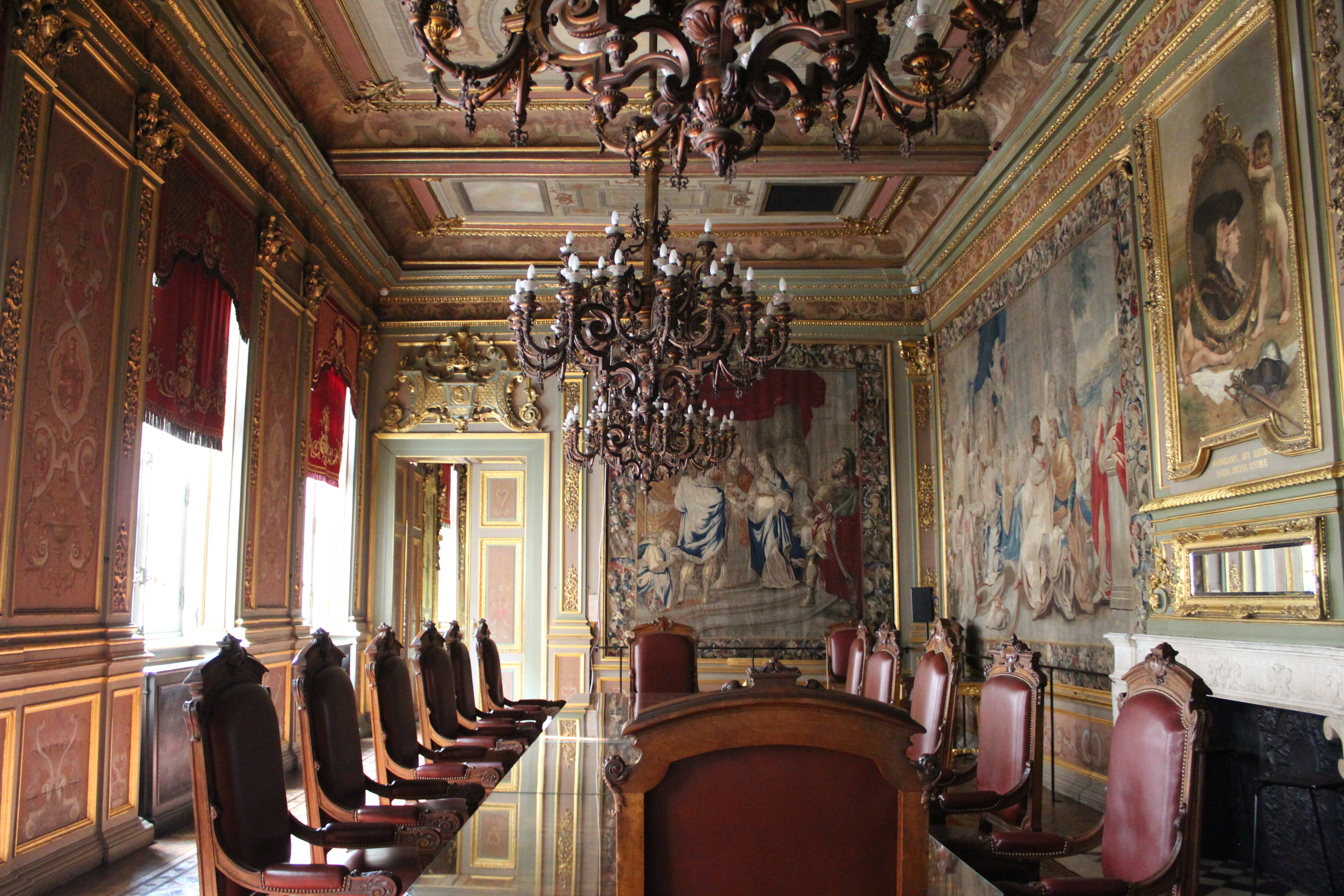
Maximilian Room

The Maximilian Room next door is named after a 19th-century double portrait of Maximilian I and Mary of Burgundy, painted by Alfred Cluysenaar in 1888–89. The space was originally intended for the administrators of the States of Brabant and was later taken over by the College of Mayors and Aldermen.

The room's early-18th-century decoration forms part of the group of Louis XIV-style interiors. The walls are covered with four tapestries from the eight-part Life of Clovis series, produced after cartons by the French painter Charles Poerson. The other four tapestries decorate the adjoining room.

=== Grangé Gallery ===
Grangé Gallery

The Grangé Gallery, on the courtyard side, connects the principal rooms of this part of the Town Hall. It contains a sequence of 18th-century portraits of Spanish and Habsburg rulers of the Southern Netherlands, painted around 1718 by Louis Grangé. The series includes Philip the Handsome, Charles V, Philip II, Albert and Isabella, Philip IV, and Charles II.

=== Mayor's Cabinet ===
Mayor's Cabinet

The Mayor's Cabinet is located on the side of the Rue Charles Buls/Karel Bulsstraat. Its antechamber, initially associated with the secretariat of the States of Brabant, contains paintings by Jean-Baptiste Van Moer, incorporated into the oak panelling. They depict parts of old Brussels that were threatened with demolition or disappeared as a result of the covering of the Senne in the 19th century.

The Mayor's Cabinet itself retains an early-18th-century ceiling painted by Jan van Orley. Its allegorical decoration incorporates coats of arms associated with the Duchy of Brabant and its principal cities, including Antwerp, Brussels and Leuven. The remainder of the room was restored in the late 19th century in the Louis XIV style.

=== Provisional Government Room ===
The Provisional Government Room, known by this name since 1830, originally served as the registry or chancery of the States of Brabant. It was redecorated between 1893 and 1897 in the Louis XIV style. The ceiling painting, executed by Omer Dierickx in 1897, represents the Independence of Belgium.

=== Staircase of honour ===
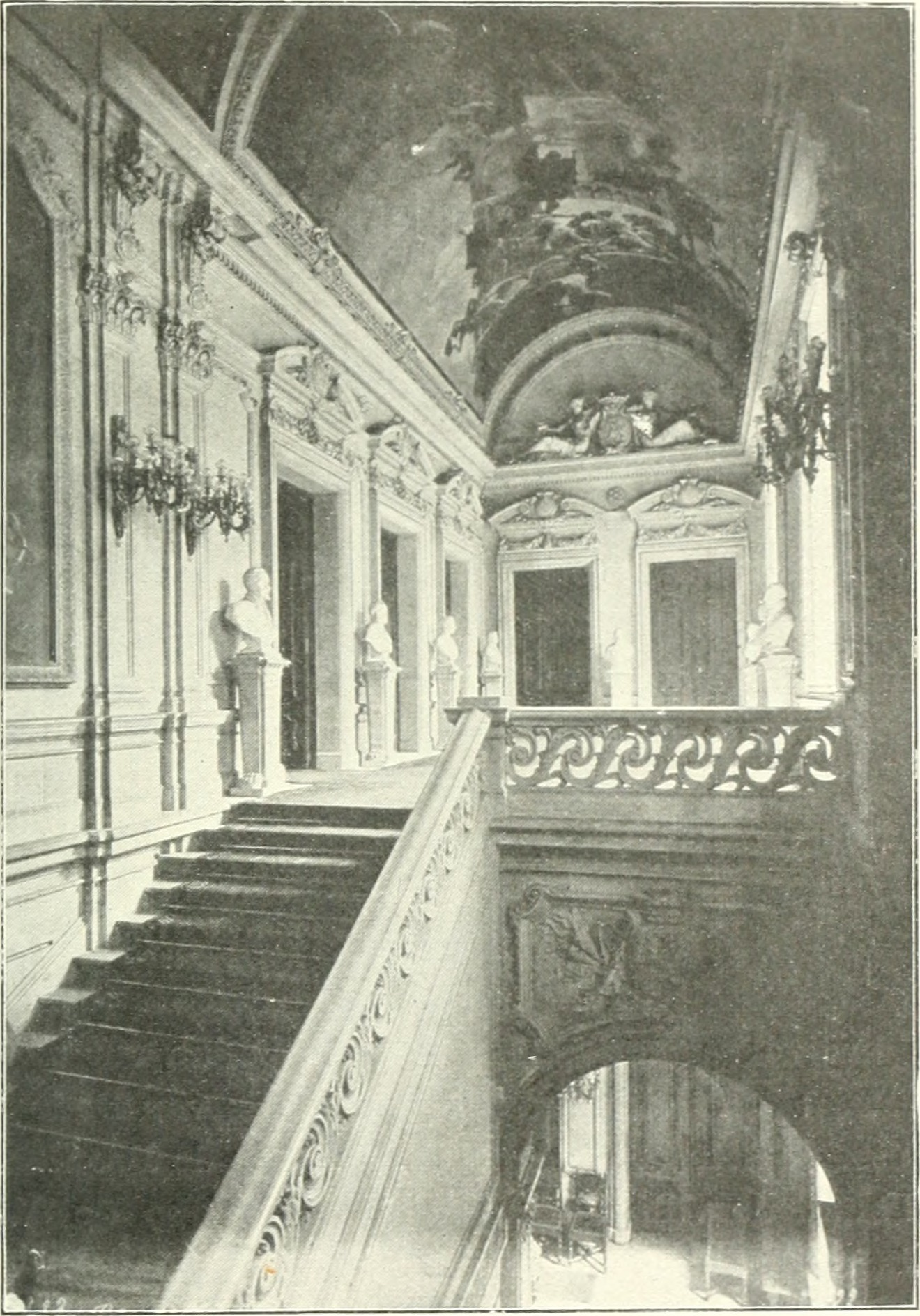
Staircase of honour

The staircase of honour is the result of a late 19th-century renovation by Victor Jamaer, which provided direct, monumental access to the Mayor's Cabinet and the Gothic Room. The original chapel was removed to make way for this staircase.

The decoration was conceived as a programme glorifying municipal power. The walls and ceilings contain paintings by Jacques de Lalaing dating from 1888–1893. Their subjects include allegories of the City of Brussels, Peace and Civic Unity, as well as historical episodes involving figures such as Frédéric de Maerselaer, Jean de Locquenghien and Everard 't Serclaes. The large ceiling composition represents a medieval belfry defended by Saint Michael and the inhabitants of Brussels against personifications of Famine, Plague and War. Busts of former mayors line the landing.

=== Gothic Room ===
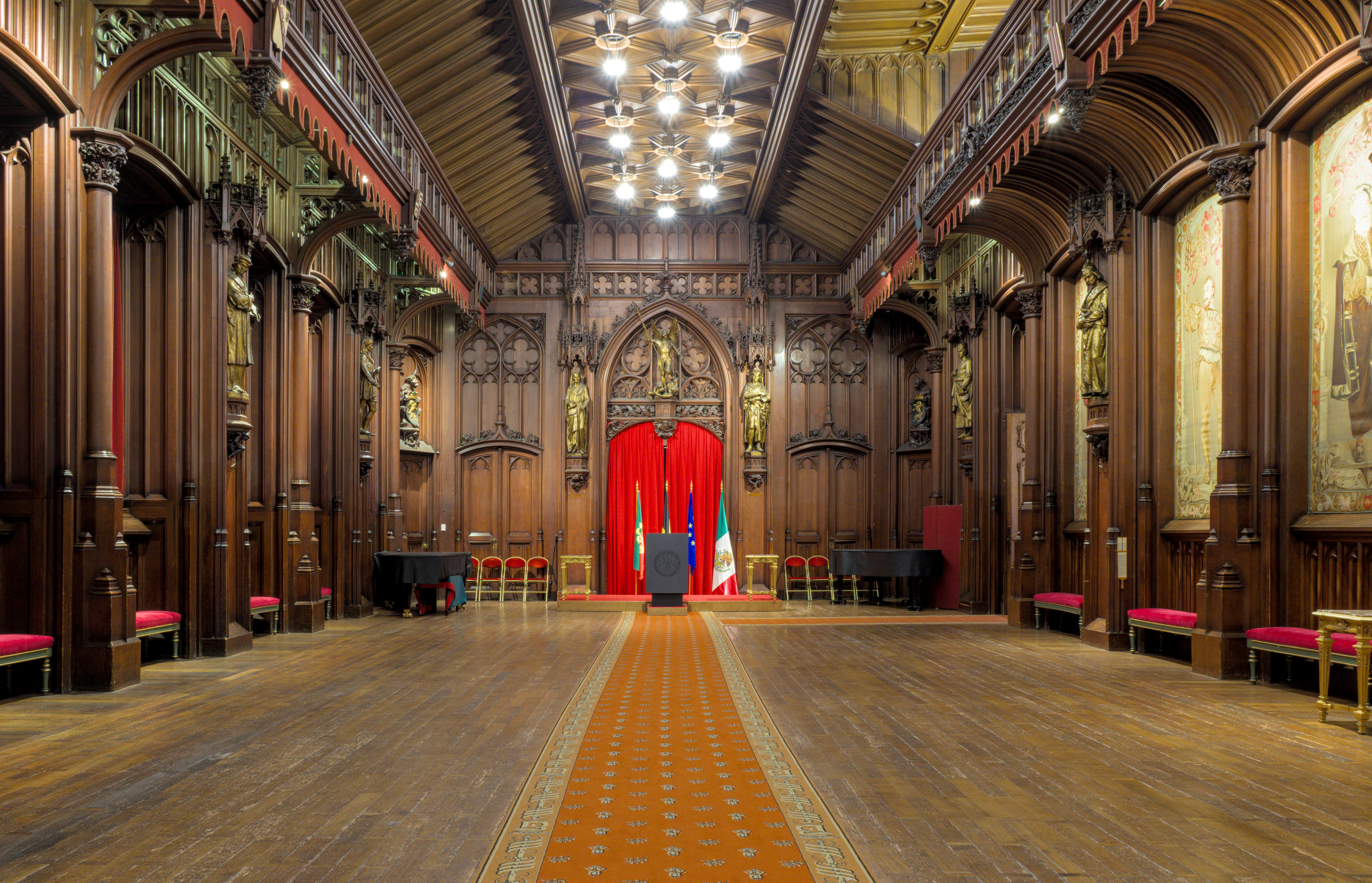
Gothic Room

The Gothic Room, in the oldest part of the Town Hall, is in fact largely a 19th-century neo-Gothic reconstruction. The wooden panelling and architectural decoration are the work of Victor Jamaer. The room was originally the Great Hall and courtroom, where supreme justice was administered. The present room still incorporates historical references to this former judicial function, while also reflecting the building's 19th-century restoration.

Eight tapestries, known as The Guilds and Oaths of Brussels, have been incorporated into the room's walls. They were produced between 1877 and 1881 by the Braquenié manufactory from Mechelen, after designs by Willem Geets. The four narrower ones on the long sides of the room represent the old Guilds of Brussels, including masons, embroiderers, brewers, tapestry-makers, painters, and goldsmiths. The four larger ones framing the doorway on the short side relate to the weapons' sworn companies: fencers, crossbowers, arquebusiers, and archers.

The long wall, opposite the Rue Charles Buls, was formerly decorated with The Justice of Trajan and Herkinbald, the justice panels of Rogier van der Weyden that were destroyed in the 1695 bombardment.

=== Wedding Room ===
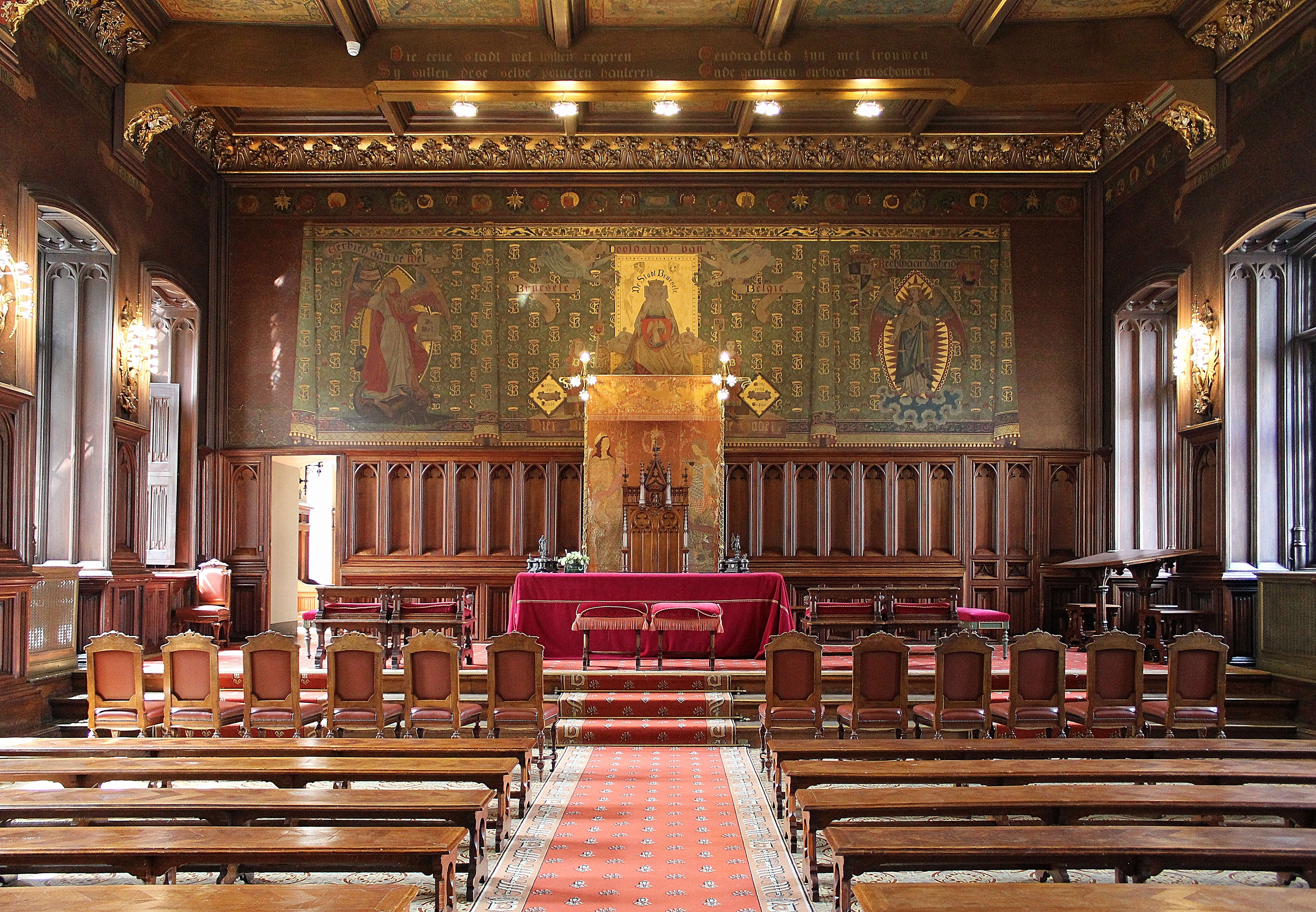
Wedding Room

The Wedding Room is situated on the side of the Grand-Place. Like the Gothic Room, its earlier function was associated with the administration of justice, and it underwent a 19th-century neo-Gothic transformation.

The room contains a monumental mural by Charles Léon Cardon, Allegory of Marriage, painted around 1880–1882. The composition represents the City of Brussels presiding over a marriage, accompanied by allegorical figures associated with Justice and Law.

A Middle Dutch poem has been reproduced on the roof beams, which, as early as the 15th century, recalled the proper way to govern the city. The corbels bear the coats of arms of the Seven Noble Houses of Brussels, and the ceiling those of the guilds.

An embroidered panel behind the marriage table was designed by Isidore de Rudder and executed by his wife Hélène in 1897. It incorporates an iris and personifications of Love and Law. The furniture and lighting also form part of the room's late-19th-century decorative programme.

== Influence ==
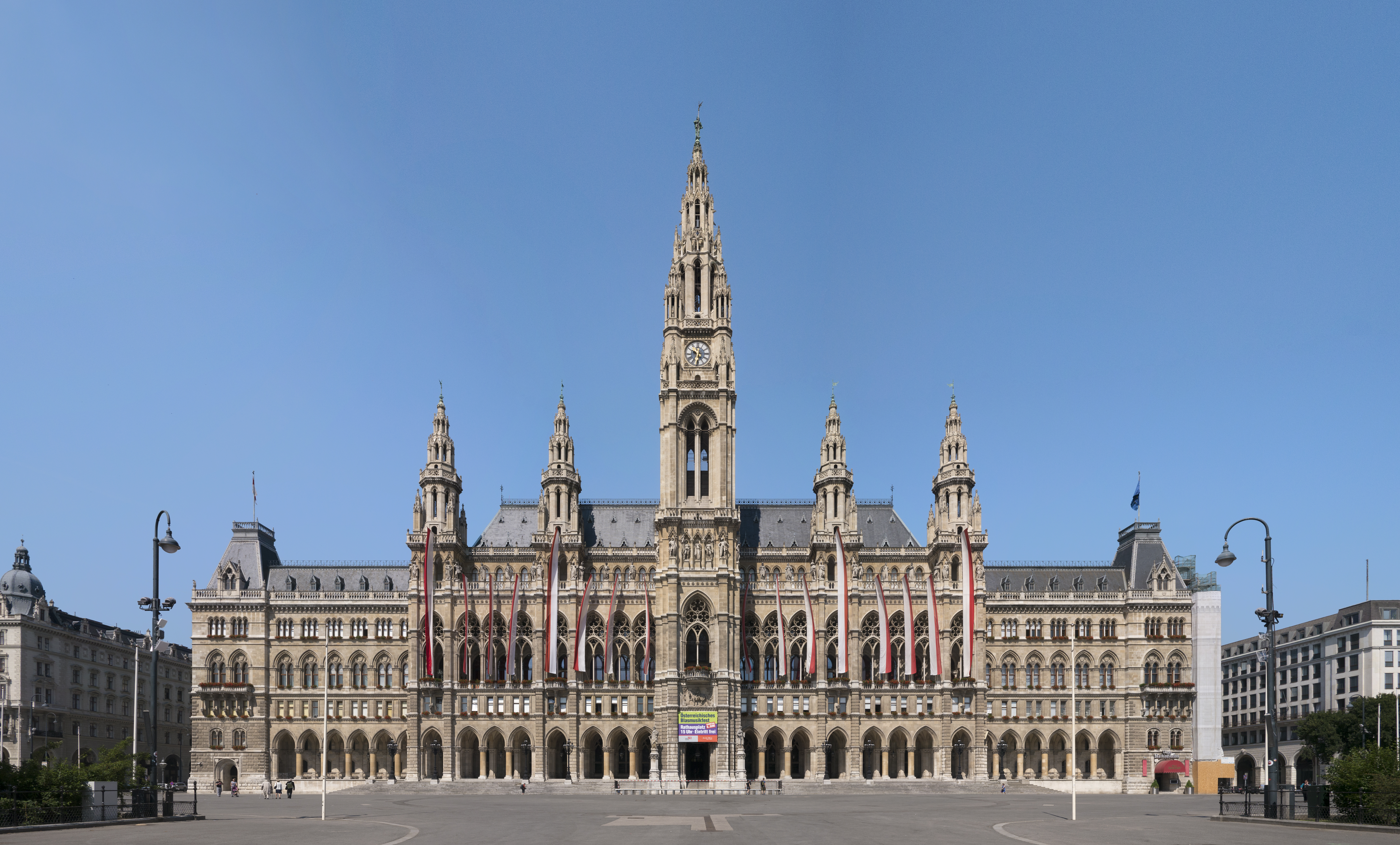
The City Hall of Vienna is inspired by that of Brussels.

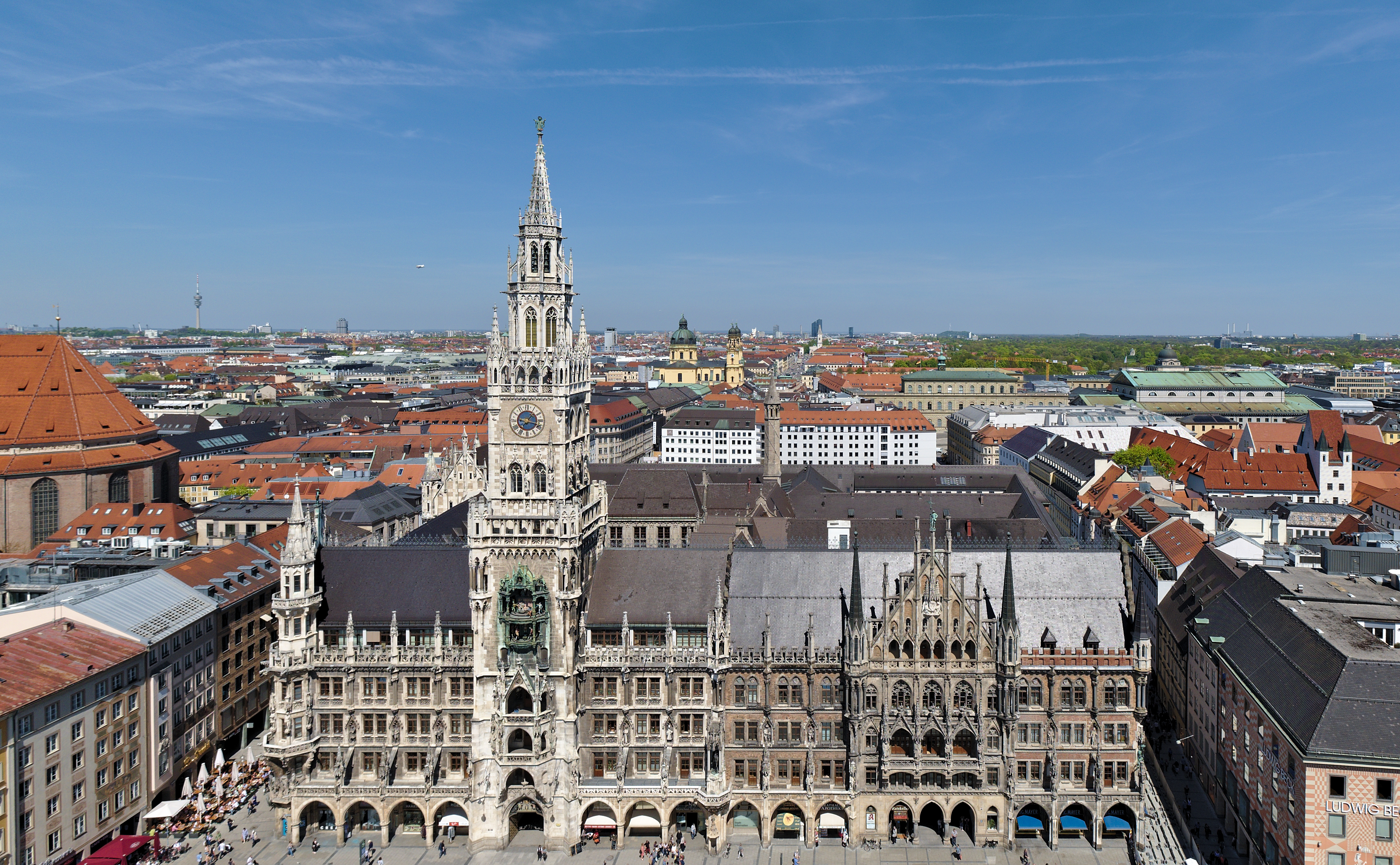
Brussels' Town Hall was also a model for Munich's New Town Hall.

Brussels' Town Hall became an important architectural model for Gothic town halls in Europe. The building's monumental scale, elaborate façades, sculptural decoration and prominent tower made it one of the most celebrated examples of medieval civic architecture. Its influence was already felt in the Duchy of Brabant, particularly in Leuven, whose 15th-century Town Hall was conceived partly in response to the Brussels building. Contemporary records indicate that Leuven sent workmen to visit the Brussels construction site during the early stages of its own project.

The Town Hall was also regarded as an exemplary work of architecture by the late 19th century, when the Gothic Revival and the historicist movement stimulated renewed interest in medieval civic architecture. The Austrian architect Friedrich von Schmidt drew inspiration from it when designing the City Hall in Vienna. Georg von Hauberrisser also used the building's Brabantian pattern as an architectural model while creating the New Town Hall of Munich. The latter has been described by the art historian Sascha Köhl as an almost slavish copy of the Brussels building.

== See also ==
- Belfry of Brussels
- History of Brussels
- Culture of Belgium
- Belgium in the long nineteenth century
- List of tallest structures built before the 20th century
