= Jacob van Thienen =

Flemish architect of the early 15th century

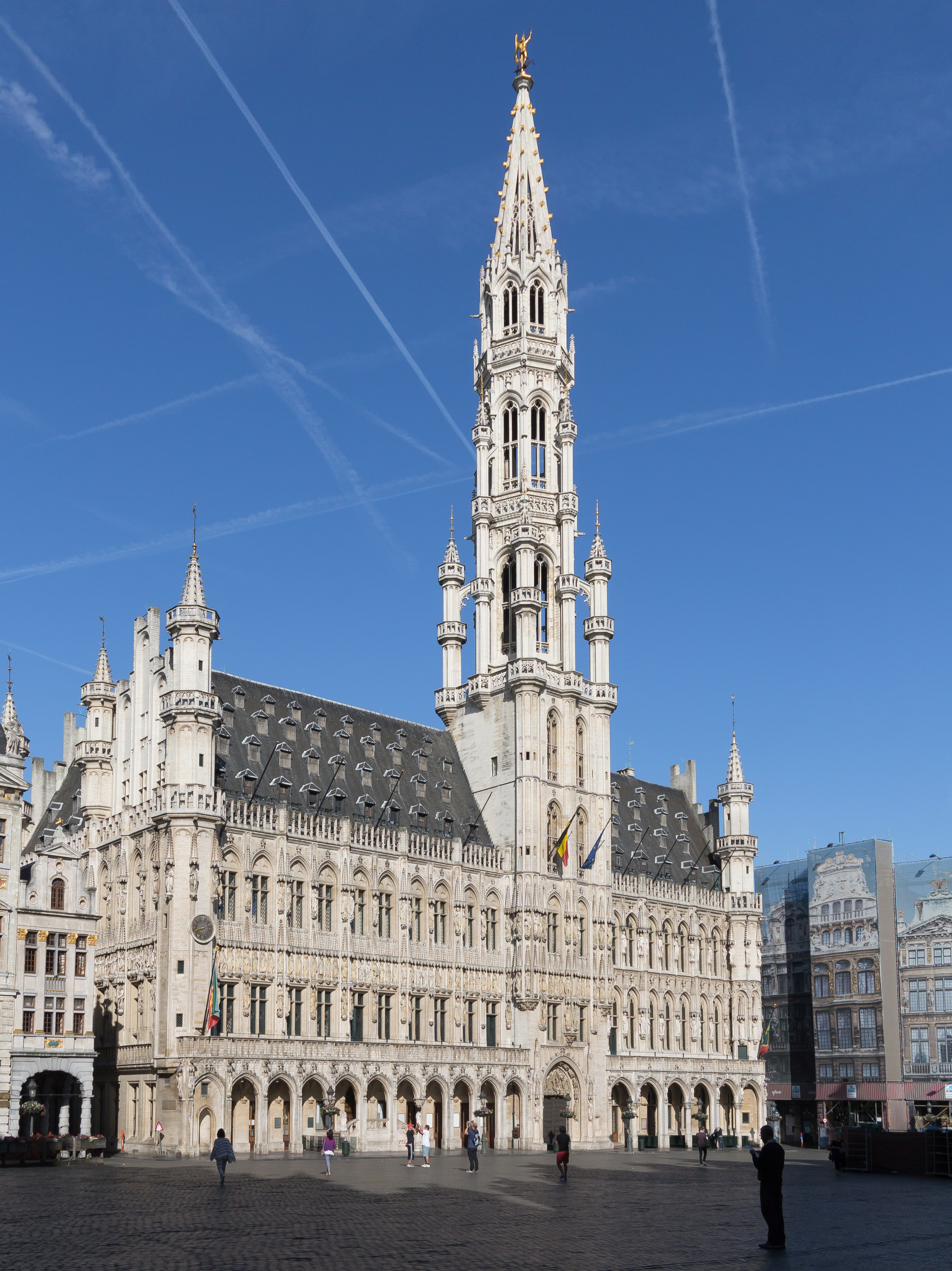
Brussels' Town Hall

Jacob (or Jaak, or Jacques) van Thienen (also called van Gobertingen) was a Flemish architect of the early 15th century (his dates of birth and death are unknown). He is believed to have designed Brussels' Town Hall (French: Hôtel de Ville, Dutch: Stadhuis), around 1402. The Brabantine Gothic building, which stands in the city's Grand-Place/Grote Markt (main square), is widely regarded as a masterpiece of medieval European secular architecture. The building's distinctive tower was, however, the work of a different architect, Jan van Ruysbroeck.

Van Thienen may also have built the southern aisle of the Cathedral of St. Michael and St. Gudula in Brussels, around 1400.
