= Jan van Ruysbroeck (architect) =

Flemish architect of the early 15th century

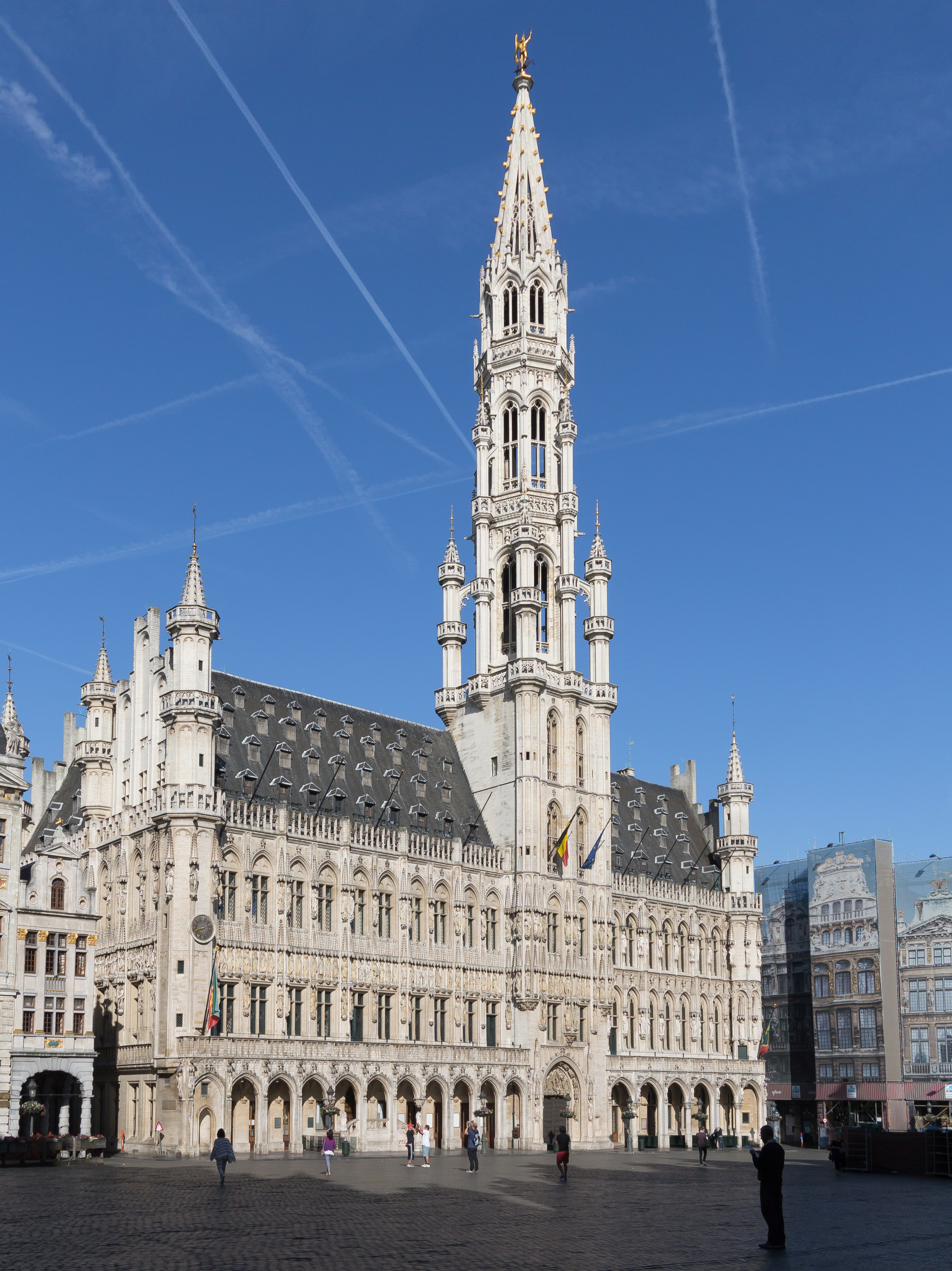
Brussels' Town Hall

Jan van Ruysbroeck (also known as Jan van den Berghe) was a Flemish architect of the early 15th century (his dates of birth and death are unknown). He served as official architect to the Duke of Brabant. His best known work was the tower of Brussels' Town Hall (French: Hôtel de Ville, Dutch: Stadhuis). The Brabantine Gothic building, which stands in the city's Grand-Place/Grote Markt (main square), is widely regarded as a masterpiece of medieval European secular architecture. It was designed by Jacob van Thienen some time around 1402 and van Ruysbroek's tower was added between 1444 and 1463.

Other works by van Ruysbroeck include:

- the fountain at the Hospital of Our Lady, in Oudenaarde (1443–1445);
- the tower of the Church of St. Gertrude, in Leuven, (completed 1453);
- part of the Collegiate Church of St. Peter and St. Guido, in Anderlecht (1479–1485);
- probably the towers of the Cathedral of St. Michael and St. Gudula, in Brussels (1470–1485).
