= Aert van den Bossche =

Early Netherlandish altarpiece painter

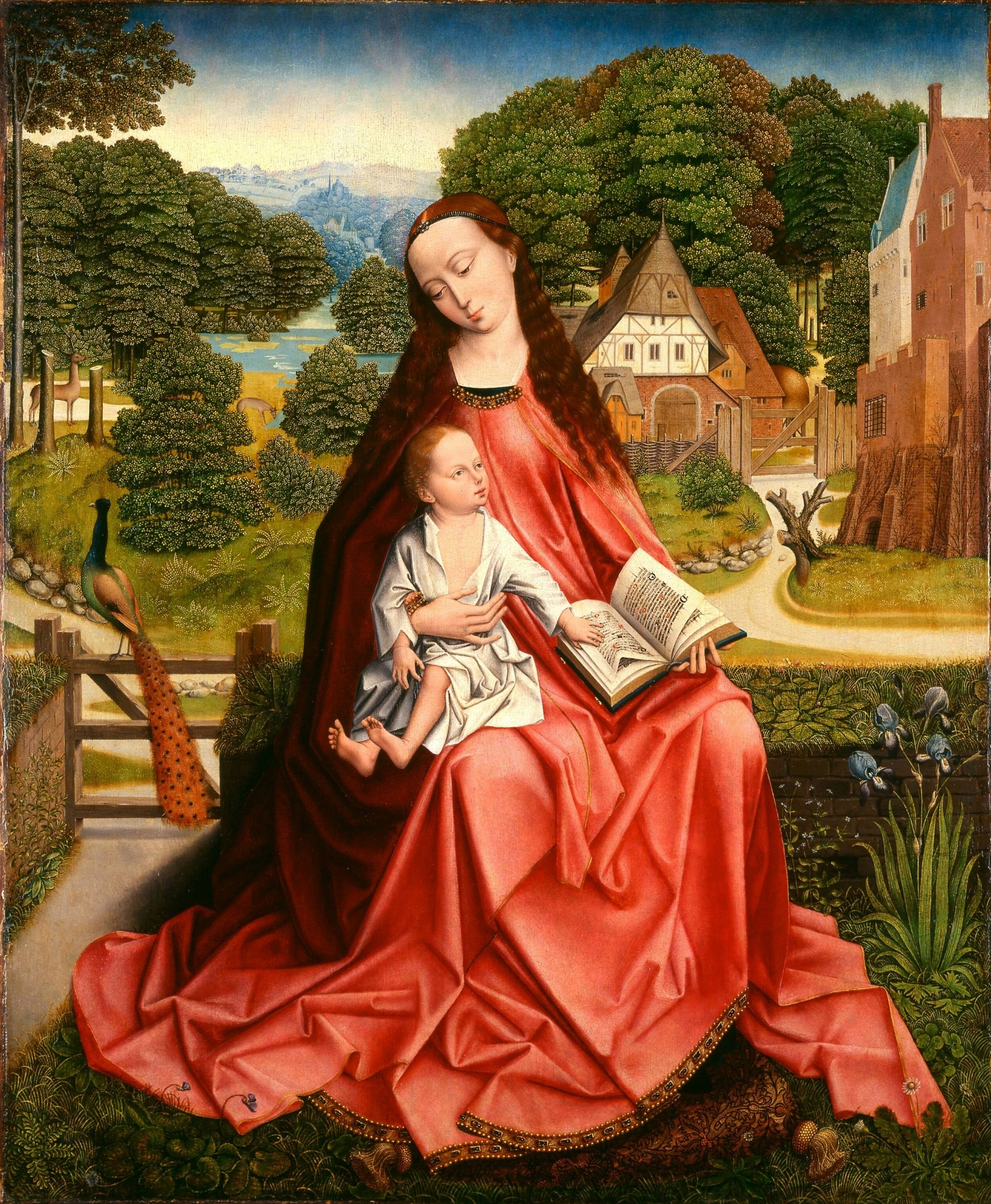
Virgin and Child in a Landscape

Aert van den Bossche or the Master of the Crispinus and Crispinianus-Legend (also known as Aert Panhedel, Aert van Panhedel, Arnoul de Panhedel, Arnoul Vanden Bossche and Harnoult van den Boske) was an Early Netherlandish painter of altarpieces, active in Brussels and Bruges in the late 15th century. There is still doubt as to whether he should be identified with the Master of the legend of St. Barbara or was only one of the artists active in a workshop responsible for the works of that master.

== Life ==
Little is known about the life of Aert van den Bossche. It is believed that he was born ca. 1455 or earlier. He was possibly originally from Bruges although he or his ancestors may have come from the town of 's-Hertogenbosch. This can possibly be concluded from the fact that in Brussels where he was active from the 1490s he was recorded in 1499 as 'Aert van Panhedel alias van den Bossche, schilder' (painter). The town of 's-Hertogenbosch is colloquially referred to as Den Bosch (hence van den Bossche would mean "from 's-Hertogenbosch') and his name could therefore indicate he was originally from there. This assumption is further confirmed by the fact that when he registered in the Bruges Guild of Saint Luke he signed with the name 'Harnoult van den Boske'. It is also known that Aert's father, the painter Yanne van den Bossche, had received some orders from the Brussels shoe-makers' guild as well. Aert van den Bossche had a son Gielis, a.k.a. Gielis Panhedel, who signed Gilken van den Booeske and was an accomplished painter.

Aert van den Bossche became a city councillor of Brussels. There is speculation that he may have been a pupil or assistant of Hugo van der Goes.

== Work ==
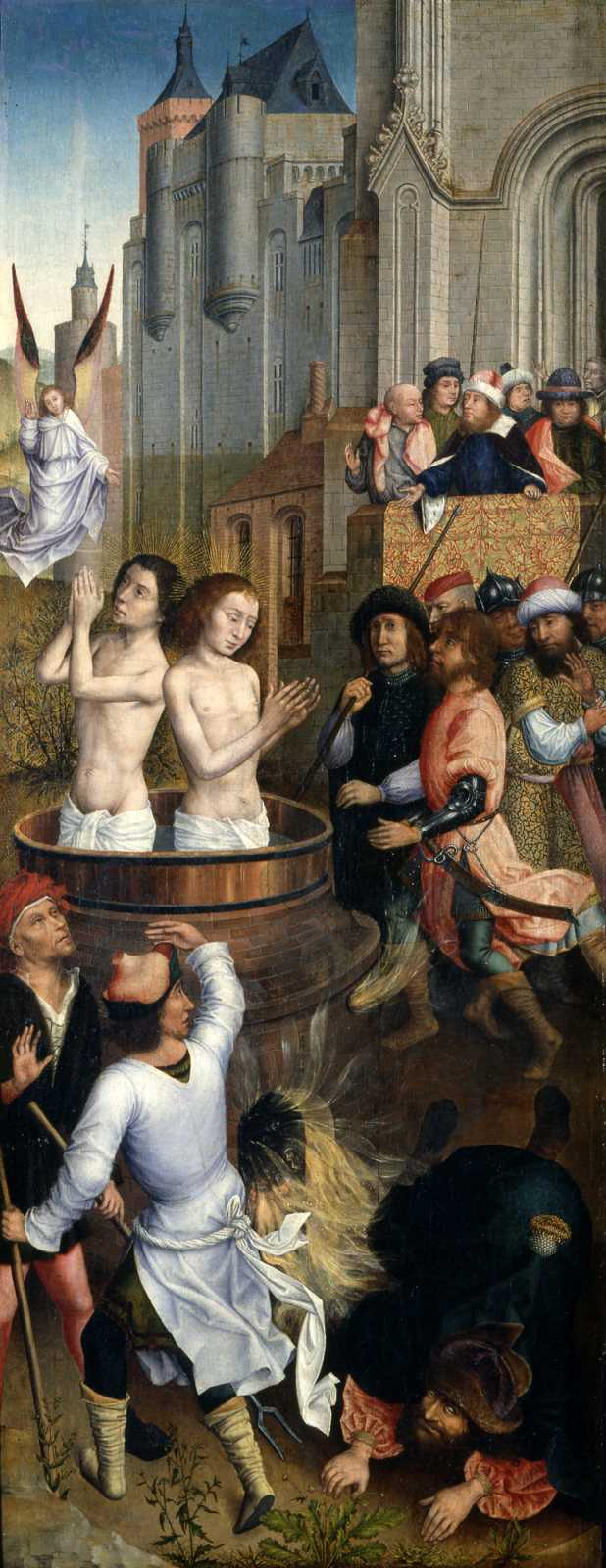
Martyrdom of Saints Crispin and Crispinian (right wing)

There is uncertainty about which works can be attributed to Aert van den Bossche. The famous Virgin and Child in a Landscape, c. 1492-1498 on view at the Minneapolis Institute of Arts is currently attributed to: 'artist(s) unknown, possibly Master of the Madonna Grog or Aert van den Bossche, formerly Master of the Embroidered Foliage'. The St Augustine sacrificing to an idol of the Manichaeans is now attributed to the Master of the legend of St. Barbara. The name 'Master of the legend of St. Barbara' was created by the German art historian Max Jakob Friedländer to denote an anonymous painter or a group of painters who worked out of Bruges and Brussels.

The only written proof that a specific artwork had been commissioned from him personally is a receipt of 1490 for the remuneration paid by the Brussels shoemakers' guild for the triptych of the Martyrdom of the Saints Crispin and Crispinian. The triptych was intended for the guild's altar in the St Nicholas Church. The discovery of this receipt led to the identification of an extant painting depicting the saints in question, and to the identification of its artist earlier referred to as the 'Master of the Legend of St. Barbara' with Aert van den Bossche. Since this discovery the triptych has been removed from the oeuvre of the Master of the Legend of St. Barbara. There is yet no unanimous view as to Aert van den Bossche's exact relationship with the Master of the Legend of St. Barbara and whether Aert van den Bossche formed part of the workshop of the Master of the Legend of St. Barbara.

On stylistic grounds it is believed that Aert van den Bossche painted the right wing of the Triptych with the Miracles of Christ. Some specialists have claimed that he also collaborated with the Master of the Legend of St. Barbara: for example, in the panel of the Scenes of the Legend of Henry II, the figures in the section on the left could possibly be the work of van den Bossche.

== The Martyrdom of Saints Crispin and Crispinian ==
The subject of the painting is the martyrdom of the Saints Crispin and Crispinian. According to the Christian legend the two saints were twin brothers born to a noble Roman family in the 3rd century AD. They were allegedly persecuted, tortured and put to death for their faith by Rictus Varus in Belgic Gaul. They became the patron saints of cobblers, tanners, and leather workers, and the church honoured them with a feast day celebrated on 25 October.

The martyrdom triptych has not survived in its original form, as the central part of the triptych has been separated from the wings. In the early 19th century, the central part (or the largest middle panel) was purchased in St. Petersburg from a private owner by Count Stanisław Potocki, Master of the Horse (Konyushy) at the court of the Russian Tsar during the foreign Partitions of Poland. It was put on display at his Wilanów Palace, which Potocki had turned into an art centre. Unlike other Polish nobles at the time, Potocki did not take part in the November Uprising against Russia.

For over a hundred years after its last verified purchase, nobody knew what subject matter was depicted in the composition. Speculation included the Ten thousand martyrs and other themes known already from Dürer. The subject matter was finally discovered by Jan Białostocki (pl) from the Polish Academy of Sciences, professor of Warsaw University and one-time curator at the National Muzeum in Warsaw. He identified some 13 plants in the painting, most of them used in leather tanning. The shoemakers' guild was a "connective tissue" in his subject-matter analysis. The written record confirms that the masterpiece was donated by the guild as an altarpiece for the St. Nicholas Church, located next to the Bourse, in Brussels to secure their own prosperity. The subject matter relates to the shoemaker trade. The painting depicts the legendary martyrdom of Saints Crispin and Crispinian. They had their bones broken (left), toenails extracted (upper left), skin ripped off of their backs in long narrow strips (center); they were thrown off the cliff into the Aisne river (upper right) and when they refused to drown they were boiled alive in a cauldron (upper corner) before being beheaded.

The central panel of the painting is on display at the Museum of King Jan III's Palace at Wilanów in Warsaw.

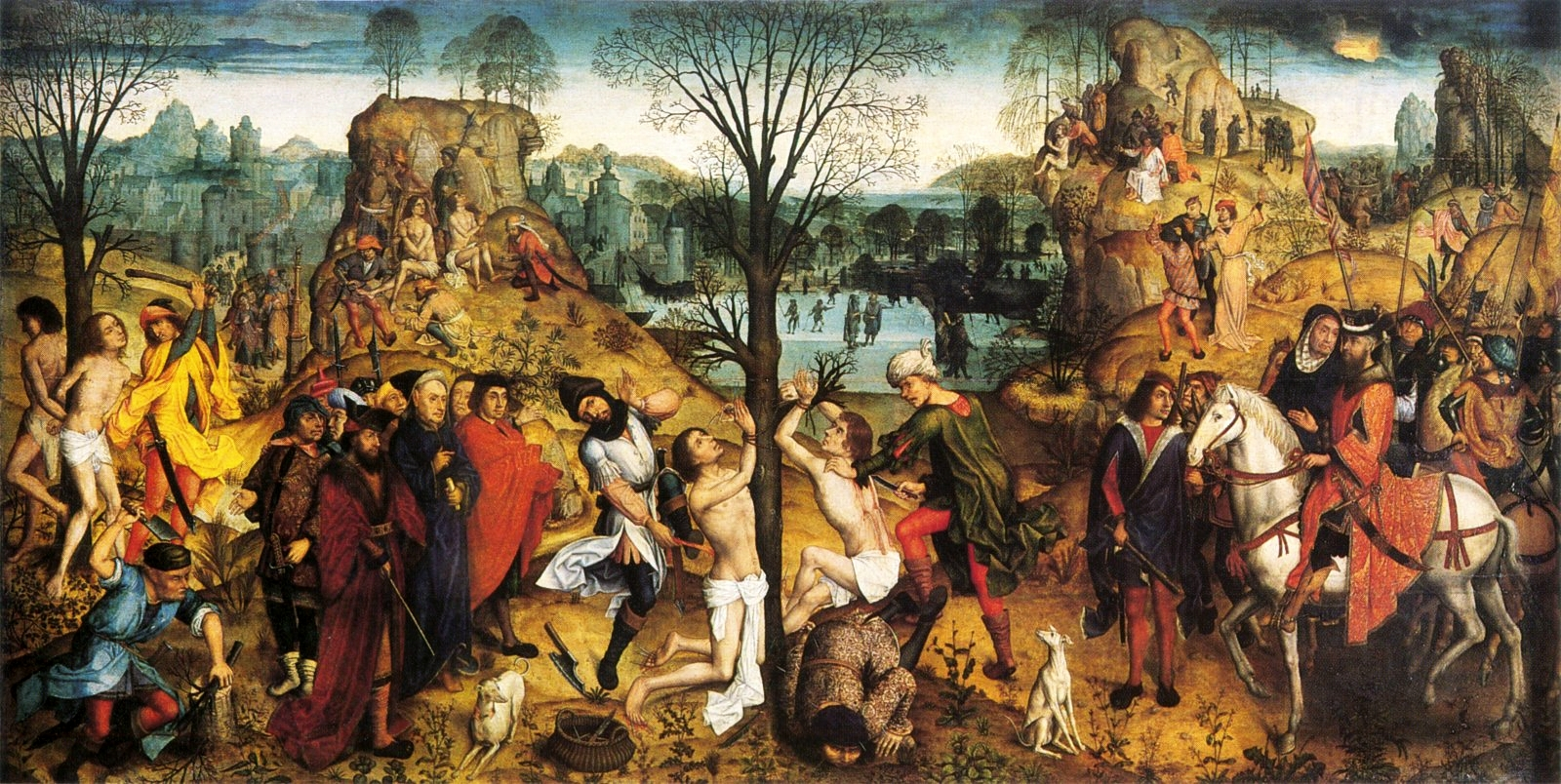
The Martyrdom of Saints Crispin and Crispinian by Aert van den Bossche, 1494, 98 × 190 cm. Museum of King Jan III's Palace at Wilanów, Warsaw

Efforts to locate the missing panels continue even if only for the sake of historical record. Nothing is known about the left-hand side of the triptych including subject matter. Part of the outside panel of the right-hand wing (cut in half) is in the Moscow Pushkin Museum, while the inside of the same right wing panel is in the Museum of the City of Brussels.

== Triptych with the Miracles of Christ ==
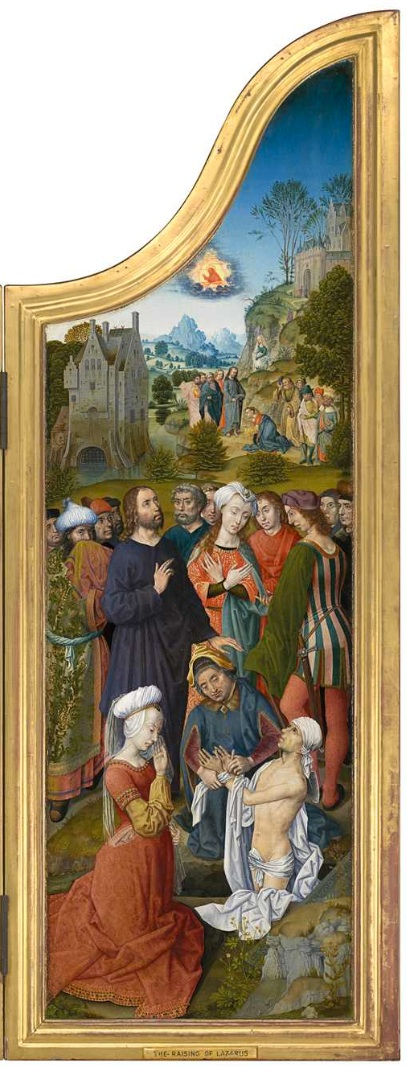
Triptych with the Miracles of Christ: The Raising of Lazarus

The Triptych with the Miracles of Christ is held in the collection of the National Gallery of Victoria in Melbourne. It is a fairly small scale work measuring about 112 by 184 cm. Although there is still no unanimity on the attribution of each panel of the work, it is generally believed that the triptych represents a collaboration between three artists working in Brussels at the same time: the Master of the Legend of Saint Catherine (central panel), the Master of the Princely Portraits (left wing) and Aert van den Bossche.

There is evidence to suggest that the works were not produced in a single workshop where they could have been placed side by side during their execution. Rather, the fact that the line of the horizon varies in each panel and that the scale of the figures nor the perspective match up are indications that the three parts of the triptych were produced in separate locations where each artist worked in isolation from the others. It has been assumed that a possible reason for this work method had to do with the urgency of the commission or that it was in response to specific instructions of the commissioner of the work.

The person who commissioned the work was Adolph of Cleves, Lord of Ravenstein, a powerful individual connected to the rulers of Burgundy. He is depicted in the front and middle of the left panel entitled The Marriage at Cana. The triptych depicts on the left wing Christ's first miracle at the wedding of Cana and ends with the last miracle of Christ, the raising of Lazarus, which is depicted on the right wing attributed to van den Bossche. The central panel depicts the miracle of the multiplication of the loaves.
