= Brussels City Museum =

Museum in Brussels, Belgium

- Musée de la Ville de Bruxelles (French); Museum van de Stad Brussel (Dutch)
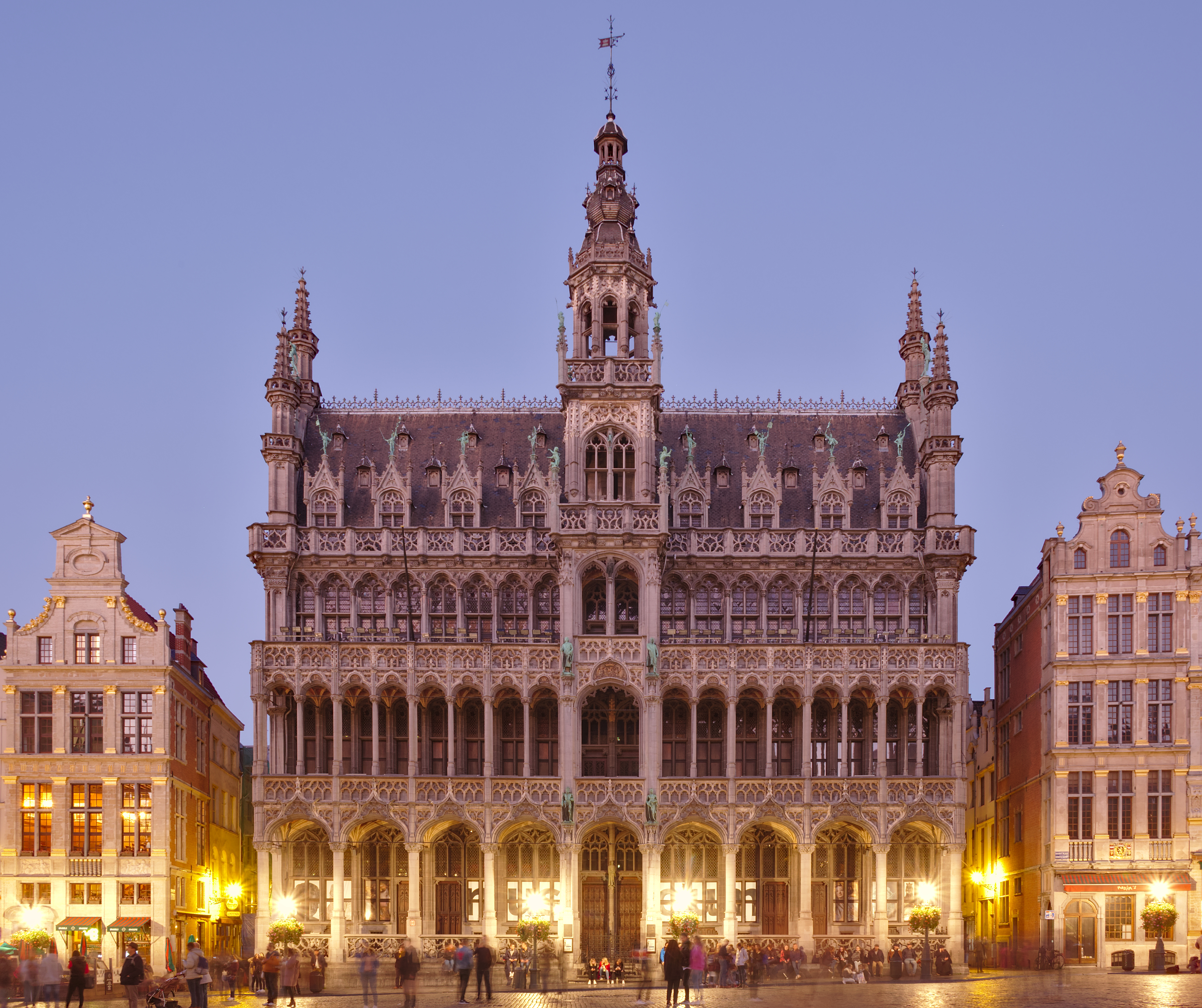
- The King's House or Bread House building, housing the Brussels City Museum
- Interactive fullscreen map
- Established: 1887; 139 years ago
- Location: Grand-Place/Grote Markt, 1000 City of Brussels, Brussels-Capital Region, Belgium
- Coordinates: 50°50′49″N 4°21′10″E
- Type: History museum
- Owner: City of Brussels
- Website: www.brusselscitymuseum.brussels/en

The Brussels City Museum (French: Musée de la Ville de Bruxelles [myze də la vil də bʁysɛl]; Dutch: Museum van de Stad Brussel [myˈzeːjʏɱ vɑn də stɑd ˈbrʏsəl]) is a municipal museum on the Grand-Place/Grote Markt of Brussels, Belgium. Conceived in 1860 and inaugurated in 1887, it is dedicated to the history and folklore of the City of Brussels from its foundation into modern times, which it presents through paintings, sculptures, tapestries, engravings, photos and models, including a notable scale-representation of the town during the Middle Ages.

The museum is situated on the north side of the square, opposite Brussels' Town Hall, in the Maison du Roi ("King's House") or Broodhuis ("Bread House" or "Bread Hall"). This building, erected between 1504 and 1536, was rebuilt in the 19th century in its current neo-Gothic style by the architect Victor Jamaer. Since 1998, it has also been listed as a UNESCO World Heritage Site, as part of the square.

== History ==
The idea of establishing a municipal museum first arose in 1860, when the City of Brussels acquired the then-neglected King's House on the Grand-Place/Grote Markt. At the initiative of the mayor Charles Buls and the city archivist Alphonse Wauters, the first municipal museum was finally established there and officially opened on 12 June 1887. It was initially housed on the second floor of the King's House. From 1928, the entire building was assigned to the museum's collections. After transformations, it reopened its doors in 1935 on the occasion of the Brussels International Exposition. On 9 March 1936, the building was designated a historic monument, at the same time as the Town Hall. It has been a UNESCO World Heritage Site since 1998, as part of the Grand-Place's registration.

== Highlights ==
The Brussels City Museum features more than 7,000 items, including artefacts, paintings and tapestries from Brussels' history, such as the Town Hall's original sculptures. There are two dioramas of Brussels in its early days and as it began to flourish in the 1500s. The museum's painting collections include works by the Flemish Primitive Aert van den Bossche (15th century) and the French historical painter Charles Meynier (18th century).

The original statue of Manneken Pis is on view on the top floor. Many items of the statue's wardrobe, consisting of around one thousand different costumes, could also be viewed in a permanent exhibition inside the museum until February 2017, when a specially designed museum, called Garderobe MannekenPis, opened its doors nearby at 19, rue du Chêne/Eikstraat.

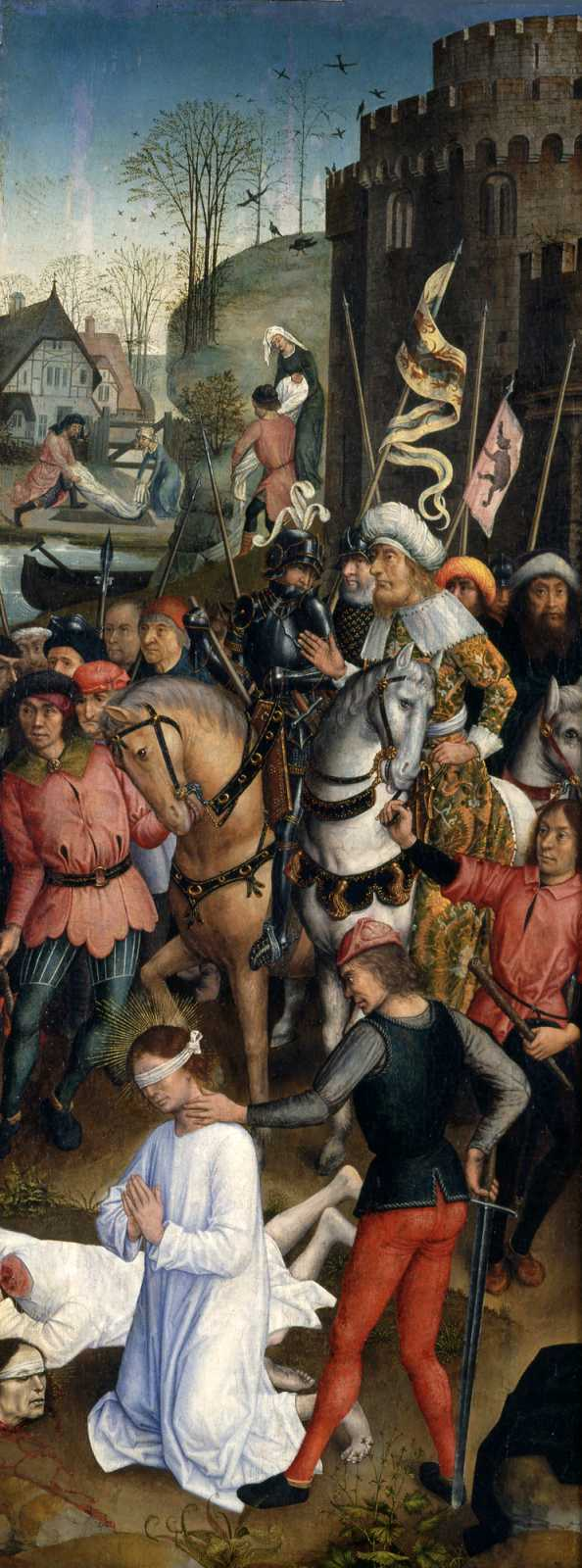
Martyrdom of Saints Crispin and Crispinian, Aert van den Bossche, 1490

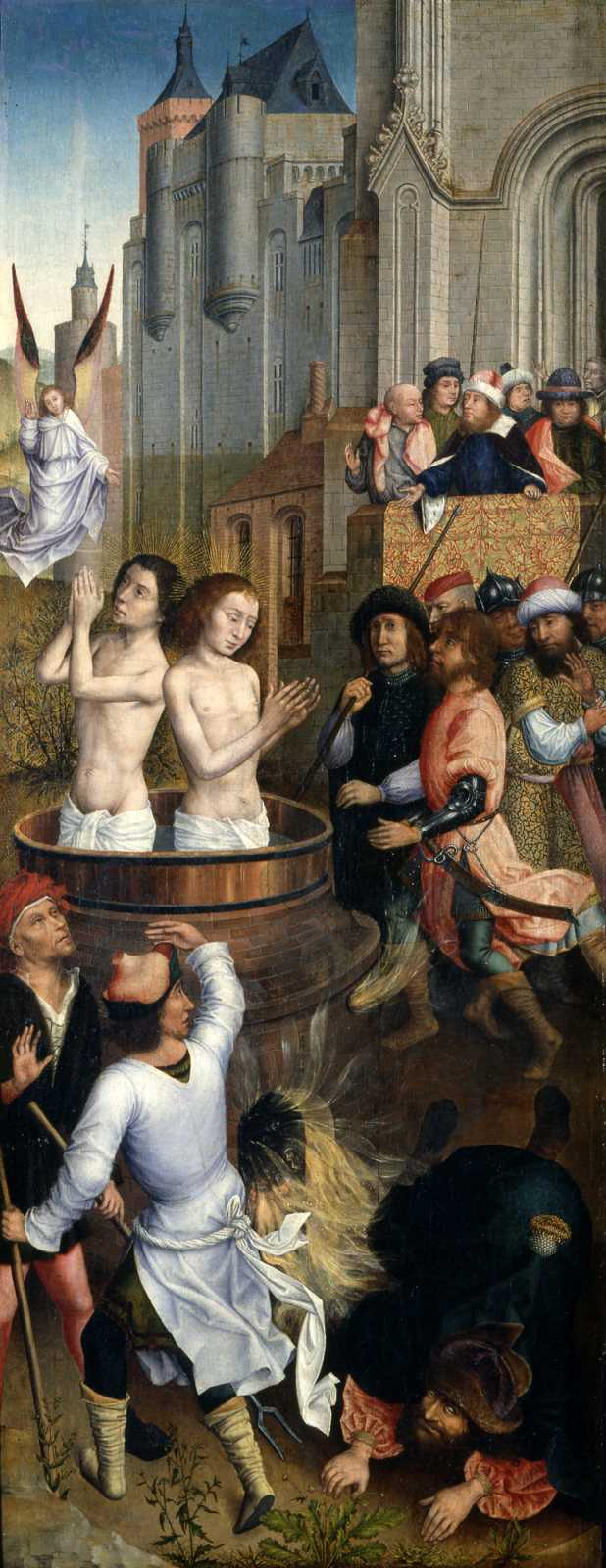
Martyrdom of Saints Crispin and Crispinian, Van den Bossche, 1490

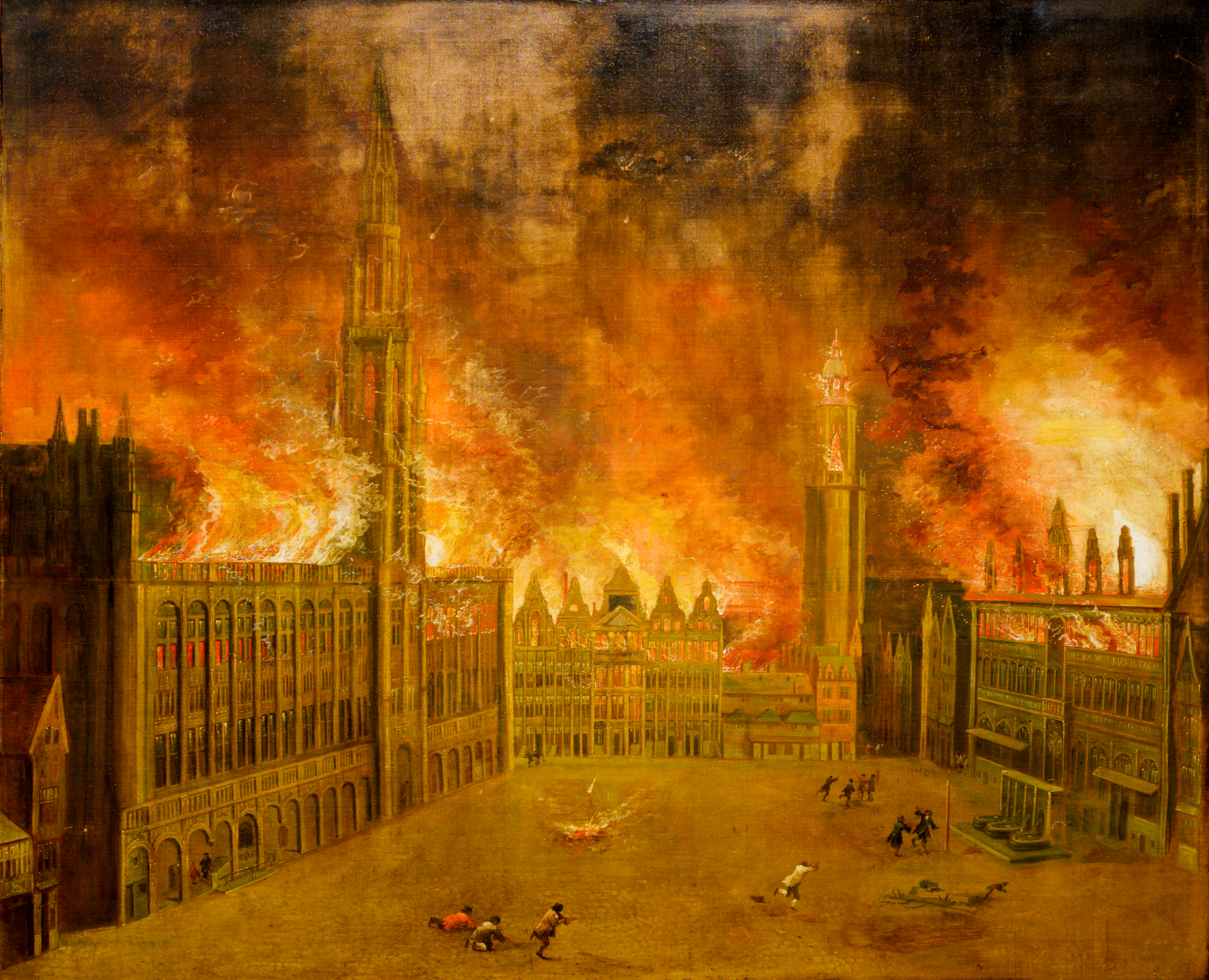
The Grand-Place on fire during the night of 13th to 14th August 1695, Anonymous; 146 x 180 cm

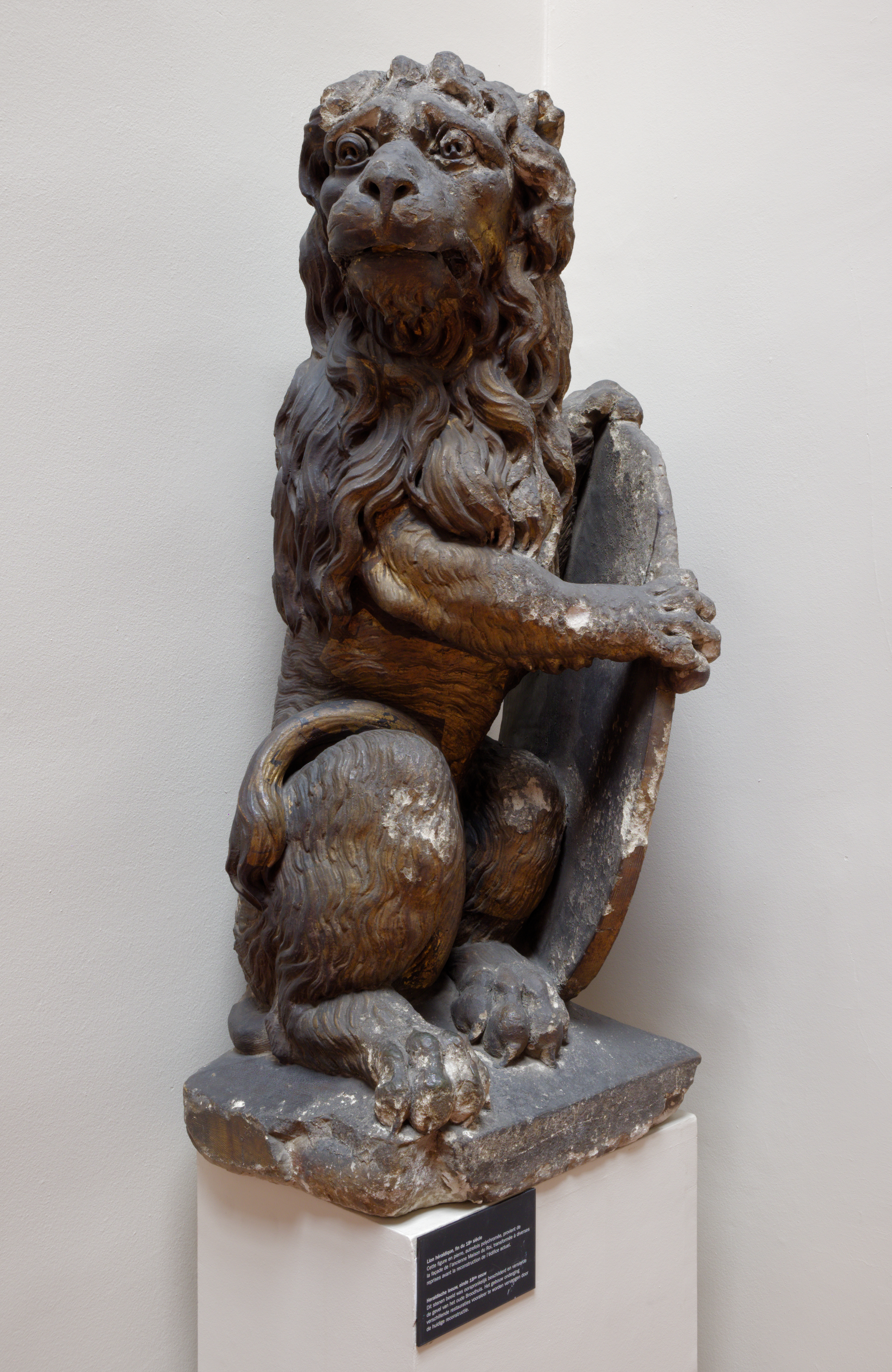
Heraldic lion, end of the 18th century

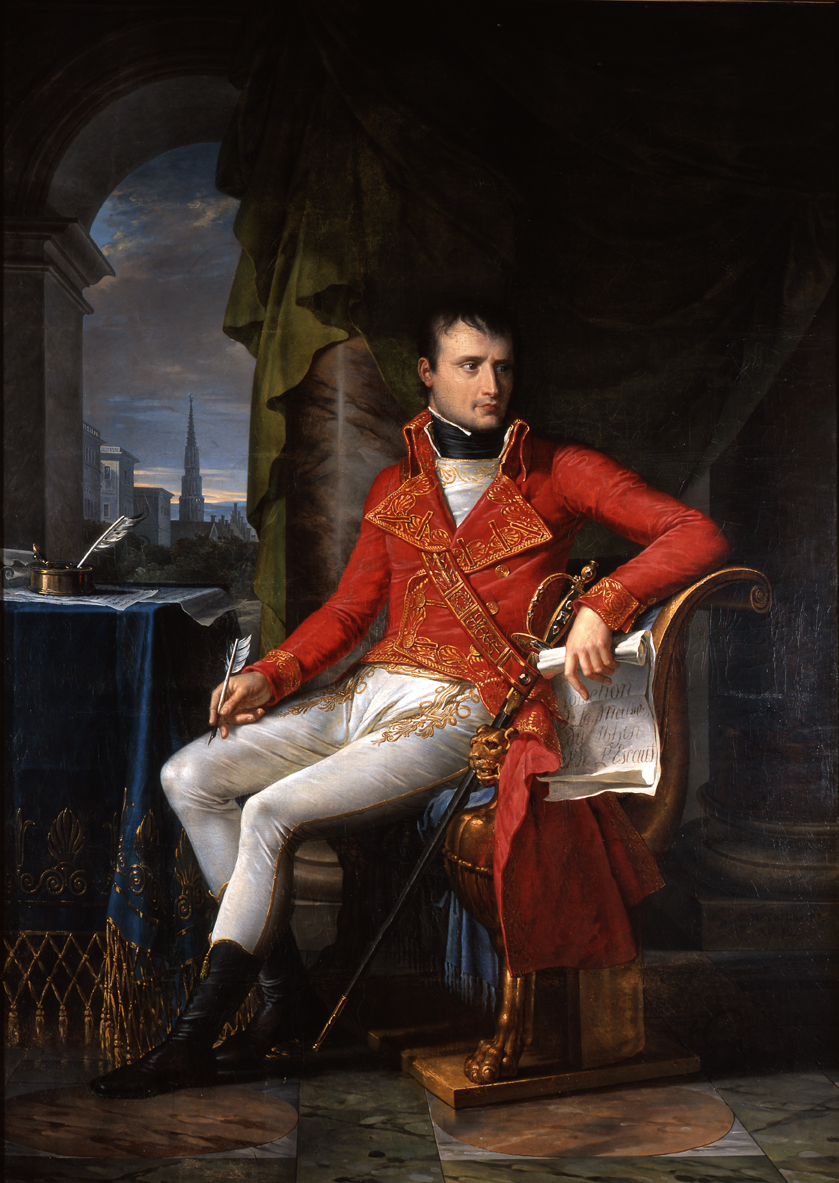
Bonaparte first consul, Charles Meynier, 1804

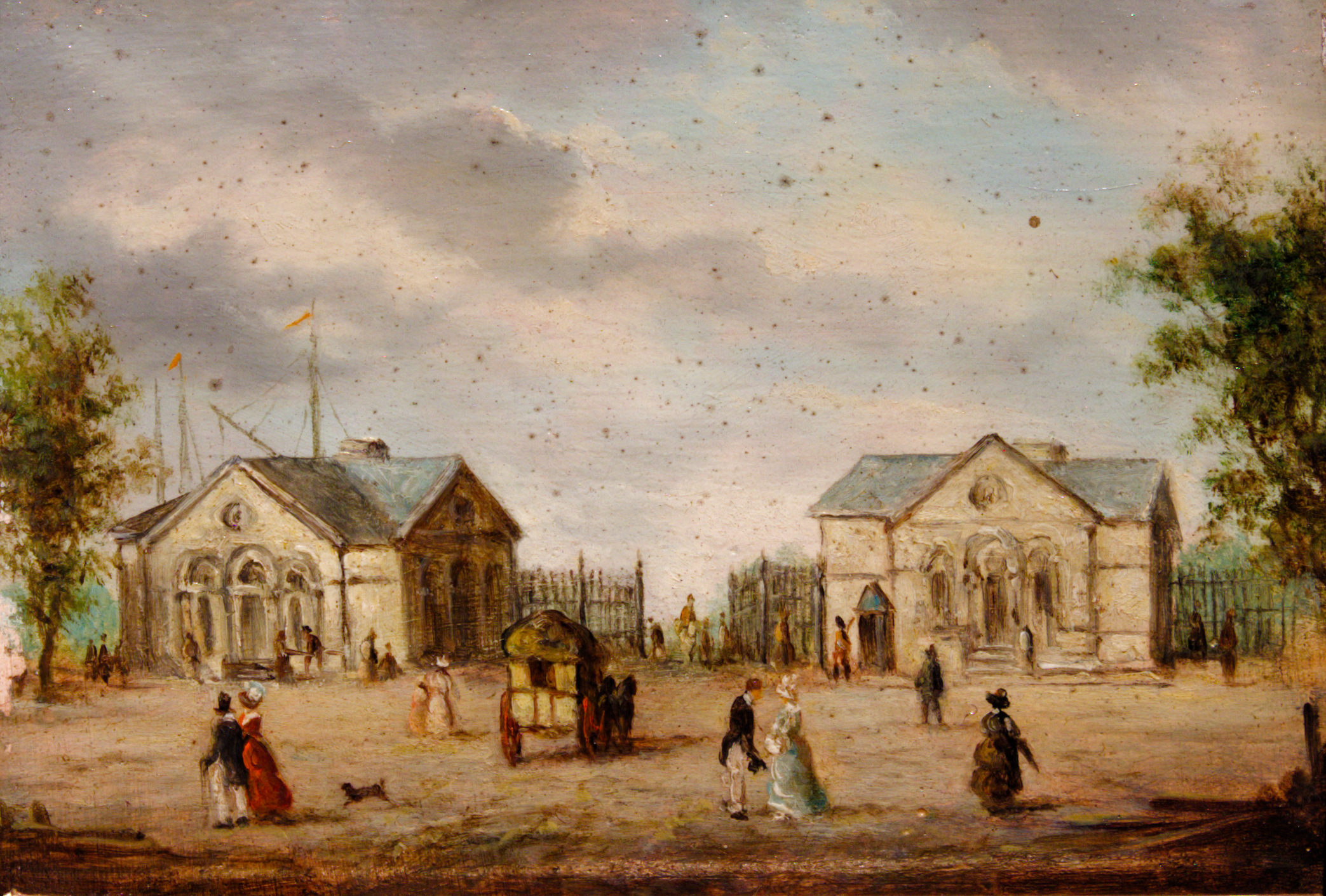
The Botanical Garden, Paul Vitzthumb, 1828

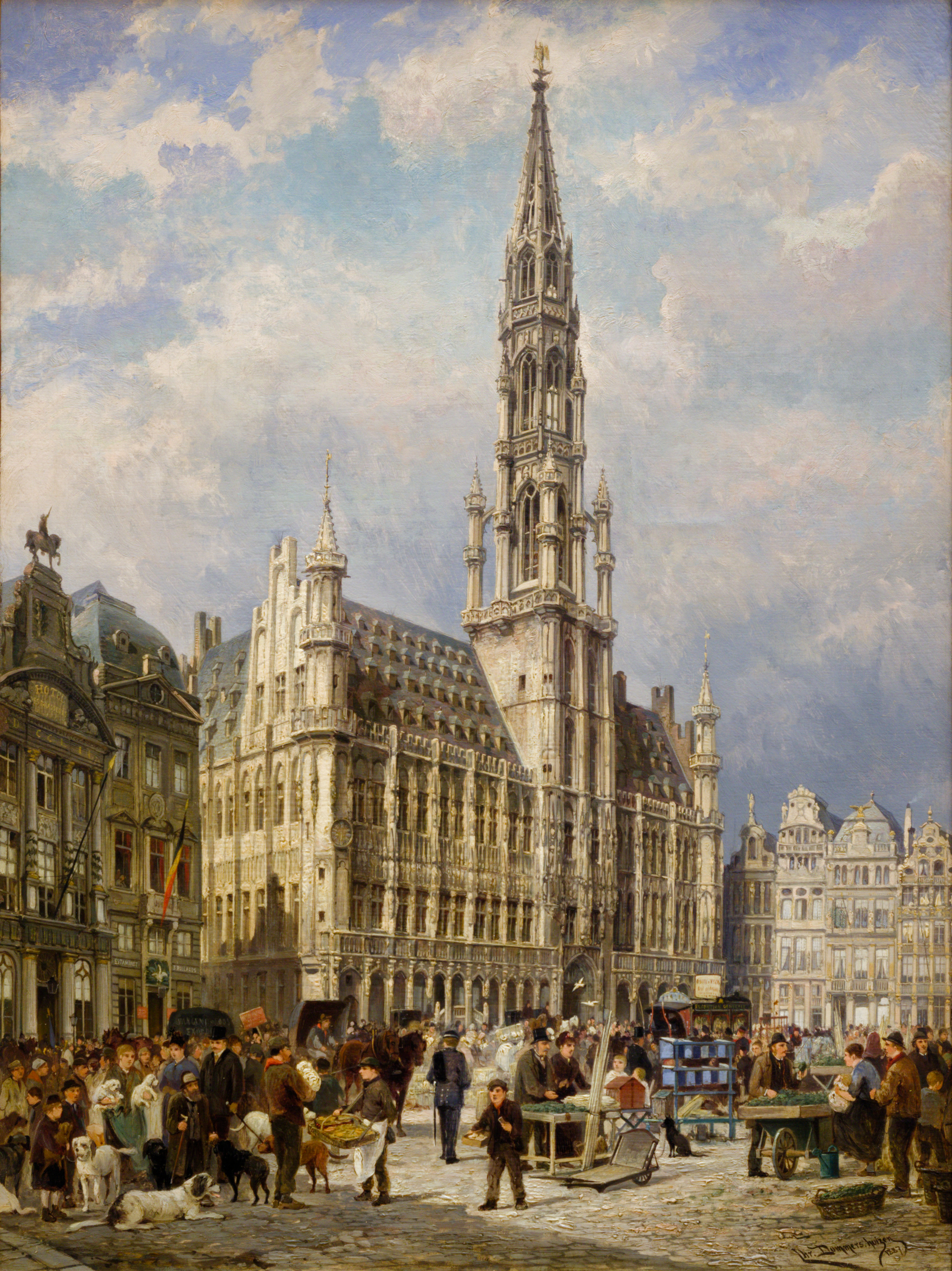
Brussels' Town Hall and the Sunday market, Cornelis Christiaan Dommersen, 1887

== See also ==
- List of museums in Brussels
- History of Brussels
- Culture of Belgium
- Belgium in the long nineteenth century
