= Gielis Panhedel =

- Born: Brussels

Gielis Panhedel or Gielis van den Bossche (c.1490 - after 1545) was a Flemish renaissance painter.

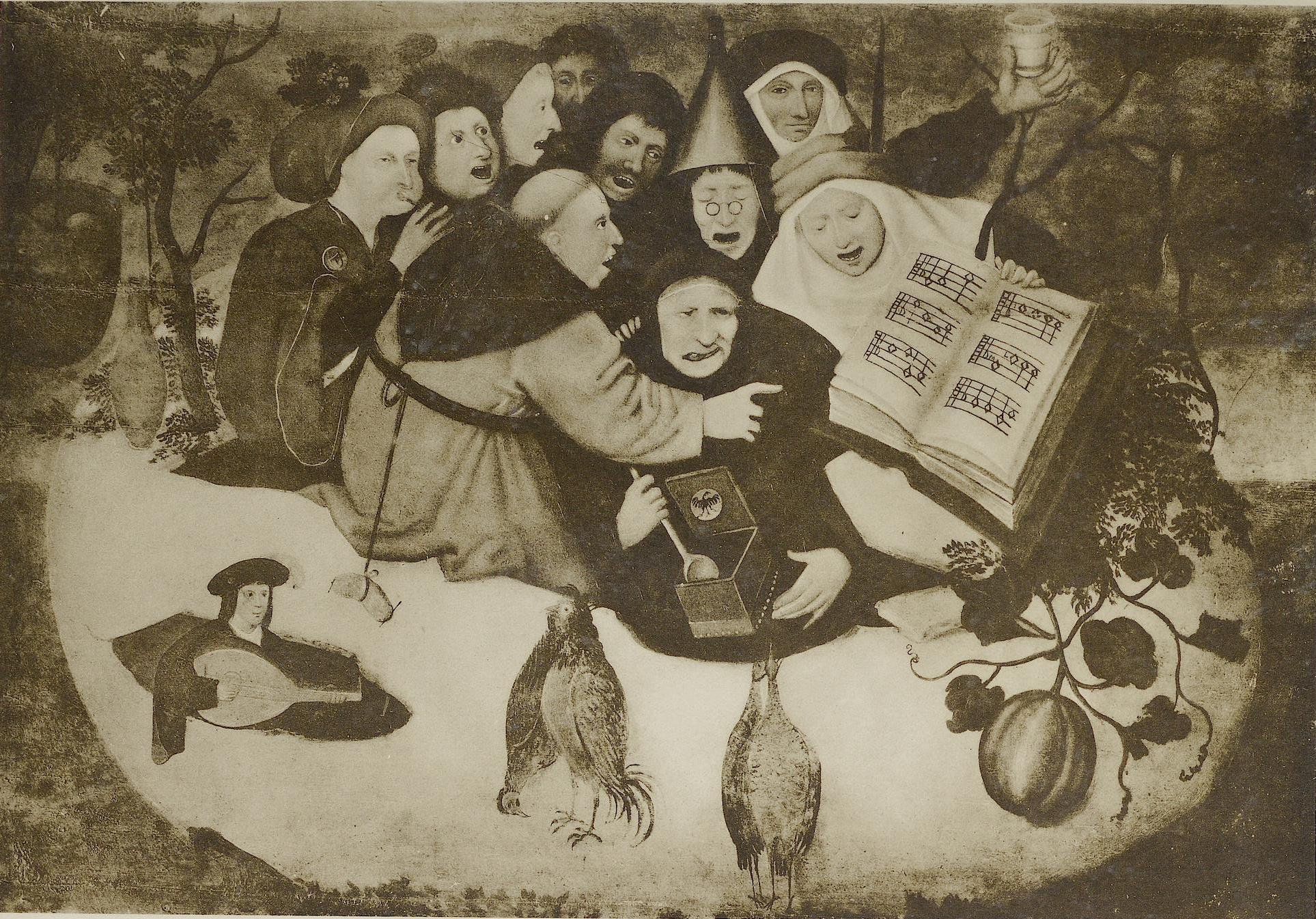
Concert in the Egg, before 1561

He is considered a follower of Jheronimus Bosch but little is known of his life. Panhedel was born in Brussels as the son of Aert van den Bossche (considered the man behind Master of the legend of St. Barbara). His father became a member of the Bruges Guild of St. Luke in 1505 as 'Harnoult van den Boske' with a son named 'Gilken van den Booeske'. During the years 1521-1523 he was mentioned in the archives of the Lieve-Vrouwe-Broederschap in 's-Hertogenbosch for working on doors of the same Maria reredos that Jheronimus Bosch had worked on before him. Later he was mentioned again in 1545/46 as 'Gielis van den Bossche tot Bruessel woenende' (living in Brussels).
