= Concert in the Egg =

Painting by a follower of Hieronymus Bosch

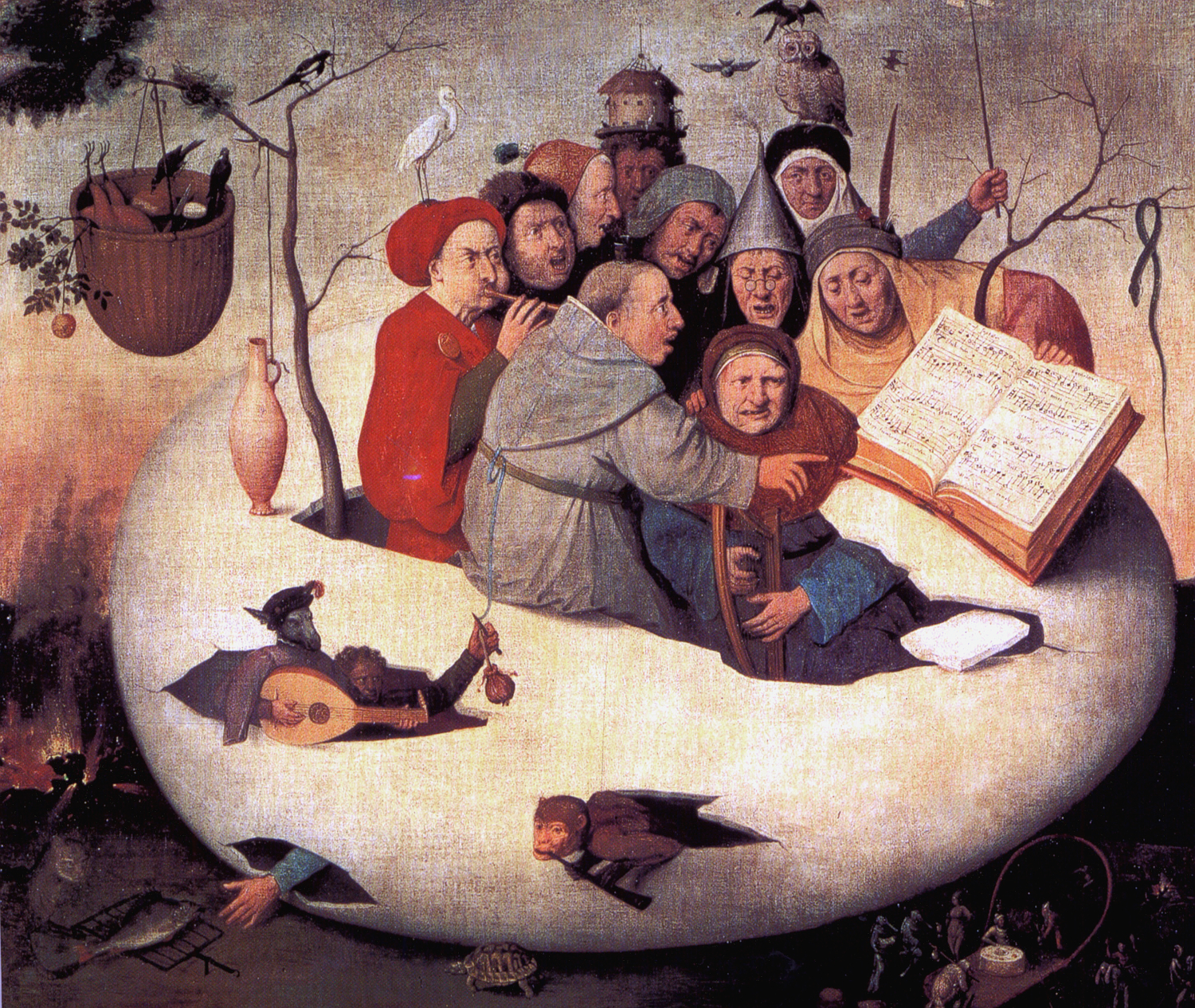
- Artist: (follower of) Hieronymus Bosch
- Year: c. 1561
- Medium: oil on canvas
- Dimensions: 108 cm × 126.5 cm (43 in × 49.8 in)
- Location: Palais des Beaux-Arts de Lille

Concert in the Egg is a painting formerly considered to be a copy of a lost work by Hieronymus Bosch, and which is currently considered to be based on one of his drawings. Max Jakob Friedländer called it 'an old copy', without specifying another work it was copied from.

== Symbolism ==
The group of singers form the "yolk" of the egg. The eel resembles a form of beer (ale). The scene is reminiscent of the similar Ship of Fools. One of the singers is so intent on his song (pointing towards the book) that he fails to notice that he is being robbed by the lute player.

Modern attribution of the painting (to an as yet anonymous follower of Bosch) was based on an analysis of the music in the open book, which shows notes of the chanson Toutes les nuictz by Thomas Crecquillon from 1549. The work was bought in 1890 for 400 francs by the Palais des Beaux-Arts de Lille from Morhange, a Parisian art dealer. It was featured with the Dutch title Zangers en musici in een ei in an exhibition in 2008 at the Noordbrabants Museum, 's-Hertogenbosch.

Possible models:

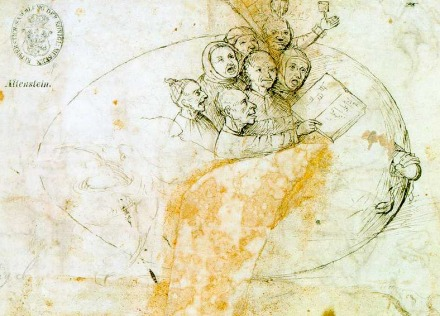
Singers in an egg by Hieronymus Bosch, 1465–1516

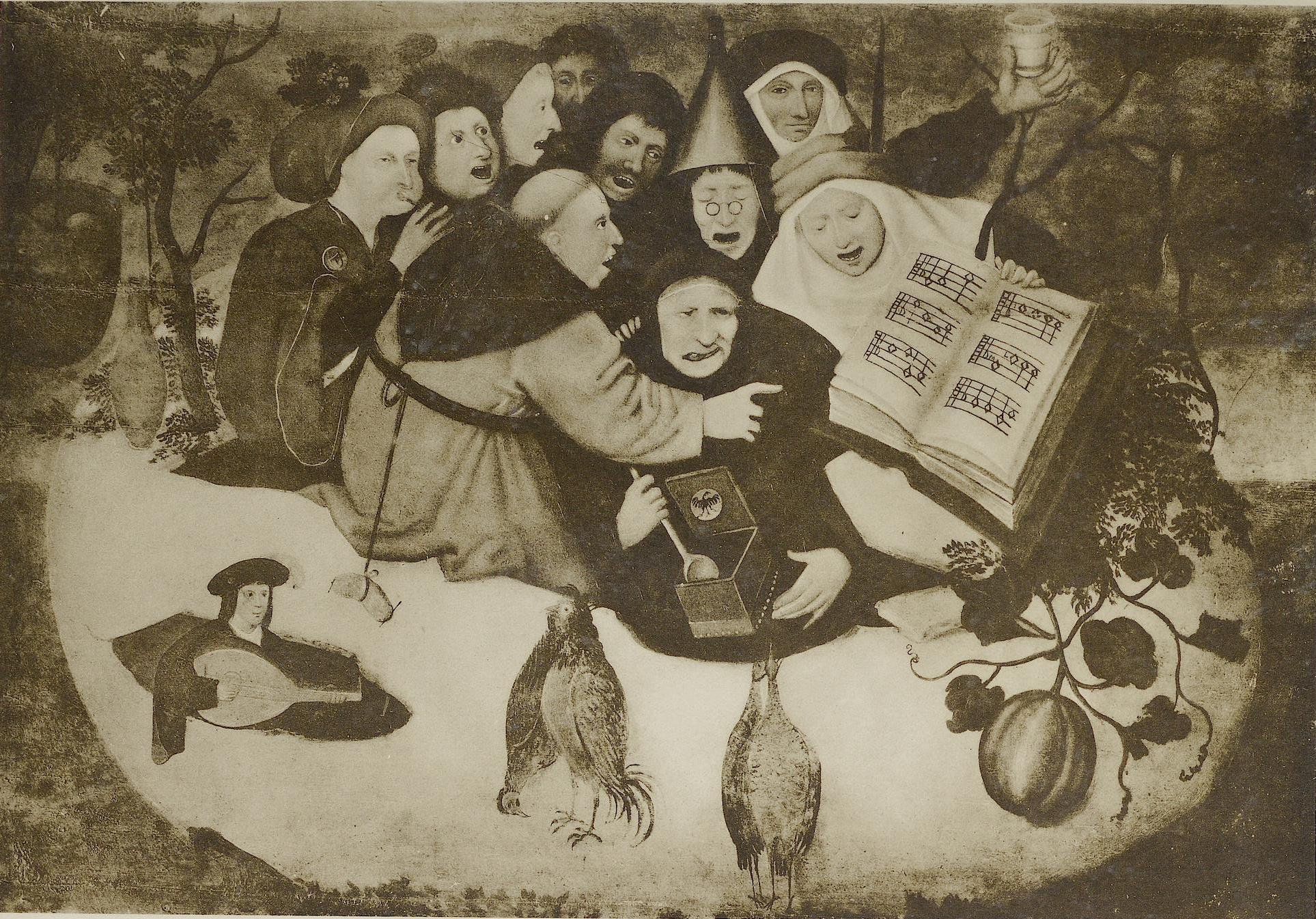
Precursor attributed to Gielis Panhedel, before 1561
