= Master of the Legend of Saint Catherine =

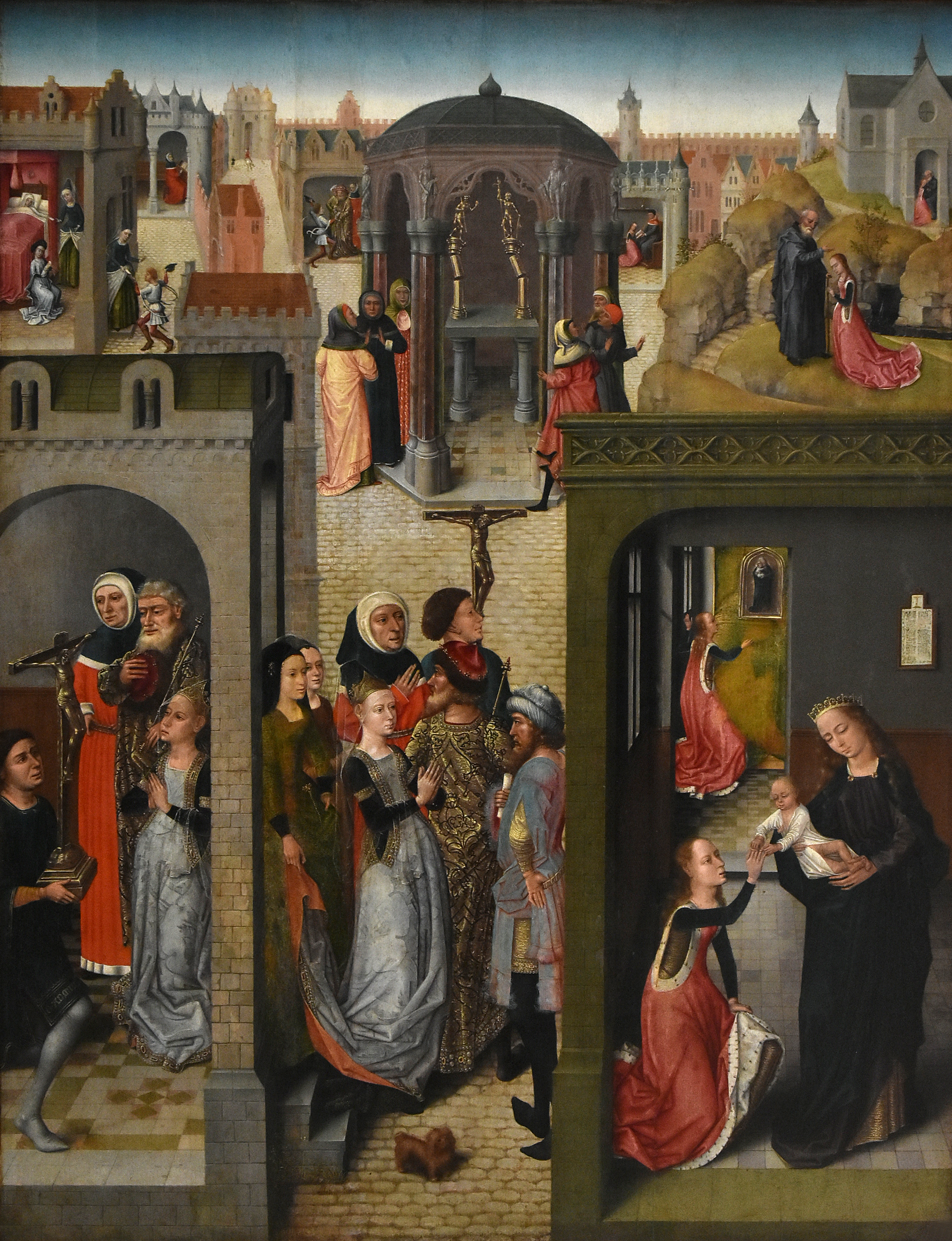
Scenes from the Legend of Saint Catherine, the painting that gave this master his Notname. Now in the Royal Museums of Fine Arts of Belgium

The Master of the Legend of Saint Catherine (or the Master of the Saint Catherine Legend) is the notname for an unknown late 15th century Early Netherlandish painter. He was named after a painting with Scenes from the Legend of Saint Catherine, now kept in the Royal Museums of Fine Arts of Belgium. He was active between c. 1470 and c. 1500, probably around Brussels.

== Identification ==
In the 19th century, his works, like many Early Netherlandish paintings, were attributed to Jan van Eyck or Hans Memling. At the 1902 Exposition des primitifs flamands à Bruges, the Mass of Saint Gregory panels (now in the Metropolitan Museum) were attributed to an unknown follower of Rogier van der Weyden, placing the artist more in the Brussels' school of artists than the earlier attributions. Multiple works were first attributed to this artist by Max Jacob Friedländer.

It has been speculated that the Master may be the Brussels master Pieter van der Weyden, son of Rogier van der Weyden. No works by Pieter van der Weyden are known, even though he was clearly an important painter in Brussels in the late 15th century.

== Works ==
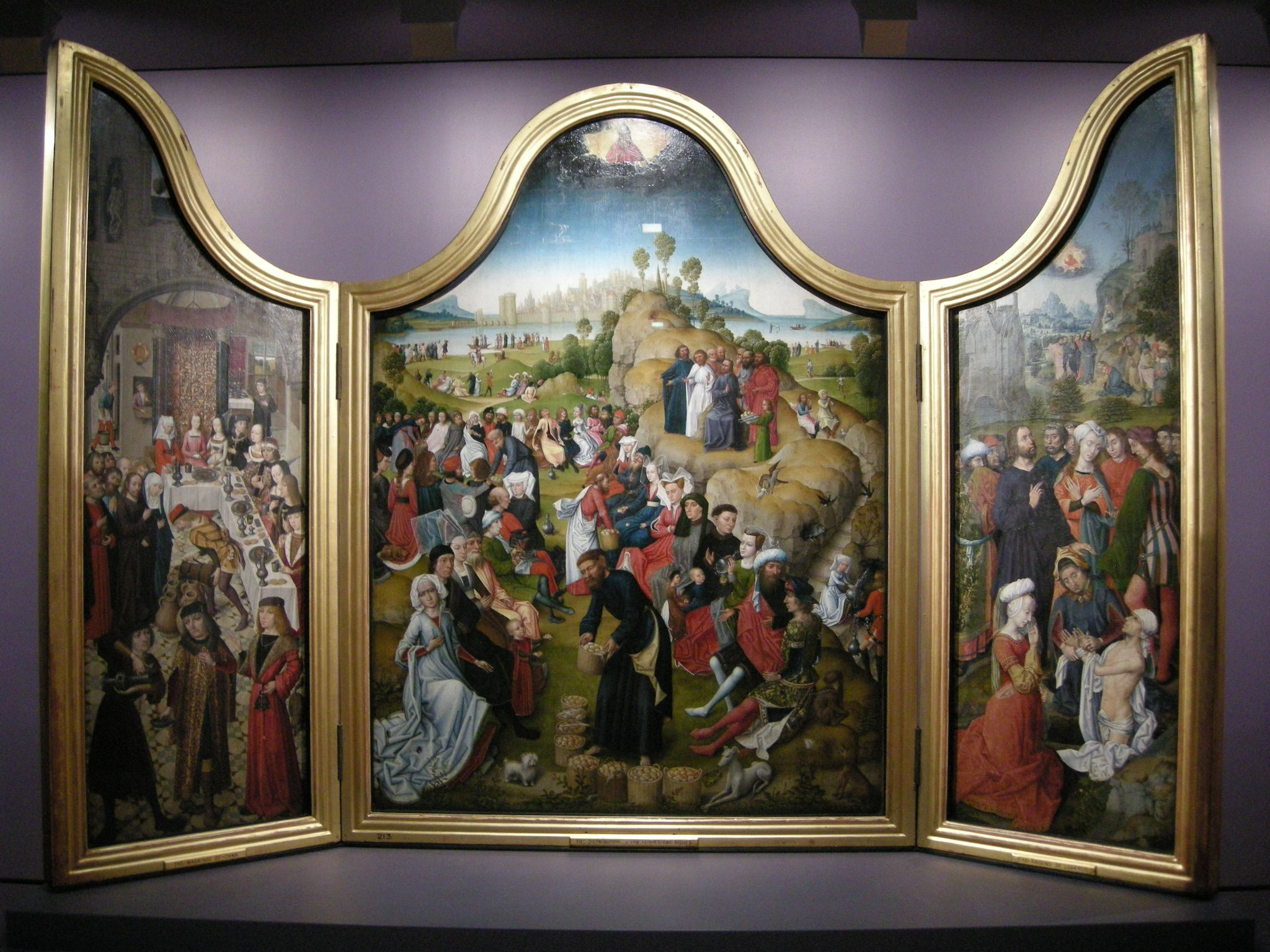
Triptych of the Miracles of Christ, workshop of the Master of the Legend of Saint Catherine, now in the National Gallery of Victoria

- Scenes from the Legend of Saint Catherine, now in the Royal Museums of Fine Arts of Belgium
- Three panels with Saint Michael, The Mass of Saint Gregory, and Saint Jerome, now in the Metropolitan Museum of Art; the panel with the Mass of Gregory is known from other version as well, especially one in the Royal Chapel of Granada
- Saint Blasius and Saint Catherine, sold at Sotheby's in 2000 for $167,500
- Virgin and Child Crowned by an Angel, sold at Sotheby's in 2001 for $445,750; according to Friedländer, the floor pattern is identical to one used by Rogier van der Weyden
- Adoration of the Magi, after Rogier van der Weyden, sold in Amsterdam in 1951
- The flagellation of Christ, sold in Luzern in 1945
- The Crucifixion, after Rogier van der Weyden, now in the Museo del Prado
- The Marriage of the Virgin, now in the Museo del Prado
- Descent from the cross, after Rogier van der Weyden, now in the Royal Collection
- Virgin and Child with two Angels playing Music, current location unknown
- Maria and Christ on a Throne, current location unknown
- Holy Trinity with two Angels, current location unknown
- Triptych of the Last Supper, c. 1475-1485, now in the Grootseminarie of Bruges
- Virgin and Child with Saint Anne, now in the Suermondt-Ludwig Museum
- Christ gives Saint Peter the Keys to Heaven (triptych, c. 1490), now in the Wallraf-Richartz Museum, is attributed to this Master and the Master of the Legend of Saint Barbara together, sometimes with Aert Van den Bossche as well
- Altarpiece of Henry II, now in the Westphalian State Museum of Art and Cultural History, is attributed to this Master and the Master of the Legend of Saint Barbara together
- Nativity, c. 1491-1500, now in the Royal Museums of Fine Arts of Belgium
- Virgin and Child between Saint Barbara and Saint Catherine, central panel of a triptych with also a Maas of Gregory, now in the Royal Chapel of Granada
- Christ disputing with the doctors, now in the National Museums Northern Ireland

=== Possible ===
- Portrait of Hugo de Groot, now in the Ackland Art Museum, has been attributed to either this Master, the Master of the Virgo inter Virgines or Simon Marmion
- The Crucifixion, now in the Academy of Fine Arts Vienna
- The Crucifixion (triptych), after Rogier van der Weyden, now in the Wallraf-Richartz Museum; by this master or attributed to the school of Rogier van der Weyden
- Portrait of Philip of Cleves, Lord of Ravenstein, c. 1492-1495, now in the Royal Museums of Fine Arts of Belgium
- Triptych of the Virgin and Child between Angels, Saint Catherine and Saint Agnes, alternatively attributed to a follower of Hans Memling, now in the Musée du Berry
- Adoration of the Magi, now in the Heiligkreuzkirche in Binningen, Switzerland
- Virgin and Child with an Angel, now in Upton House, Warwickshire
- Saint Blasius and Saint Catherine, sold at Sotheby's in 2000 for $167,500; also attributed to Aert Van den Bossche

=== Workshop, circle, after... ===
Works which have been said to be by the workshop of the Master, or in his circle, or otherwise related to his work and style, include:

- Triptych of the Miracles of Christ, attributed to the workshop of the Master, now in the National Gallery of Victoria
- Last Supper, c. 1490-1500, sold at Christian Delorme in Paris in 1995
- Descent from the Cross, by Marcellus Coffermans after the Master, third quarter of the 16th century
- Triptych of the Crucifixion, by an anonymous painter after the Master, first half of the 16th century
- The angel visits Elijah, after the Master, sold at Sotheby's in 1998 for fl. 30,000

=== Rejected attributions ===
- Virgin and Child in a Landscape, originally indicated by Max Jakob Friedländer as possibly by the Master, now considered as the work of an anonymous painter after Rogier van der Weyden; now in the Museum Boijmans Van Beuningen
- The meal at Emmaüs, attributed to the Master at auction in 2000, but now rejected and attributed to an anonymous painter
- The Annunciation, in 1927 attributed to the Master, now recognised as a 20th-century pastiche by Jef Van der Veken after Rogier van der Weyden
- Raising of Lazarus, now considered a work by Vrancke van der Stockt
- Saint Helena finds the True Cross, now considered a work by Vrancke van der Stockt
- Still life with Books and a Basin, now in the Museum Boijmans Van Beuningen
- Nativity, now attributed to the Master of San Ildefonso, in the Detroit Institute of Arts
- Salomo and the Queen of Sheba, now attributed to the Master of the Portraits of Princes, in the Bargello
