= King's House, Brussels =

Historic building and UNESCO World Heritage Site in Brussels, Belgium

King's House
- Maison du Roi (French); Broodhuis (Dutch)
- King's House's main façade seen from the Grand-Place/Grote Markt
- Alternative names: Bread House

General information
- Architectural style: Gothic Revival
- Location: Grand-Place/Grote Markt, 1000 City of Brussels, Brussels-Capital Region, Belgium
- Coordinates: 50°50′49″N 4°21′10″E
- Construction started: 1504
- Completed: 1536
- Renovated: 1874–1896

Design and construction
- Architects: Antoon II Keldermans, Louis van Bodeghem, Hendrik van Pede

Renovating team
- Architect: Victor Jamaer

UNESCO World Heritage Site
- Part of: La Grand-Place, Brussels
- Criteria: Cultural: ii, iv
- Reference: 857
- Inscription: 1998 (22nd Session)

The King's House (French: Maison du Roi) or Bread House (Dutch: Broodhuis) is a historic building in Brussels, Belgium, housing the Brussels City Museum. It is located on the north side of the Grand-Place/Grote Markt (Brussels' main square), opposite the Town Hall.

Erected between 1504 and 1536 on the site of a former bread market, the King's House was rebuilt in the 19th century in its current neo-Gothic style by the architect Victor Jamaer. Since 1998, it has also been listed as a UNESCO World Heritage Site, as part of the square.

== Toponymy ==
The building was first called the Duke's House (Middle Dutch: 's Hertogenhuys), but when Charles V, Duke of Brabant since 1506, was crowned King of Spain in 1516, it became known as the King's House (Middle Dutch: 's Conincxhuys). It is currently known as the Maison du Roi ("King's House") in French, although no king has ever lived there, though in Dutch it continues to be called the Broodhuis ("Bread House"), after the market whose place it took (see below).

== History ==
=== Original bread market ===
The building was originally constructed as a bread market, with the earliest structure likely dating back to the early 13th century. The first mention of its existence is from 1321, when it formed part of a complex of three covered markets—a meat market, a bread market, and a cloth market—together forming a quadrangle on the northern edge of the Grand-Place/Grote Markt. This wooden bread hall was replaced by a stone building in 1405. Despite their early significance, little is known about these original buildings.

The bakers gradually abandoned the market hall to sell door-to-door, although the leaders of their trade retained a meeting place there until the first quarter of the 15th century. During the 14th and 15th centuries, it was chosen to house various administrative services of the Duchy of Brabant: the offices of the Receiver General of the Domain, the toll chamber, and the forestry court.

=== Gothic building ===
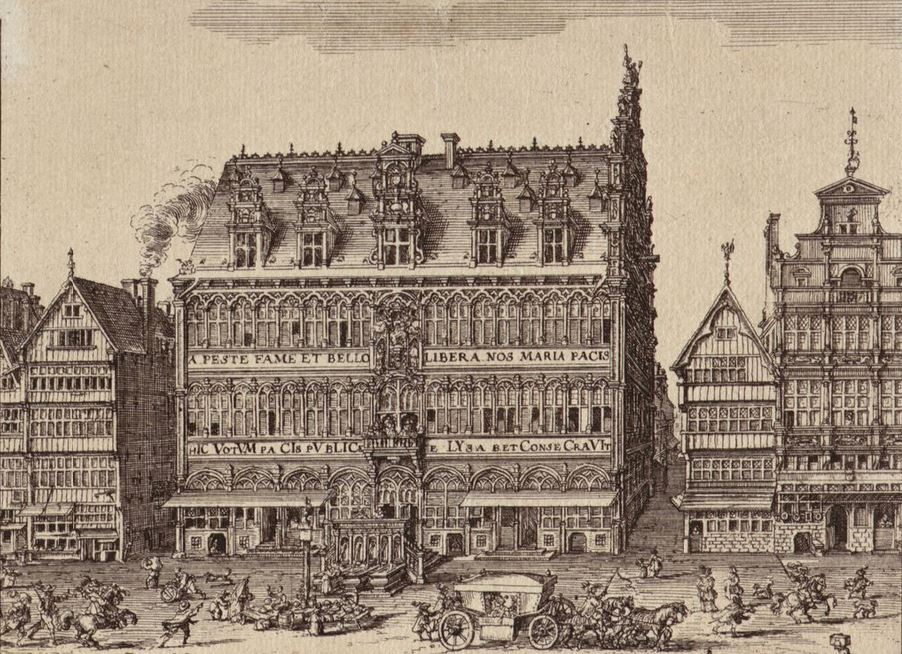
The Gothic King's House, designed by Antoon II Keldermans in 1514

The ageing building underwent several repairs and alterations. Despite this, it did not withstand the ravages of time. In 1504, it was decided to rebuild it on the site of the first cloth and bread markets, which were no longer in use. The court architect Antoon II Keldermans was entrusted with drawing up the plans, in a late Gothic style very similar to the contemporary design, although without towers or galleries. The old building was not demolished until 1512–13, and construction took place between 1515 and 1536. Following Keldermans' death in 1516, the architect Louis van Bodeghem took over the work. As he was occupied with other tasks, the project's completion was entrusted to Hendrik van Pede. Due to the ground's marshy nature, the structure was built on stilts connected by cattle hides.

This late Gothic building was never completed; depictions from the early 17th century show that the left gable, as well as the planned double gallery and central tower, remained unbuilt. In 1565–66, a large fountain with three basins was placed against the entrance steps. In 1568, two statesmen, Lamoral, Count of Egmont and Philip de Montmorency, Count of Horn, who had spoken out against the policies of King Philip II in the Spanish Netherlands, were beheaded in front of the King's House. This triggered the beginning of the armed revolt against Spanish rule, of which William of Orange took the lead.

In 1625, Archduchess Isabella had a stone statue of the Virgin Mary, flanked by two statues of saints, placed on the façade in honour of Our Lady of Basse-Wavre, along with the Latin inscription A peste fame et bello libera nos Maria Pacis ("From plague, famine and war, deliver us, Mary of Peace"), and the chronogram hIC VotUM paCIs pUbLICæ eLIsabeth ConseCraVIt ("Here Elizabeth consecrated the vow of public peace", and the year 1625).

=== Destruction and rebuilding ===
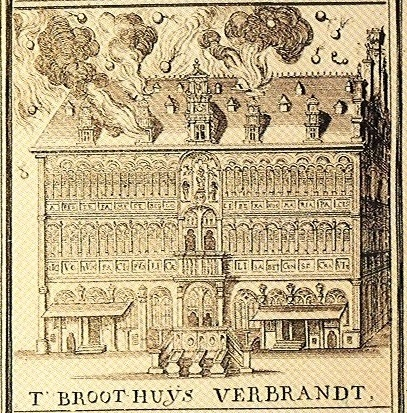
The King's House burning during the bombardment of Brussels in 1695

The King's House suffered extensive damage in 1695 from the bombardment of Brussels by a French army under Marshal François de Neufville, duc de Villeroy. The building was then crudely restored by the architect Jan Cosijn in 1697. A second, more thorough restoration followed in 1767, when it received a neoclassical-style portal and a large roof pierced with three oeil-de-boeuf windows. The statues of saints accompanying the Virgin Mary were replaced by those of an imperial eagle and a heraldic lion. This also led to the disappearance of the fountain from the portal.

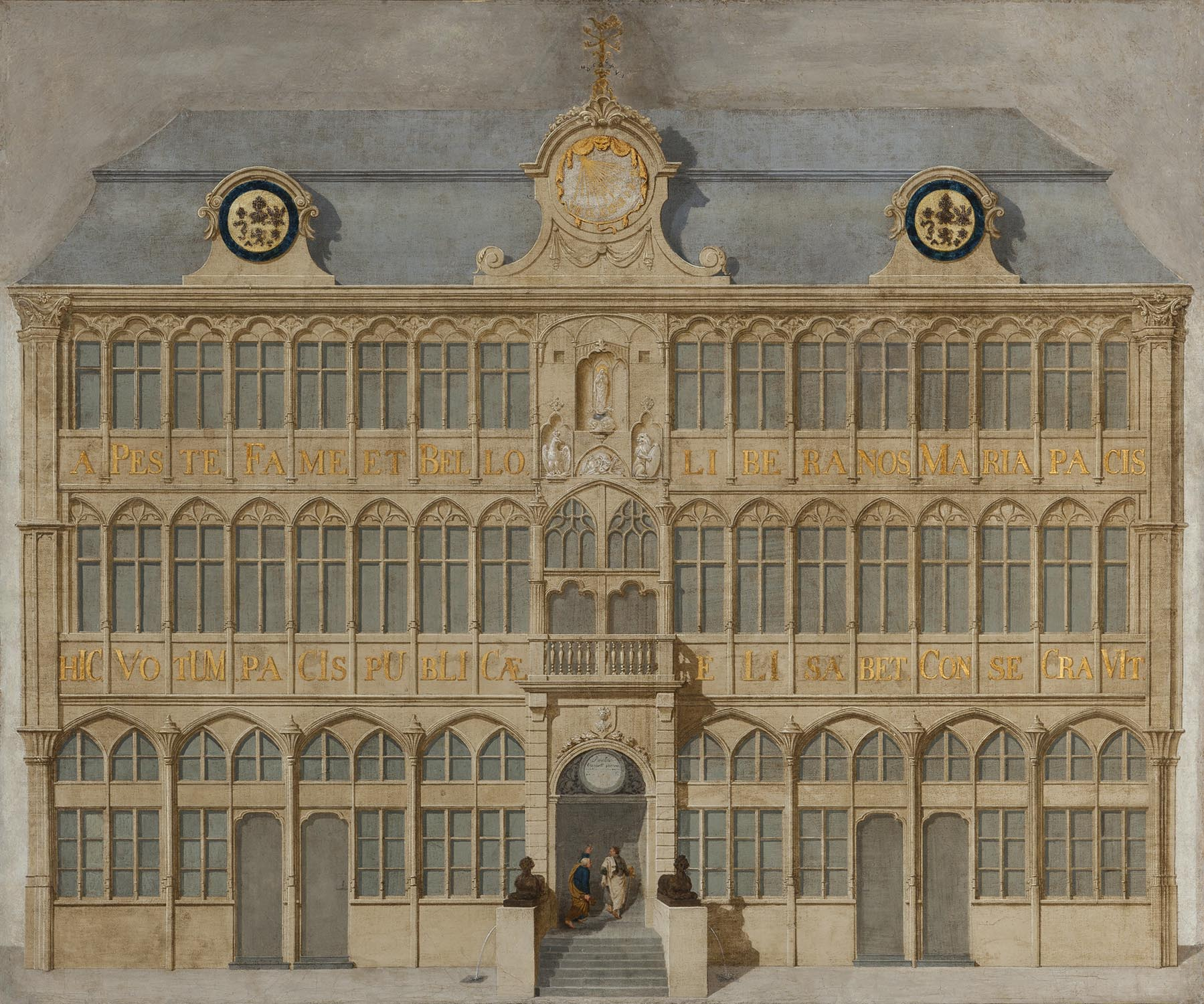
The building c. 1812, following the neoclassical restoration

In the late 18th century, during the occupation of Brussels by French Revolutionaries, the building served as a Maison du Peuple/Volkshuis ("House of the People"). Having become national property, it was ceded to the City of Brussels, which sold it in 1811 to the Marquis Paul Arconati-Visconti. The latter did not keep it long; he resold it in 1817. The new owner rented it for the most diverse uses: from a tax office, to a courthouse, a temporary prison, a horse feed storage space for the British cavalry after the Battle of Waterloo, a rehearsal room for the Theatre of La Monnaie's ballet school, and a library.

In 1860, the City of Brussels bought back the building, along with three houses facing the rear on the Rue du Poivre/Peperstraat. In 1864, a new fountain made by the sculptor Charles-Auguste Fraikin was installed, topped with statues of the Counts of Egmont and Horn, on the site of their execution.

=== Neo-Gothic building ===
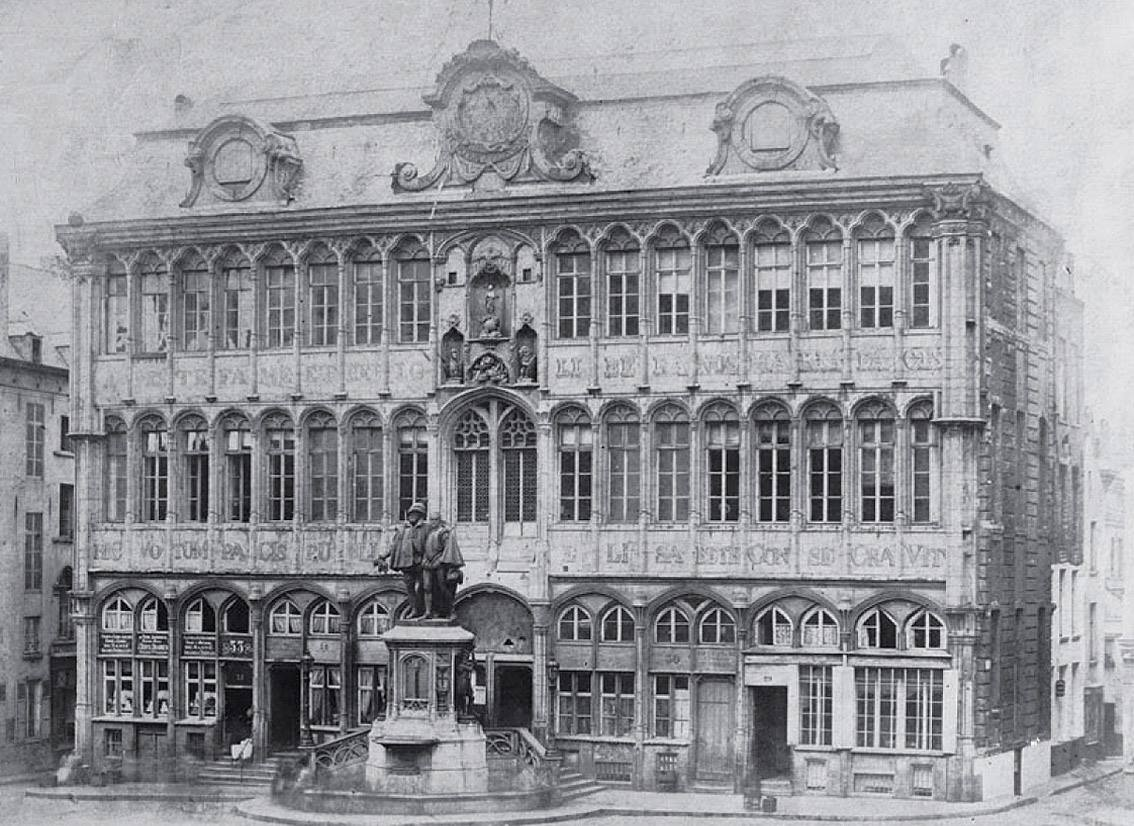
The building c. 1873, before the neo-Gothic reconstruction campaign

By the mid-19th century, the state of the building had deteriorated and a comprehensive renovation was sorely needed. Under the impulse of the city's then-mayor, Charles Buls, it was reconstructed once again between 1874 and 1896, in its current neo-Gothic form, by the architect Victor Jamaer, in the style of his mentor, Eugène Viollet-le-Duc. On that occasion, Jamaer built two galleries and a central tower crowned with a bulbous roof. He also adorned the façade with statues and other decorations. At the rear, he added a new, much more sober wing in neo-Flemish Renaissance style. The new King's House was officially inaugurated in 1896.

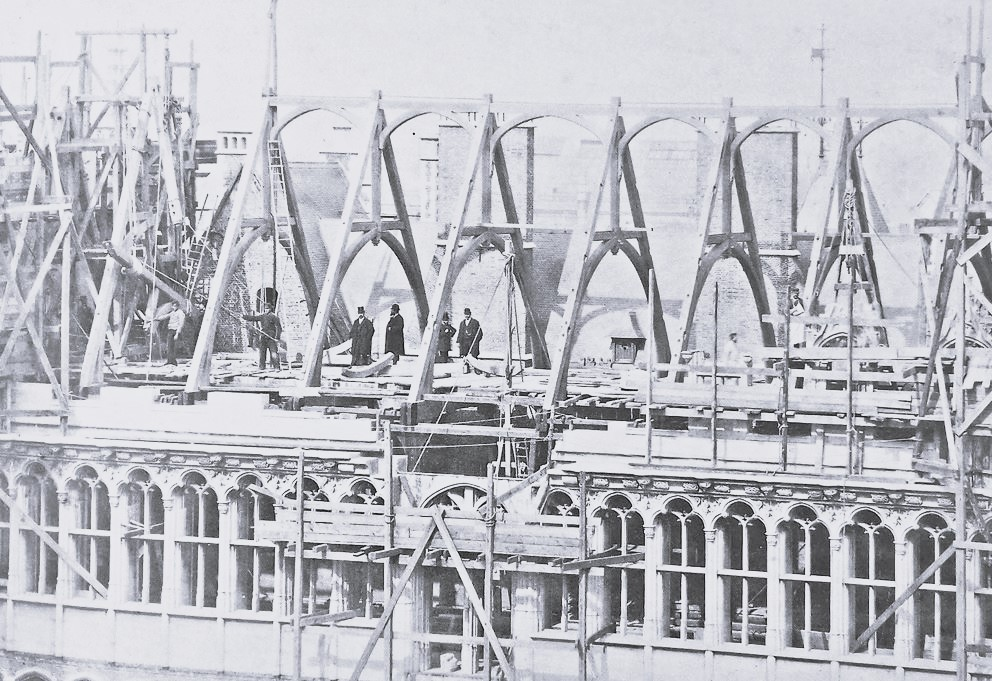
Construction of the current building, c. 1880

During the works, the fountain-sculpture of the Counts of Egmont and Horn was moved to the Square du Petit Sablon/Kleine Zavelsquare, where it now stands with its back to the Egmont Palace. Despite the fountain's relocation, the memory of the martyrs remains present at the site of their execution through commemorative plaques in French and Dutch, which have hung on either side of the building's entrance since 1911, replacing a previous plaque written only in French and sealed in the pavement.

The current building, whose interior was renovated in 1985, has housed the Brussels City Museum since 1887. From 1928, the entire building was assigned to the museum's collections. After transformations, it reopened its doors in 1935 on the occasion of the Brussels International Exposition. On 9 March 1936, it was designated a historic monument, at the same time as the Town Hall. It has been a UNESCO World Heritage Site since 1998, as part of the Grand-Place's registration.

== Description ==
=== Exterior ===
The main building faces the Grand-Place and is extended at the rear by two oblique wings running along the Rue des Harengs/Haringstraat to the east and the Rue Chair et Pain/Vlees-en-Broodstraat to the west. Between these stands a long, narrow building, concealed from view on the Rue du Poivre/Peperstraat side by a boundary wall.

The main building is neo-Gothic, constructed from brick, blue stone, and Gobertange stone. It spans three storeys and is topped by a vast gabled and hipped slate roof, pierced by numerous dormers, and dotted with statues of standard-bearers. At the centre of the façade stands the building's tower with its delicate tracery, square plan, and octagonal top, culminating in a domed slate spire. The first two floors feature a portico with a loggia, adorned with intricate late-Gothic relief decorations. The two side façades are also richly decorated, surmounted by highly elaborate pediments ending in spires and statues.

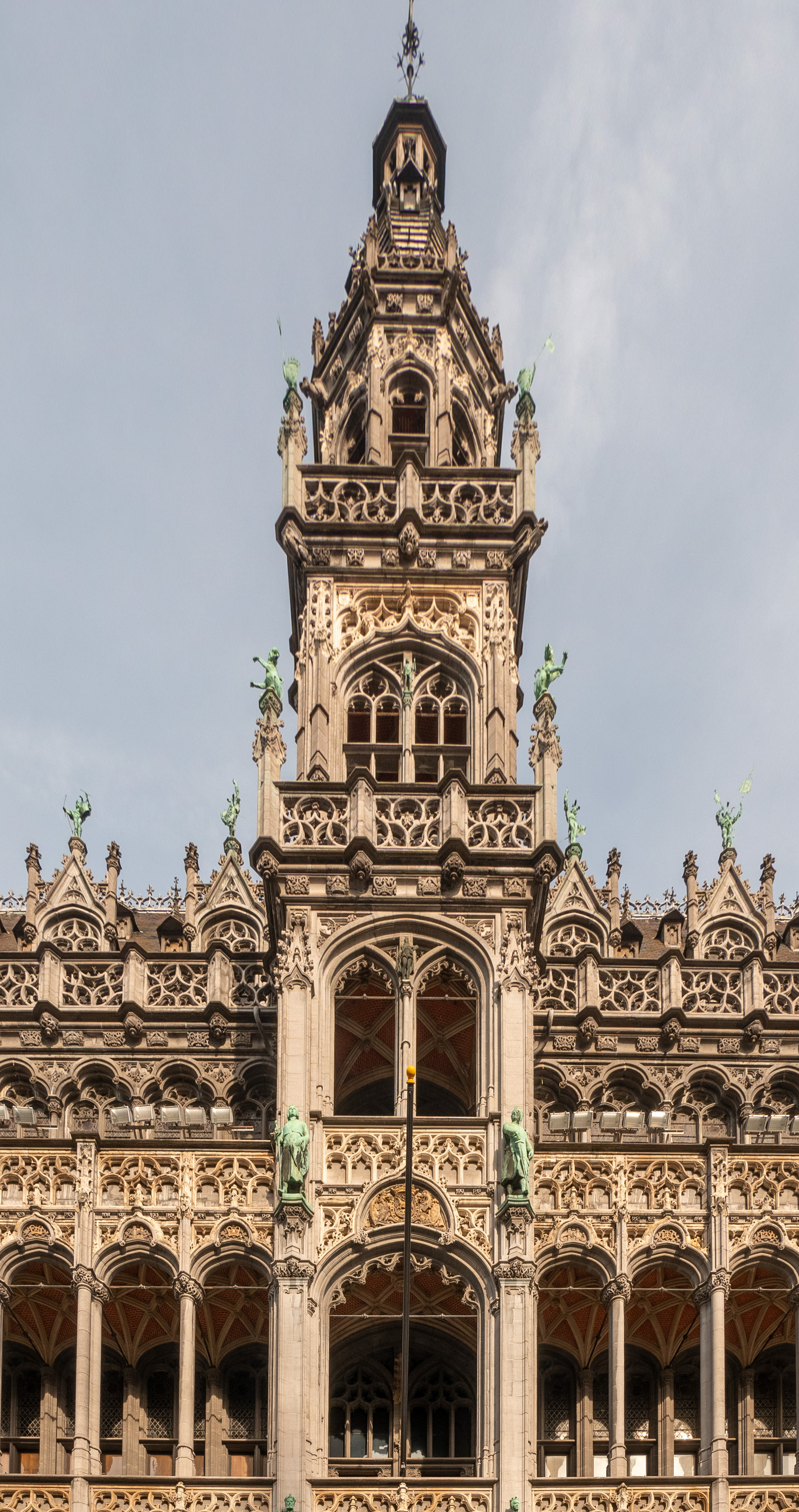
Central tower

Closeup of the roof

Detail of the central tower and window

Statues of Charles V and Isabella of Portugal above the entrance

=== Interior ===
Inside, the cellar level has been restored with groin vaults, pillars, and side corbels. On the ground floor, at the far end of the entrance hall, a Louis XVI-style framed bay window in reused blue stone is visible; a marble plaque commemorates the reconstruction; four rooms have been rebuilt identically with white stone-ribbed brick vaults, supported by a central white stone column with an octagonal base and capital, and by wall corbels. In the oblique wings to the east, there is a stuccoed and painted neoclassical ceiling and a marble fireplace; to the west, a wooden ceiling on carved corbels, and a neo-Gothic fireplace. On the first floor, a large exhibition hall features an oak floor and a beamed ceiling supported by carved corbels. The second floor has an exposed neo-Gothic timber roof truss.

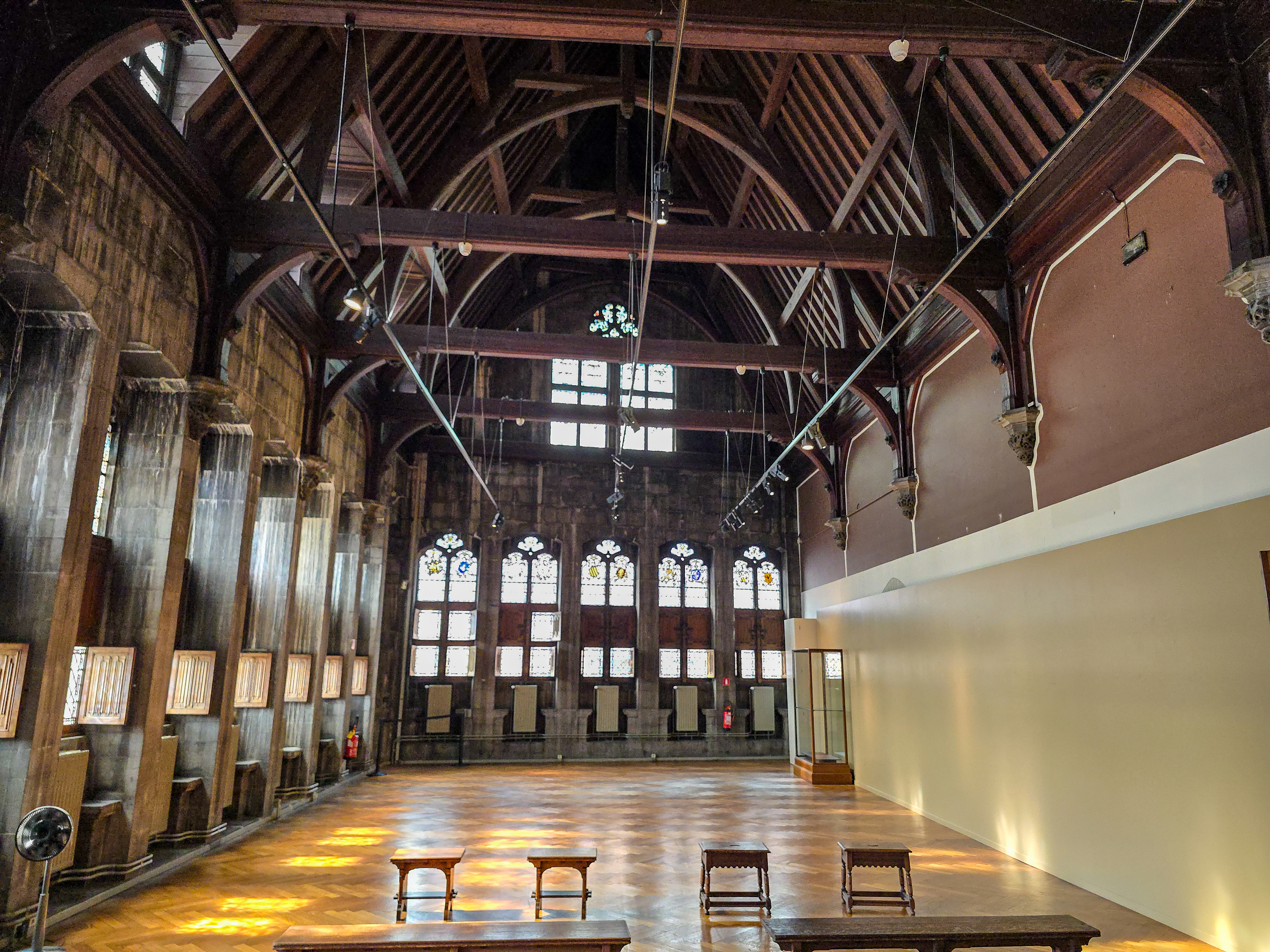
Inside view

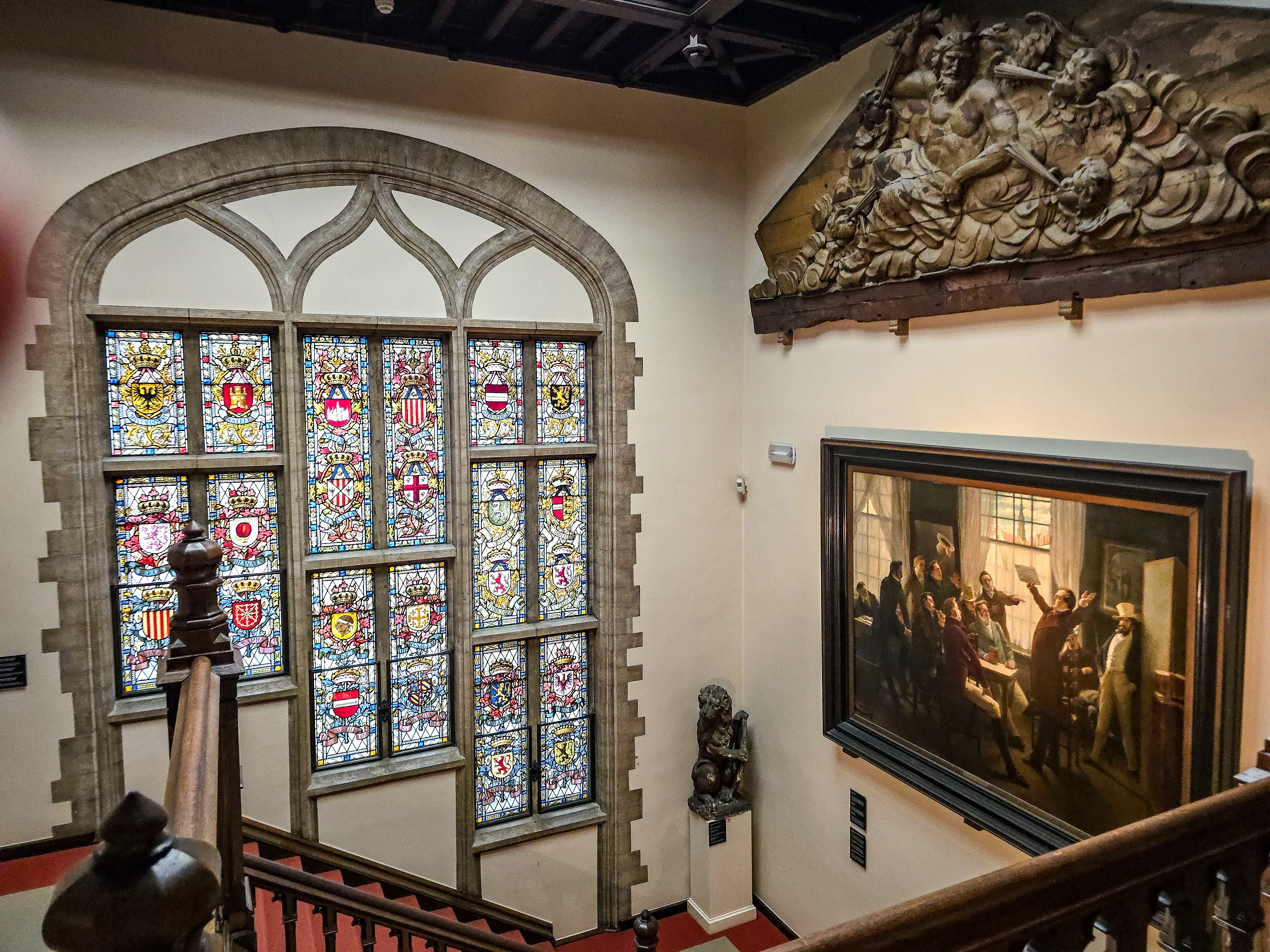
Stained glass above the staircase

== See also ==
- History of Brussels
- Culture of Belgium
- Belgium in the long nineteenth century
