= Ten thousand martyrs =

Legendary group of Christian martyrs

Saints 10,000 Martyrs of Mount Ararat
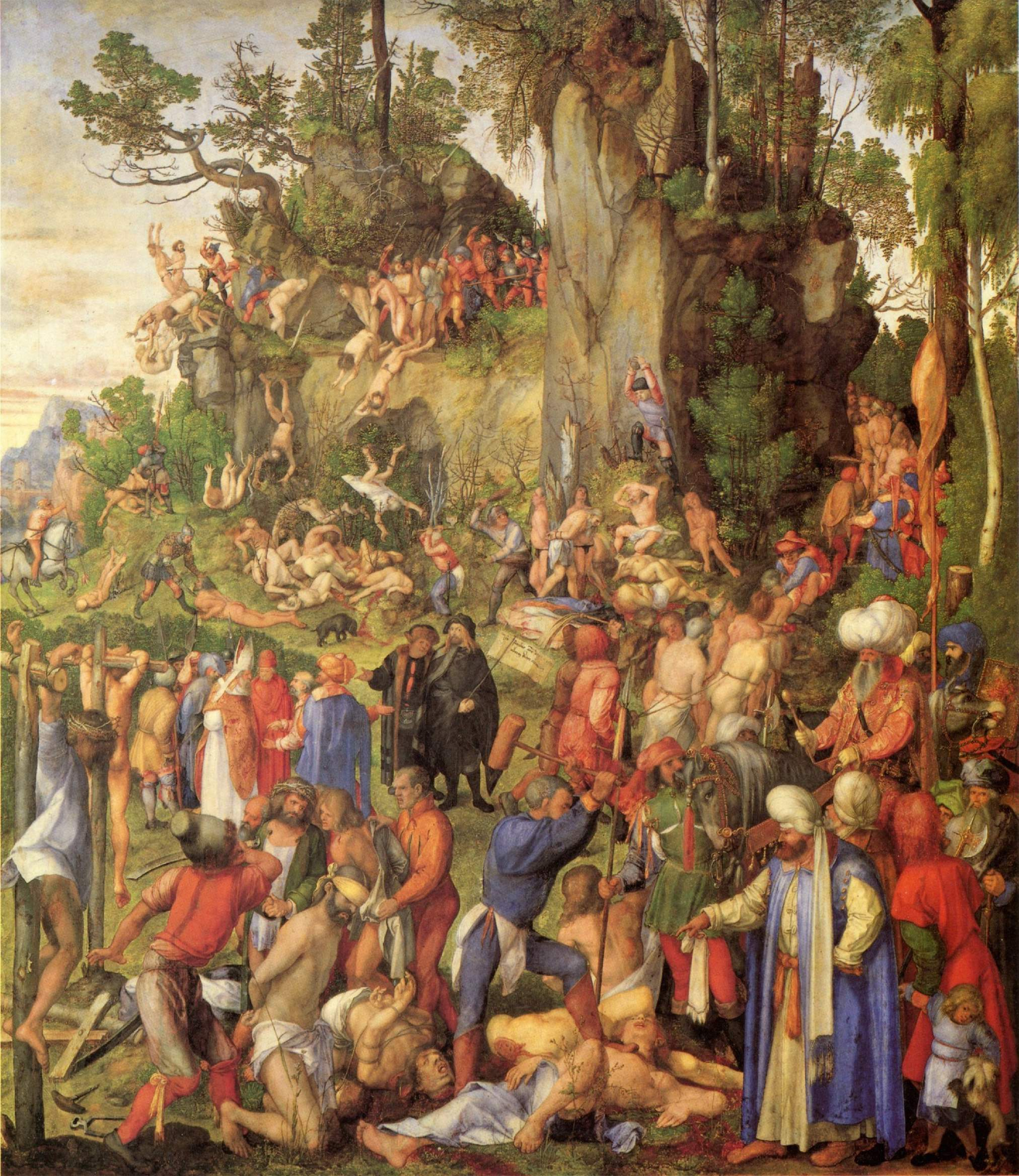
- Martyrdom of the Ten Thousand painted by Albrecht Dürer.

Martyrs
- Died: c. 2nd century Mount Ararat, Turkey
- Venerated in: Catholic Church; Eastern Orthodoxy; Oriental Orthodoxy; Lutheran Church; Anglican Church
- Canonized: Pre-Congregation
- Feast: 22 June
- Attributes: Crown of martyrdom Martyr's palm
- Patronage: Persecuted Christians

Ten thousand martyrs may refer to the ten thousand martyred Fathers in the Deserts and caves of Scete by Theophilus of Alexandria or to the ten thousand martyrs of Mount Ararat who were, according to a medieval legend, Roman soldiers who, led by Saint Acacius, converted to Christianity and were crucified on Mount Ararat by order of the Roman emperor. The story is attributed to the ninth century scholar Anastasius Bibliothecarius.

The Roman Martyrology contains two separate commemorations. The first is on March 18, (Note: "At Nicomedia, ten thousand holy martyrs, who were put to the sword for the confession of Christ.") corresponding to the very same date in the Greek Orthodox Synaxarion, where it is referred to as the "Myriads of Holy Martyrs, by the sword, at Nicomedia". Francis Mershman identifies these as those 20,000 Martyrs of Nicomedia killed during the Diocletianic Persecution.

The second entry in the Roman Martyrology is for June 22 on Mount Ararat; (Note: "On Mount Ararat, the martyrdom of ten thousand holy martyrs, who were crucified.") however, this appears to be based on a legend containing "many historical inaccuracies and utterly improbable details". The Greek Orthodox Synaxarion also has a second entry which is listed on June 1, for "The Holy Ten Thousand Martyrs" in Antiochia, under Emperor Decius. However, it is unclear if this refers to the same event as the Roman Martyrology entry for June 22.

Despite its questionable veracity, the event was extremely popular in Renaissance art, as seen for example in the painting 10,000 martyrs of Mount Ararat by the Venetian artist Vittore Carpaccio, or in the Martyrdom of the Ten Thousand by the German artist Albrecht Dürer.
