= Alphonse Wauters =

Belgian archivist and historian

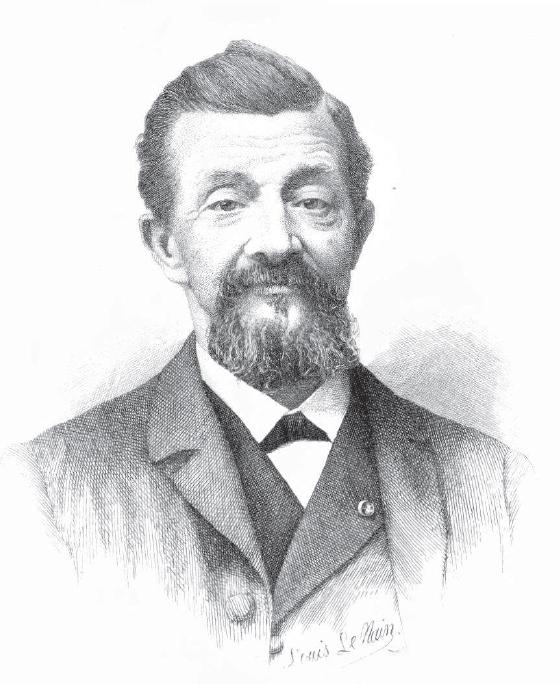
- Portrait from Academy obituary by Henri Pirenne
- Born: Alphonse Guillaume Ghislain Wauters; 13 April 1817; Brussels, United Kingdom of the Netherlands
- Died: 1 May 1898 (aged 81); Brussels, Belgium
- Occupations: archivist and historian
- Known for: Histoire de Bruxelles (3 vols., 1845); Histoire des environs de Bruxelles (10 vols., 1855)

Alphonse Wauters (1817–1898) was a Belgian archivist and historian.

== Life ==
Alphonse Guillaume Ghislain Wauters was born in Brussels on 13 April 1817. He was appointed archivist of the city of Brussels on 2 April 1842. He became a correspondent of the Royal Academy of Science, Letters and Fine Arts of Belgium in 1860, and a member in 1868. In January 1886, after the death of Louis Prosper Gachard, he became the academy's secretary-treasurer. He died in Brussels on 1 May 1898.

== Works ==
- Les Délices de la Belgique, ou Description historique, pittoresque et monumentale de ce royaume (Brussels and Leipzig, 1844)
- with Alexandre Henne, Histoire de Bruxelles (3 vols., Brussels, 1845)
- Notice historique sur la ville de Vilvorde, son ancien château, ses institutions civiles et religieuses, ouvrage composé d'après des documents pour la plupart inédits (Brussels, 1853)
- Histoire des environs de Bruxelles (10 vols., Brussels, 1855)
- Le Duc Jean I^{er} et le Brabant sous le règne de ce prince (1267-1294) (Brussels and Liège, 1862)
- Table chronologique des chartes et diplômes imprimés concernant l'histoire de la Belgique (10 vols., Brussels, 1866–1907), partly published posthumously, edited by Stanislas Bormans
- De l'Origine et des premiers développements des libertés communales en Belgique, dans le Nord de la France, etc. (Brussels, 1869)
- Henry III, duc de Brabant (Brussels, 1875)
- Un poète du dix-neuvième siècle, Adolphe Mathieu, notice biographique (Brussels, 1880)
- Documents concernant le canal de Bruxelles à Willebroeck, précédés d'une introduction contenant un résumé de l'histoire de ce canal (Brussels, 1882)
- Liste par ordre chronologique des magistrats communaux de Bruxelles depuis 1794 jusqu'en 1883 (Brussels, 1884)
- Inventaire des cartulaires et autres registres faisant partie des archives anciennes de la ville de Bruxelles (2 vols., Brussels, 1888–1894).
- with Camille Lemonnier, Le Palais de la ville de Bruxelles à l'Exposition universelle de 1897 (Brussels, 1897)
- Quelques mots sur André Vésale, ses ascendants, sa famille et sa demeure à Bruxelles (Brussels, 1898)
