= Martyrdom of the Ten Thousand =

1508 painting by Albrecht Dürer

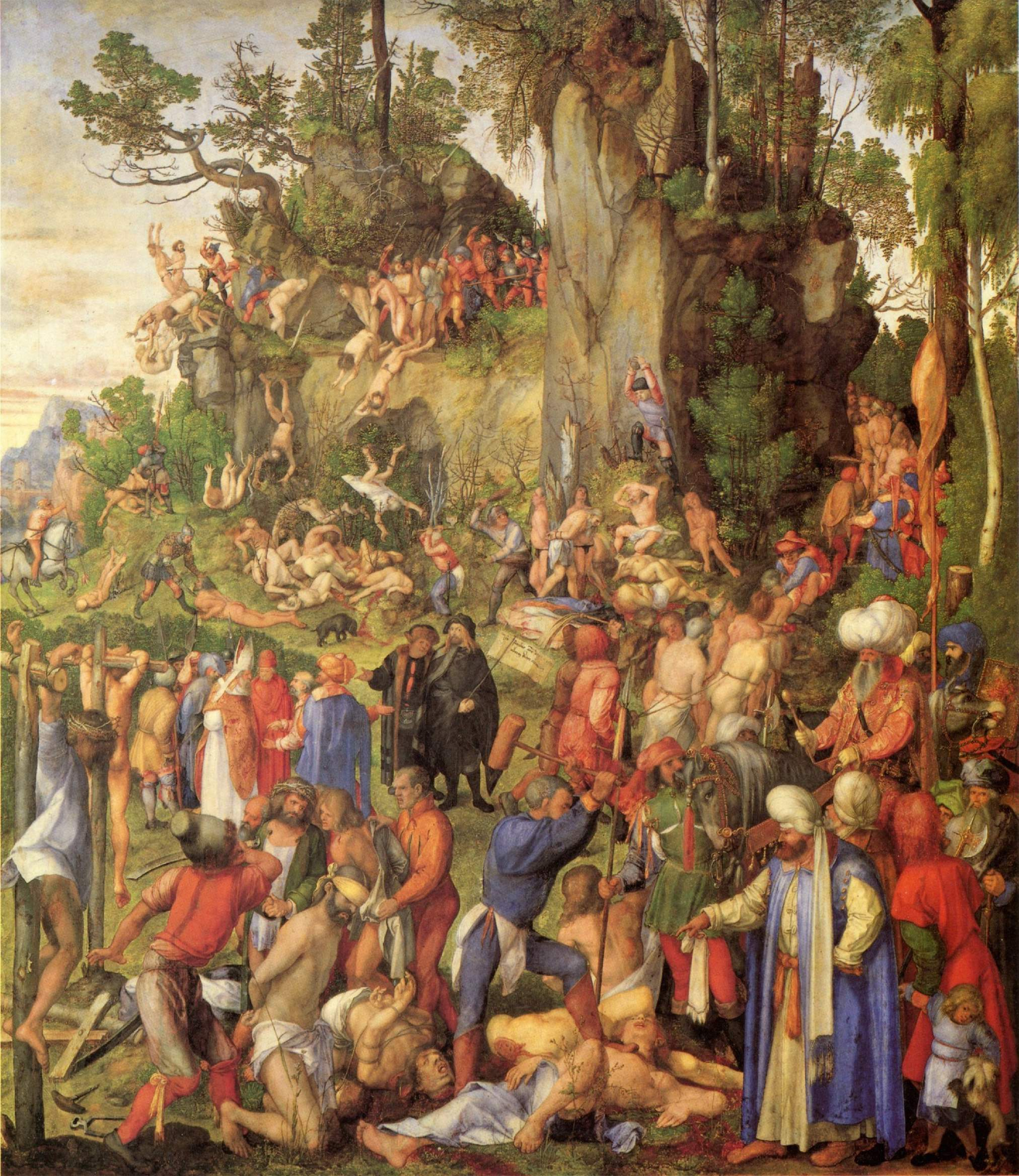
- Artist: Albrecht Dürer
- Year: 1508
- Type: Oil on panel transferred to canvas
- Dimensions: 99 cm × 87 cm (39 in × 34 in)
- Location: Kunsthistorisches Museum, Vienna

The Martyrdom of the Ten Thousand is an oil painting by Albrecht Dürer, dating to 1508 and now at the Kunsthistorisches Museum of Vienna, Austria. It is signed on a cartouche which hangs from the artist's self-portrait in the center, saying Iste faciebat Ano Domini 1508 Albertus Dürer Aleman.

== History ==
The painting was commissioned by Frederick III, Elector of Saxony for the All Saints' Church, Wittenberg. Frederick had been Dürer's patron since 1496. He himself chose the subject, as his collection of relics included some of the Ten thousand martyrs.

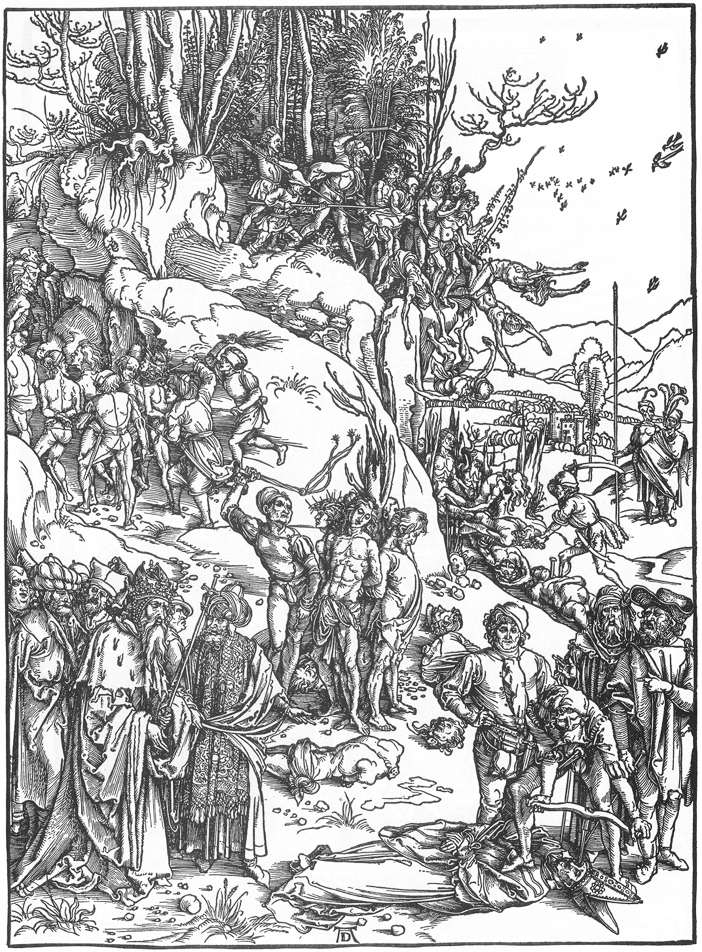
The similar 1496 woodcut.

Dürer had used the same subject for a woodcut of some ten years before, but in the new work he eliminated some macabre details such as the torture of the bishop Acacius, having his eyes stripped through a drill. This scene was replaced by a crucifixion on the right and by the presence of the bishop in chains behind it.

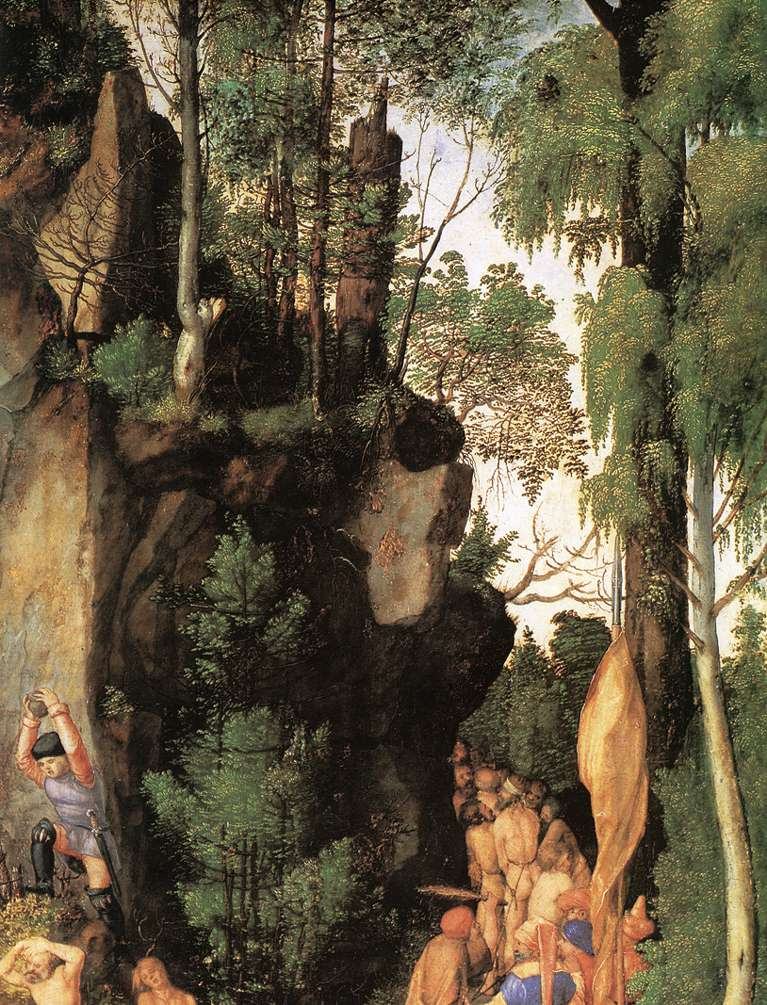
Detail of the forest.

The work was repeatedly mentioned in the correspondence between the artist and Jakob Heller of Frankfurt. Dürer received 280 florins for it.

== Description ==
The painting illustrates the legendary martyrdom of ten thousand Christian soldiers perpetrated on Mount Ararat by the King of Persia, Shapur II, by the order of the Roman emperor Hadrian or Antoninus Pius, or, according to other sources, Diocletian.

Dürer painted numerous different martyrdom scenes within a forest with clearings and cliffs. In the foreground are crucifixions, decapitations, crushing with a hammer. The Persian King is portrayed as an Ottoman sultan, riding a horse on the right. The executioners also wear gaudy Ottoman dress. In the background are prisoners walking through to a cliff from where they are thrown down against rocks and thorny bushes, as well as scenes of fighting, stoning and hitting with huge clubs.

At the center of the crowded scene, dressed in black, are two characters who walk placidly, apparently unaware of the horrors around them: one is Dürer's self-portrait (holding his signature), the other his friend and humanist Conrad Celtes, who had died a few months before the execution of the painting.

== See also ==
- List of paintings by Albrecht Dürer

== Sources ==
- Costantino Porcu, ed. (2004). Dürer. Milan: Rizzoli.
