= Master of the Legend of Saint Barbara =

Early Netherlandish painter

Master of the legend of St. Barbara (active 1470 – 1500), was an Early Netherlandish painter.

== Biography ==
He was active in Brussels, but has been considered to possibly be the same person as Aert van den Bossche because he signed into the Bruges Guild of St. Luke as 'Harnoult van den Boske' in 1505.

Max J. Friedländer identified several works by this master, not all of which have been reattributed to Aert van den Bossche.

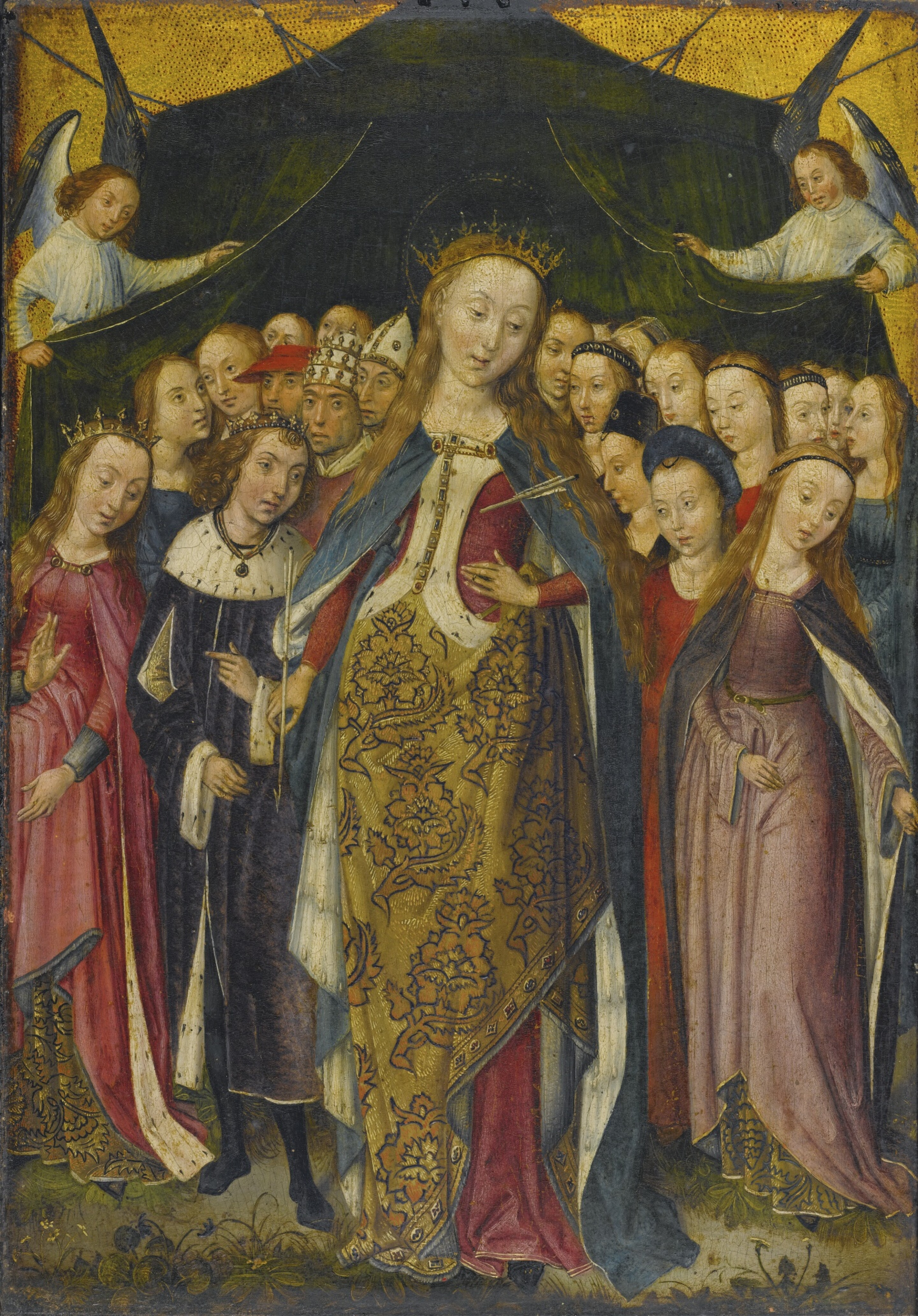
Saint Ursula Protecting the Eleven Thousand Virgins With Her Cloak

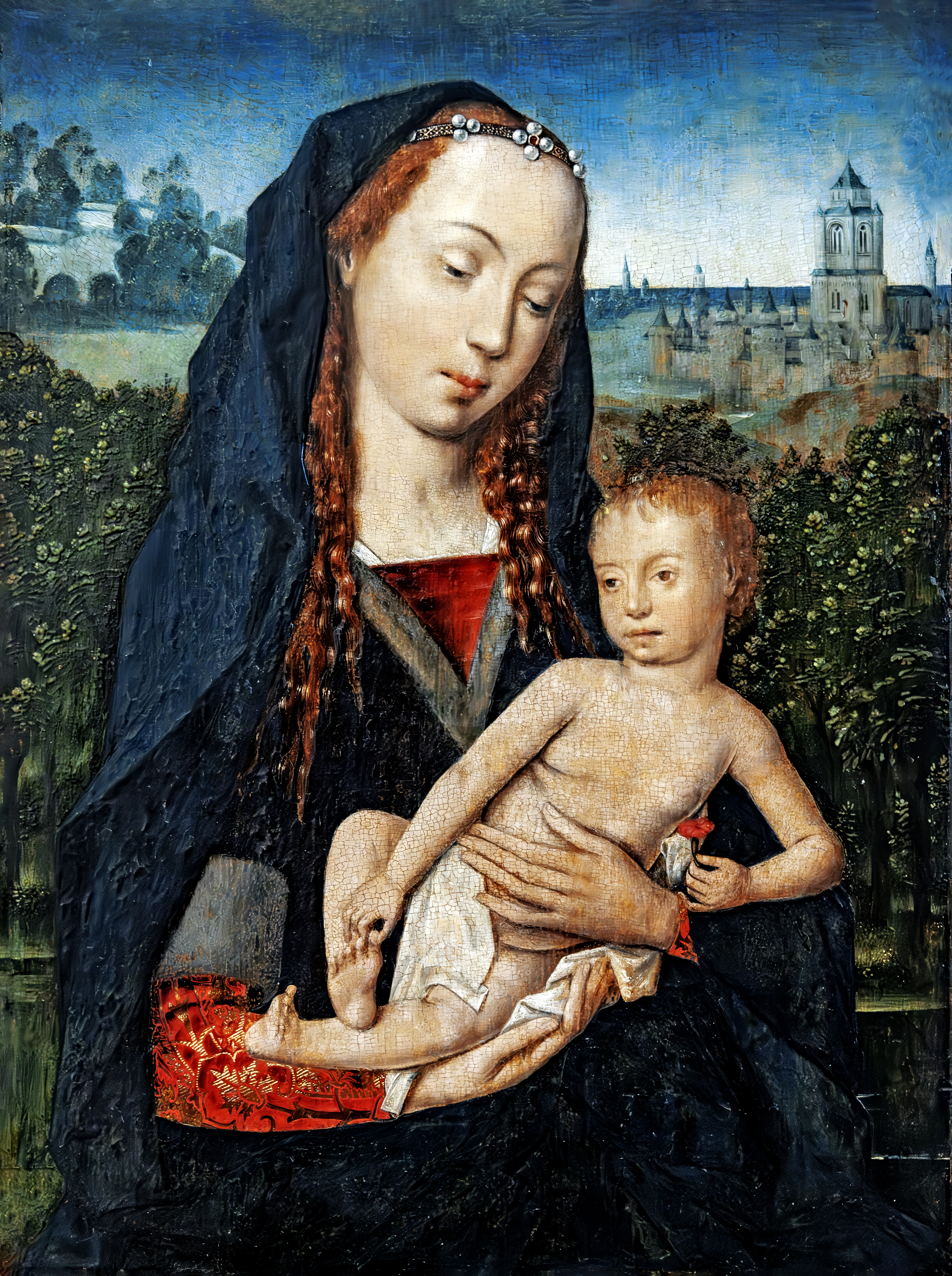
Madonna and Child - Museo Correr
