= Grand-Place =

Square and UNESCO World Heritage Site in Brussels, Belgium

Grand-Place (French); Grote Markt (Dutch)
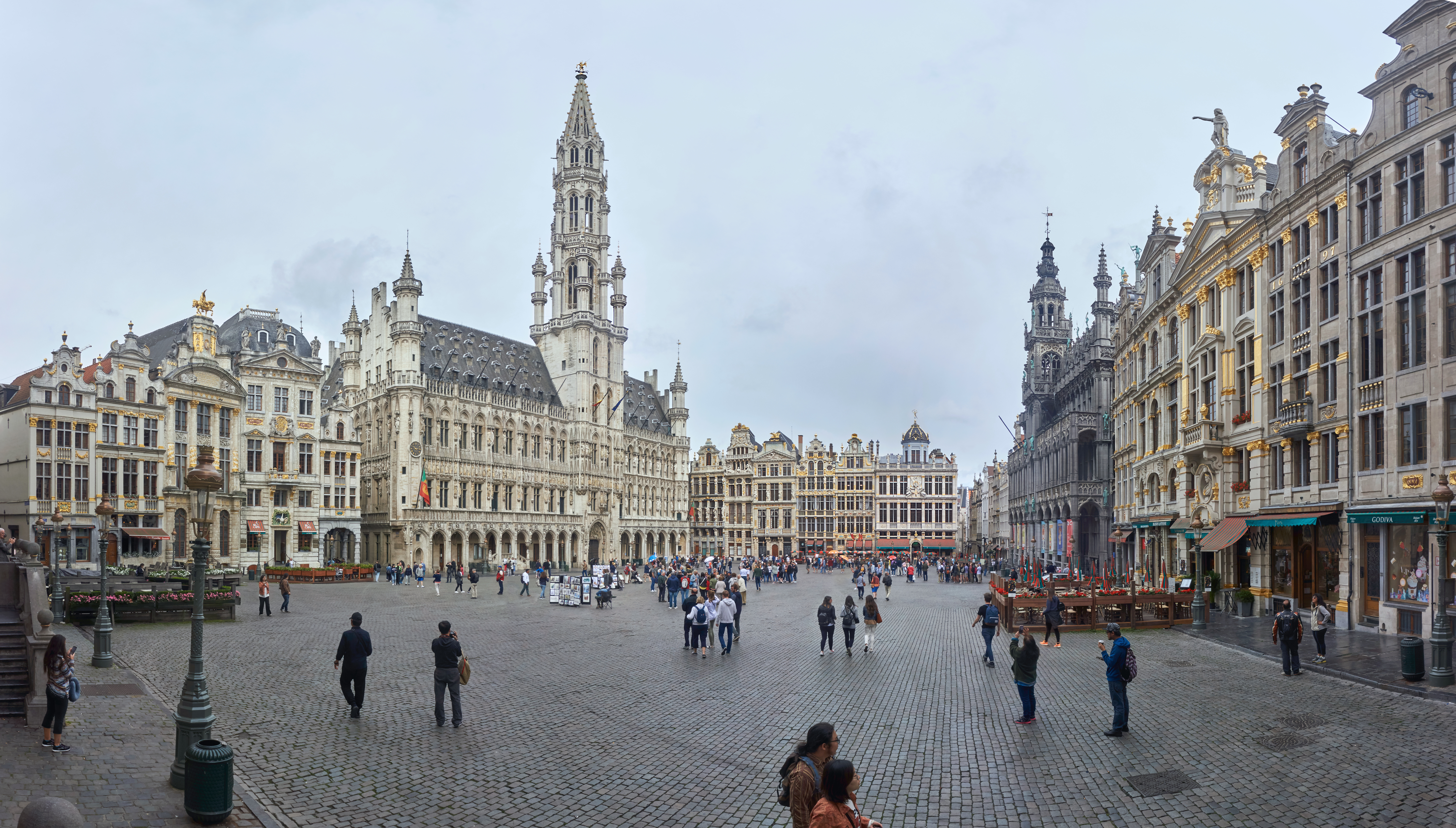
- The Grand-Place/Grote Markt, with Brussels' Town Hall on the left

- Location within Brussels Location within Belgium
- Native name: Grand-Place (French); Grote Markt (Dutch)
- Length: 110 m (360 ft)
- Width: 68 m (223 ft)
- Location: City of Brussels, Brussels-Capital Region, Belgium
- Quarter: Central Quarter
- Postal code: 1000
- Coordinates: 50°50′48″N 4°21′9″E

UNESCO World Heritage Site
- Criteria: Cultural: ii, iv
- Reference: 857
- Inscription: 1998 (22nd Session)
- Area: 1.48 hectares (3.7 acres)
- Buffer zone: 20.93 hectares (51.7 acres)

The Grand-Place (French, pronounced [ɡʁɑ̃ plas]; "Grand Square"; also used in English (Note: In this case, the French word place is a "false friend", and the correct counterparts in English are "plaza" or "town square".)) or Grote Markt (Dutch, pronounced [ˌɣroːtə ˈmɑr(ə)kt]; "Big Market") is the central square of Brussels, Belgium. It is surrounded by opulent Baroque guildhalls of the former Guilds of Brussels and two larger edifices: the city's Flamboyant Town Hall, and the neo-Gothic King's House or Bread House (Note: French: Maison du Roi; Dutch: Broodhuis) building, housing the Brussels City Museum. The square measures 68 by 110 metres (223 by 361 ft) and is entirely paved.

The Grand-Place's construction began in the 11th century and was largely complete by the 17th. In 1695, during the Nine Years' War, most of the square was destroyed during the bombardment of Brussels by French troops. Only the Town Hall's façade and tower, which served as a target for the artillery, as well as some stone walls, resisted the incendiary balls. The houses that surrounded the Grand-Place were rebuilt during subsequent years, giving the square its current appearance, though they were frequently modified in the following centuries. From the mid-19th century, the square's heritage value was rediscovered, and it was thoroughly renovated.

The Grand-Place is the most important tourist destination and most memorable landmark in Brussels. It is also considered one of the world's most beautiful squares, and has been a UNESCO World Heritage Site since 1998. The square frequently hosts festive and cultural events, among them, in August of every even year, the installation of an immense flower carpet in its centre. It is also a centre of annual celebrations during the Christmas and New Year period, and a Christmas tree has been erected annually on the square since the mid-20th century.

== Naming ==
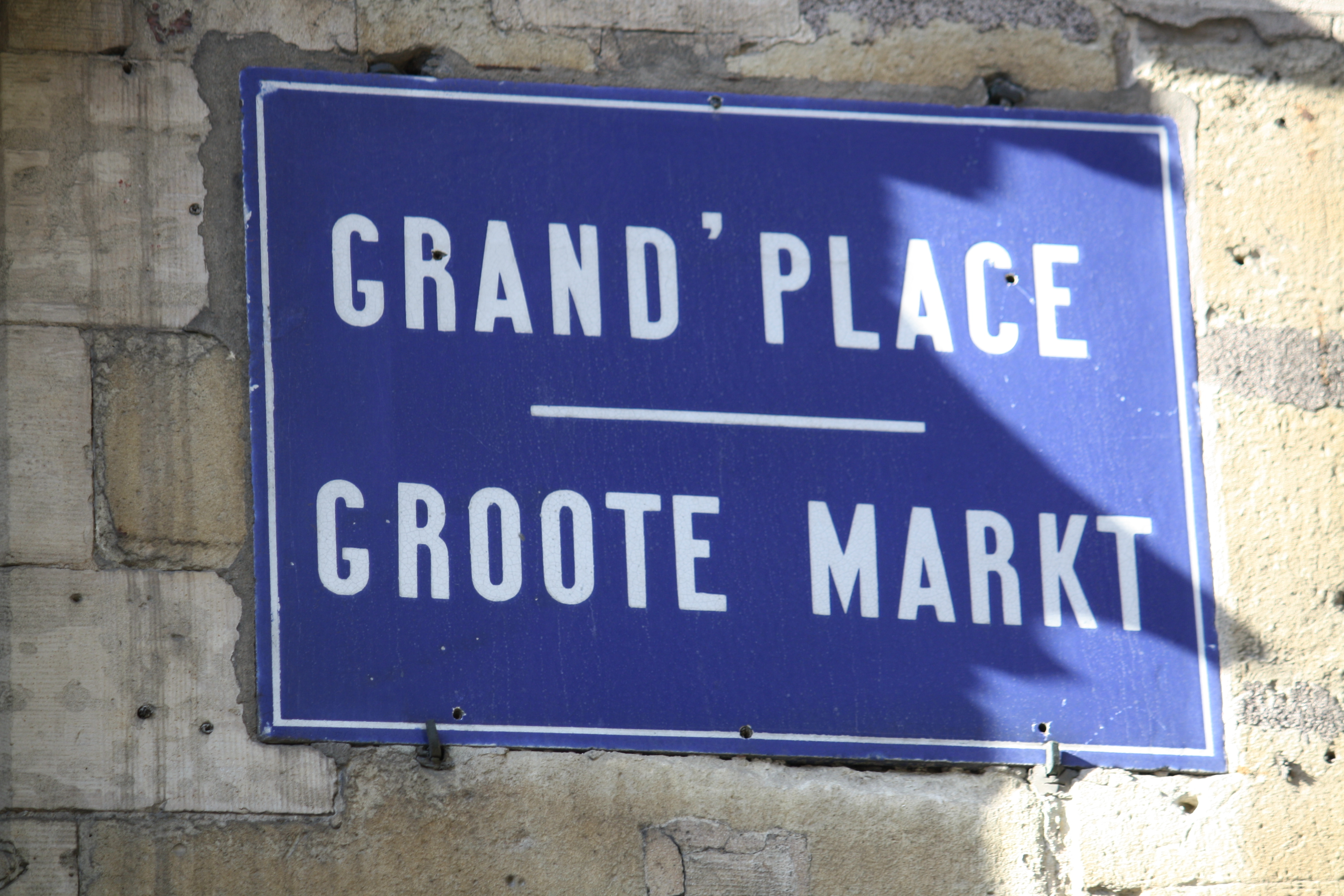
Two of the official names of the square in French and Dutch

The toponyms Grand-Place or Grand'Place (French, pronounced [ɡʁɑ̃ plas]; "Grand Square"; also used in English) are generic names designating a central town square, commonly used in Belgium and Northern France. Originally, the main square was the geographical centre of the towns and cities in these regions (for example the Grand-Place of Mons, Tournai, Arras, and Lille (Note: The latter is now named the Place du Général-de-Gaulle.)). The Grand-Place of Brussels is the location of the city's Town Hall, and thus its political centre. It also housed the largest marketplace in the city (hence its official names Grote Markt or Groote Markt, pronounced [ˌɣroːtə ˈmɑr(ə)kt]; literally meaning "Big Market", in Dutch).

Nowadays, the names Grand-Place (Note: This is the name used in the UNESCO description.) (with a hyphen) in French and Grote Markt (with one 'o') in Dutch are most commonly seen. The historical spellings Grand'Place (Note: These are the names used on the wall plaques giving the name of the square.) (with an apostrophe) in French and Groote Markt (with a double 'o') in Dutch are outdated, but are also still in use in certain sources, such as on wall plaques giving the name of the square. This outdated French spelling is a grammatical exception; place being feminine, the modern French form would be Grande Place. In the Brabantian dialect of Brussels (known as Brusselian, and also sometimes referred to as Marollian), the Grand-Place is called Gruute Met.

== History ==
=== Early history ===
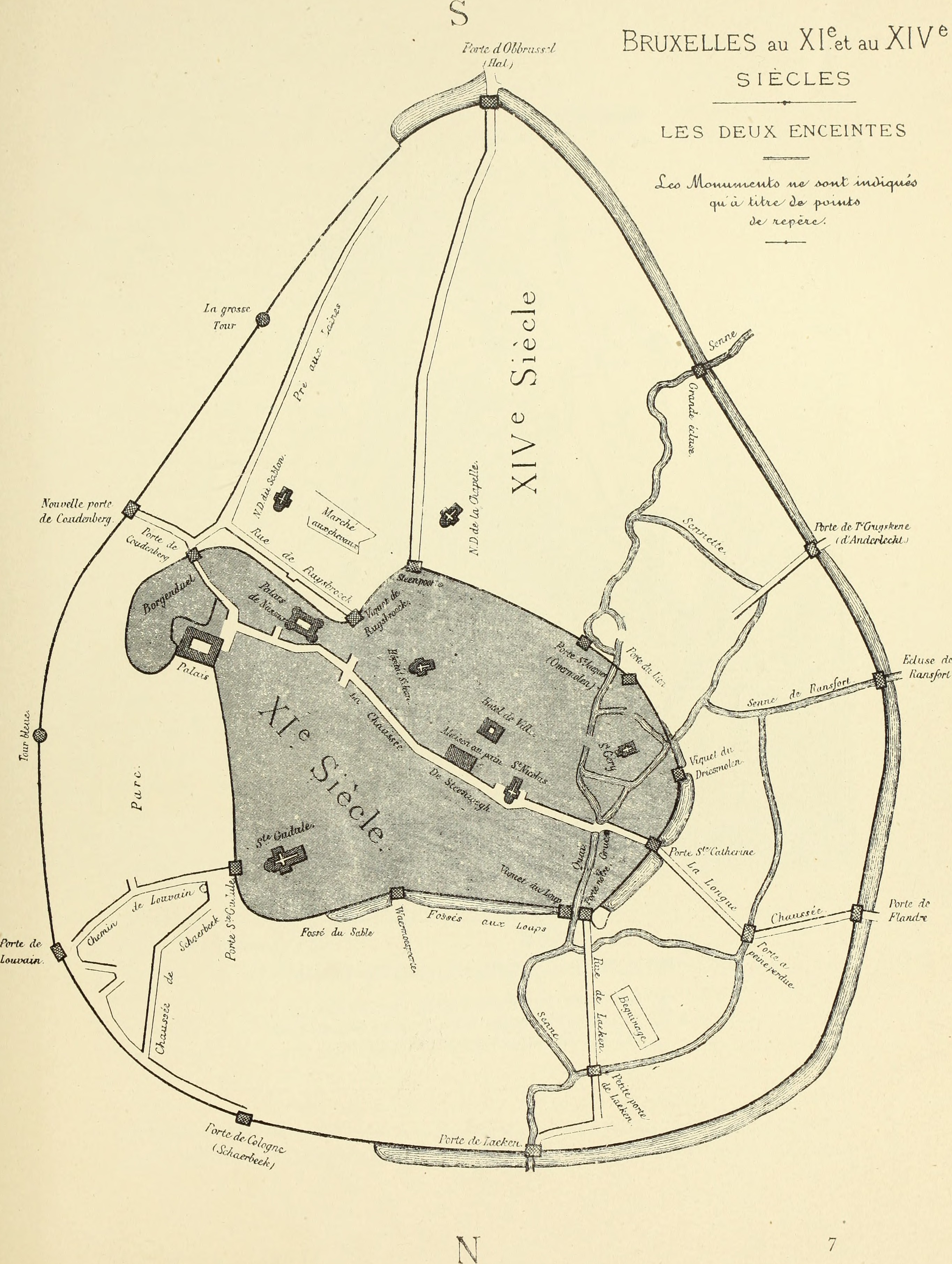
Schematic map of medieval Brussels; north is roughly below. The Bread House (Marché au pain) lies along the Causeway (Steenwegh) near St. Nicholas' Church and the Town Hall (Hôtel de Ville).

In the 10th century, Charles, Duke of Lower Lorraine, constructed a fort on Saint-Géry Island, the furthest inland point at which the river Senne was still navigable. The installation of a fort at this point marks the origin of what would become Brussels. By the end of the 11th century, an open-air marketplace was set up on a dried-up marsh near the fort that was surrounded by sandbanks. A document from 1174 mentions this lower market (Latin: forum inferius) not far from the port (Latin: portus) on the Senne. It was called the Nedermerckt (meaning "Lower Market" in Old Dutch) and likely grew around the same time as Brussels' commercial development. It was also well situated near St. Nicholas' Church and along the Causeway (Old Dutch: Steenwegh), an important trade route between the prosperous regions of the Rhineland (in modern-day Germany) and the County of Flanders.

At the beginning of the 13th century, three covered markets were built on the northern edge of the Grand-Place: a meat market, a bread market, and a cloth market. These buildings, which belonged to the Duke of Brabant, allowed the wares to be showcased even in bad weather, but also allowed the Dukes to keep track of the storage and sale of goods, in order to collect taxes. Other buildings, largely constructed of thatch and timber, with some made of stone (Old Dutch: steenen), enclosed the Grand-Place. Although none of these steenen remain, their names live on in nearby streets, such as the Plattesteen, the Cantersteen, or the Rue des Pierres/Steenstraat. In the middle of the market square stood a primitive public fountain. In 1302, it was replaced by a large stone fountain with eight water jets and eight basins, directly in front of the bread market.

=== Rise in importance ===
Improvements to the Grand-Place from the 14th century onwards would mark the rise in importance of local merchants and tradesmen relative to the nobility. As he was short on money, the Duke gradually transferred parts of his control rights over trade and mills to the local authorities, prompting them to build edifices worthy of their new status. In 1353, the City of Brussels ordered the construction of a large indoor cloth market (French: Halle au Drap), similar to those of the neighbouring cities of Mechelen and Leuven, to the south of the square. (Note: It is represented occupying the entire rear of the Town Hall in an engraving by Abraham van Santvoort after Leo van Heil, c. 1650.) At this point, the Grand-Place was still haphazardly laid out, and the buildings along the edges had a motley tangle of gardens and irregular additions. The city expropriated and demolished a number of buildings that clogged the square, and formally defined its edges.

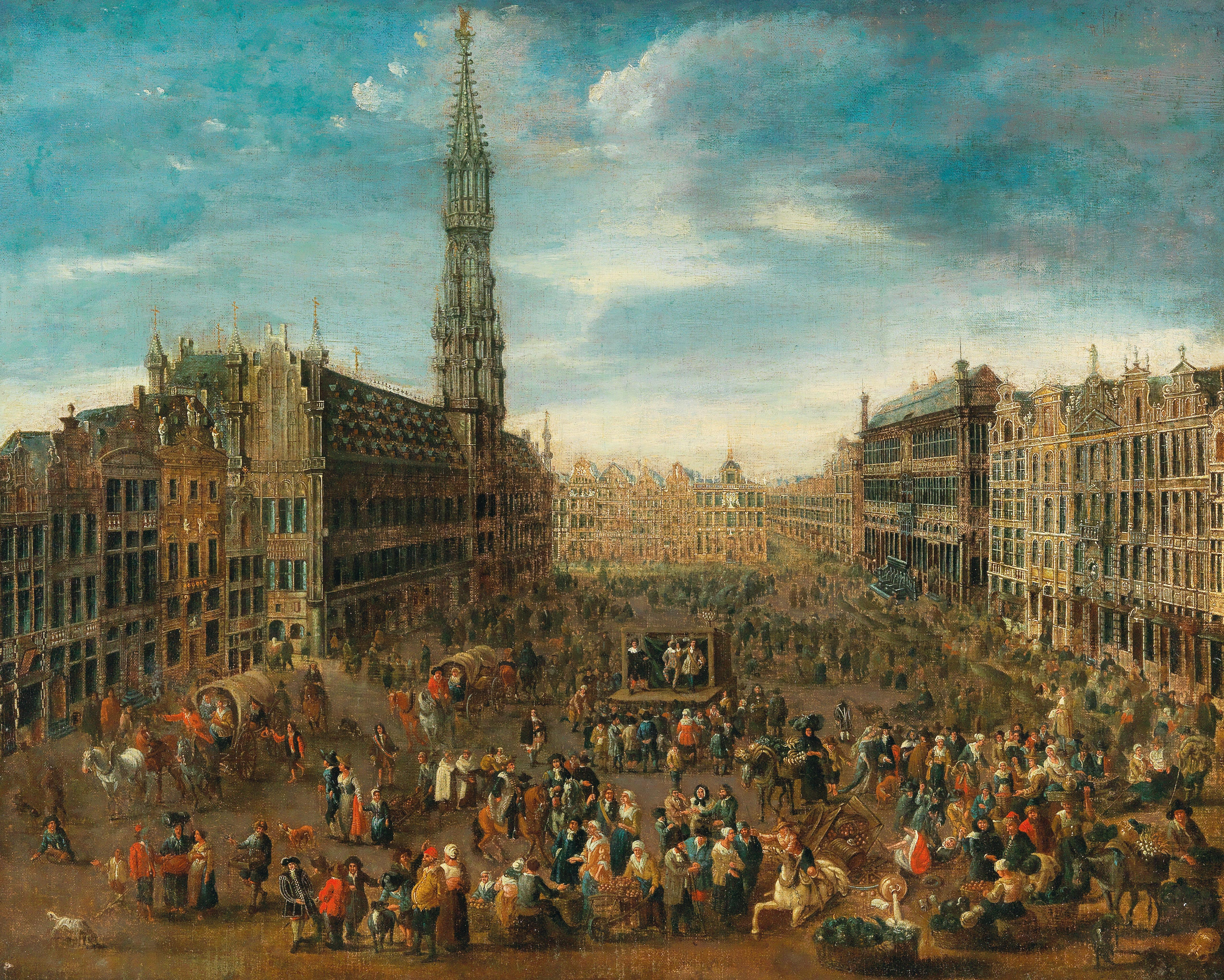
A market scene on the Grand-Place, c. 1670

Brussels' Town Hall was erected in stages, between 1401 and 1455, on the south side of the Grand-Place, transforming the square into the seat of municipal power. The Town Hall's spire towers some 96 metres (315 ft) high, and is capped by a 2.7 metres (8.9 ft) (Note: This is the height of Saint Michael alone. Including the base to the point of the sword, the statue is about 5 metres (16 ft) tall.) statue of Saint Michael slaying a demon or devil. To counter this, from 1504 to 1536, the Duke of Brabant ordered the construction of a large Flamboyant edifice across from the city hall to house his administrative services. It was erected on the site of the first cloth and bread markets, which were no longer in use, and it became known first as the Duke's House (Middle Dutch: 's Hertogenhuys), then as the King's House (Middle Dutch: 's Conincxhuys), although no king has ever lived there. It is currently known as the Maison du Roi ("King's House") in French, but in Dutch, it continues to be called the Broodhuis ("Bread House"), after the market whose place it took. Over time, wealthy merchants and the increasingly powerful Guilds of Brussels built houses around the square.

The Grand-Place witnessed many tragic events unfold during its history. In 1523, the first Protestant martyrs Jan van Essen and Hendrik Vos were burned by the Inquisition on the square. Forty years later, in 1568, two statesmen, Lamoral, Count of Egmont and Philip de Montmorency, Count of Horn, who had spoken out against the policies of King Philip II in the Spanish Netherlands, were beheaded in front of the King's House. This triggered the beginning of the armed revolt against Spanish rule, of which William of Orange took the lead. In 1719, it was the turn of François Anneessens, dean of the Nation of St. Christopher, who was beheaded on the Grand-Place because of his resistance to innovations in city government detrimental to the power of the guilds and for his suspected involvement with uprisings within the Austrian Netherlands.

=== Destruction and rebuilding ===
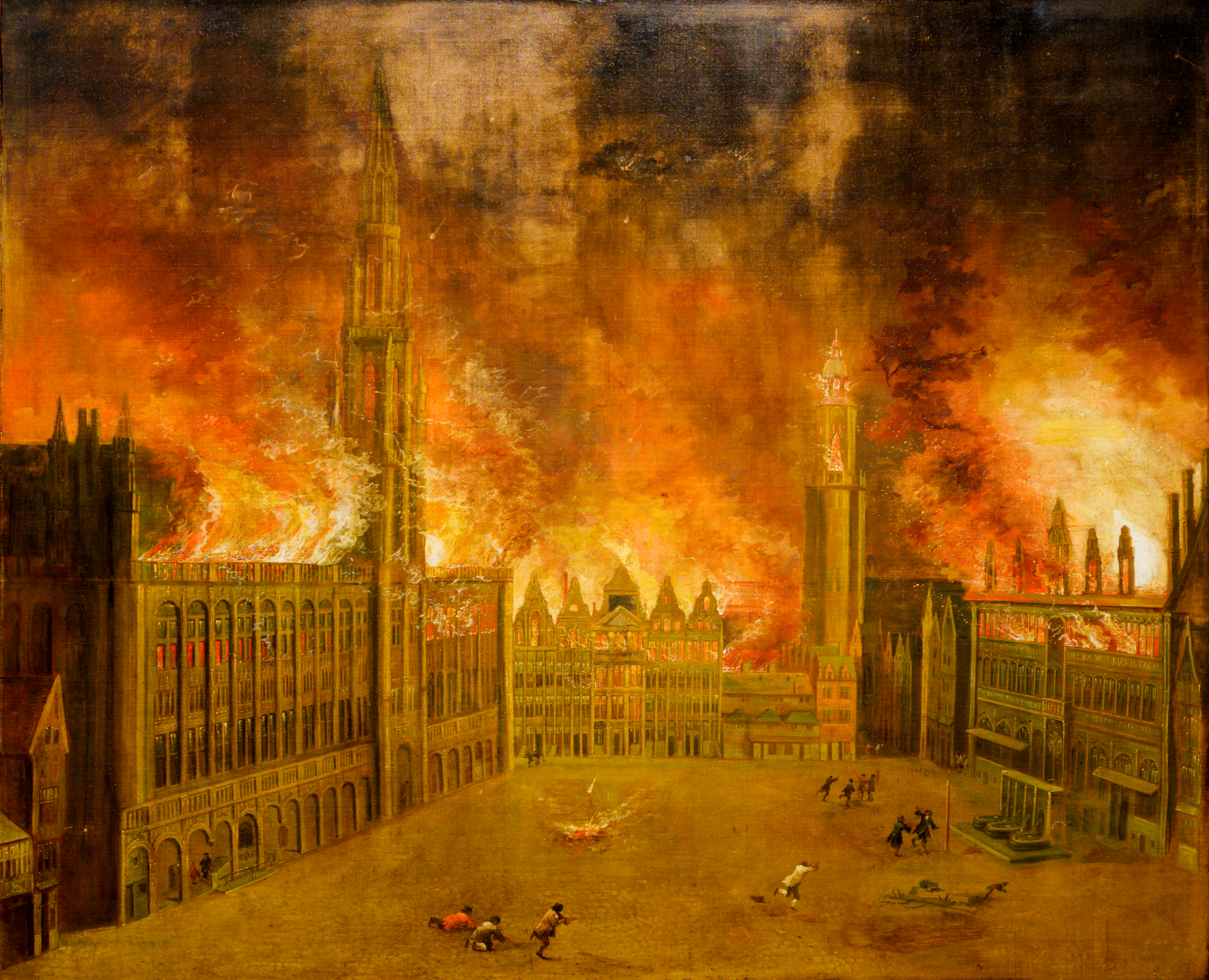
The Grand-Place in flames during the bombardment of Brussels in 1695. On the left, the Town Hall; on the right, the King's House, and in the background, St. Nicholas' Church.

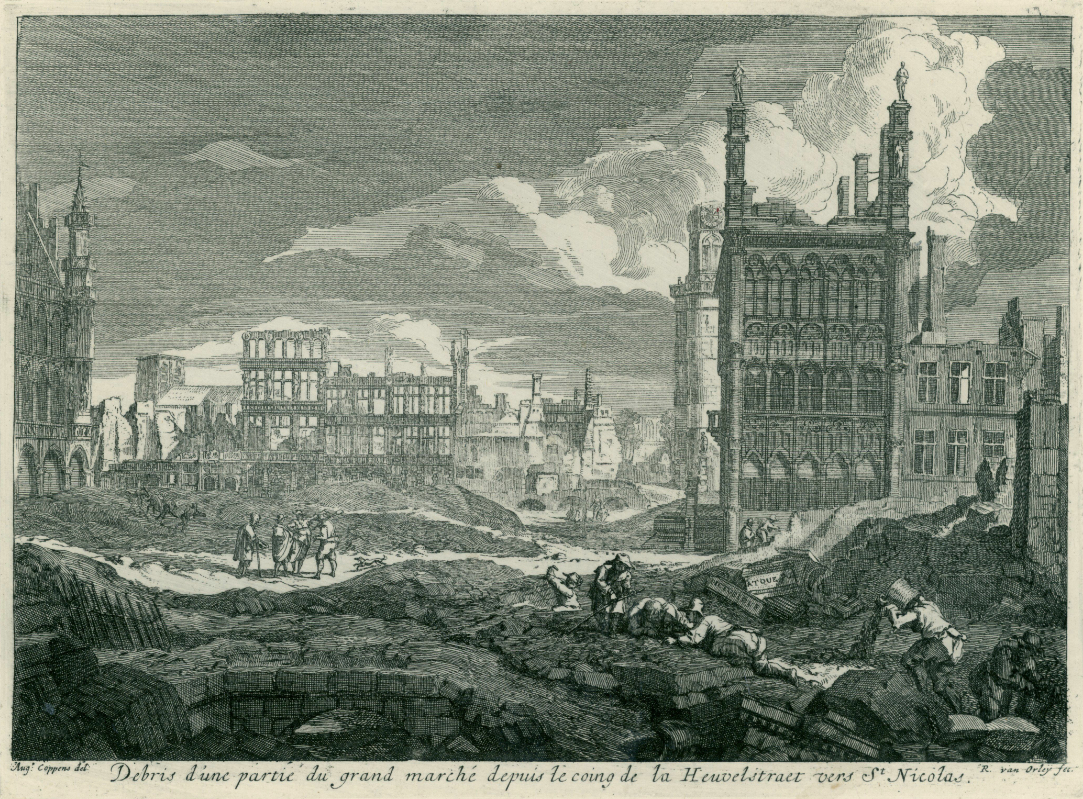
View of the ruins of the Grand-Place after the bombardment from the corner of the Rue de la Colline/Heuvelstraat towards St. Nicholas

On 13 August 1695, during the Nine Years' War, a 70,000-strong French army under Marshal François de Neufville, duc de Villeroy, began a bombardment of Brussels in an effort to draw the League of Augsburg's forces away from their siege on French-held Namur in what is now Wallonia. The French launched a massive bombardment of the mostly defenceless city centre with cannons and mortars, setting it on fire and flattening the majority of the Grand-Place and the surrounding city. Only the stone shell of the Town Hall and a few fragments of other buildings remained standing. That the Town Hall survived at all is ironic, as it was the principal target of the artillery fire.

After the bombardment, the Grand-Place was swiftly rebuilt in the following four years by the city's guilds and other owners. Their efforts were regulated by the city's councillors and the Governor of Brussels, who required that their plans be submitted to the authorities for approval, and fines were threatened against those who did not comply. In addition, the alignments of the buildings were once again improved. This helped deliver a remarkably harmonious layout for the rebuilt square, despite the ostensibly clashing combination of Gothic, Baroque and Louis XIV style.

During the following two centuries, the Grand-Place underwent significant damage. In the late 18th century, French revolutionaries known as the sans-culottes sacked it, destroying statues of the nobility and symbols of Christianity. The guilds declined in importance in conjunction with the growing obsolescence of this form of economic organisation and the rise of proto-capitalism. They were abolished in 1795, under the French regime, and the guildhalls' furniture and archives were seized by the state and sold at public auction on the square in 1796. The remaining buildings were neglected and left in poor condition, with their façades painted, stuccoed and damaged by pollution. The square itself was proclaimed "Square of the People" by a decree of the 30 Ventôse An IV (1795) and a "Liberty tree" was planted on that occasion. At the first hours of Belgian Independence, in 1830, skirmishes occurred on the Grand-Place, which became, for an extremely short time, the "Square of Regency".

By the late 19th century, a sensitivity arose about the heritage value of the buildings – the turning point was the demolition of the L'Étoile (Dutch: De Sterre) guildhall in 1853 to widen the street on the left of the Town Hall in order to allow the passage of a horse-drawn tramway. Under the impulse of the city's then-mayor, Charles Buls, the authorities had the Grand-Place returned to its former splendour, with buildings restored or reconstructed. In 1856, a monumental fountain commemorating the twenty-fifth anniversary of the reign of King Leopold I was installed in the centre of the square. It was replaced in 1864 by a fountain surmounted by statues of the Counts of Egmont and Horn, which was erected in front of the King's House and later moved to the Square du Petit Sablon/Kleine Zavelsquare. Thirty years later, during the Belle Époque, a bandstand was raised in its place.

The Grand-Place attracted many famous visitors during that period, among them Victor Hugo, who resided in the Le Pigeon (Dutch: De Duif) guildhall in 1852, as well as Charles Baudelaire, who gave two conferences at the King's House in the 1860s. In 1885, the Belgian Workers' Party (POB/BWP), the first socialist party in Belgium, was founded during a meeting at the Grand-Place, at the same place where the First International had convened, and where Karl Marx had written The Communist Manifesto in 1848.

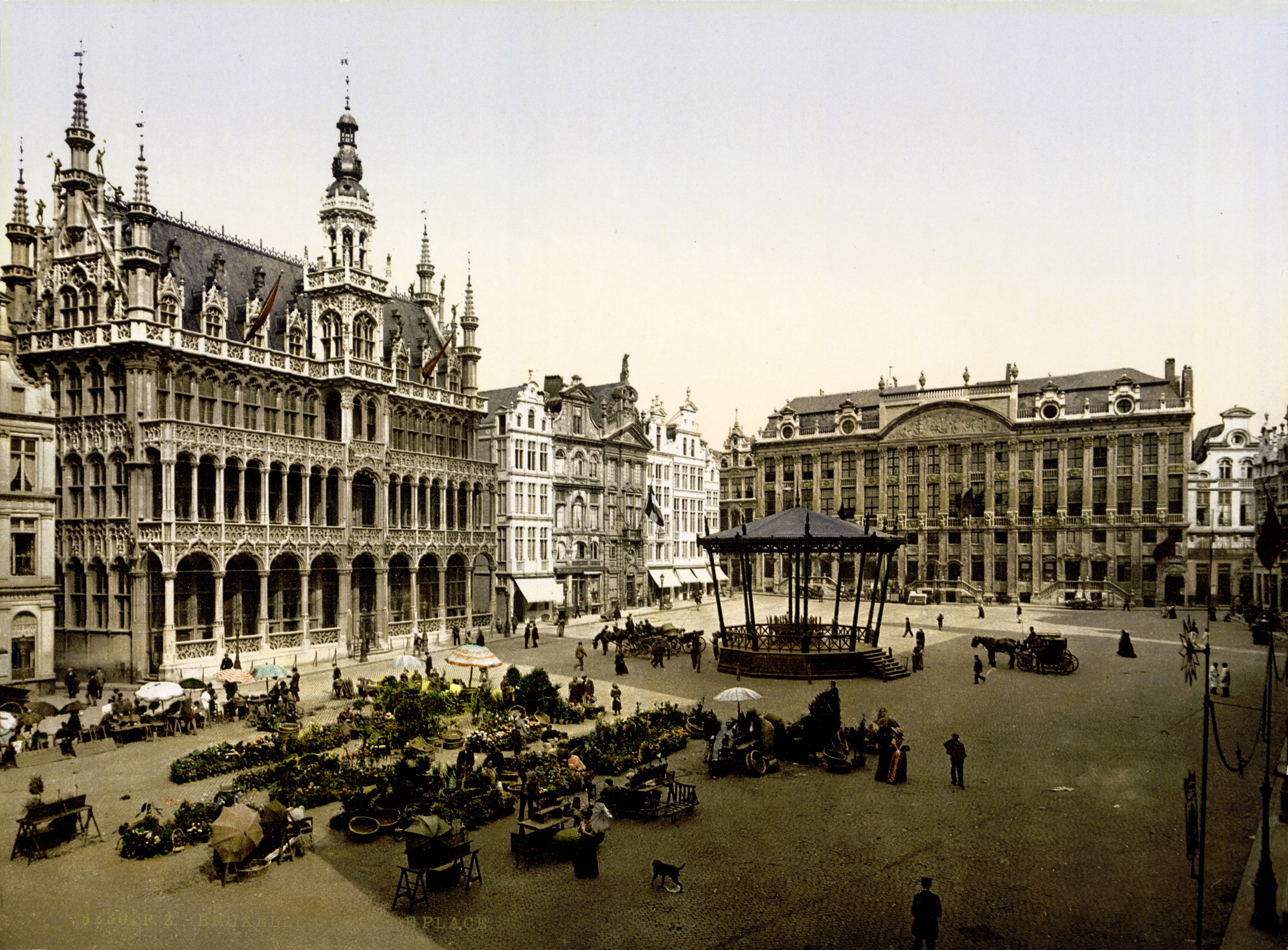
The Grand-Place, c. 1895, with the bandstand in its centre

=== 20th and 21st centuries ===
At the start of World War I, as refugees flooded Brussels, the Grand-Place was filled with military and civilian casualties. The Town Hall served as a makeshift hospital. On 20 August 1914, at 2 p.m., the occupying German army arrived at the Grand-Place and set up field kitchens. The occupiers hoisted a German flag at the left side of the Town Hall.

The Grand-Place continued to serve as a market until 19 November 1959, and it is still called the Grote Markt ("Big Market") in Dutch. Neighbouring streets still reflect the area's origins, named after the sellers of butter, cheese, herring, coal, and so on. During the 1960s, in a low period of appreciation, the square served as a car parking area, but the parking spaces were removed in 1972 following a campaign by citizens. However, car traffic continued to pass through the square until 1990.

In 1979, the Grand-Place was bombed by the Irish Republican Army (IRA). A bomb planted under an open‐air stage where a British Army band was preparing to give a concert injured at least 15 persons, including four bandsmen, and caused extensive damage.

In 1990, the Grand-Place was pedestrianised, a first step in the pedestrianisation of central Brussels, and it is currently part of a large pedestrian zone in the centre of Brussels. The City of Brussels had been thinking about pedestrianising the square and its surrounding streets for several years, but a car park nearby prevented the project from materialising. When its licence ran out in September 1990, the city took the opportunity to conduct a pedestrian experiment. For three-and-a-half months, all traffic was to be banned on the Grand-Place, and also on the adjacent streets. After 1 January 1991, they would decide for good.

The Grand-Place was named by UNESCO as a World Heritage Site in 1998. The place is now primarily an important tourist attraction. A number of guildhalls have been converted into shops, terraced restaurants and brasseries. Notable institutions include Godiva chocolatier and Maison Dandoy biscuiterie. One of the houses owned by the brewers' guild is home to a brewers' museum. In addition, the Museum of Cocoa and Chocolate (since 2014, Choco-Story Brussels) was founded in July 1998 in the De Valck building, at 9–11, rue de la Tête d'or/Guldenhoofdstraat, just off the Grand-Place.

== Buildings around the square ==
=== Town Hall ===
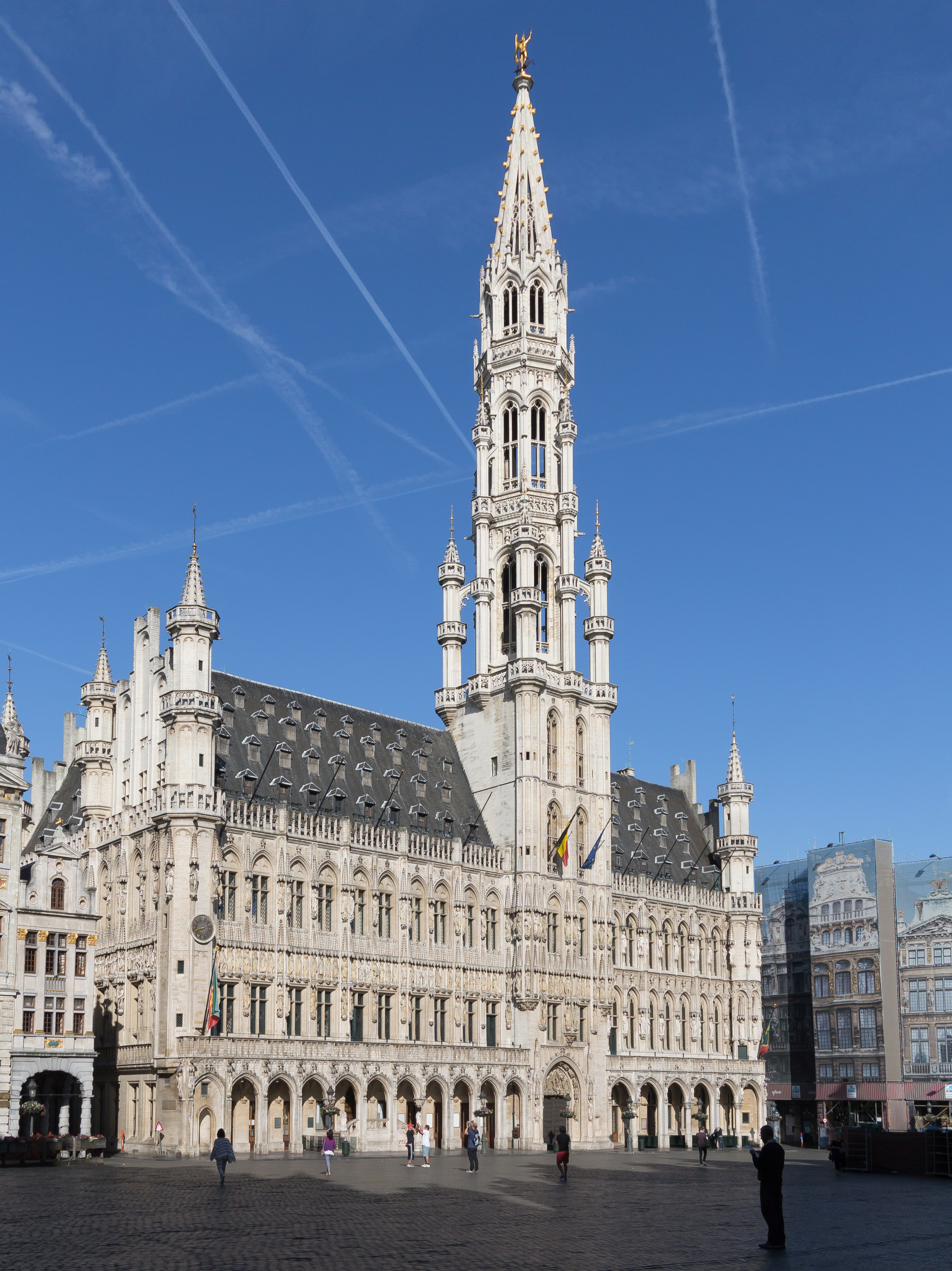
Brussels' Town Hall stands 96 metres (315 ft) tall and is capped by a 2.7 metres (8.9 ft) statue of Saint Michael slaying a demon.

The Town Hall (French: Hôtel de Ville, Dutch: Stadhuis) is the central edifice on the Grand-Place. It was erected in stages, between 1401 and 1455, on the south side of the square, transforming it into the seat of municipal power. It is also the square's only surviving medieval building. The Town Hall not only housed the city's magistrate, but also, until 1795, the States of Brabant, the representation of the three estates (nobility, clergy and commoners) to the court of the Duke of Brabant. In 1830, the Provisional Government operated from there during the Belgian Revolution.

The oldest part of the present building is its east wing (to the left when facing the front). This wing, together with a shorter tower, was built between 1401 and 1421. The architect and designer is probably Jacob van Thienen with whom Jean Bornoy collaborated. The young Duke Charles the Bold laid the first stone of the west wing in 1444. The architect of this part of the building is unknown. Historians think that it could be William (Willem) de Voghel who was the architect of the City of Brussels in 1452, and who was also, at that time, the designer of the Aula Magna, the great hall at the Palace of Coudenberg.

The façade is decorated with numerous statues representing the local nobility (such as the Dukes and Duchesses of Brabant and knights of the Noble Houses of Brussels), saints, and allegorical figures. The present sculptures are mainly 19th- and 20th-century reproductions or creations; the original 15th-century ones are kept in the Brussels City Museum in the King's House or Bread House building across the Grand-Place.

The 96-metre-high (315 ft) tower in Brabantine Gothic style is the work of Jan van Ruysbroek, the court architect of Philip the Good. Above the roof of the Town Hall, the square tower body narrows to a lavishly pinnacled octagonal openwork. At its summit stands a 2.7-metre-tall (9 ft) gilt metal statue of Saint Michael, the patron saint of the City of Brussels, slaying a dragon or demon. This statue is attributed to Maarten (Martin) Van Rode and was installed on the tower in 1455. It was removed in the 1990s and replaced by a copy. The original is also in the Brussels City Museum.

The Town Hall is asymmetrical, since the tower is not exactly in the middle of the building and the left part and the right part are not identical (although they seem so at first sight). According to a legend, the architect of the building, upon discovering this "error", leapt to his death from the tower. More likely, the asymmetry of the Town Hall was an accepted consequence of the scattered construction history and space constraints.

After various waves of restoration, the interior of the Town Hall has become dominated by the neo-Gothic: the Maximilian Room and its antechamber with tapestries depicting the life of Clovis, the ornate States of Brabant Room (Municipal Council Room), the likewise richly furnished Gothic Room and the Wedding Room (formerly the courtroom).

=== King's House ===
The Brussels City Museum is located in the Maison du Roi (King's House) or Broodhuis (Bread House).

As early as the 12th century, the King's House (French: Maison du Roi) was a wooden building where bread was sold, hence the name it kept in Dutch: Broodhuis (Bread House or Bread Hall). The original building was replaced in the 15th century by a stone building that housed the administrative services of the Duke of Brabant, which is why it was first called the Duke's House (Middle Dutch: 's Hertogenhuys), and when the same duke became King of Spain, it was renamed the King's House (Middle Dutch: 's Conincxhuys). In the 16th century, Holy Roman Emperor Charles V ordered his court architect, Antoon II Keldermans, to rebuild it in a late Gothic style very similar to the contemporary design, although without towers or galleries.

The King's House was restored after suffering extensive damage from the bombardment of 1695. A second restoration followed in 1767, when it received a neoclassical-style portal and a large roof pierced with three oeil-de-boeuf windows. It was reconstructed once again between 1874 and 1896, in its current neo-Gothic form, by the architect Victor Jamaer, in the style of his mentor, Eugène Viollet-le-Duc. On that occasion, Jamaer built two galleries and a central tower. He also adorned the façade with statues and other decorations. At the rear, he added a new, much more sober wing in neo-Flemish Renaissance style. The new King's House was officially inaugurated in 1896. The current building, whose interior was renovated in 1985, has housed the Brussels City Museum since 1887, in which, among other things, the Town Hall's original sculptures are shown.

=== Houses of the Grand-Place ===
The Grand-Place is lined on each side with a number of guildhalls and a few private houses. At first modest structures, in their current form, they are largely the result of the reconstruction after the bombardment of 1695. The strongly structured façades with their rich sculptural decoration including pilasters and balustrades and their lavishly designed gables are based on Italian Baroque with some Flemish influences. The architects involved in the new development were Jan Cosijn, Pieter Herbosch, Antoine Pastorana, Cornelis van Nerven, Guilliam or Willem de Bruyn and Adolphe Samyn.

In addition to the name of the respective guild, each house has its own name. The house numbering starts at the northern corner of the square to the left of the Rue au Beurre/Boterstraat in a counter-clockwise direction. The most ornate houses are probably nos. 1 to 7 on the north-western side. On the south-western side, between the Rue de la Tête d'or/Guldenhoofdstraat and Rue Charles Buls/Karel Bulsstraat, are the Town Hall, and the houses nos. 8 to 12 to the left of it on the south-eastern side. Still on the south-eastern side, between the Rue des Chapeliers/Hoedenmakersstraat and the Rue de la Colline/Bergstraat, are the houses nos. 13 to 19. On the north-eastern side, the King's House, which is located between the Rue des Harengs/Haringstraat and the Rue Chair et Pain/Vlees-en-Broodstraat, is to the right of the houses nos. 20 to 28 and to the left of the houses nos. 34 to 39.

#	French name	Dutch name	English translation	Original guild/function	Site plan
1	Le Roy d'Espagne	Den Coninck van Spaigniën	"The King of Spain"	House of the Corporation of Bakers	
2–3	La Brouette	Den Cruywagen	"The Wheelbarrow"	House of the Corporation of Greasers	
4	Le Sac	Den Sack	"The Bag"	House of the Corporation of Carpenters	
5	La Louve	Den Wolf / Den Wolvin	"The She-Wolf"	House of the Oath of Archers	
6	Le Cornet	Den Horen	"The Cornet"	House of the Corporation of Boatmen	
7	Le Renard	Den Vos	"The Fox"	House of the Corporation of Haberdashers	
8	L'Étoile	De Sterre	"The Star"	House of the Amman	
9	Le Cygne	De Zwane	"The Swan"	House of the Corporation of Butchers	
10	L'Arbre d'Or	Den Gulden Boom	"The Golden Tree"	House of the Corporation of Brewers	
11	La Rose	De Roos	"The Rose"	Private house	
12	Le Mont Thabor	Den Bergh Thabor	"The Mount Thabor"	Private house	
12a	Maison d'Alsemberg / Le Roi de Bavière	Huis van Alsemberg / De Koning van Beieren	"House of Alsemberg" / "The King of Bavaria"	Private house	
13–19	Maison des Ducs de Brabant	Huis van de Hertogen van Brabant	"House of the Dukes of Brabant"	Various (see below)	
13	La Renommée	De Faem	"The Fame"	Private house	
14	L'Ermitage	De Cluyse	"The Hermitage"	House of the Corporation of Carpet Makers	
15	La Fortune	De Fortuin	"The Fortune"	House of the Corporation of Tanners	
16	Le Moulin à Vent	De Windmolen	"The Windmill"	House of the Corporation of Millers	
17	Le Pot d'Étain	De Tinnepot	"The Tin Pot"	House of the Corporation of Cartwrights	
18	La Colline	De Heuvel	"The Hill"	House of the Corporation of Sculptors, Masons, Stone-Cutters and Slate-Cutters	
19	La Bourse	De Borse	"The Purse"	Private house	
20	Le Cerf	Den Hert / Het Heert	"The Deer"	Private house	
21–22	Joseph et Anne	Joseph en Anna	"Joseph and Anne"	Private houses	
23	L'Ange	Den Engel	"The Angel"	Private house	
24–25	La Chaloupe d'Or	Den Gulden Boot	"The Golden Boat"	House of the Corporation of Tailors	
26–27	Le Pigeon	De Duif	"The Dove"	House of the Corporation of Painters	
28	Le Marchand d'Or / Aux Armes de Brabant	De Gulden Koopman / De Wapens van Brabant	"The Golden Merchant" / "The Arms of Brabant"	House of the Corporation of Greasers	
34	Le Heaume	Den Helm	"The Helmet"	Private house	
35	Le Paon	Den Pauw	"The Peacock"	Private house	
36–37	Le Petit Renard / Le Samaritain and Le Chêne	't Voske / De Samaritaen and Den Eycke	"The Little Fox" / "The Samaritan" and "The Oak"	Private houses	
38	Sainte-Barbe	Sint Barbara	"Saint Barbara"	Private house	
39	L'Âne	Den Ezel	"The Donkey"	Private house	

From right to left: Le Roy d'Espagne, La Brouette, Le Sac, La Louve, Le Cornet and Le Renard

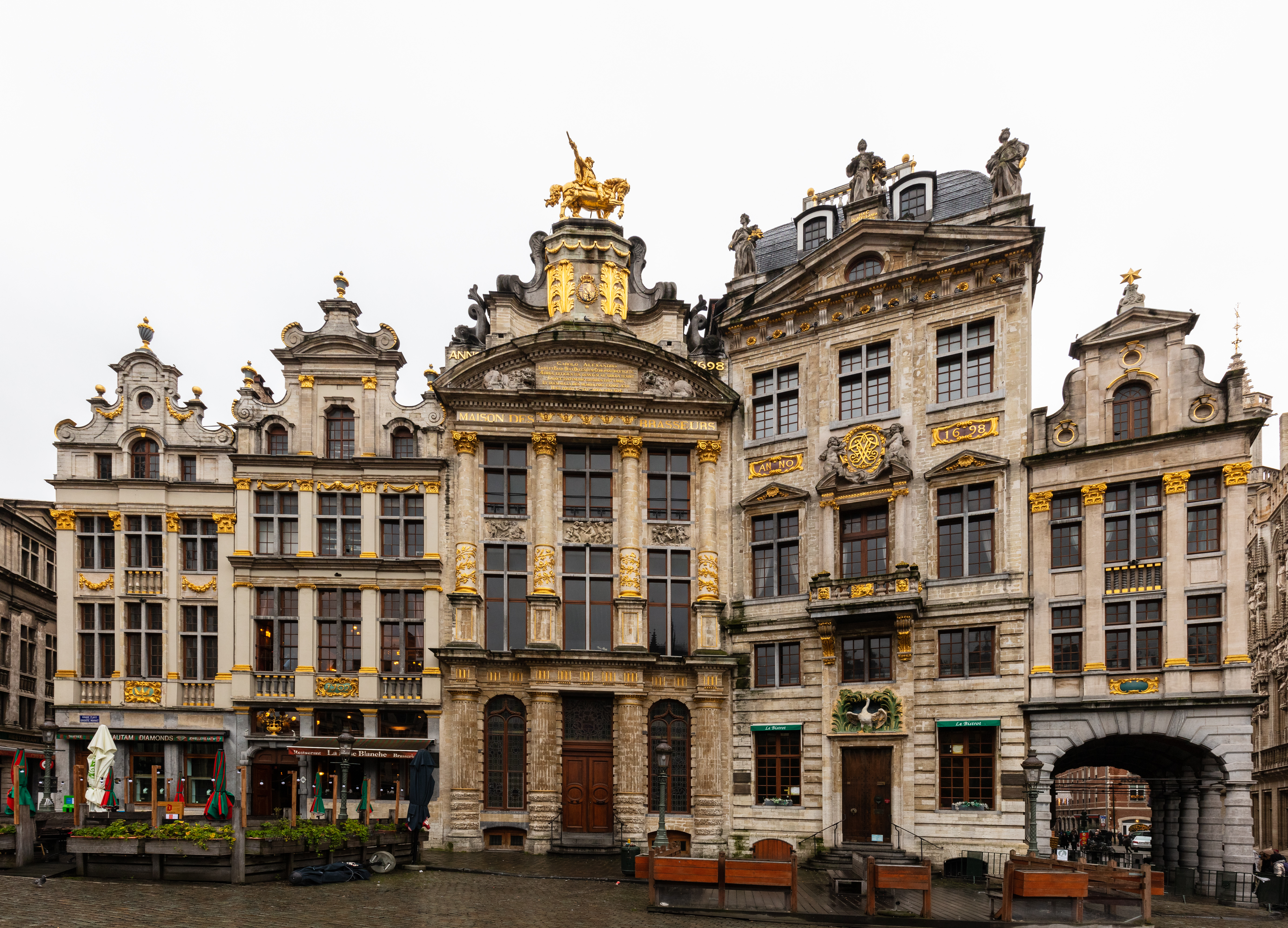
From right to left: L'Étoile, Le Cygne, L'Arbre d'Or, La Rose and Le Mont Thabor

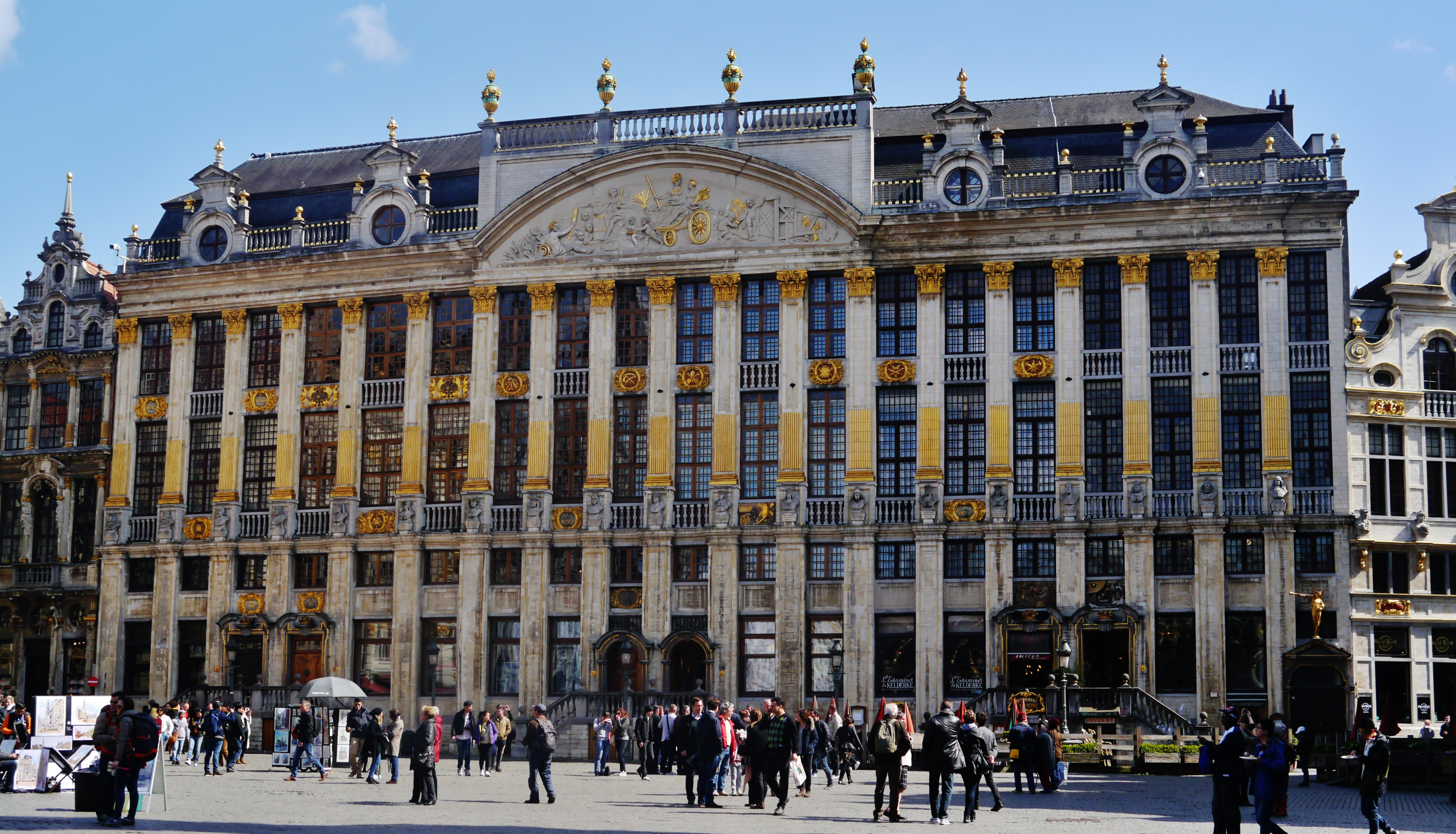
House of the Dukes of Brabant

From right to left: Le Cerf, Joseph et Anne, L'Ange, La Chaloupe d'Or, Le Pigeon and Le Marchand d'Or

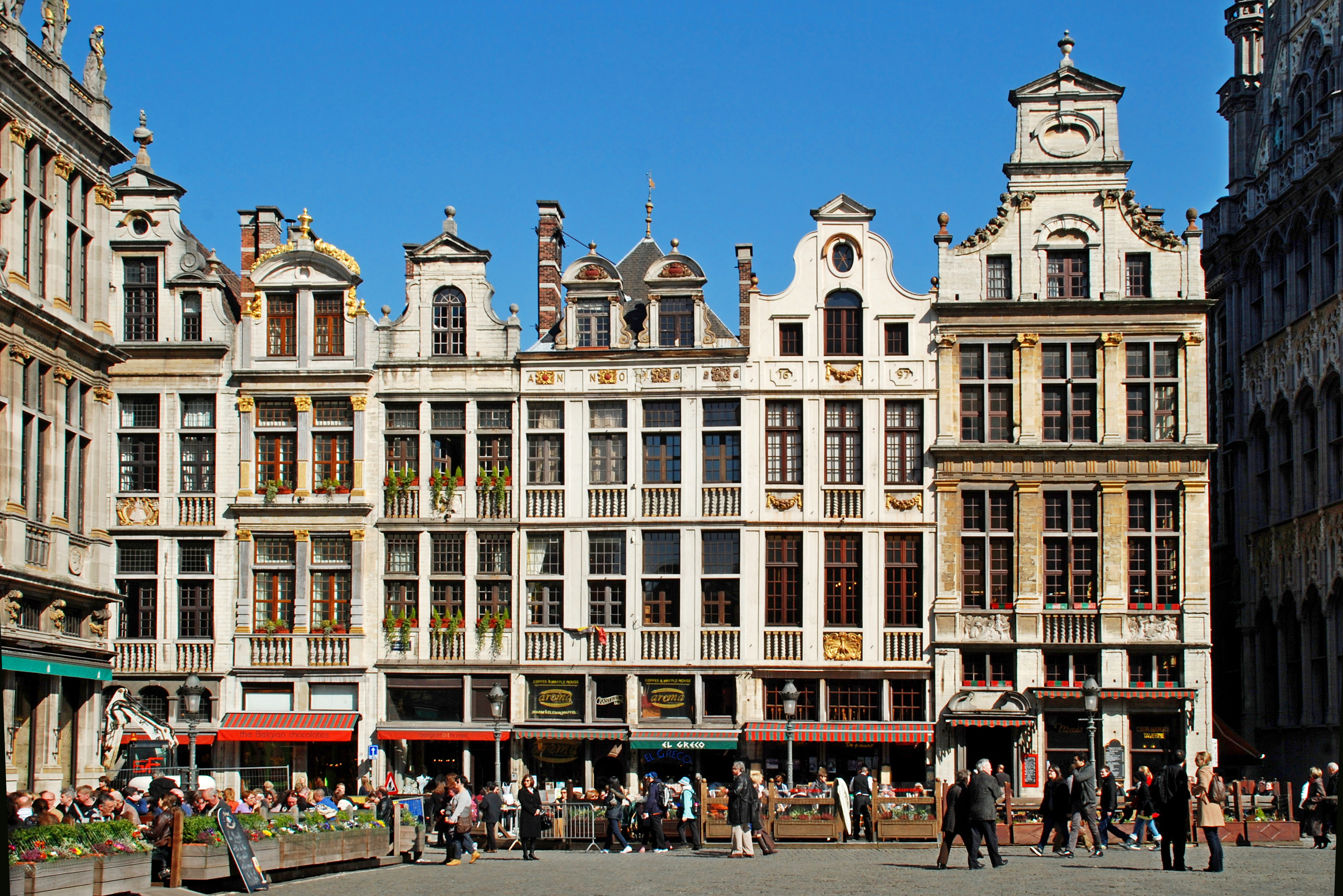
From right to left: Le Heaume, Le Paon, Le Petit Renard, Le Chêne, Sainte-Barbe and L'Âne

== Events ==
Festivities and cultural events are frequently organised on the Grand-Place, such as sound and light shows during the Christmas and New Year period as part of the "Winter Wonders", as well as concerts in the summer. Among the most important and famous are the Flower Carpet and the Ommegang, both taking place in the summer. The Belgian Beer Weekend, an event dedicated to Belgian beers, during which small and large breweries present their products at the Grand-Place, has taken place since 2010. The square has also been used for community gatherings and public celebrations, such as receiving athletes following sporting events.

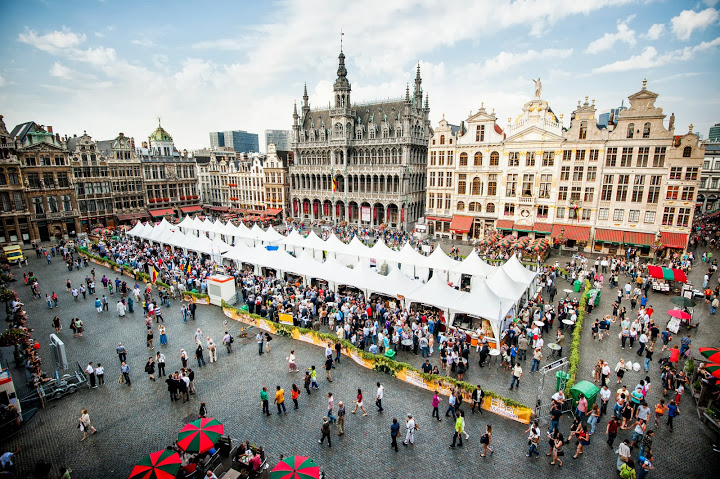
The Grand-Place on the day of the Belgian Beer Weekend

=== Flower carpet ===
Every two years in August, coordinating with Assumption Day, an enormous flower carpet is set up in the Grand-Place for three to four days. On this occasion, nearly a million colourful begonias or dahlias are set up in patterns forming a carpet-like tapestry, and the display covers a full 24 by 77 metres (79 by 253 ft), for area total of 1,800 m^{2} (19,000 sq ft). The first Flower Carpet was created in Brussels in 1971 by the Ghent landscape architect Etienne Stautemans in an effort to advertise his work, and due to its popularity, the tradition continued in subsequent years. Starting in 1986, the event has been regularly held biannually, each time under a different theme, with the Flower Carpet now estimated to attract between 150,000 and 200,000 local and international visitors.

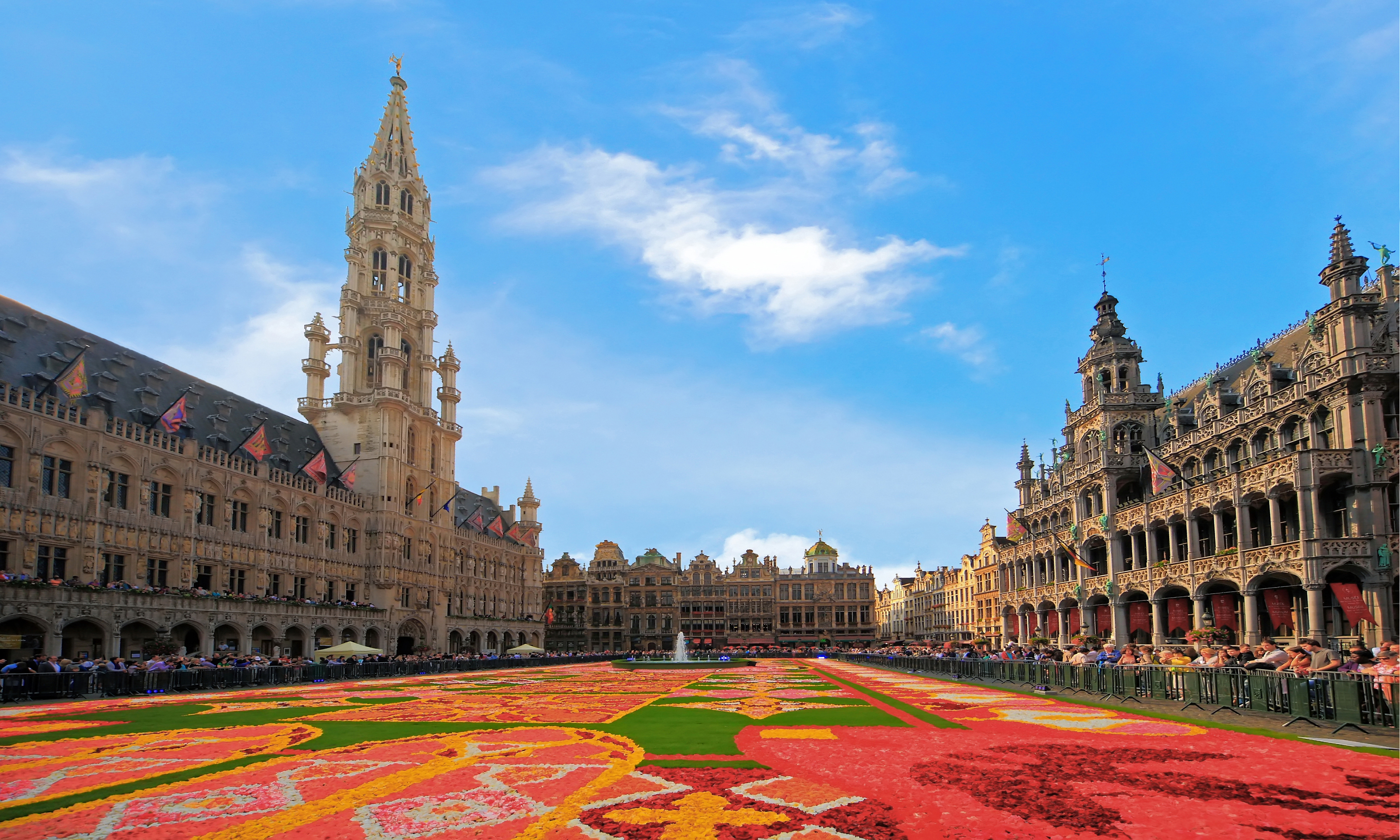
Flower Carpet at the Grand-Place

=== Ommegang of Brussels ===
Twice each year at the turn of June and July, the Ommegang of Brussels, a medieval pageant and folkloric costumed procession, concludes with a large spectacle at the Grand-Place. Historically Brussels' largest lustral procession, which took place once a year, on the Sunday before Pentecost, since 1930, it has taken the form of a historical reenactment of the Joyous Entry of Emperor Charles V and his son, Philip II, in the city in 1549. The colourful parade includes floats, traditional processional giants, such as Saint Michael and Saint Gudula, and scores of folkloric groups, either on foot or on horseback, dressed in medieval garb. Since 2019, it has been recognised as a Masterpiece of the Oral and Intangible Heritage of Humanity by UNESCO.

=== Christmas tree ===
Christmas and New Year celebrations have been held on the Grand-Place every year since 1952 or 1954. They have been officialised since 2000 as part of the "Winter Wonders" in the city centre. A Christmas tree is erected on the square for the occasion and is decorated with lights that are switched on at a seasonal ceremony, whilst the square's façades are illuminated by a sound and light show. These festivities usually take place from the end of November until the beginning of January and attract a large number of people.

== Gallery ==
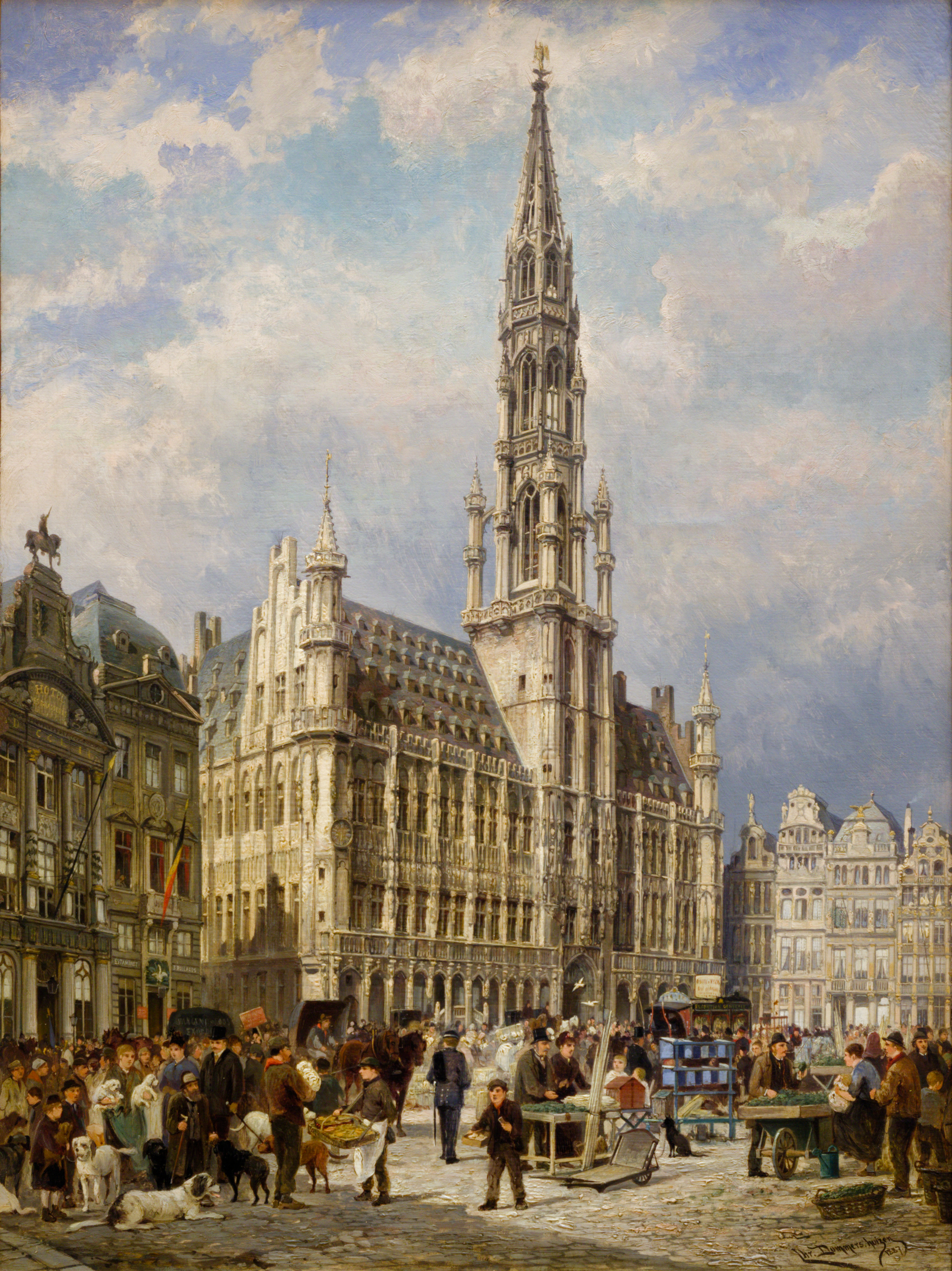
The Grand-Place in 1887 by Cornelis Christiaan Dommersen

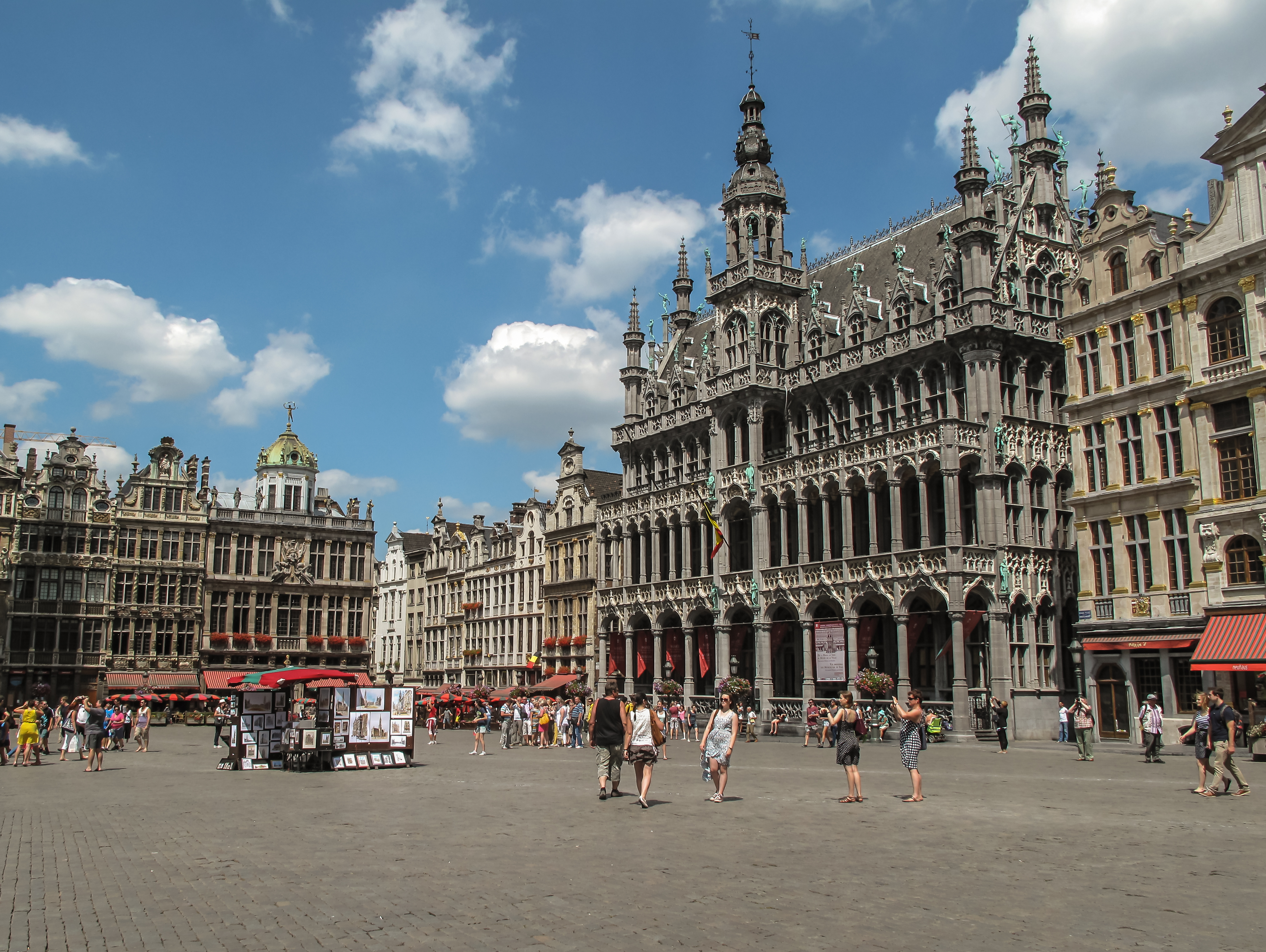
The Grand-Place, towards the King's House

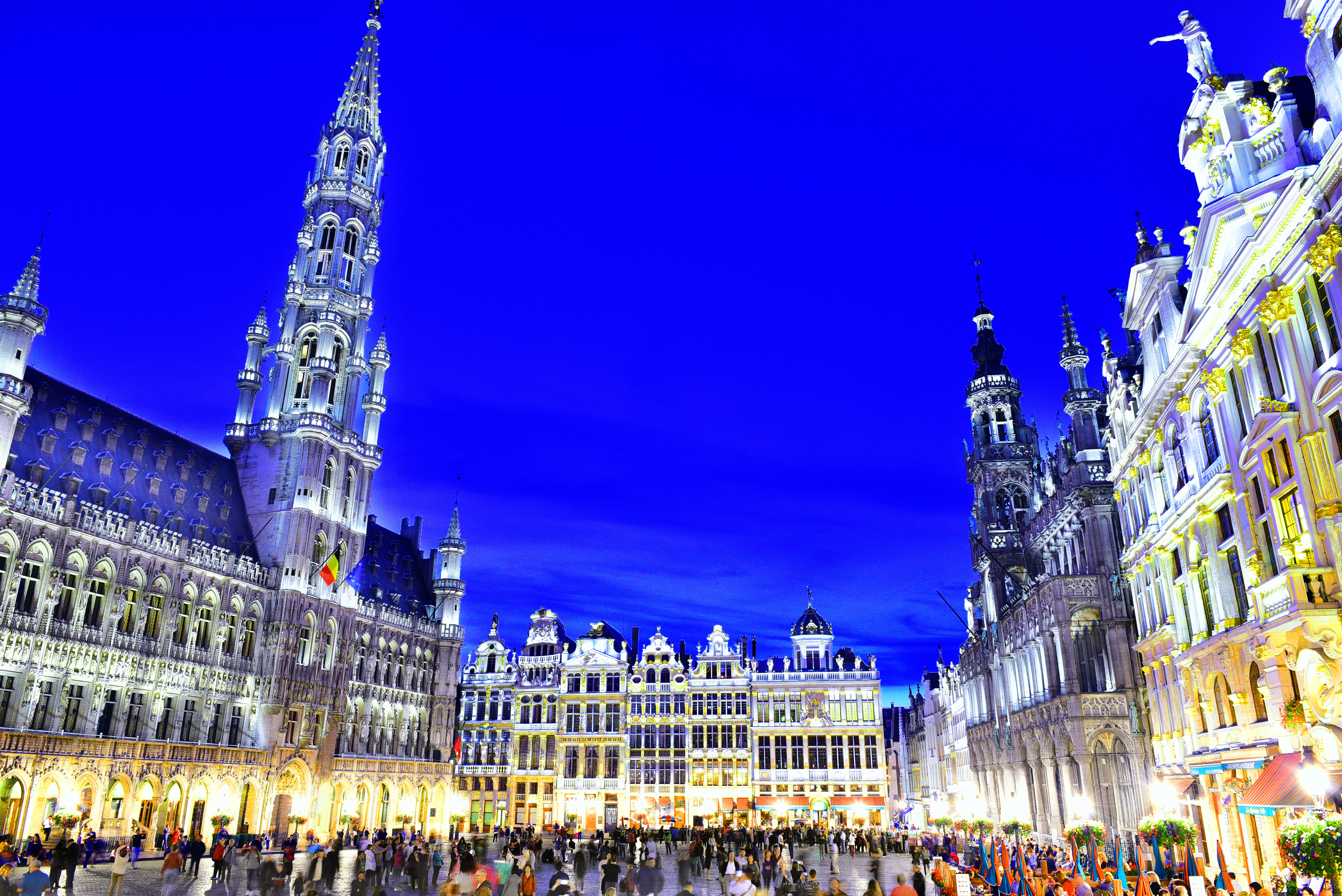
The Grand-Place during the blue hour

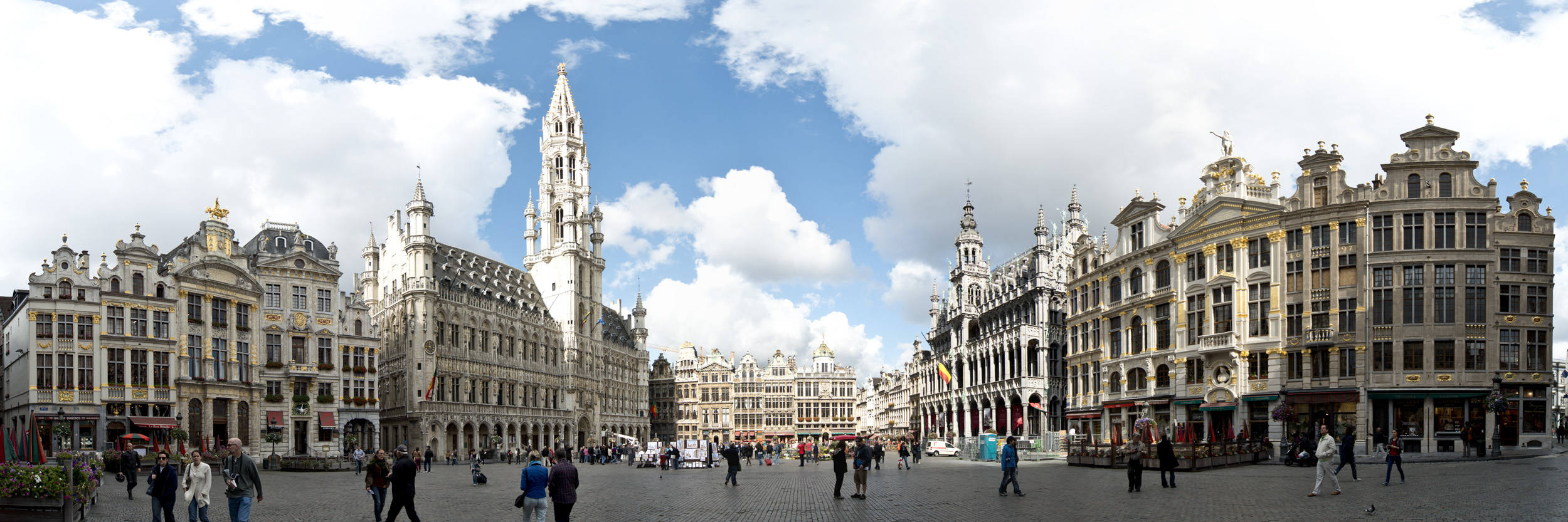
Panoramic view

== See also ==
- Peter van Dievoet (sculptor and architect)
- History of Brussels
- Culture of Belgium
- Belgium in the long nineteenth century
