= Brussels Christmas tree =

Public Christmas tree in Brussels, Belgium

Coordinates: 50°50′48″N 4°21′9″E

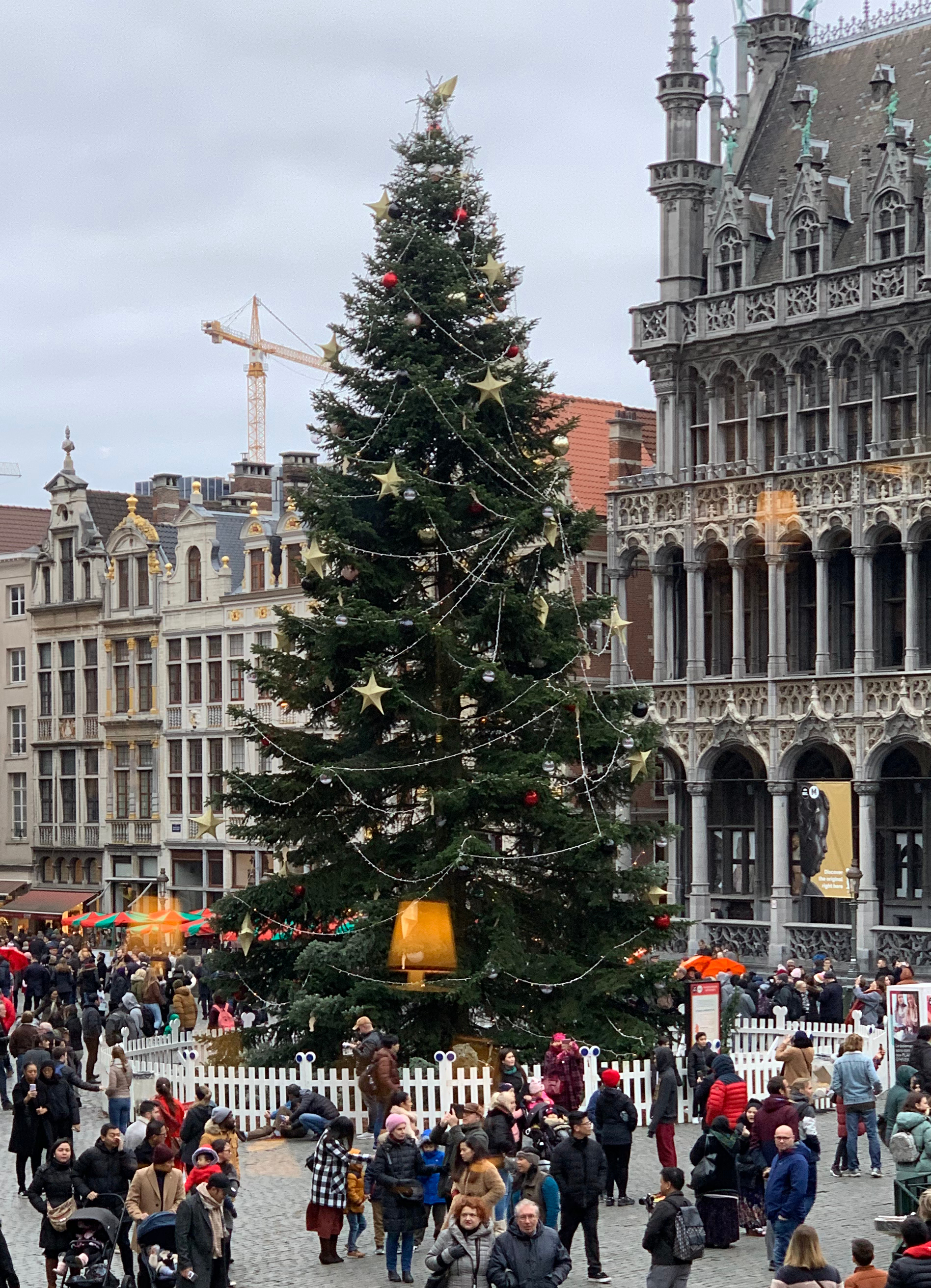
The Christmas tree on the Grand-Place/Grote Markt in 2019

The Brussels Christmas tree (French: Sapin de Noël de Bruxelles; Dutch: Kerstboom van Brussel) is a Christmas tree erected annually on the Grand-Place/Grote Markt (main square) of Brussels, Belgium. It has traditionally been a real tree either from the Ardennes forest, from the city of Helsinki or from different countries as diplomatic gift, except in 2012 when it was replaced with an abstract sculpture.

== Traditional trees ==
Traditionally, the Grand-Place/Grote Markt in the centre of Brussels hosts a real Christmas tree each year, taken from the Ardennes forest. The normal height for these trees is around 20 metres (66 ft) high. The Grand-Place itself dates from the Middle Ages (though most of the buildings around the square date from the 17th century and were rebuilt during subsequent years), and it has played host to a Christmas market each year since 2000.

== 2012 tree ==
On 30 November 2012, a 25-metre-high (82 ft) abstract-style tree was erected on the Grand-Place instead of a usual real Christmas tree. It was designed to work with an overall theme of light installations on the Grand-Place, and allowed visitors to climb to the top of the "tree". It was constructed out of steel-framed boxes, wood and screening materials. It cost €40,000 ($52,000) to construct, which was described as about a third of the price of a real tree.

The Belgian press reacted negatively to the installation of the tree, with some suggesting that it was erected to avoid offending Muslims. Brussels city councillor Bianca Debaets concurred with this sentiment, and also pointed out that it marked a change of name for the annual Christmas market to "Winter Wonders". Fellow councillor Philippe Close responded to that criticism by saying, "What we want is just to modernise the pleasure of winter, of this Christmas market and all the image of Brussels. The Christmas tree is not a religious symbol and actually lots of Muslims have a Christmas tree at home." By 1 December, an online petition against the installation had received 11,000 signatures. By 11 December, this had increased to 25,000.

Due to concerns over vandalism during New Year's celebrations on the Grand-Place, it was announced in early December that the tree would be taken down on 28 December, instead of early January, as was the case with the real trees in the past.

== See also ==
- Tree, a controversial abstract Christmas tree in Paris
- History of Brussels
- Culture of Belgium
