= Church of St. Nicholas, Brussels =

Church in Brussels, Belgium

Church of St. Nicholas
- Église Saint-Nicolas (French); Sint-Niklaaskerk (Dutch)
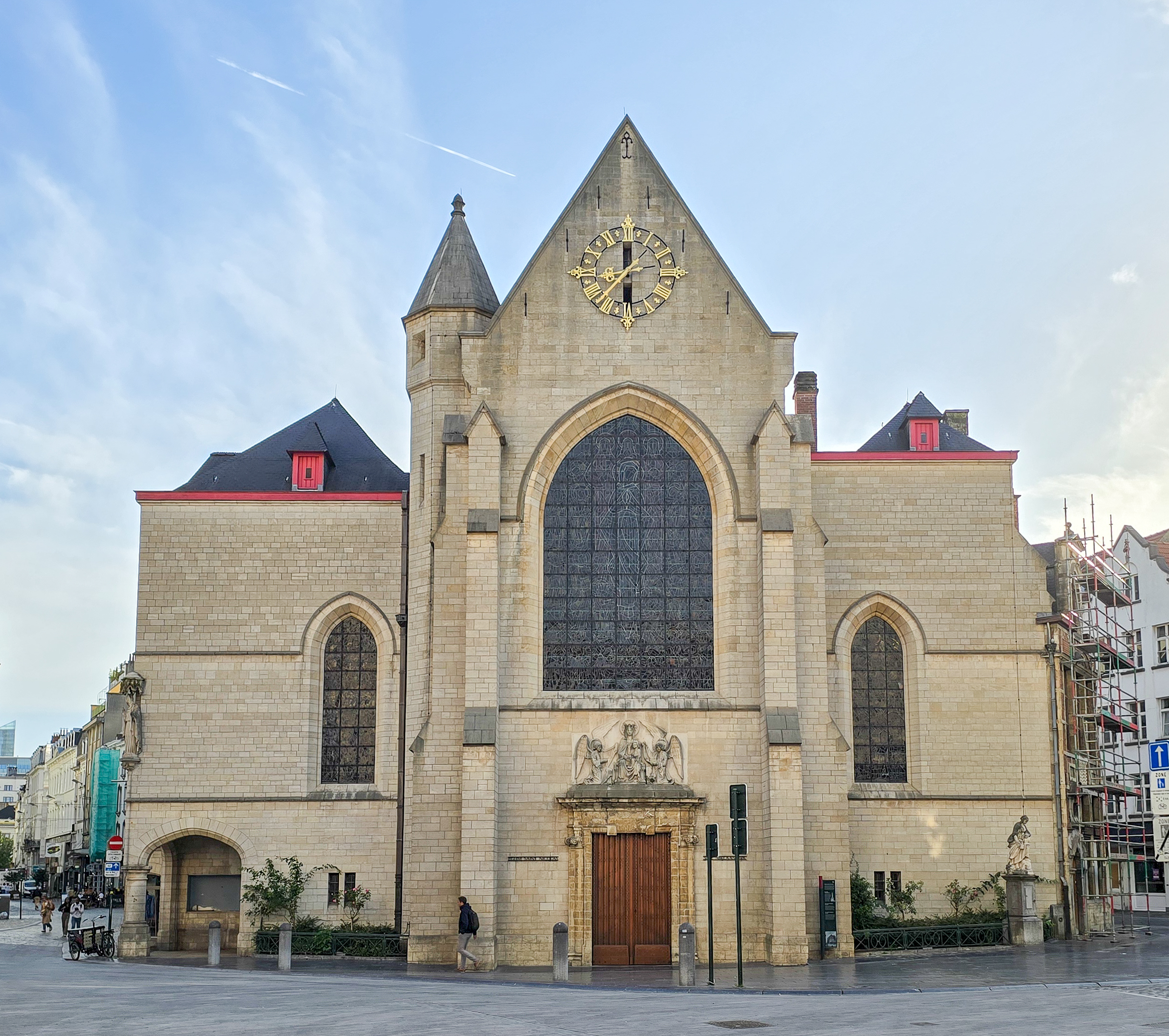
- Church of St. Nicholas
- 50°50′52″N 4°21′06″E
- Location: Rue au Beurre / Boterstraat; 1000 City of Brussels, Brussels-Capital Region
- Country: Belgium
- Denomination: Catholic Church

History
- Dedication: Saint Nicholas

Architecture
- Functional status: Active
- Heritage designation: Protected
- Designated: 05/03/1936
- Architectural type: Church

Administration
- Archdiocese: Mechelen–Brussels

Clergy
- Archbishop: Luc Terlinden (Primate of Belgium)

The Church of St. Nicholas (French: Église Saint-Nicolas; Dutch: Sint-Niklaaskerk) is a Catholic church in central Brussels, Belgium. Founded around 1125, it is one of the first four churches in Brussels and the best preserved in its successive developments. It is dedicated to Saint Nicholas.

The church was designated a historic monument on 5 March 1936. Its western (main) façade dates from the 1950s.

== Description ==
=== Exterior ===
To the west, the church has a tripartite façade, built in Massangis stone by the architect J. Rombaux in 1956, and supported by powerful buttresses with stepped slopes and saddlebacks. This façade is pierced in its centre by a classicist-style portal flanked on either side by flat, rounded pilasters whose Ionic capitals support an entablature comprising a high, undecorated architrave and a projecting cornice. The cornice is surmounted by a bas-relief sculpted by J. Lacroix in 1956 depicting a Madonna and Child (Sedes Sapientiae) surrounded by two angels. The angel on the left is playing the harp and the one on the right is handling a censer. The portal is surmounted by an immense Gothic-style stained glass window and a large gilded clock, carried by the gable.

The side façades are pierced with large ogival bays and are supported by stepped buttresses, without saddlebacks, unlike the western façade. These façades are partially obscured by small houses leaning against the church, including the De Goude Huyve house in Baroque style. The arms of the transept do not extend beyond the plane of the side façades: only the northern arm (Rue de Tabora/Taborastraat) has a triangular gable.

The crossing of the transept is topped by a square bell tower with louvres that ends in a small bulb bearing a golden ball, a wrought iron cross and a rooster.

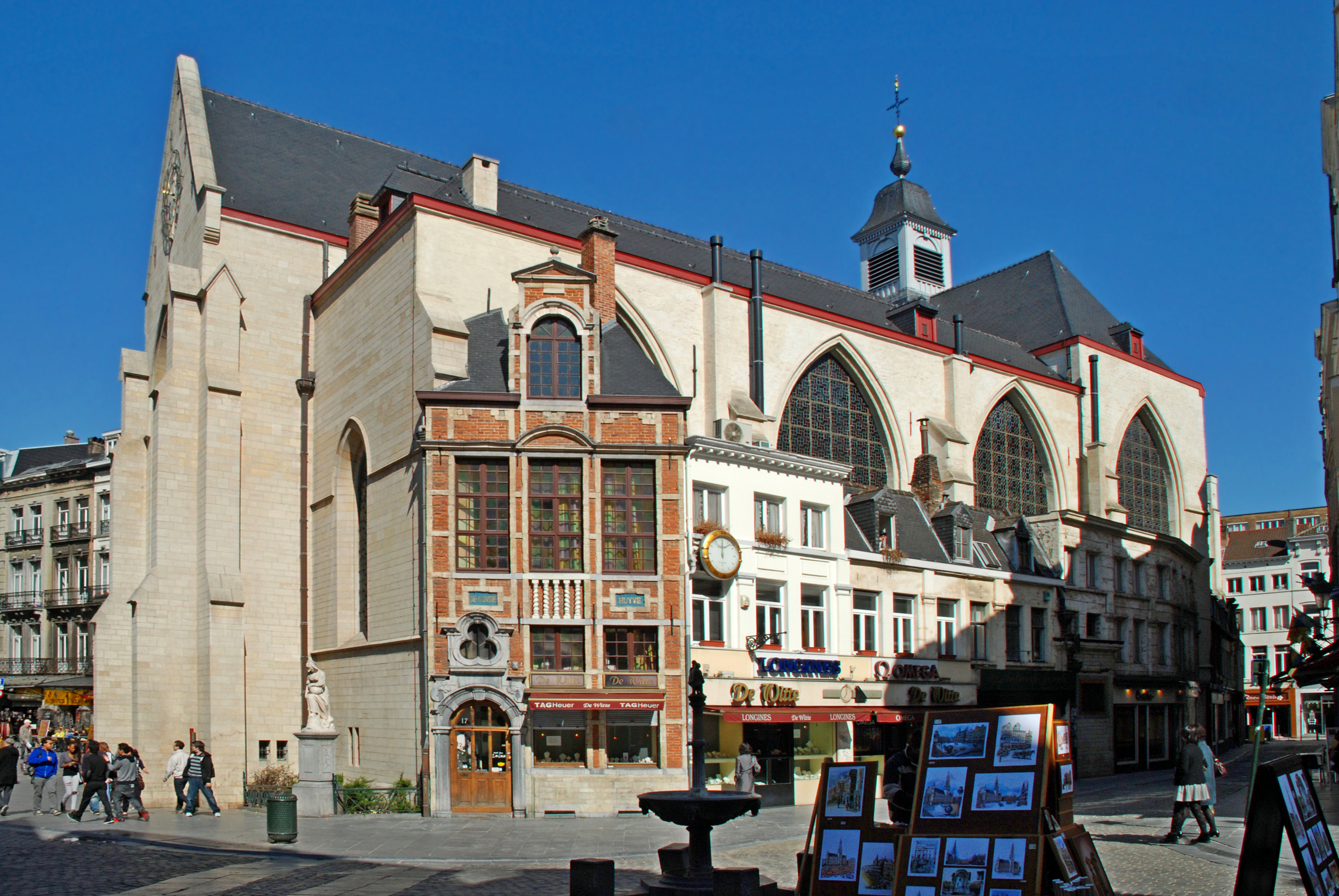
The Church of St. Nicholas and the small houses leaning against its side façade

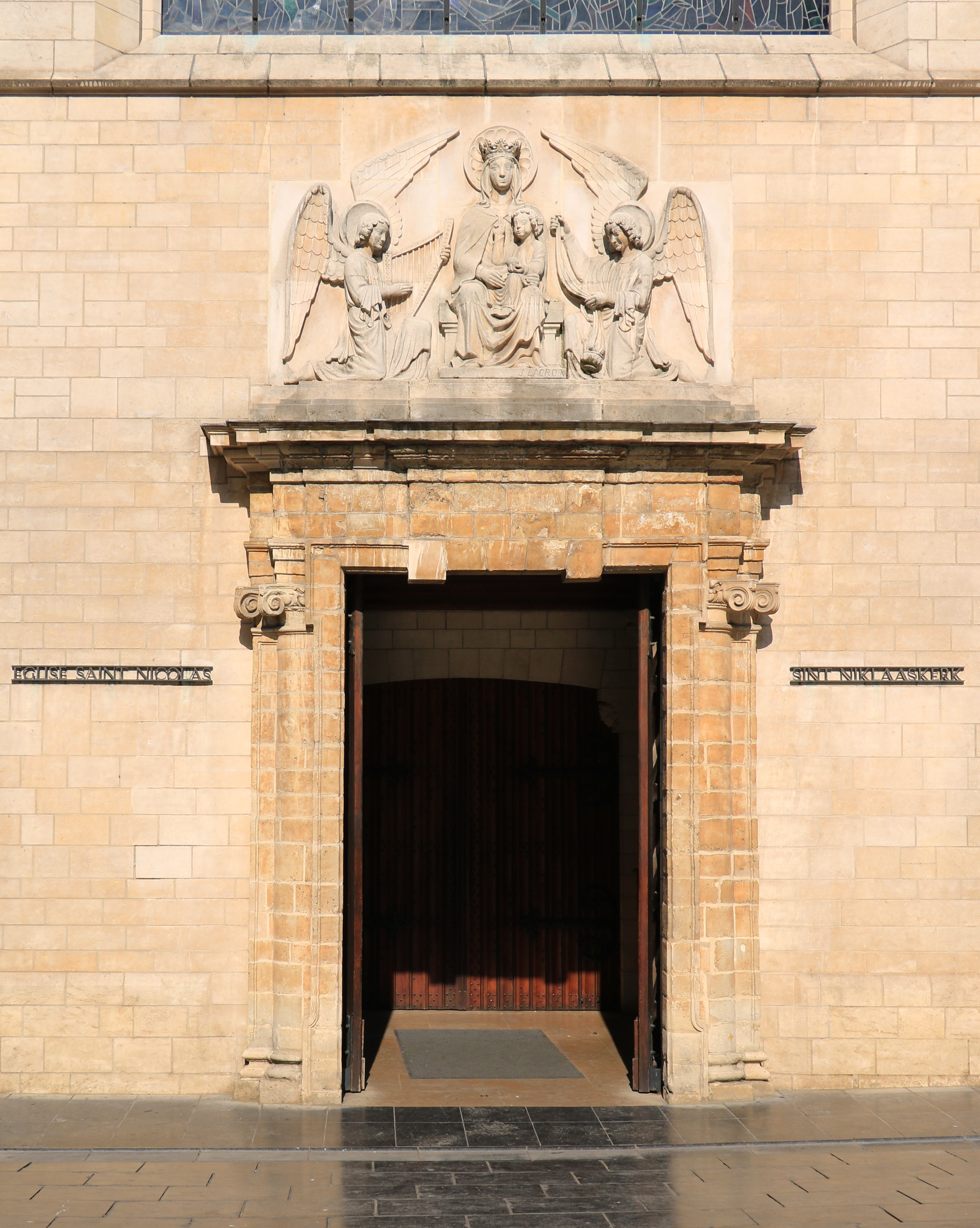
The main portal

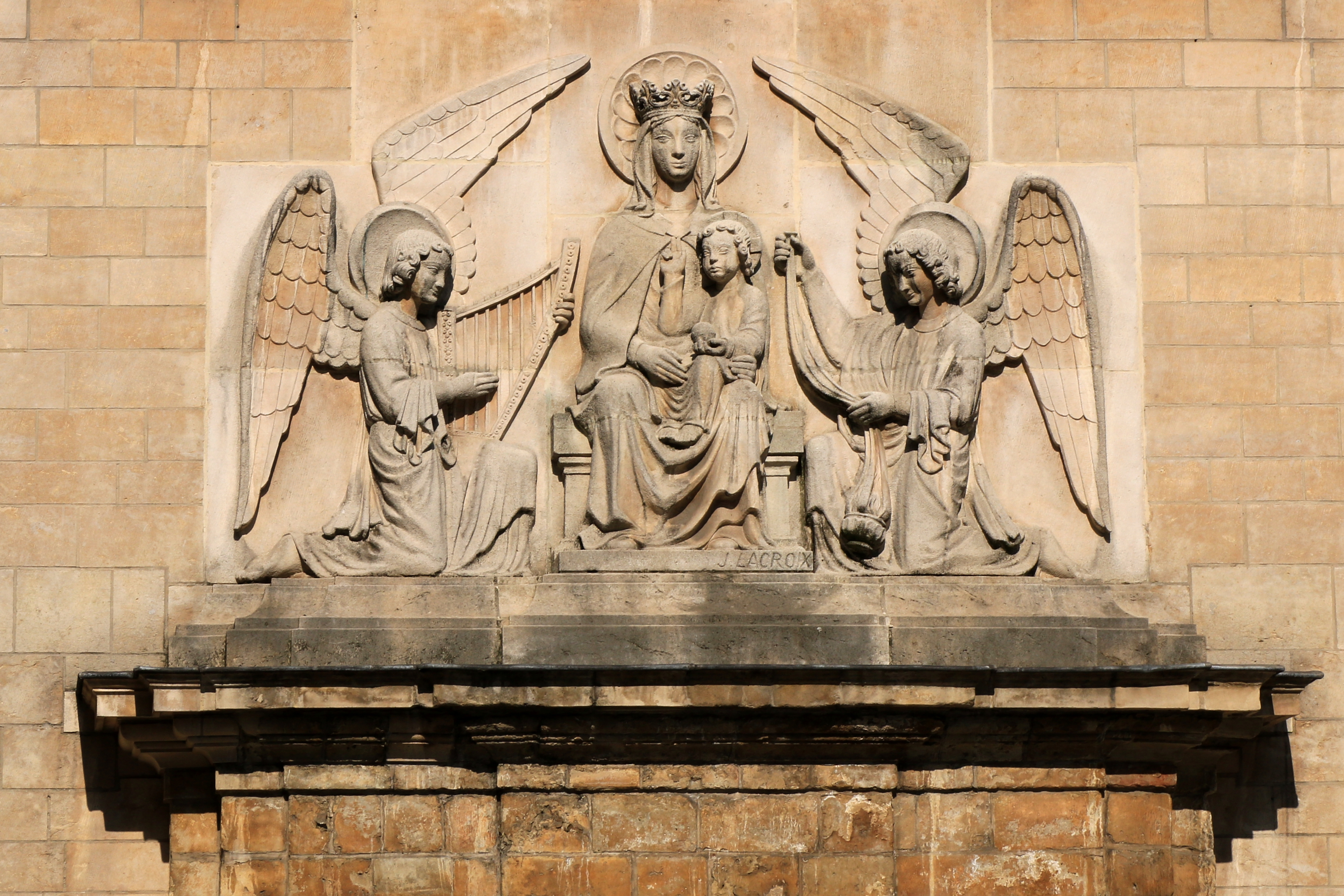
Bas-relief above the portal: Madonna and Child (Sedes Sapientiae)

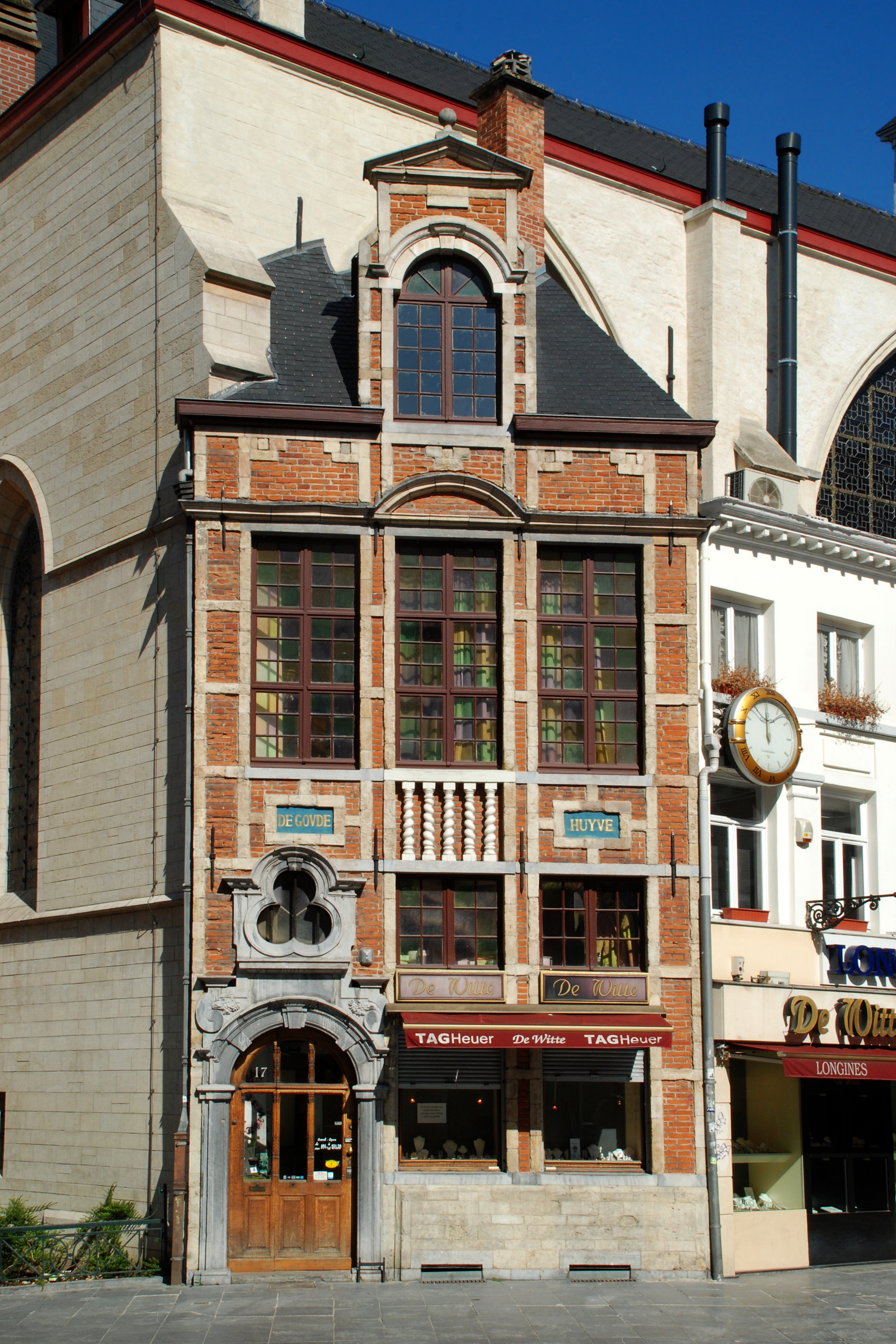
De Goude Huyve house

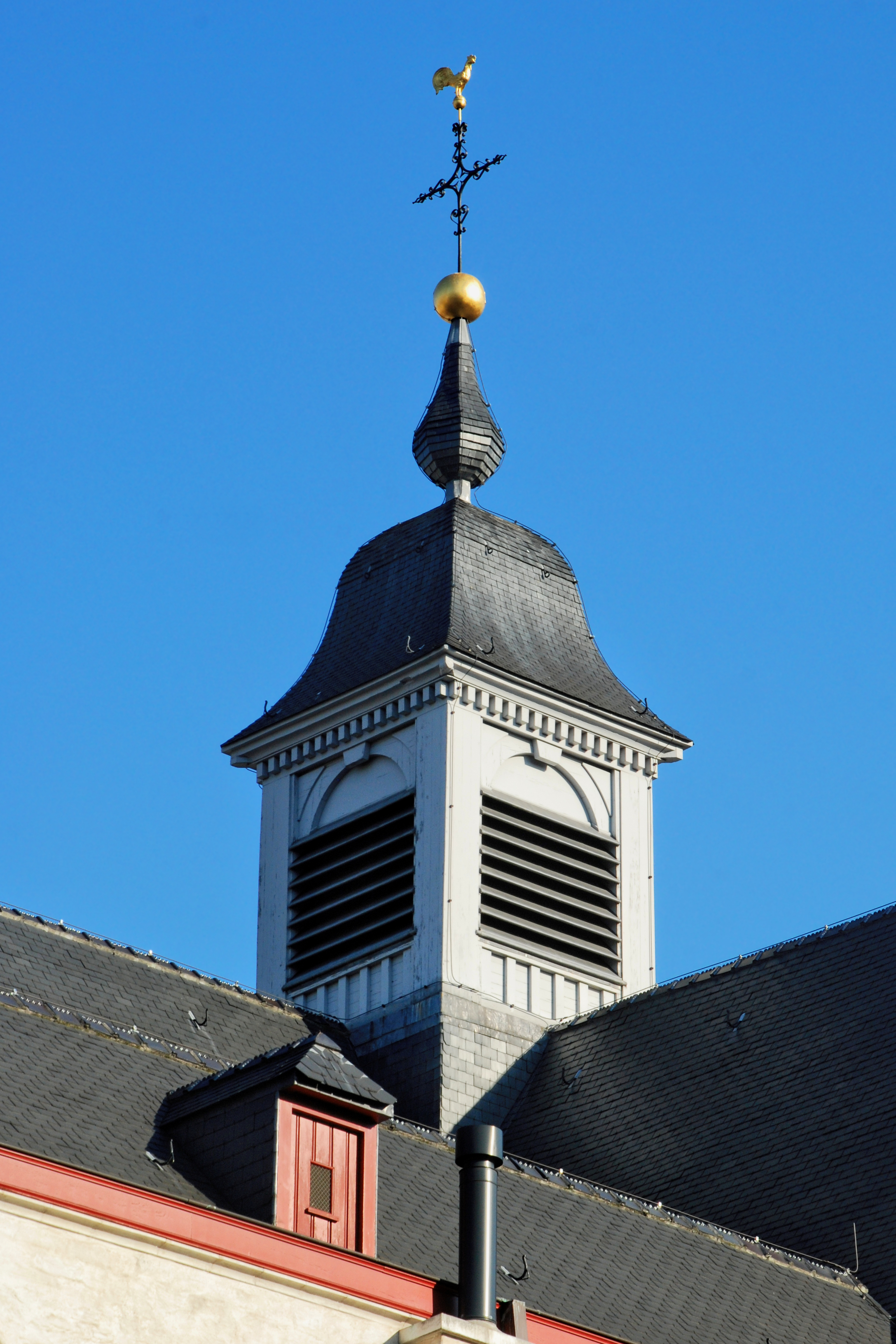
Bulbous bell tower

=== Interior ===
Inside, the church's walls, pillars and ribbed vaults are coated and painted white. To the west, the rear of the church is occupied by an imposing rood screen supported by uncoated blue stone columns, each ending in a Corinthian capital. To the east, the choir, completely off-centre, has a central five-sided apse flanked by a single apsidiole on the left.

A cannonball, dating from the bombardment of Brussels by the French troops in August 1695, is lodged at the top of a pillar of the nave.

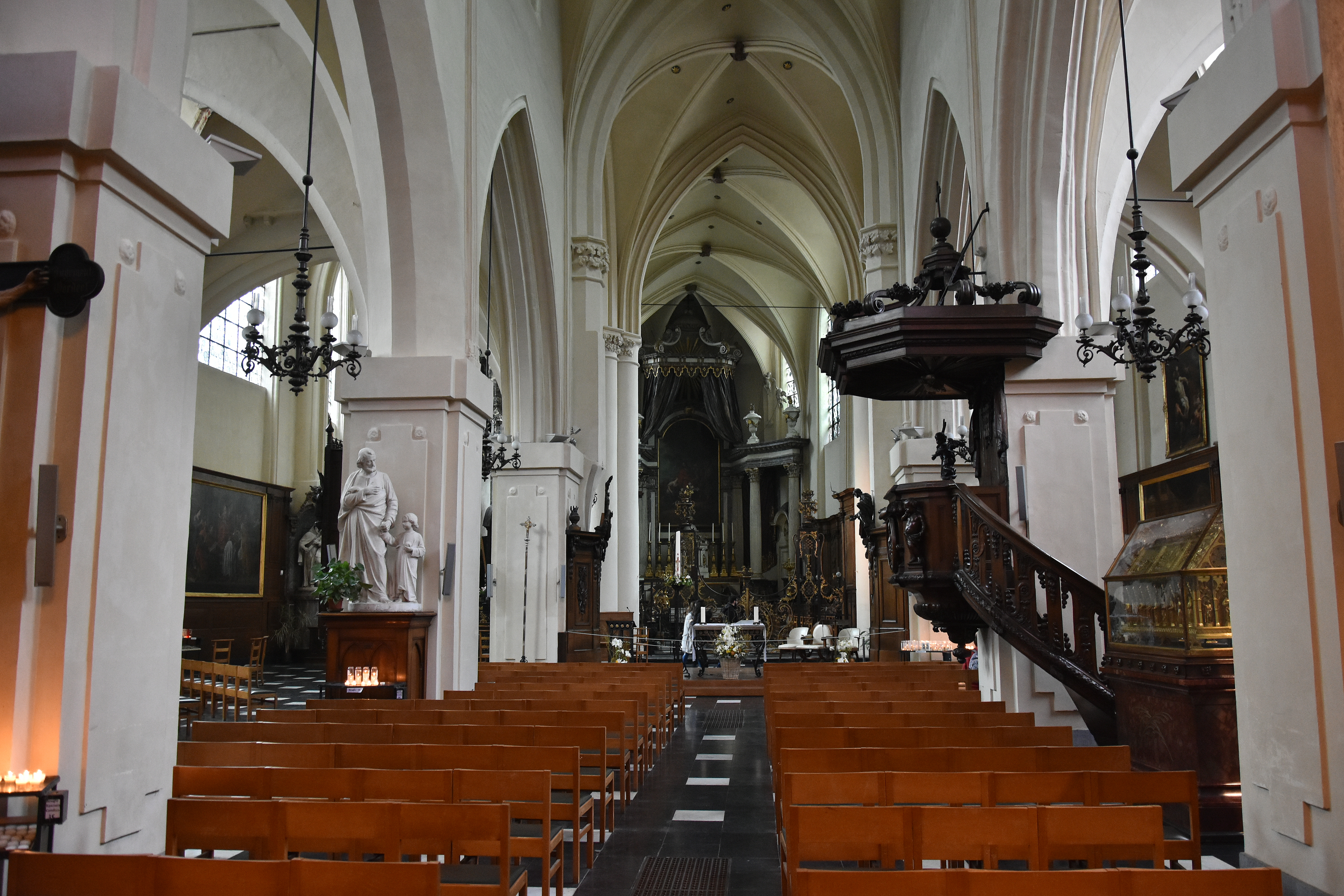
The nave

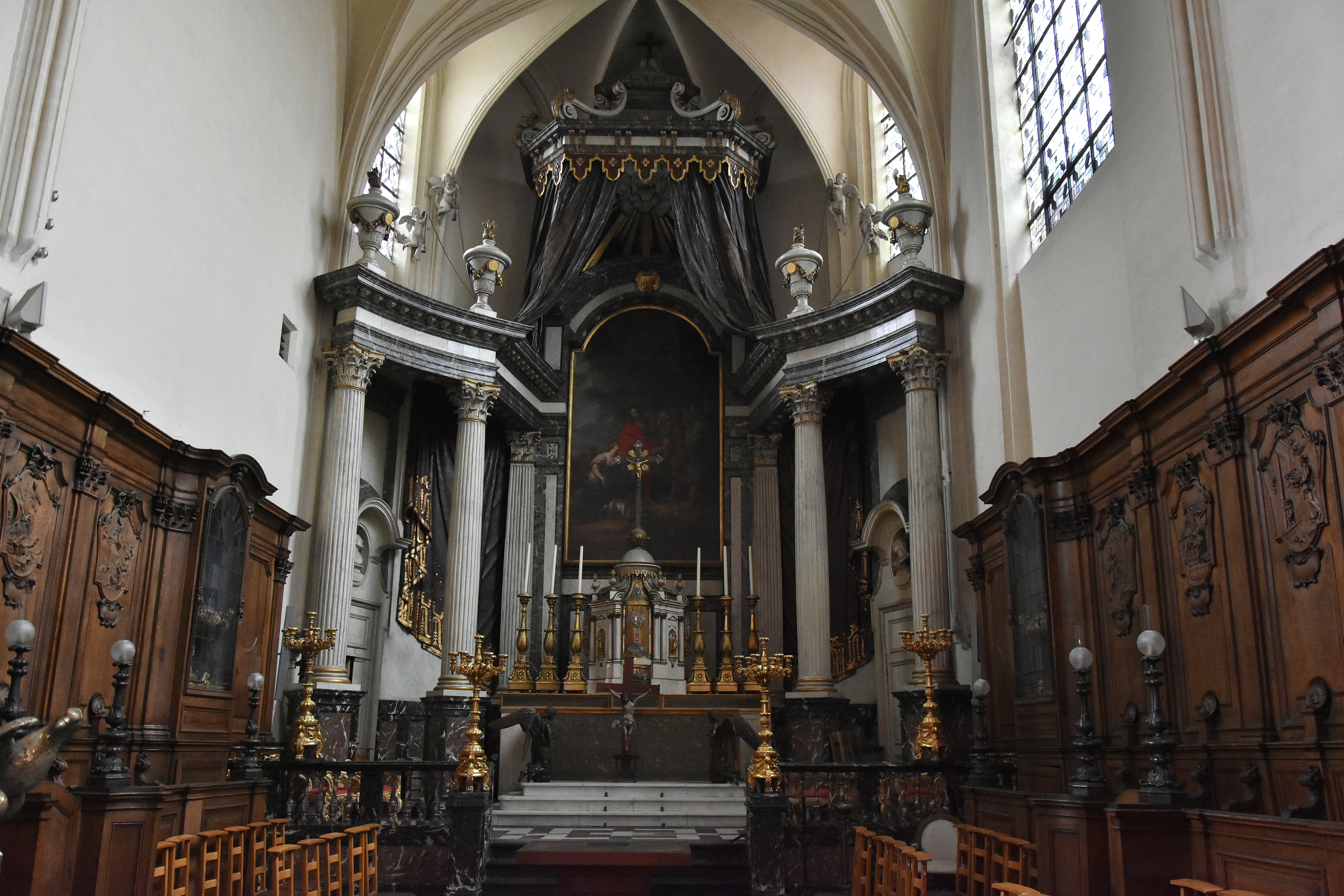
The choir

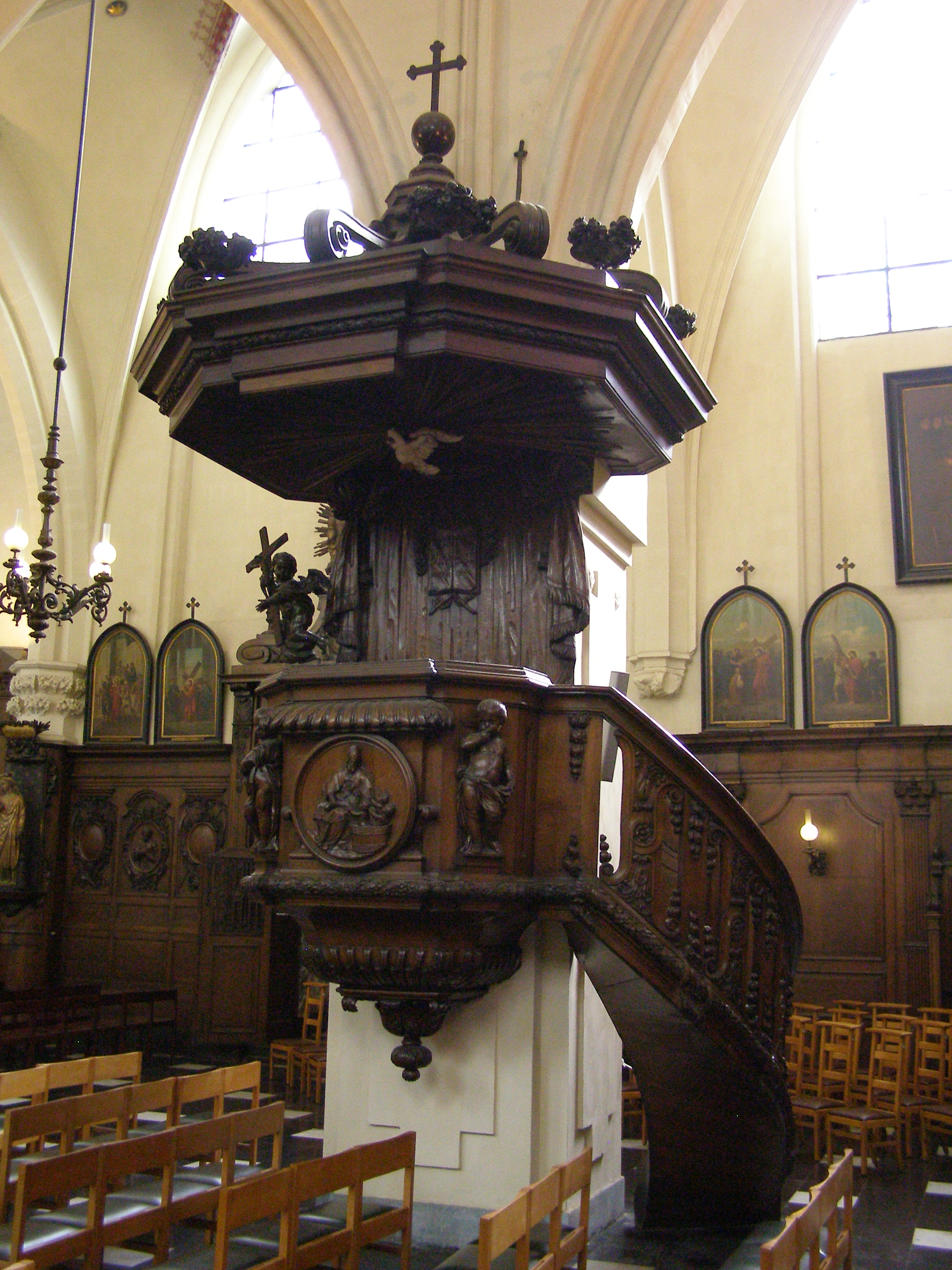
Pulpit

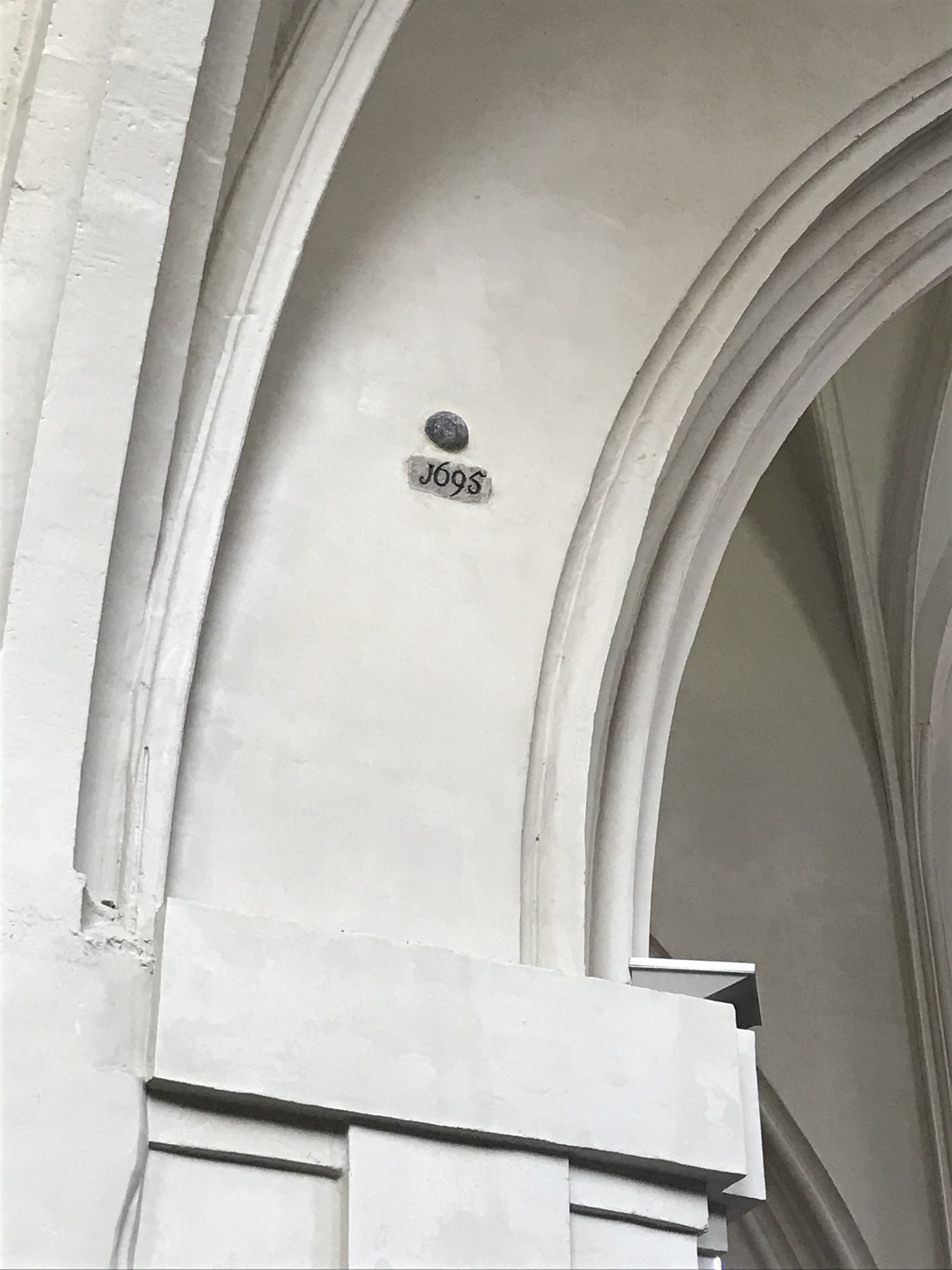
Cannonball from the bombardment of Brussels in 1695

== See also ==
- List of churches in Brussels
- Catholic Church in Belgium
- History of Brussels
- Culture of Belgium
