= Makelaers Comptoir =

Coordinates: 52°22′31″N 4°53′33″E

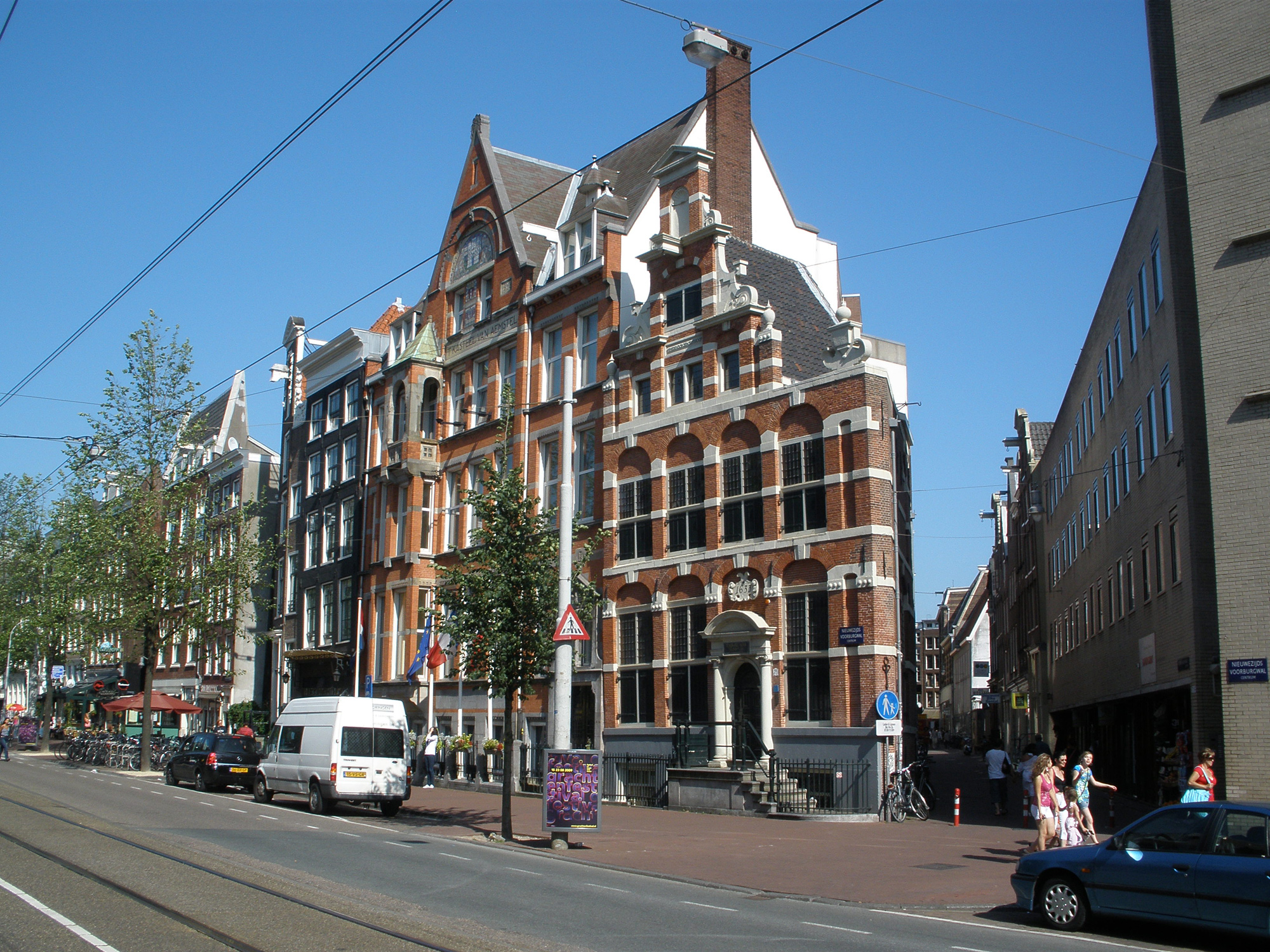
Makelaers Comptoir

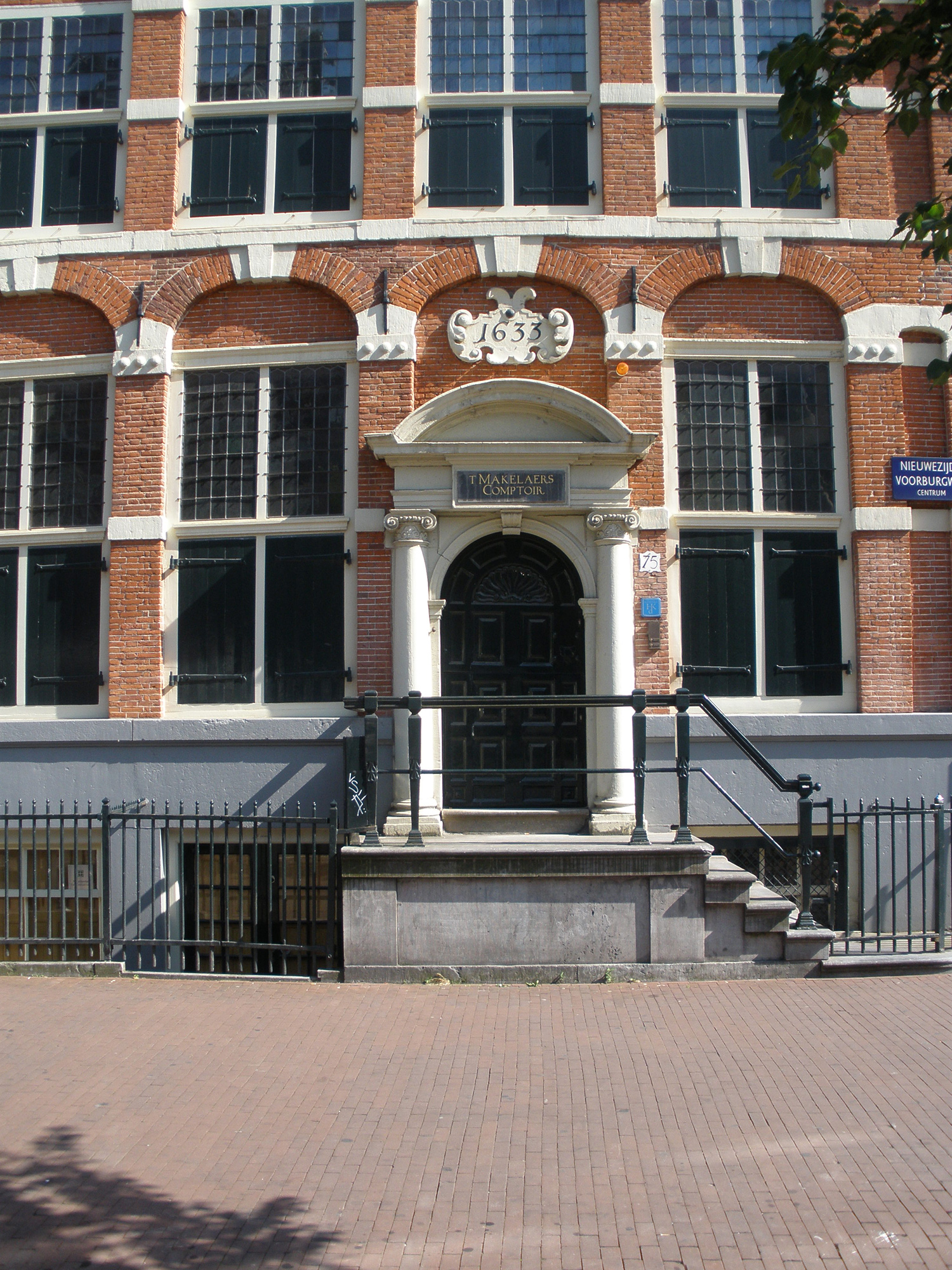
Entrance

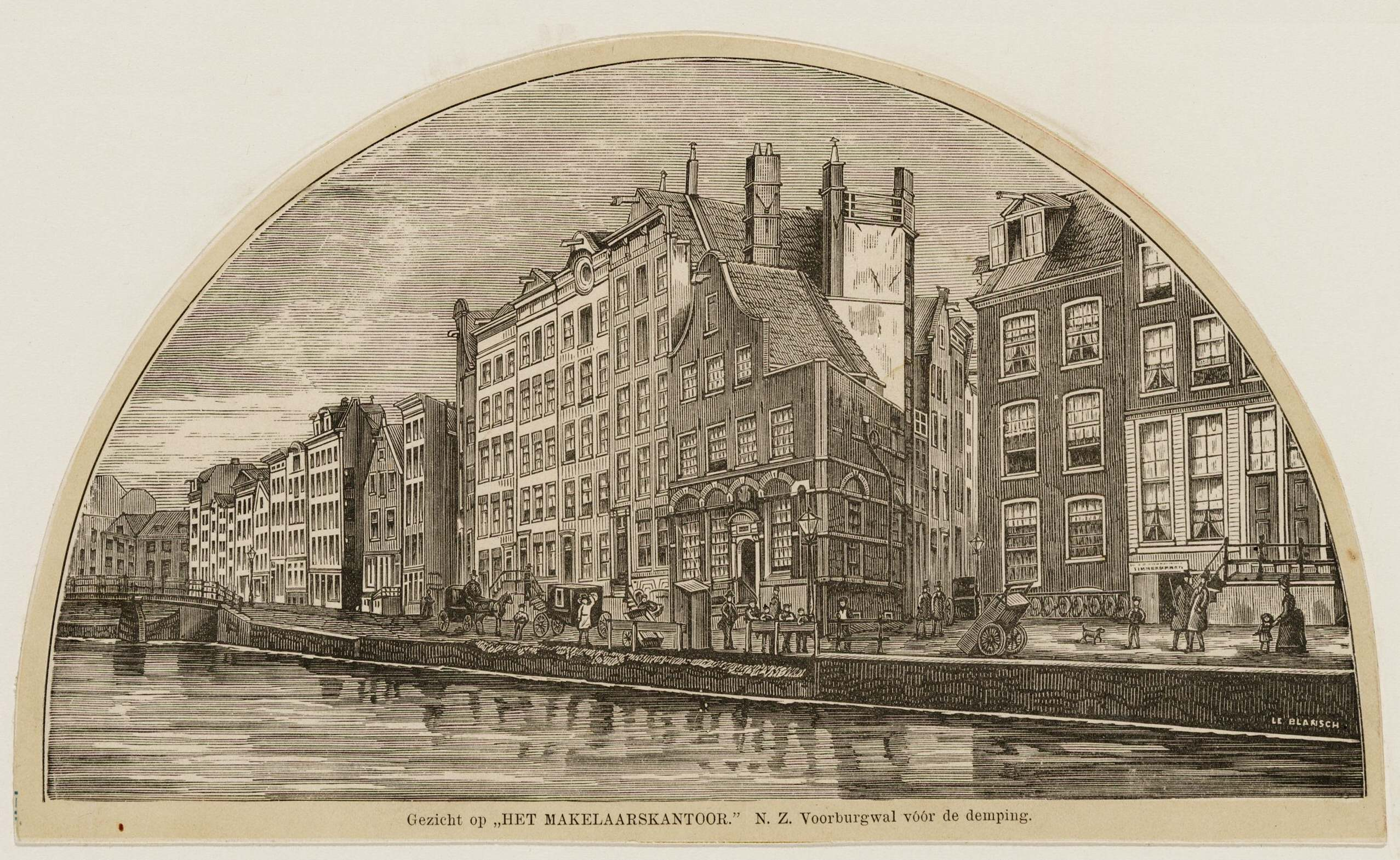
The Makelaers Comptoir in the 19th century. Note the clock gable and the canal, which had not been filled in yet

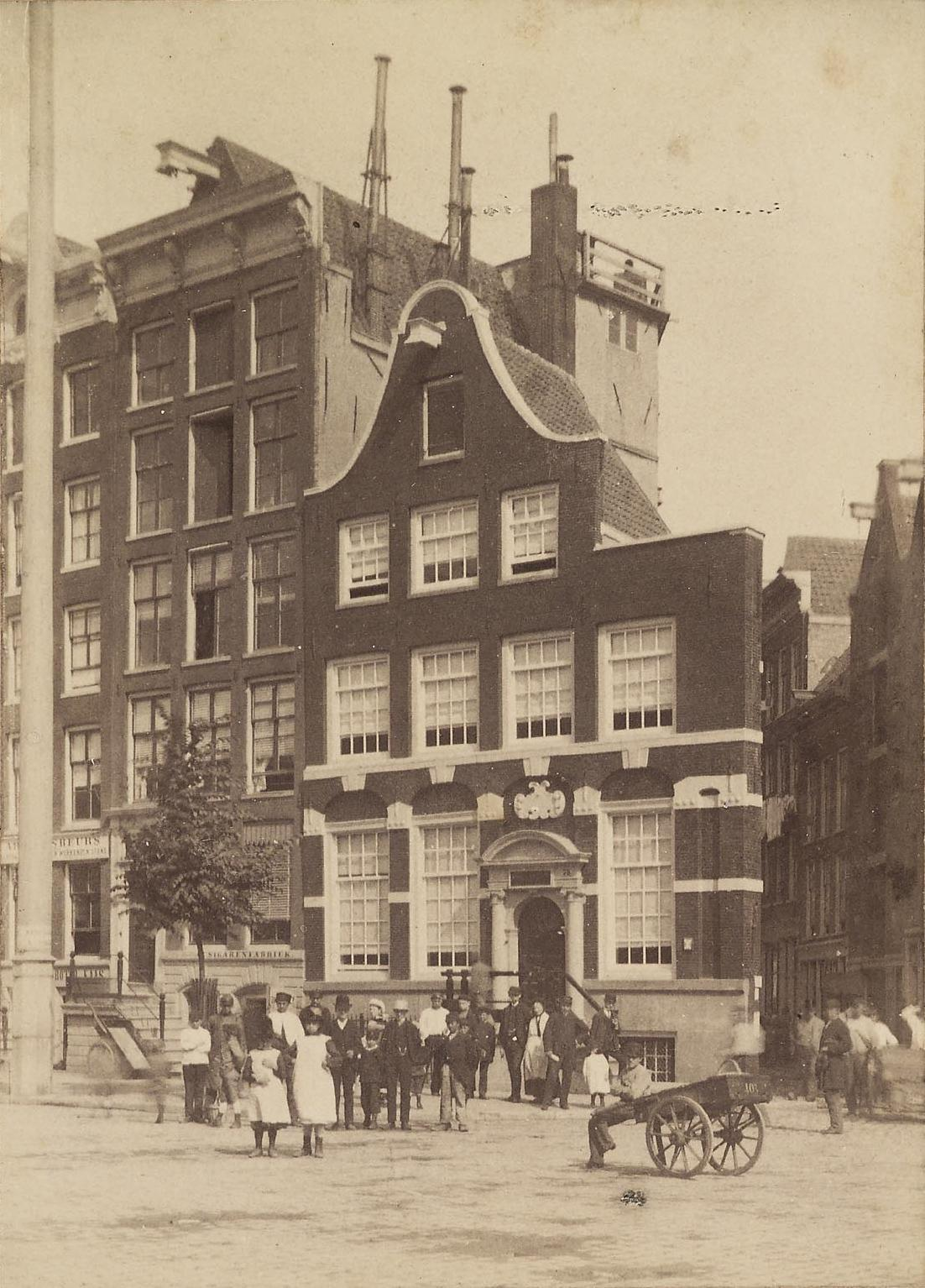
The Makelaers Comptoir, photo taken between 1884 and 1903, shortly after the canal was filled in. Note the clock gable.

The Makelaers Comptoir or (in modern Dutch spelling) Makelaarskantoor, the "brokers' office", is a 17th-century guildhall in Amsterdam, at the corner of Nieuwezijds Voorburgwal and the alley Nieuwe Nieuwstraat. It is one of the few remaining guildhalls in Amsterdam.

The building has held rijksmonument status since 1970. It is not open to the public, but is rented out occasionally for small events such as meetings, lunches and dinners. In 2009 the building was opened to the public during Open Monumentdag.

== History ==
The Makelaers Comptoir was constructed in 1633-1634 to serve as a guildhall for the brokers' guild. These brokers served as intermediaries between buyers and sellers trading in coffee, tobacco, grain and other goods that were brought to Amsterdam from all corners of the world during the Dutch Golden Age.

The brokers' guild was founded in 1612 and had its headquarters in the former home of a spice trader called Hendrick Opmeer. About a year later, in 1614, the guild decided to tear down the house and replace it with a new building in the same location. Construction started on 5 March 1633, and on 1 November 1634 the building was complete.

The Makelaers Comptoir was built in the Amsterdam Renaissance style, which was very popular at the time. The architect was probably the carpenter Peter Mychielsen. The two-floor building had a red brick facade with blocks of natural stone. The stepped gable was richly decorated with ornate side-pieces (klauwstukken), scrollwork and decorative vases.

The front entrance is framed by a pediment-shaped gate with two Ionic pilasters. The cartouche above the gate reads "1633", the year construction on the building started.

In 1739, 1836 en 1937, the building underwent renovations. During the 1836 renovation, the stepped gable was replaced with a clock gable and oil was applied to the facade, changing the red brick to a dark brown colour. In 1937, however, the original situation was restored, although the Latin inscription Soli Deo Gloria over the front door was replaced with Vrijheid is voor geen geld te koop ("liberty is not for sale at any price").

In 2002, the building was sold to the historic preservation society Vereniging Hendrick de Keyser at the symbolic price of 1 euro. Restoration of the building followed during the period 2003-2004.

== Interior ==
The interior is well preserved because the building never had any other owner than the brokers' guild. The voorhuis (front part of the house), with its checkered black-and-white marble floor, is considered the best-preserved in Amsterdam. The 18th-century fireplace in the guild director's chamber has been preserved, with a mantelpiece dating to 1760. The fireplace also features a painting by Philips Vingboons showing the Amsterdam bourse, the Koopmansbeurs. The walls are decorated with the coat-of-arms of guild directors.

An image of a rose was carved out and gilded on one of the ceiling beams in the voorhuis. The rose, symbolizing confidentiality and discretion, indicated that everything discussed in the room was below remained sub rosa (confidential).

A number of brokers' staffs are still present in the Makelaers Comptoir. These staffs, bearing the city's coat of arms, were carried by brokers as a form of identification.

== Sources ==
- Gemeente Amsterdam, Bureau Monumenten & Archeologie (Dutch)
- Vereniging Hendrick de Keyser (Dutch)
- "'t Makelaers Comptoir" (in Dutch). De Echo. 10 June 2009.
