= Gilles Van den Eynde =

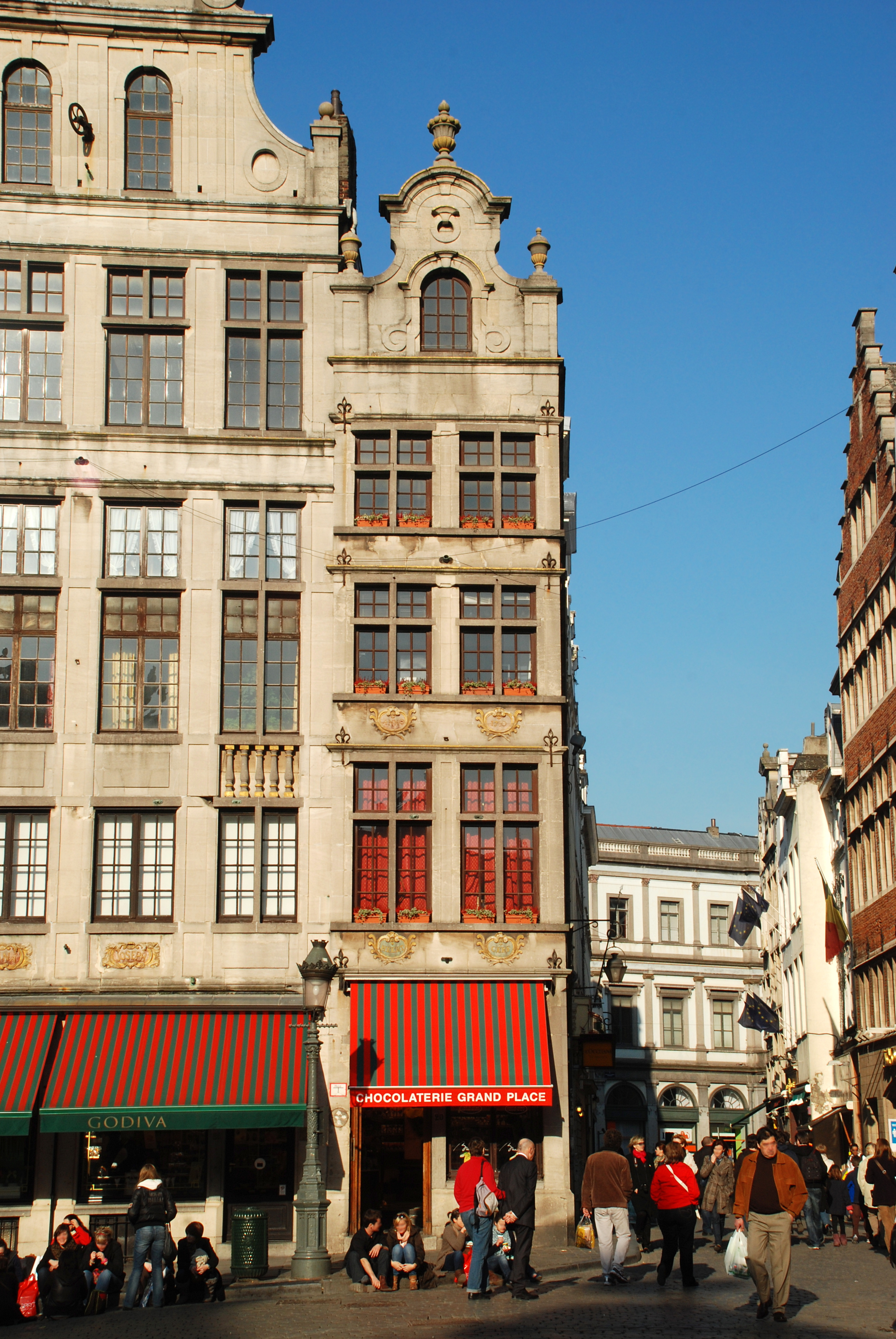
Le Cerf on the Grote Markt, Brussels

Gilles van den Eynde (died November 1723) was a stonemason, architect, and an important member of the Corporation des Quatre Couronnés in Brussels. Van den Eynde was also a councilor of the City of Brussels until his death. By 8 November 1723 he was replaced by sculptor Peter Van Dievoet.

He contributed to the reconstruction of the Grand-Place in Brussels (then part of the Spanish Netherlands) in 1695.

He was the owner of Le Cerf (Dutch: Het Hert, literally "the stag"), on the Grand-Place, the design of which the archivist Guillaume Des Marez also attributes to him. By 1710, the late Baroque facade of this building was completed.

Following the disturbances which occurred in Brussels in May 1700, Gilles Van den Eynde was condemned, with eleven other bourgeois, to exile by the decision of the Council of Brabant of 28 May 1700, which also condemned to death two bourgeois, Arnould t' Kint, brewer, and Marc Duvivier, goldsmith. However, they were granted amnesty a few days later by a letter of amnesty from the king conveyed by the Marquis de Bedmar.
