= Guildhall =

Building used for meetings of guild members

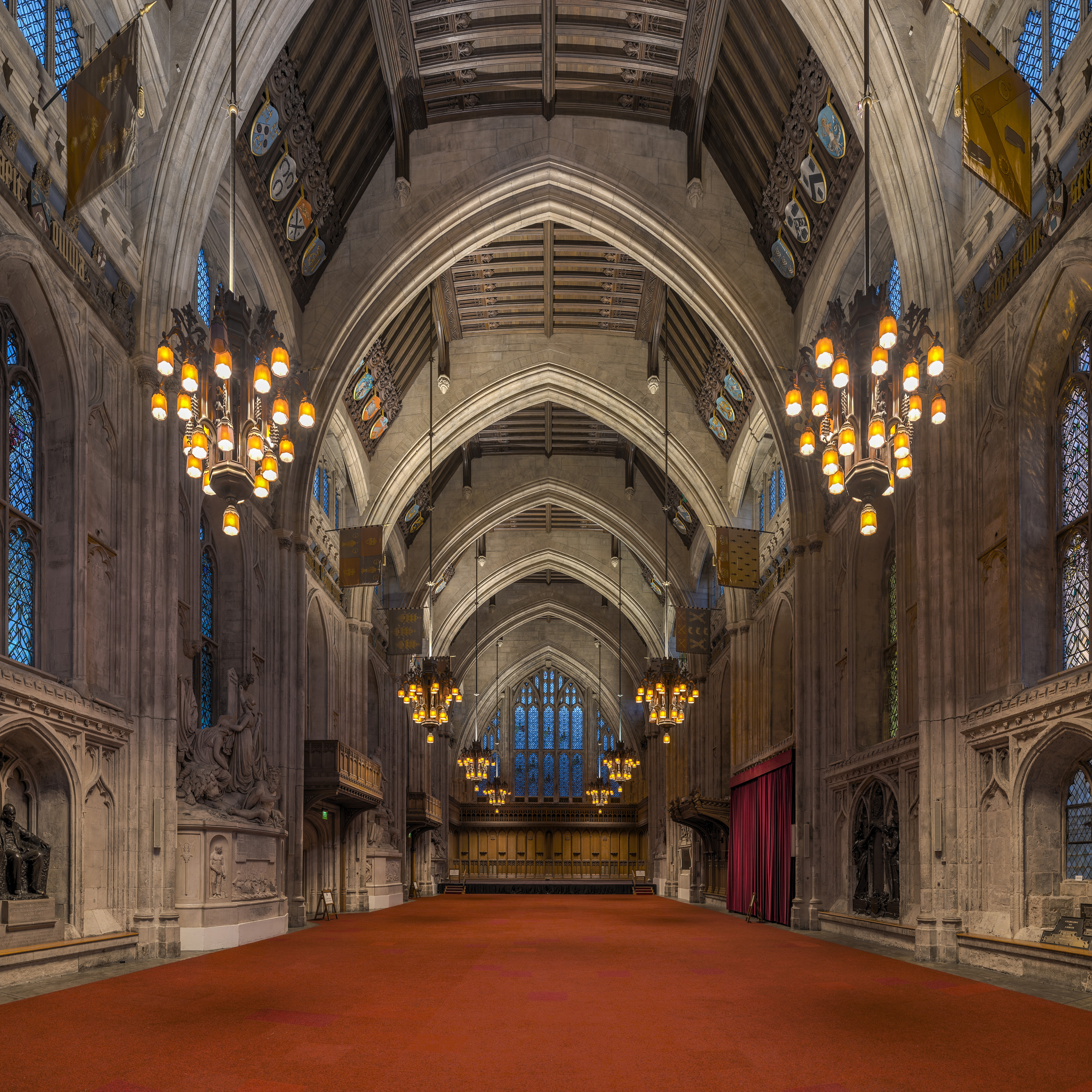
Guildhall, City of London

A guildhall, also known as a guild hall or guild house, is a type of historical building in Europe where a merchant or craft guild typically gathers.

In the Low Countries, the halls were built by merchant guilds for storing and selling goods and for meetings and celebratory events. In Great Britain, the halls were synonymous with town halls, used for tax payment and other town business. In the modern day, regardless of original use, buildings are often used as town halls and in some cases museums, while retaining their original names.

== As town hall in the United Kingdom ==
In the United Kingdom, a guildhall is usually a town hall: in the vast majority of cases, the guildhalls have never served as the meeting place of any specific guild. A suggested etymology is from the Anglo Saxon "gild", or "payment"; the guildhall being where citizens came to pay their rates. The London Guildhall was established around 1120. For the Scottish municipal equivalent see tolbooth.

=== List of guildhalls in the United Kingdom ===
- Andover Guildhall
- Barnstaple Guildhall
- Bath Guildhall
- Beverley Guildhall
- Bewdley Guildhall
- Blakeney Guildhall
- Bodmin Guildhall
- Boston Guildhall
- Bradninch Guildhall
- Brecon Guildhall
- Bristol Guildhall
- Bury St Edmunds Guildhall
- Cambridge Guildhall
- Canterbury Guildhall
- Cardigan Guildhall
- Carmarthen Guildhall
- Chard Guildhall
- Chester Guildhall
- Chichester Guildhall
- Conwy Guildhall
- Derby Guildhall
- Devonport Guildhall
- Dunfermline Guildhall
- Derry Guildhall
- Exeter Guildhall
- Faversham Guildhall
- Gloucester Guildhall
- Grantham Guildhall
- Guildford Guildhall
- Harwich Guildhall
- Helston Guildhall
- High Wycombe Guildhall
- Hull Guildhall
- King's Lynn Guildhall
- Guildhall of St George, Kings Lynn
- Kingston upon Thames Guildhall
- Lavenham Guildhall
- Leicester Guildhall
- Lichfield Guildhall
- Lincoln Guildhall
- Liskeard Guildhall
- Llantrisant Guildhall
- London Guildhall
- Looe Guildhall
- Lostwithiel Guildhall
- Lydd Guildhall
- Lyme Regis Guildhall
- Middlesex Guildhall
- Much Wenlock Guildhall
- Newcastle-under-Lyme Guildhall
- Newcastle upon Tyne Guildhall
- Merchant Adventurers' Hall, York
- Newport Guildhall, Isle of Wight
- Newport Guildhall, Shropshire
- Northampton Guildhall
- Norwich Guildhall
- Oswestry Guildhall
- Peterborough Guildhall
- Plymouth Guildhall
- Plympton Guildhall
- Poole Guildhall
- Portsmouth Guildhall
- Preston Guildhall
- Rochester Guildhall
- Salisbury Guildhall
- Saltash Guildhall
- Sandwich Guildhall
- Southampton Guildhall
- South Molton Guildhall
- St Ives Guildhall
- St Mary's Guildhall, Coventry
- Stratford-upon-Avon Guildhall
- Swansea Guildhall
- Thaxted Guildhall
- Thetford Guildhall
- Totnes Guildhall
- Weymouth Guildhall
- Winchester Guildhall
- Windsor Guildhall
- Worcester Guildhall
- Wrexham Guildhall
- York Guildhall
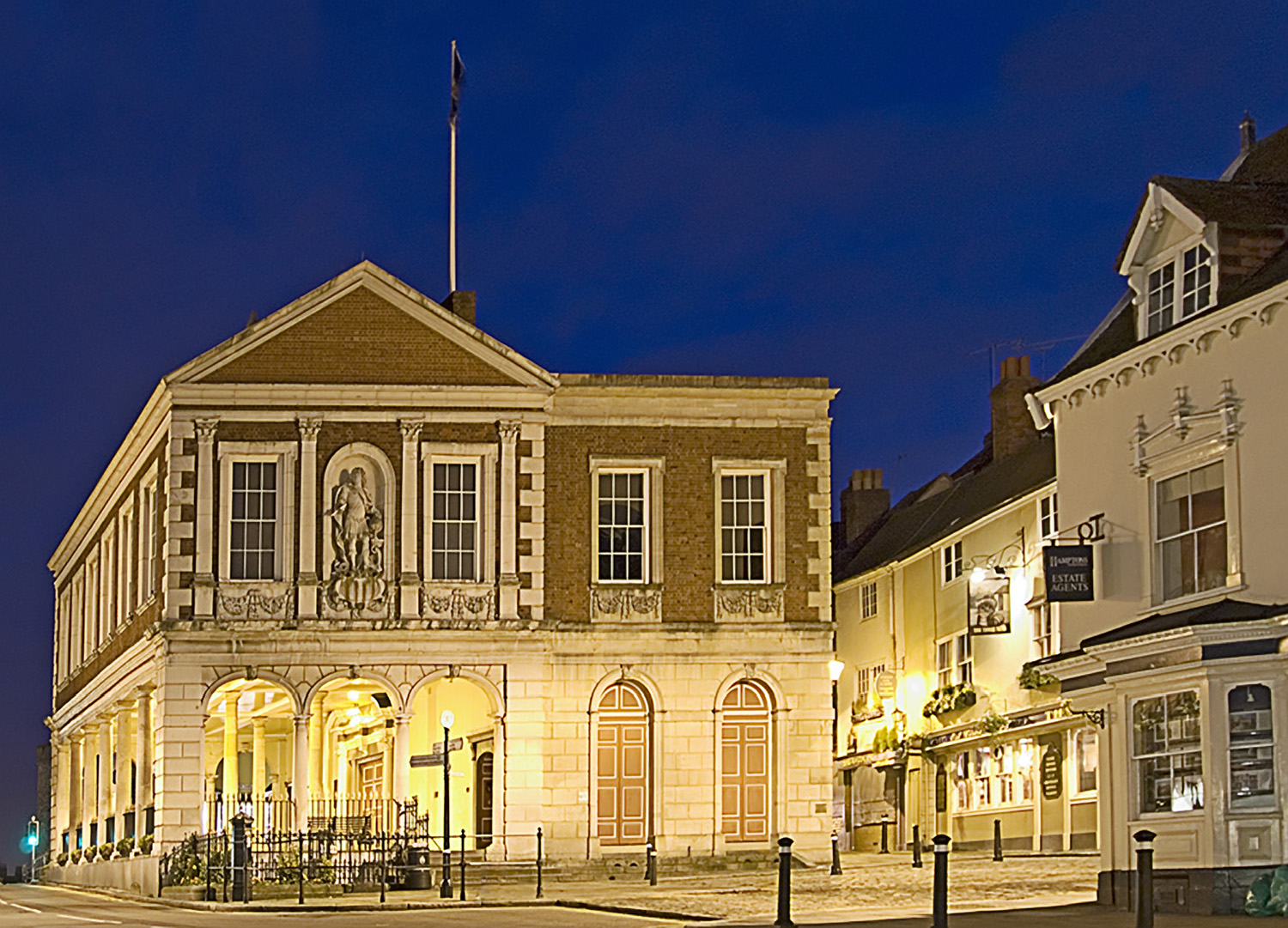
Windsor Guildhall in Windsor, Berkshire also served as market, town hall and courtroom

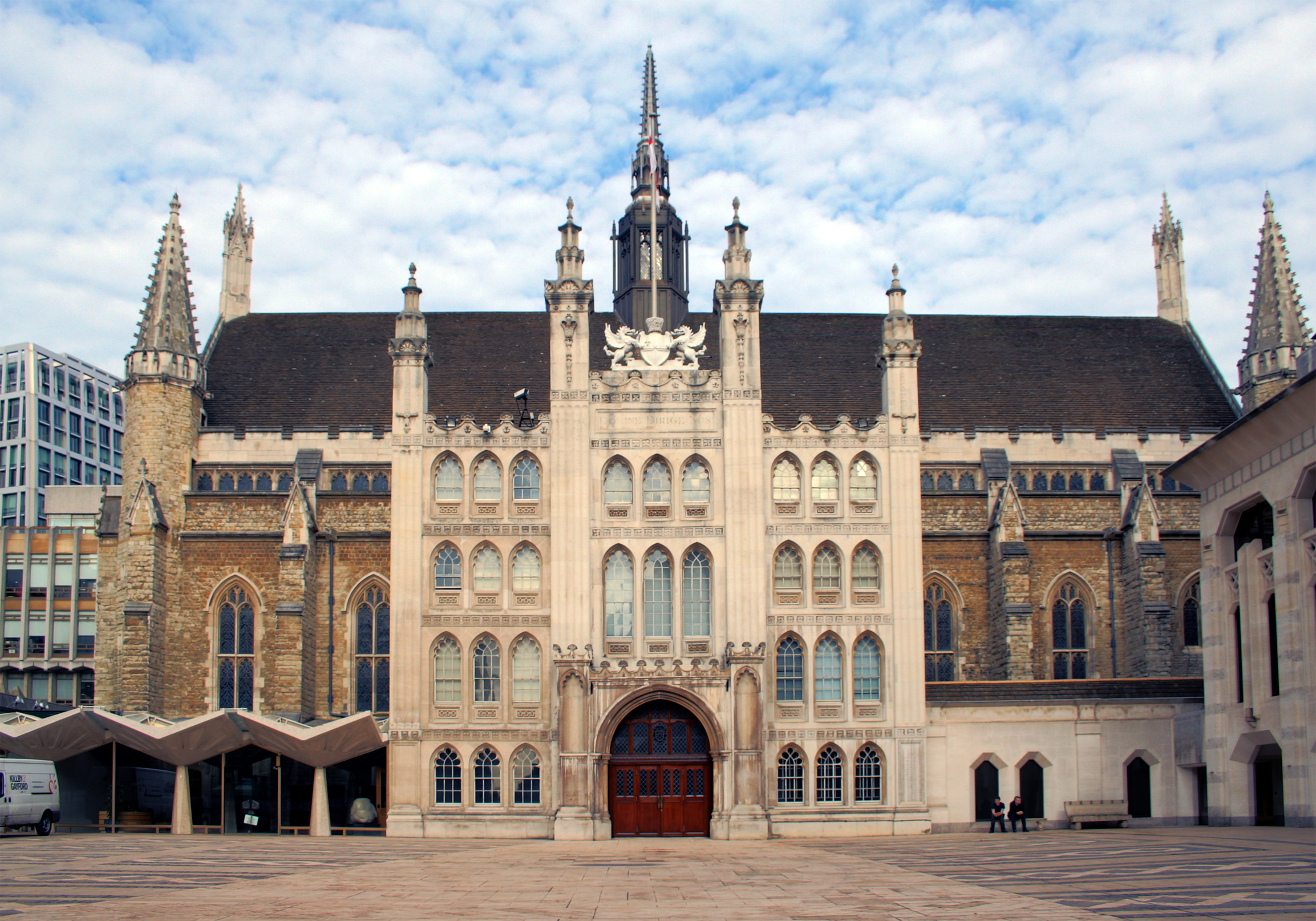
Guildhall, London, in the City of London, is the seat of the Corporation of London, the governing body of the city.

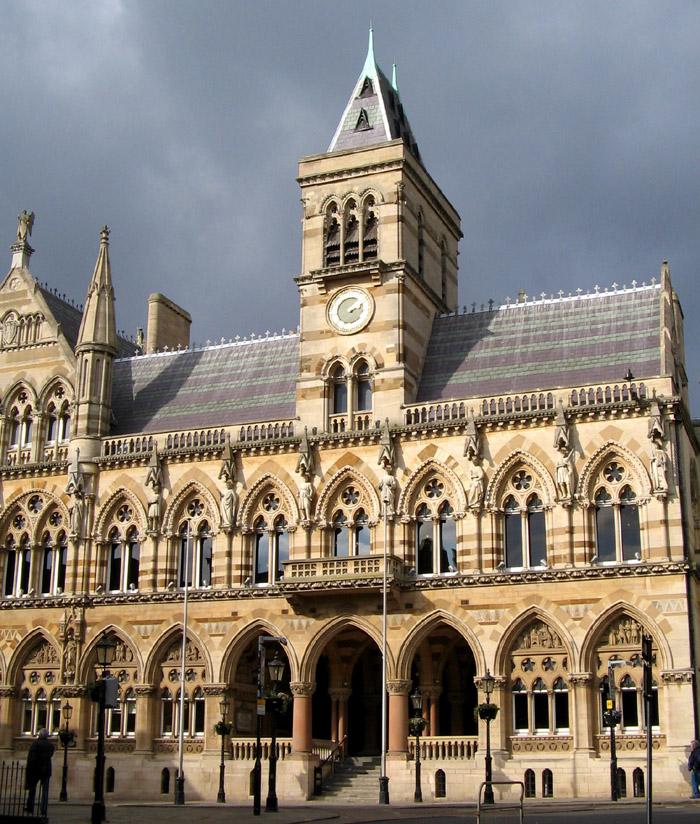
Guildhall, Northampton

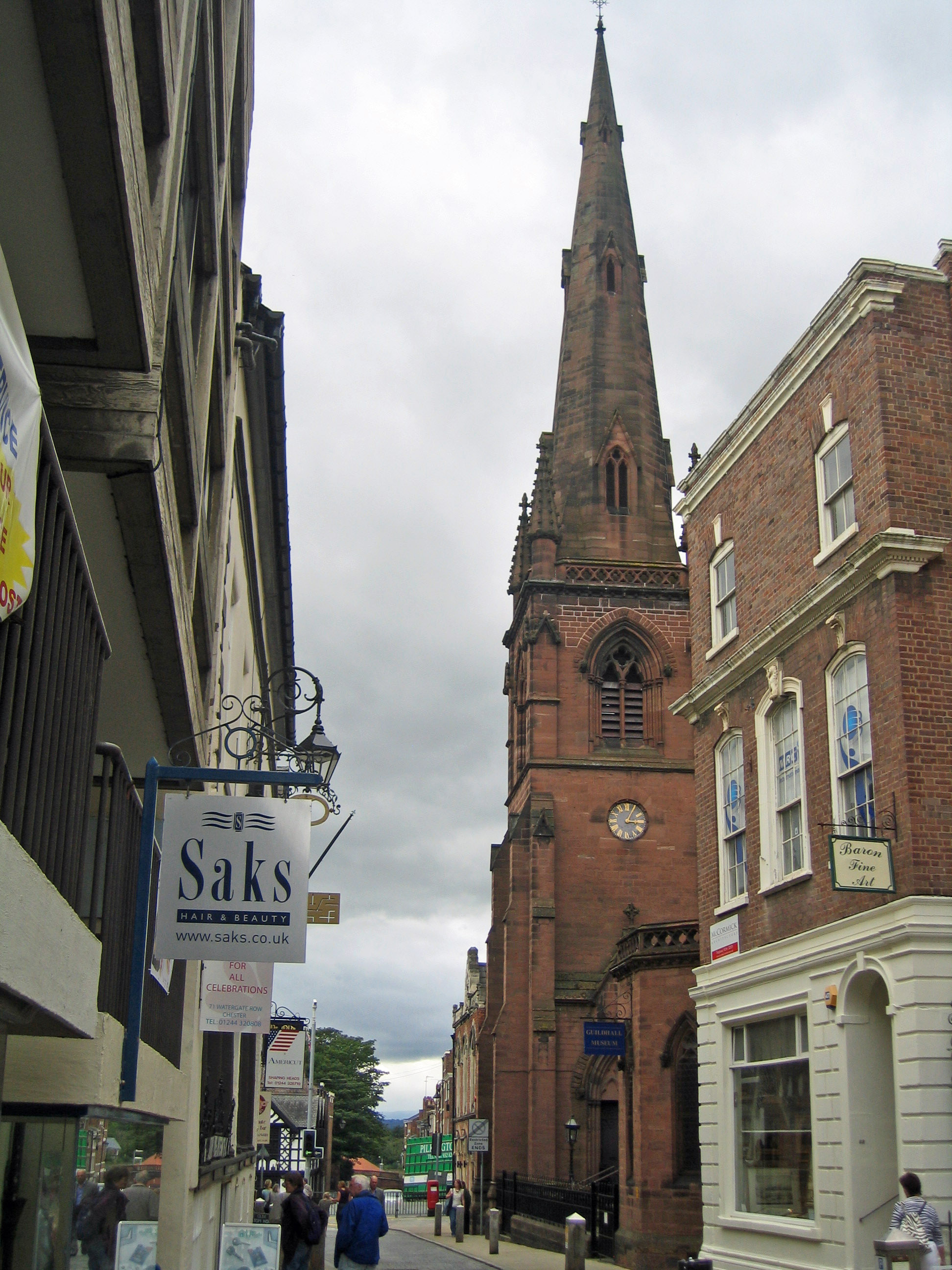
Guildhall, Chester

== As meeting houses for guilds ==
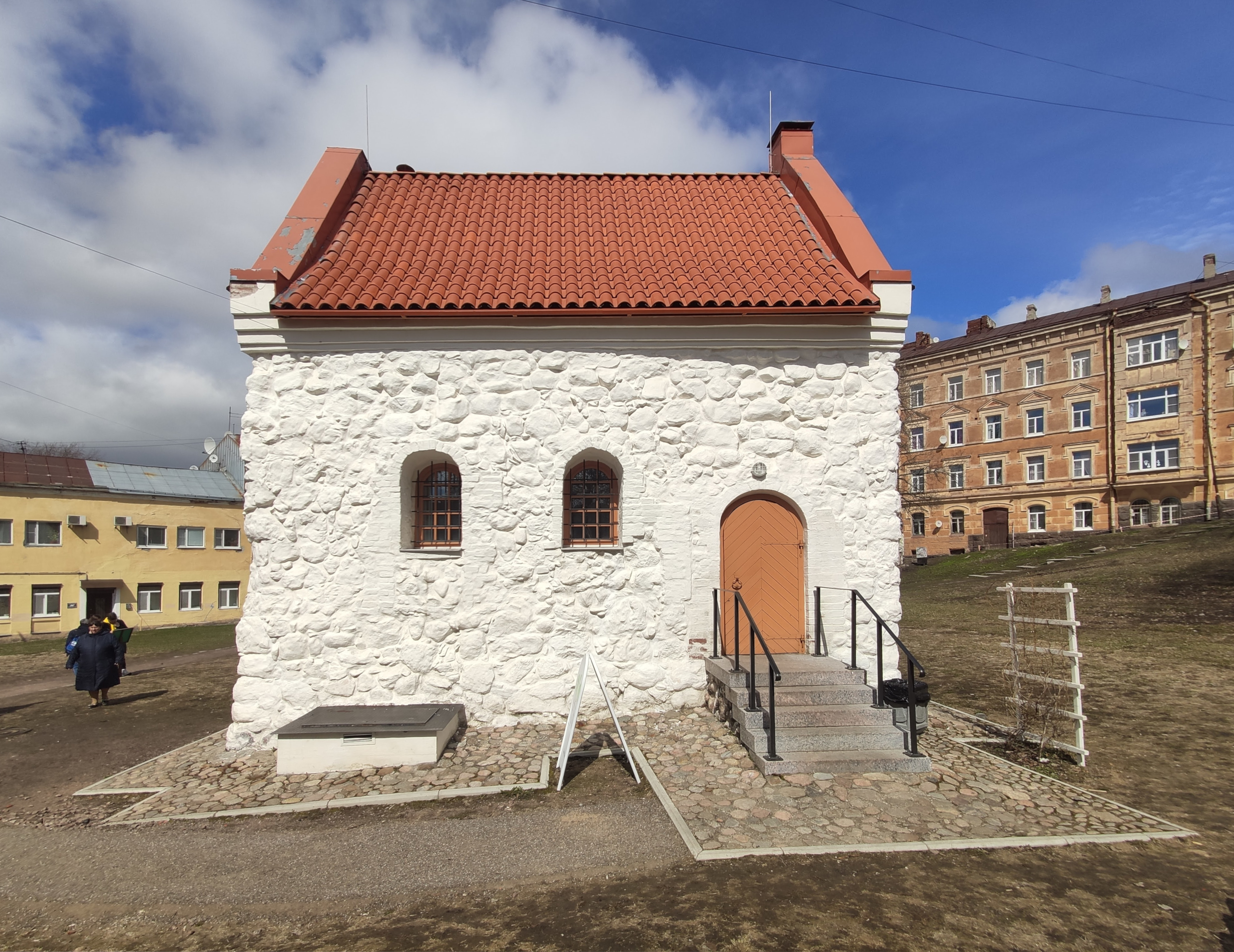
The Merchant Guild House in Vyborg

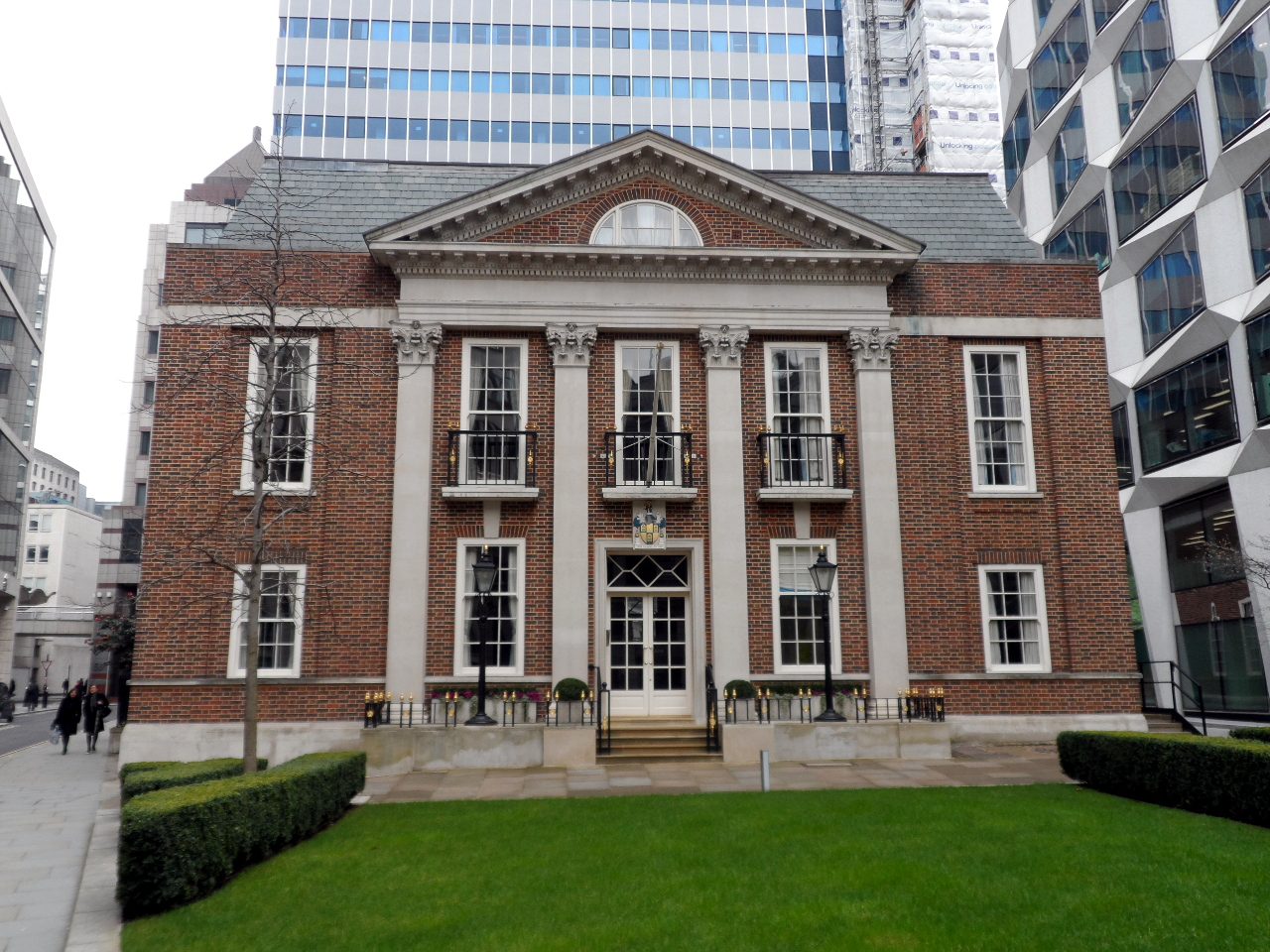
Girdler's Hall, the livery hall (guild hall) of the Worshipful Company of Girdlers in the City of London

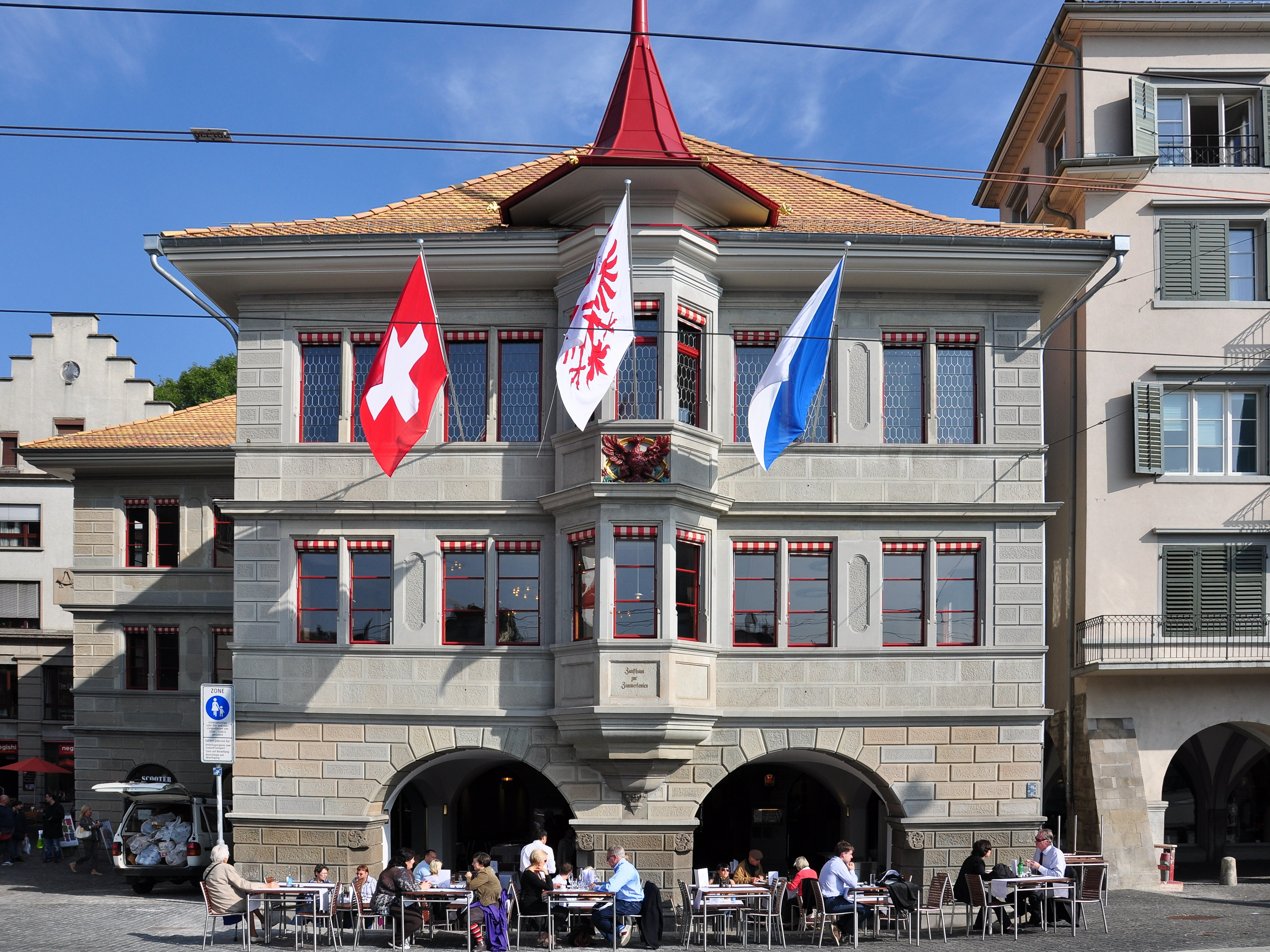
The Zunfthaus zur Zimmerleuten (carpenters' guildhall) in Zürich

A type of guild was known in Roman times. Known as collegium, collegia or corpus, these were organised groups of merchants who specialised in a particular craft and whose membership of the group was voluntary. One such example is the corpus naviculariorum, the college of long-distance shippers based at Rome's port, Ostia Antica. The Roman guilds failed to survive the collapse of the Roman Empire.

Merchant guilds were reinvented during Europe's medieval period. In England, these guilds went by many different names including: fraternity, brotherhood, college, company, corporation, fellowship, livery, or society, amongst other terms. In Europe, merchant guilds were known as "natie", "consulado", or "hansa". A fraternity, formed by the merchants of Tiel in Gelderland (present-day Netherlands), in 1020 is believed to be the first example of a medieval guild. The first instance of usage of the term, "guild", was the gilda mercatoria used to describe a body of merchants operating out of Saint-Omer, France in the 11th century and London's Hanse was formed in the 12th century. The merchants of Cologne had their house in London as early as 1157 and the Guilda Teutonicorum (German merchants warehouse) was located at Cosin Lane and Thames Street in London on the 12th century.

These guilds controlled the way that trade was conducted in their region and codified rules governing the conditions of trade. Once established, merchant guild rules were often incorporated into the charters granted to market towns. By the 13th and 14th centuries, merchant guilds had acquired sufficient resources to erect guild halls in many major market towns.

Medieval guild halls were used to store goods and as places for celebratory events. When not required for guild members' events, the hall often became place where townspeople could hold entertainments such as Passion plays. Guild members often cleaned streets, removed rubbish, maintained a nightwatch and provided food relief to the poor. Some medieval guilds allowed market trading to occur on the ground floor of the guildhall.

In the City of London, the guilds are called "livery companies", and their guild halls are called livery halls.

=== In the Low Countries ===
The Low Countries used to have guildhalls in every city, often one gildenhuis (Dutch, literally "guild house") for each trade. They were often elaborate, ornate buildings, demonstrating the guild's status. Occasionally a single hall would be used by all the city's guilds.

The guildhall was used as the offices of the deken (deacon) and other guild officers, and for meetings by the overlieden (board of directors). The guild members would occasionally be called to the guildhall for meetings on important matters.

The guildhall of the merchants' guild also served as de facto market place. Therefore, there was no need in the Middle Ages for a separate building for this purpose.

In the Low Countries, each guildhall was marked by the coat of arms of that guild, hanging from the facade of the building. Occasionally, the coat of arms was replaced with a gable stone depicting a member of the guild, surrounded by the tools of his trade.

==== In the Netherlands ====
In Amsterdam, every guildhall had its gildeknecht (guild servant), often the guild's youngest member, and was guarded by a gildehond (guild dog). Every evening, the guild brothers gathered in the tavern room of the guildhall to discuss the events of the day while the gildeknecht served beer. Once a year, the guildmen would gather in the guildhall for a communal meal.

==== In Belgium ====
- The Round Table (or Tafelrond, in Dutch) in Leuven. Designed 1479 by Matheus de Layens, guildhall built 1480–1487 internally comprising three houses, demolished 1817, reconstructed following original plans 1921. The old building's meeting rooms had been let to the guilds; the new had been in use by a bank and became a personal private property.
- The Salmon (or De Zalm, in Dutch) in Mechelen. Built c. 1530 in early Renaissance style by architect Willem van Wechtere for the prosperous fishermen's guild, it is one of the city's finest historical houses. The artist Willem Geets (1839–1919) used to live there. In the mid-20th century it became city property and held a museum, then the Tourist Information Office, and later again a museum.
- In Brussels, the Grand-Place/Grote Markt is famous for its many Baroque guildhalls, each one belonging to one of the former Guilds of Brussels.
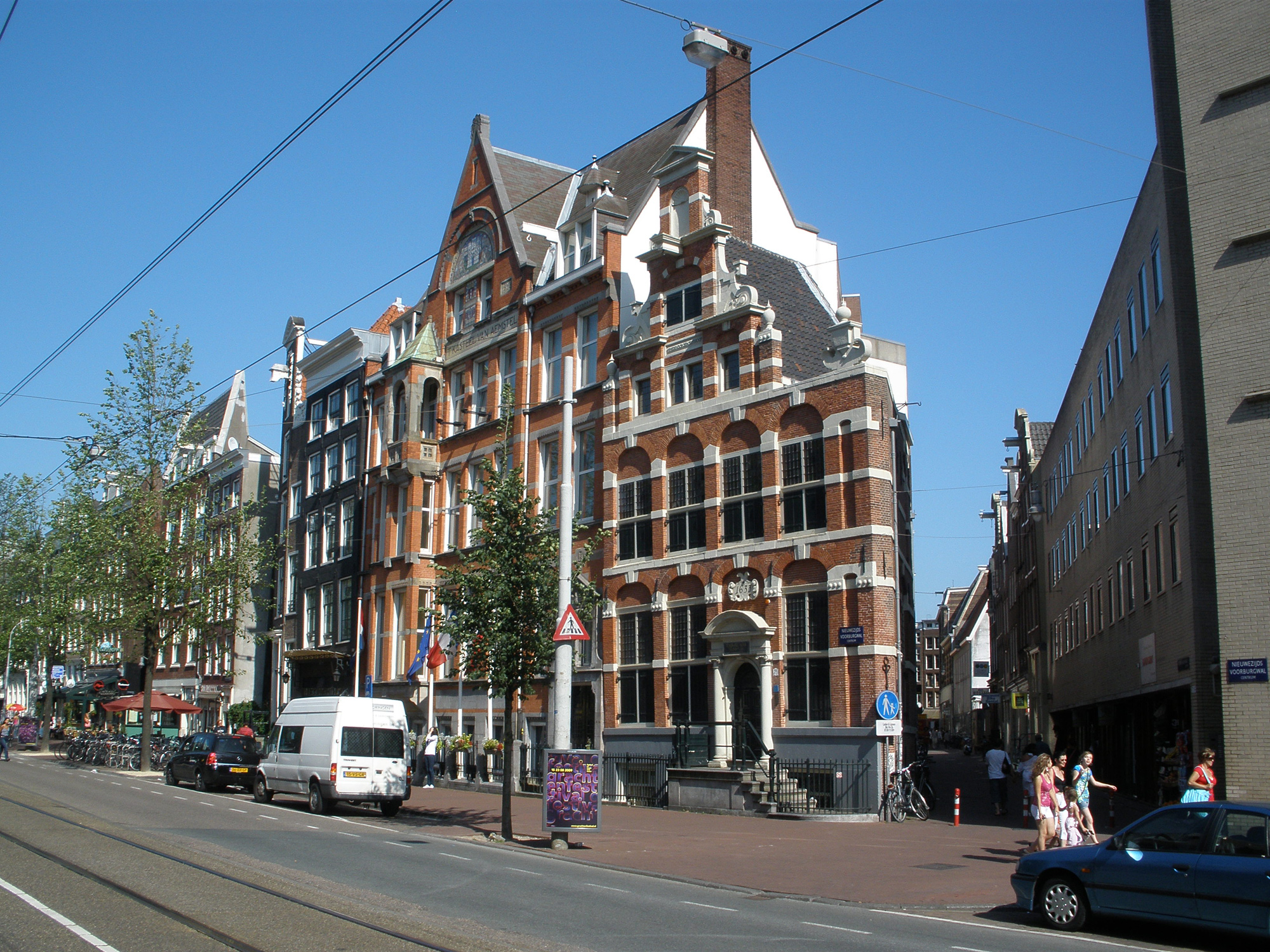
The Makelaers Comptoir (brokers' guildhall) in Amsterdam

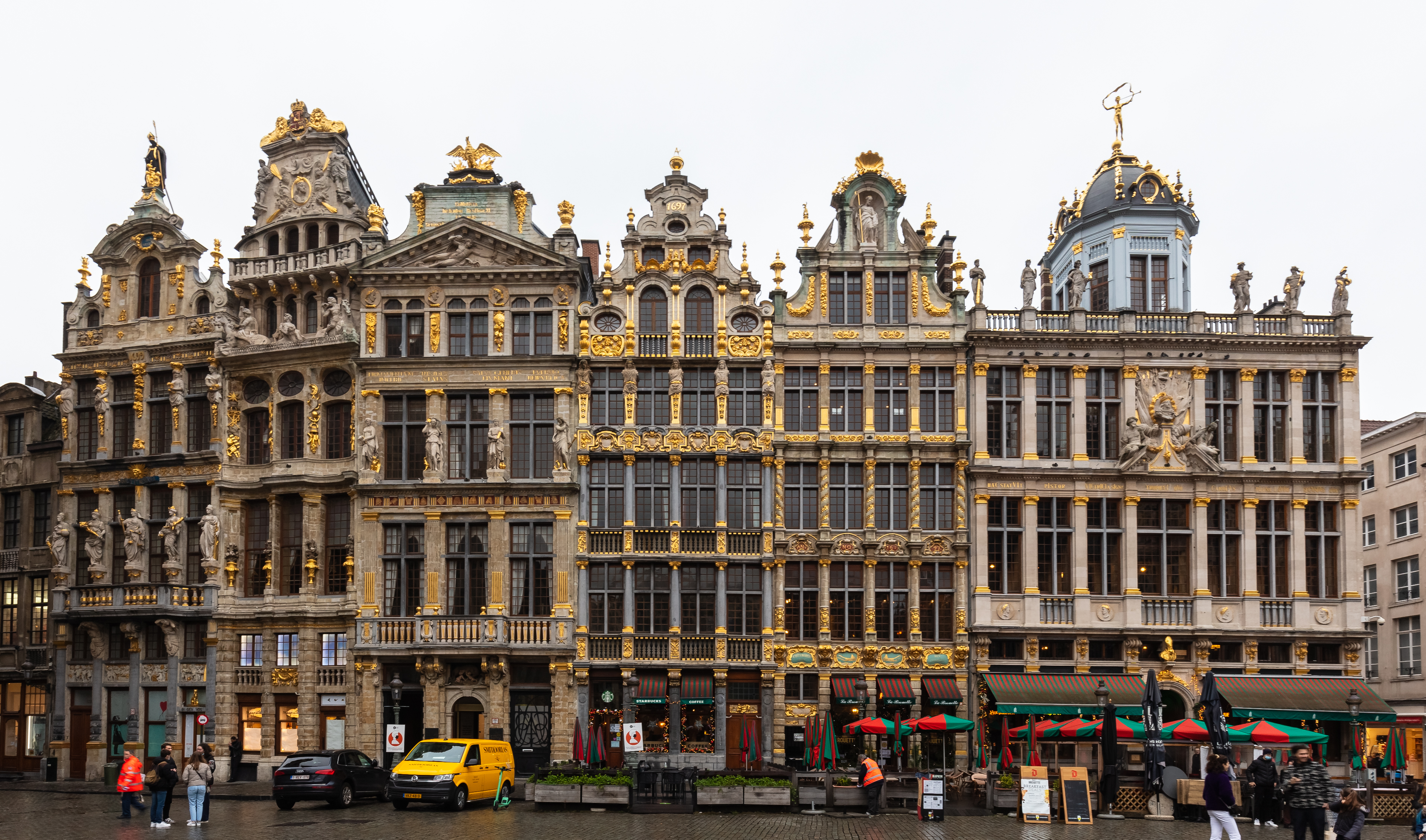
Grand-Place/Grote Markt of Brussels. From right to left: Le Roy d'Espagne, La Brouette, Le Sac, La Louve, Le Cornet and Le Renard.

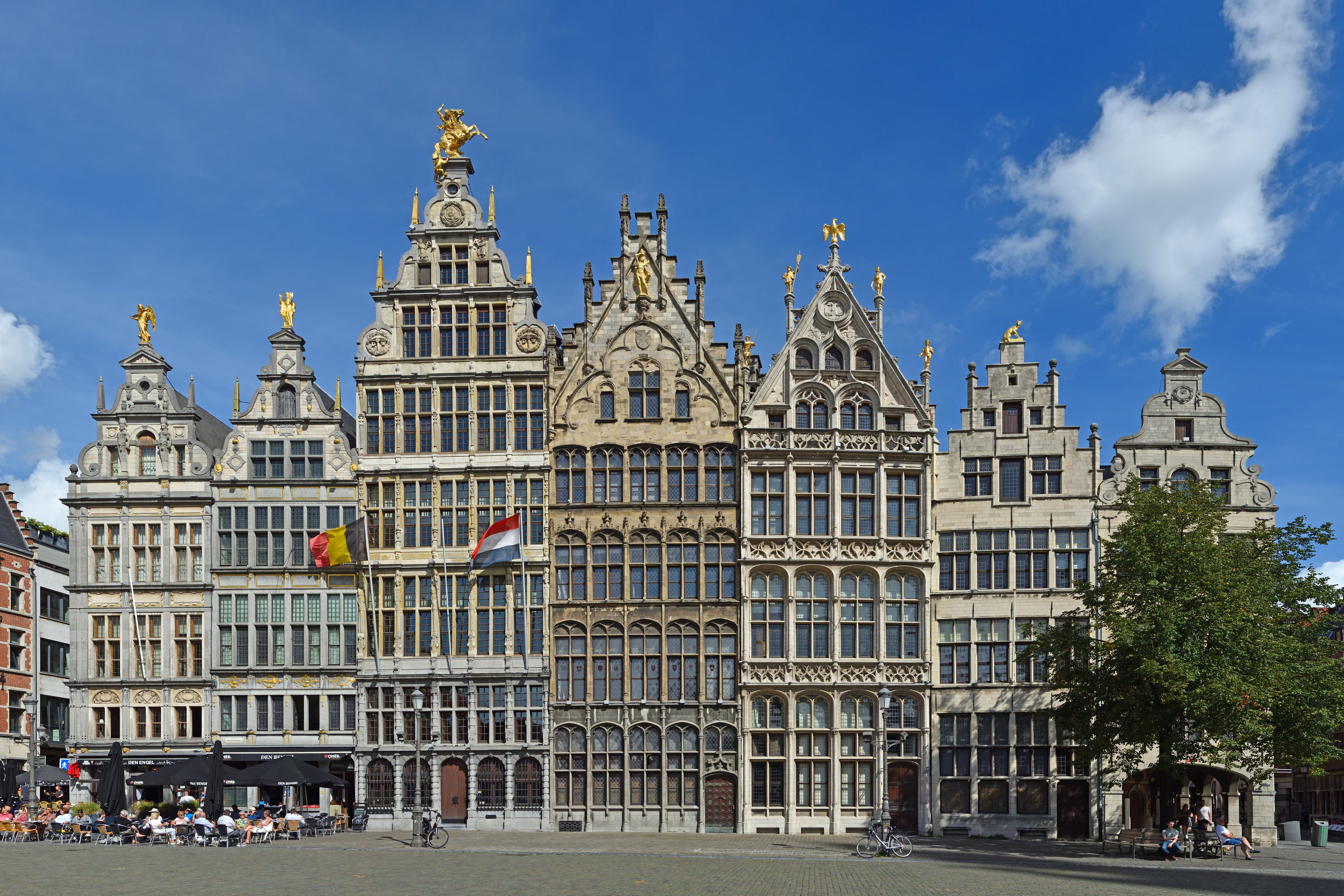
Guildhalls at the Grote Markt in Antwerp

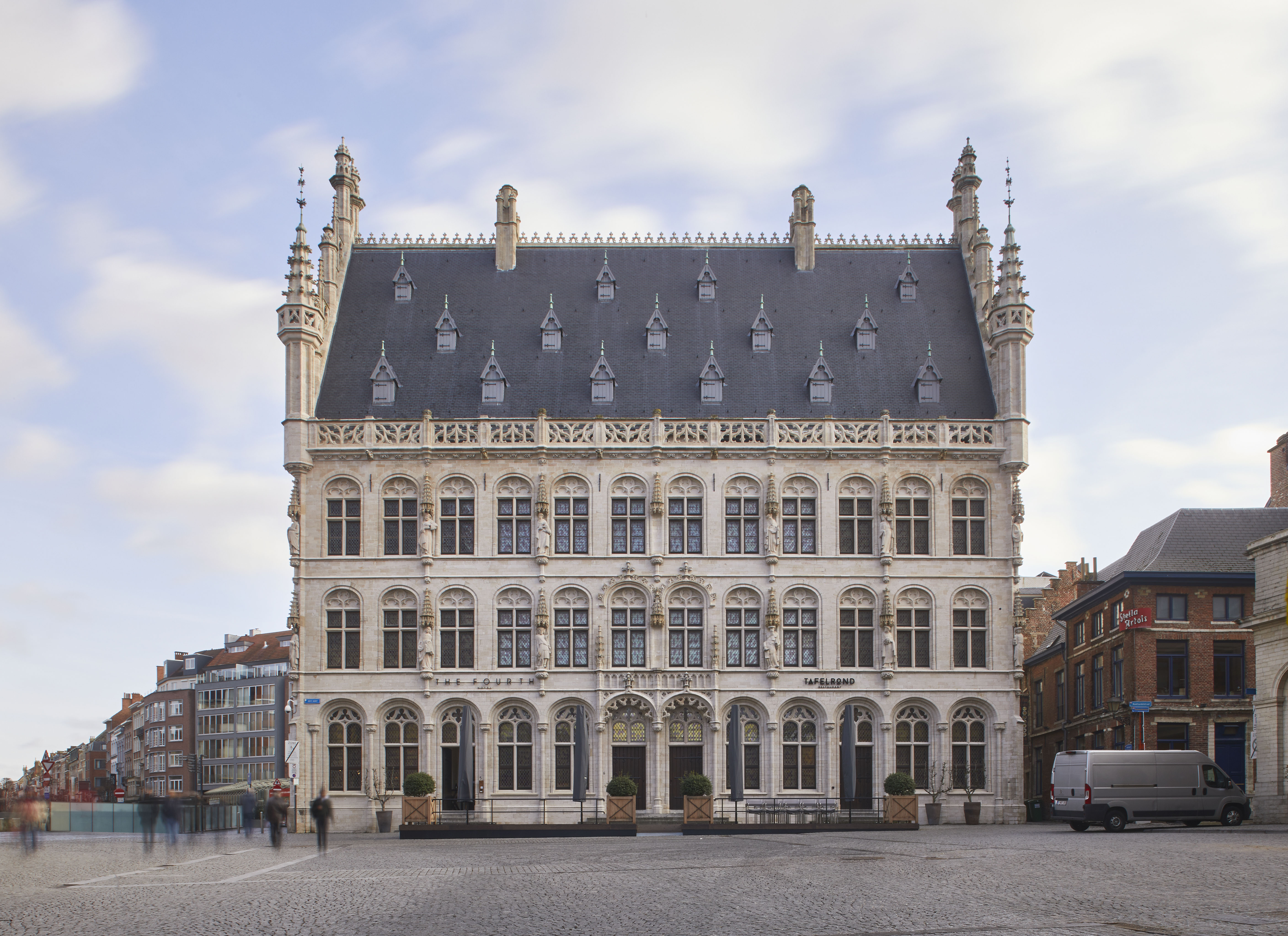
The Round Table (Tafelrond) at the Grote Markt in Leuven

== See also ==
- Company of Merchant Adventurers of London
- Company of Merchant Adventurers to New Lands
- Germania (guild)
- Guild
