= List of houses of the Grand-Place =

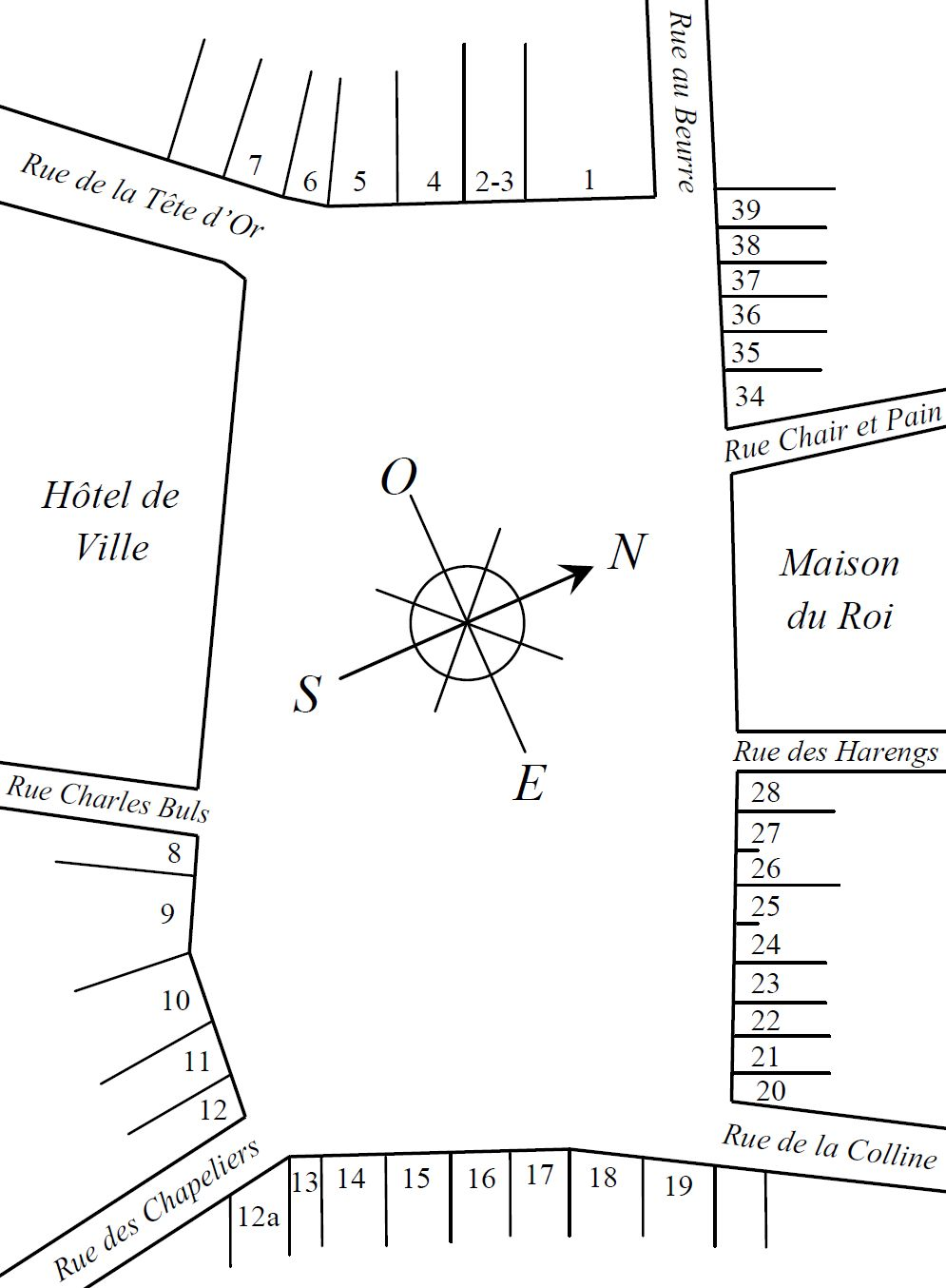
Site plan of the Grand-Place/Grote Markt in Brussels

The Grand-Place/Grote Markt in Brussels, Belgium, is lined on each side with a number of guildhalls and a few private houses. At first modest structures, in their current form, they are largely the result of the reconstruction after the bombardment of 1695. The strongly structured façades with their rich sculptural decoration including pilasters and balustrades and their lavishly designed gables are based on Italian Baroque with some Flemish influences. The architects involved in the new development were Jan Cosijn, Pieter Herbosch, Antoine Pastorana, Cornelis van Nerven, Guilliam or Willem de Bruyn and Adolphe Samyn.

In addition to the name of the respective guild, each house has its own name. The house numbering starts at the northern corner of the square to the left of the Rue au Beurre/Boterstraat in a counter-clockwise direction. The most ornate houses are probably no. 1 to 7 on the north-western side. On the south-western side, between the Rue de la Tête d'or/Guldenhoofdstraat and Rue Charles Buls/Karel Bulsstraat, are the Town Hall, and the houses no. 8 to 12 to the left of it on the south-eastern side. Still on the south-eastern side, between the Rue des Chapeliers/Hoedenmakersstraat and the Rue de la Colline/Bergstraat, are the houses no. 13 to 19. On the north-eastern side, the King's House, which is located between the Rue des Harengs/Haringstraat and the Rue Chair et Pain/Vlees-en-Broodstraat, is to the right of the houses no. 20 to 28 and to the left of the houses no. 34 to 39.

== Between the Rue de la Tête d'or/Guldenhoofdstraat and the Rue au Beurre/Boterstraat (north-west) ==
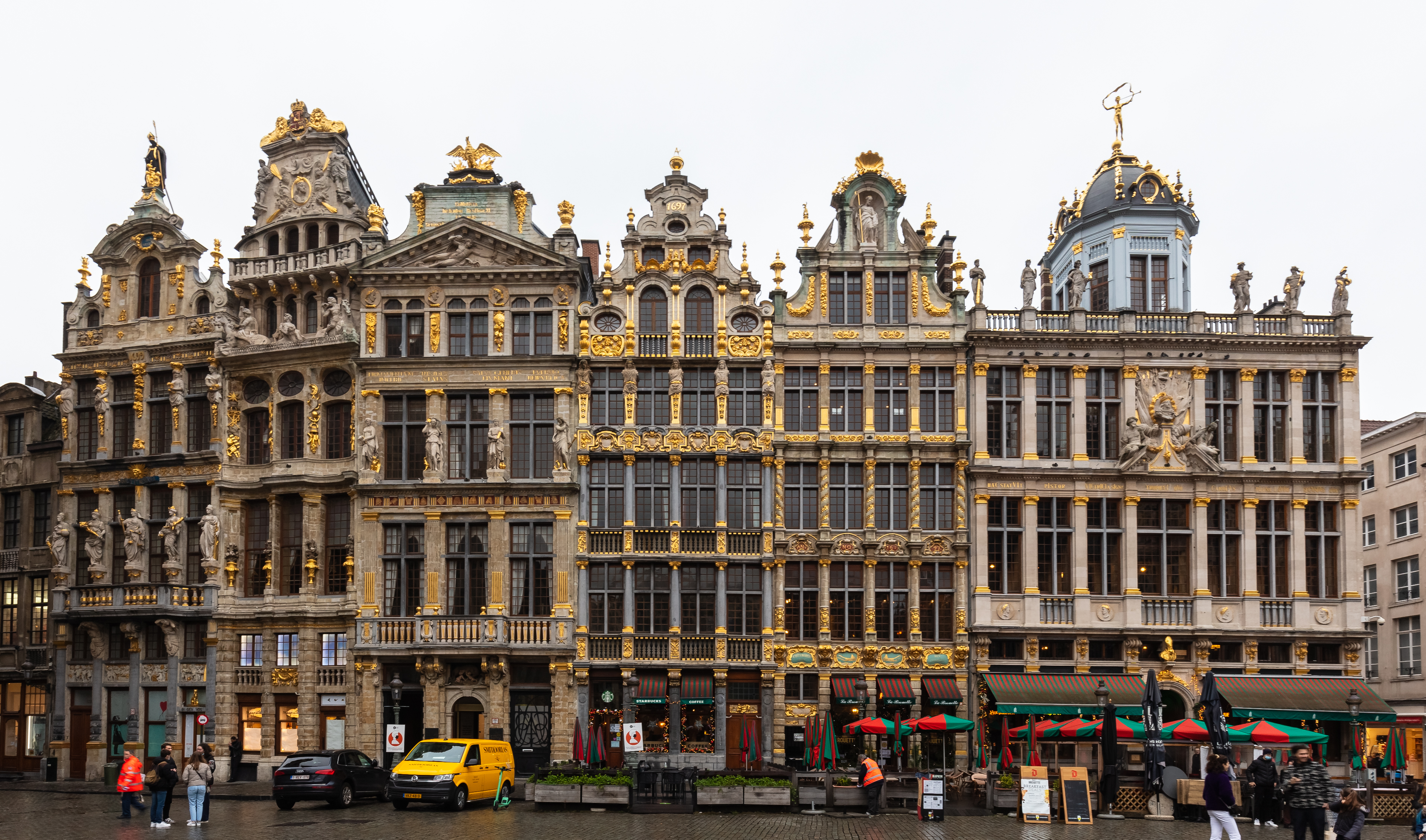
From right to left: Le Roy d'Espagne, La Brouette, Le Sac, La Louve, Le Cornet and Le Renard

House no.	Illustration	Name	Original guild/function	Description
1		Le Roy d'Espagne (Dutch: Den Coninck van Spaigniën; "The King of Spain")	House of the Corporation of Bakers	Built in 1696–97 probably under the direction of the architect Jan Cosijn. Originally, the three bays to the right of the entrance formed an independent house (Saint-Jacques), accessible through a door located on the Rue au Beurre/Boterstraat. The very dilapidated building was completely rebuilt in 1898–1902 by the architect Adolphe Samyn. It is decorated with busts of Saint Aubert (patron saint of bakers) and Charles II of Spain.
2–3		La Brouette (Dutch: Den Cruywagen; "The Wheelbarrow")	House of the Corporation of Greasers	Former property of the Corporation of Greasers since the 15th century, built in stone in 1644. The façade partly resisted the bombardment of 1695 and was rebuilt in 1696–97 probably by Jan Cosijn. Decorated with a statue of Saint Giles (patron saint of greasers), it was restored in 1894–1913. The left door opened into a now disappeared alleyway that led onto the Rue au Beurre.
4		Le Sac (Dutch: Den Sack; "The Bag")	House of the Corporation of Carpenters	Former property of the Corporation of Carpenters, whose tools decorate the façade since the 15th century. Built in stone in 1644, partly spared by the bombardment, it was rebuilt (from the third floor up) and restored (lower levels and interior) in 1697 by the carpenter Antoine Pastorana. The sculptures from this reconstruction are the work of Peter van Dievoet and Laurent Merkaert. The façade was restored in 1854–1858 by the City of Brussels' architect, Victor Jamaer, and again in 1907–1913 by the architect Jean Segers. Nowadays, a Starbucks coffee shop is located on the ground floor of this building.
5		La Louve (Dutch: Den Wolf or Den Wolvin; "The She-Wolf")	House of the Oath of Archers	Built in 1690–91 by Pieter Herbosch. In 1696, the façade was rebuilt with a horizontal cornice, surmounted by a base where a statue was placed of a Phoenix rising from the ashes, symbol of the city's reconstruction after the bombardment. The decorated pediment of Apollo was restored in 1890–1892 by Victor Jamaer, according to the original drawings. The bas-relief represents Romulus and Remus suckling the she-wolf.
6		Le Cornet (Dutch: Den Horen; "The Cornet")	House of the Corporation of Boatmen	Former property of the Corporation of Boatmen since the 15th century, built in 1641–1645 according to the plans of the stonemason Godefroid. It was rebuilt in 1697–1704 by Antoine Pastorana who drew its gable in the shape of a ship stern. The sculptures are by Peter van Dievoet, and by a contract passed on 3 April 1697, the deans of the Trade of Boatmen entrusted Peter van Dievoet with the execution of the whole sculpting of the façade. The building was restored in 1885–1902 by Adolphe Samyn after a project by Victor Jamaer.
7		Le Renard (Dutch: Den Vos; "The Fox")	House of the Corporation of Haberdashers	Former property of the Corporation of Haberdashers since the 15th century, built in 1641, rebuilt in 1697–1700, and restored in 1879–1885 by Victor Jamaer. It contains bas-reliefs above the ground floor, allegorical sculptures of the four continents, and at the top, a (now disappeared) statue of Saint Nicholas, patron of haberdashers.

== Between the Rue Charles Buls/Karel Bulsstraat and the Rue des Chapeliers/Hoedenmakersstraat (south-east) ==
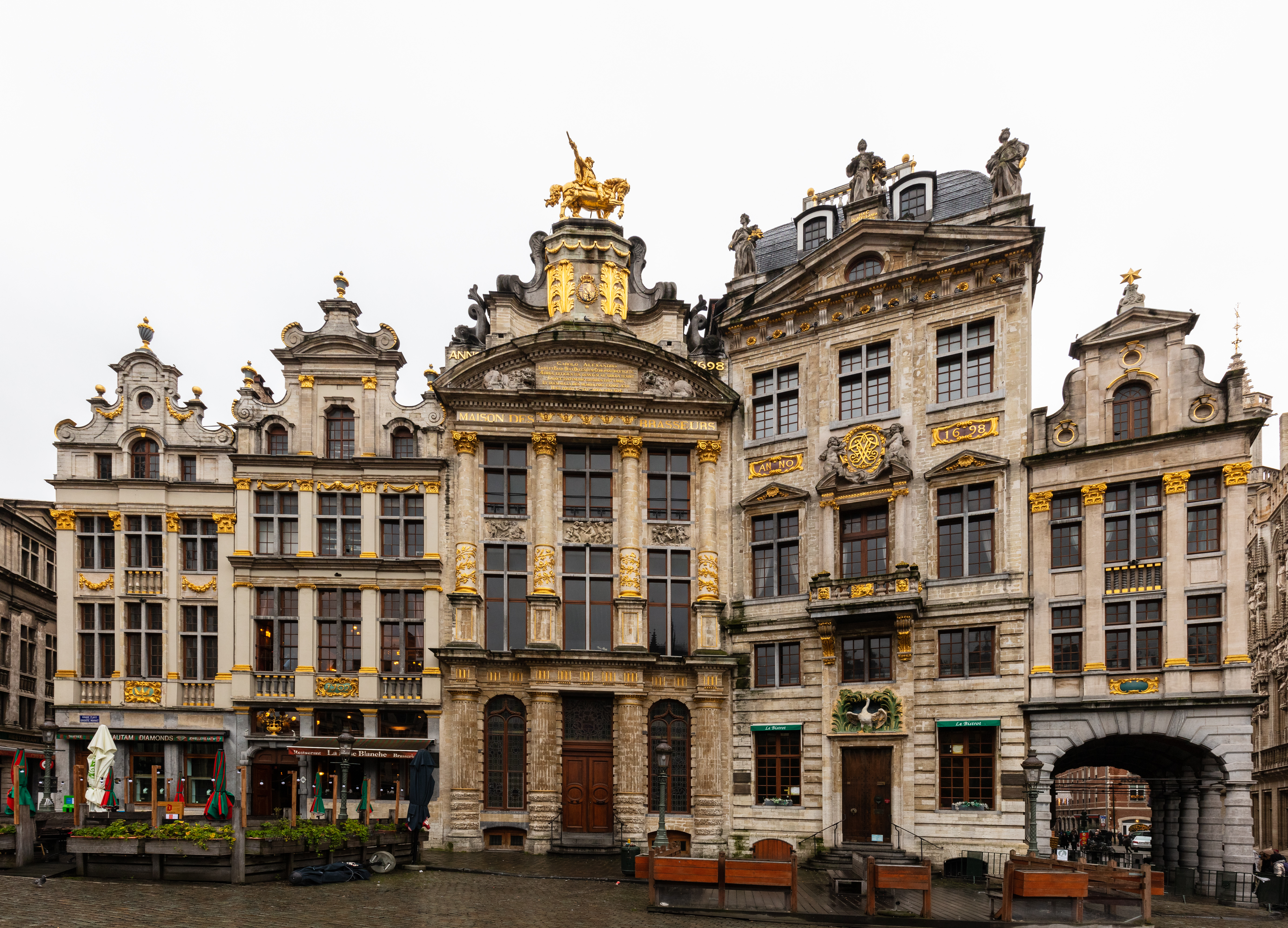
From right to left: L'Étoile, Le Cygne, L'Arbre d'Or, La Rose and Le Mont Thabor

House no.	Illustration	Name	Original guild/function	Description
8		L'Étoile (Dutch: De Sterre; "The Star")	House of the Amman	Built in 1695–96. It was demolished in 1853 with the whole side of the street whose corner it occupies, and which was then called the Rue de l'Étoile/Sterrestraat, to allow the passage of a horse-drawn tramway. Rebuilt in 1896–97 by Adolphe Samyn at the initiative of the City of Brussels' then-mayor, Charles Buls, by replacing the ground floor with a colonnade, it became an annex to the neighbouring house. The street was renamed the Rue Charles Buls/Karel Bulsstraat in the mayor's honour, and a plaque in tribute to him and to the builders of the Grand-Place is affixed in the passage under the house. Next to it is the monument to Everard t'Serclaes. It is a tradition that touching the figure brings good luck.
9		Le Cygne (Dutch: De Zwane; "The Swan")	House of the Corporation of Butchers	Bourgeois house built in 1698, probably by the architect-sculptor Cornelis van Nerven, for the financier Pierre Fariseau whose monogram is placed in the centre of the façade. It was bought in 1720 by the former Corporation of Butchers who modified the upper part. It was restored in 1895–1904 by Adolphe Samyn. The founding congress of the Belgian Workers' Party was held there in April 1885. It is also in this house that Karl Marx wrote the Manifesto of the Communist Party.
10		L'Arbre d'Or (Dutch: Den Gulden Boom; "The Golden Tree")	House of the Corporation of Brewers	Now converted into a brewery museum, it is dated 1698 and was restored in 1893–1900. During construction, the architect Guillaume de Bruyn pronounced the sentence: "You had the conscience to work for eternity!". This house is adorned with sculptures by Marc de Vos and Peter van Dievoet and is capped by an equestrian statue of Charles Alexander of Lorraine, Governor of the Austrian Netherlands, which was installed in 1752 to replace another of Maximilian II Emmanuel of Bavaria, the governor during the reconstruction of Brussels.
11		La Rose (Dutch: De Roos; "The Rose")	Private house	Private house built in 1702 and restored in 1884–1888 by Victor Jamaer.
12		Le Mont Thabor (Dutch: Den Bergh Thabor; "The Mount Thabor")	Private house	Private house built in 1699 by Frans Timmermans and restored in 1885–1889 by Victor Jamaer.

== Between the Rue des Chapeliers/Hoedenmakersstraat and the Rue de la Colline/Bergstraat (south-east) ==
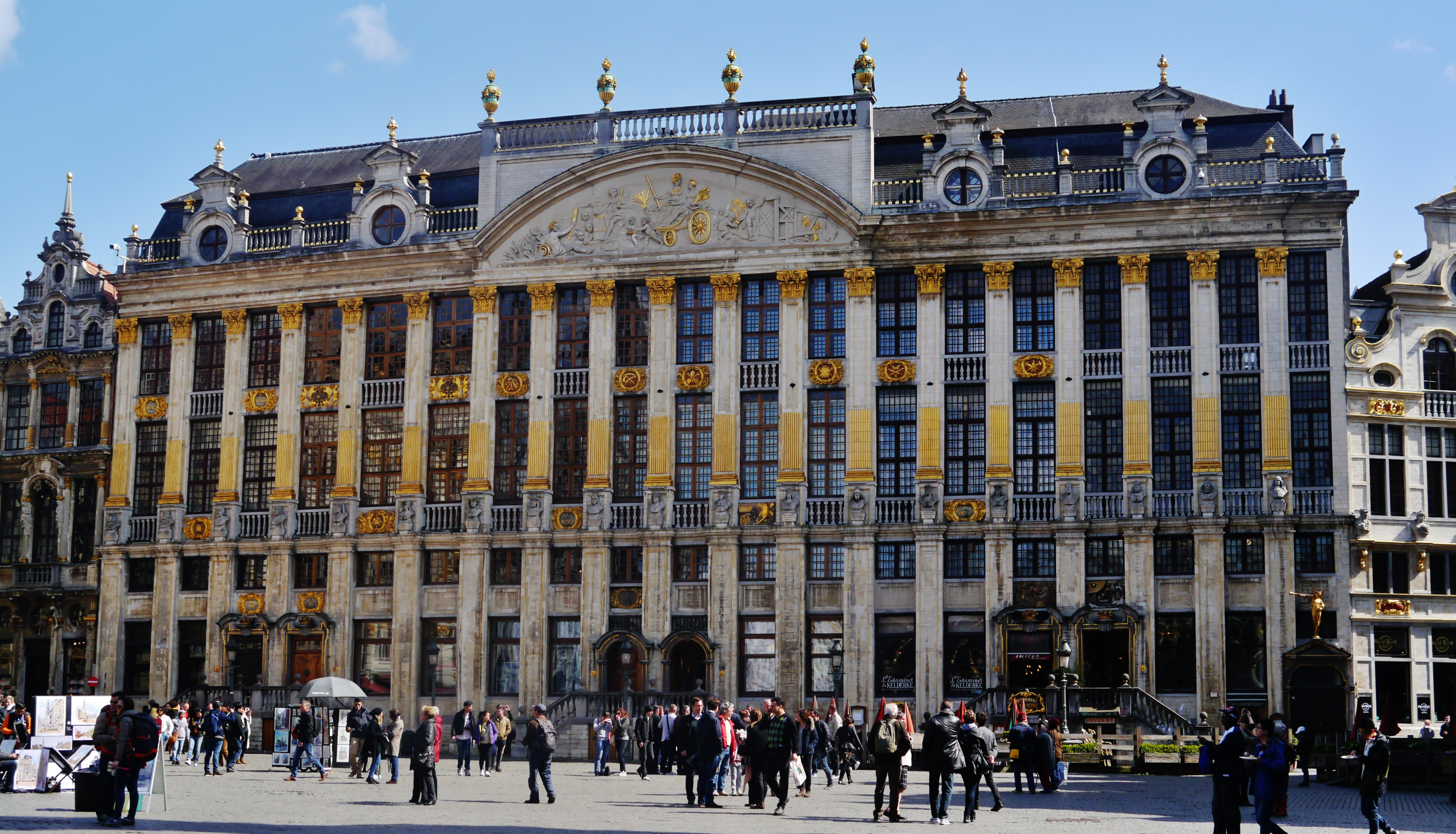
House of the Dukes of Brabant

House no.	Illustration	Name	Original guild/function	Description
12a		House of Alsemberg (French: Maison d'Alsemberg, Dutch: Huis van Alsemberg) or The King of Bavaria (French: Le Roi de Bavière, Dutch: De Koning van Beieren)	Private house	Formerly no. 2–4, rue des Chapeliers/Hoedenmakersstraat. Private house built in 1699 with a blue stone portal bearing the mark of the stonemason and a large oculus on the gable. It was restored in 1895–1908 by Adolphe Samyn and Jean Segers.
13–19		House of the Dukes of Brabant (French: Maison des Ducs de Brabant, Dutch: Huis van de Hertogen van Brabant)	Various (see below)	Set of seven houses grouped behind the same monumental façade designed by Guillaume de Bruyn and modified in 1770 by Laurent-Benoît Dewez, so called because of the busts of the Dukes of Brabant that adorn it. It was restored in 1881–1892 by Victor Jamaer.
13		La Renommée (Dutch: De Faem; "The Fame")	Private house	
14		L'Ermitage (Dutch: De Cluyse; "The Hermitage")	House of the Corporation of Carpet Makers	
15		La Fortune (Dutch: De Fortuin; "The Fortune")	House of the Corporation of Tanners	
16		Le Moulin à Vent (Dutch: De Windmolen; "The Windmill")	House of the Corporation of Millers	
17		Le Pot d'Étain (Dutch: De Tinnepot; "The Tin Pot")	House of the Corporation of Cartwrights	
18		La Colline (Dutch: De Heuvel; "The Hill")	House of the Corporation of Sculptors, Masons, Stone-Cutters and Slate-Cutters	
19		La Bourse (Dutch: De Borse; "The Purse")	Private house	

== Between the Rue de la Colline/Bergstraat and the Rue des Harengs/Haringstraat (north-east) ==
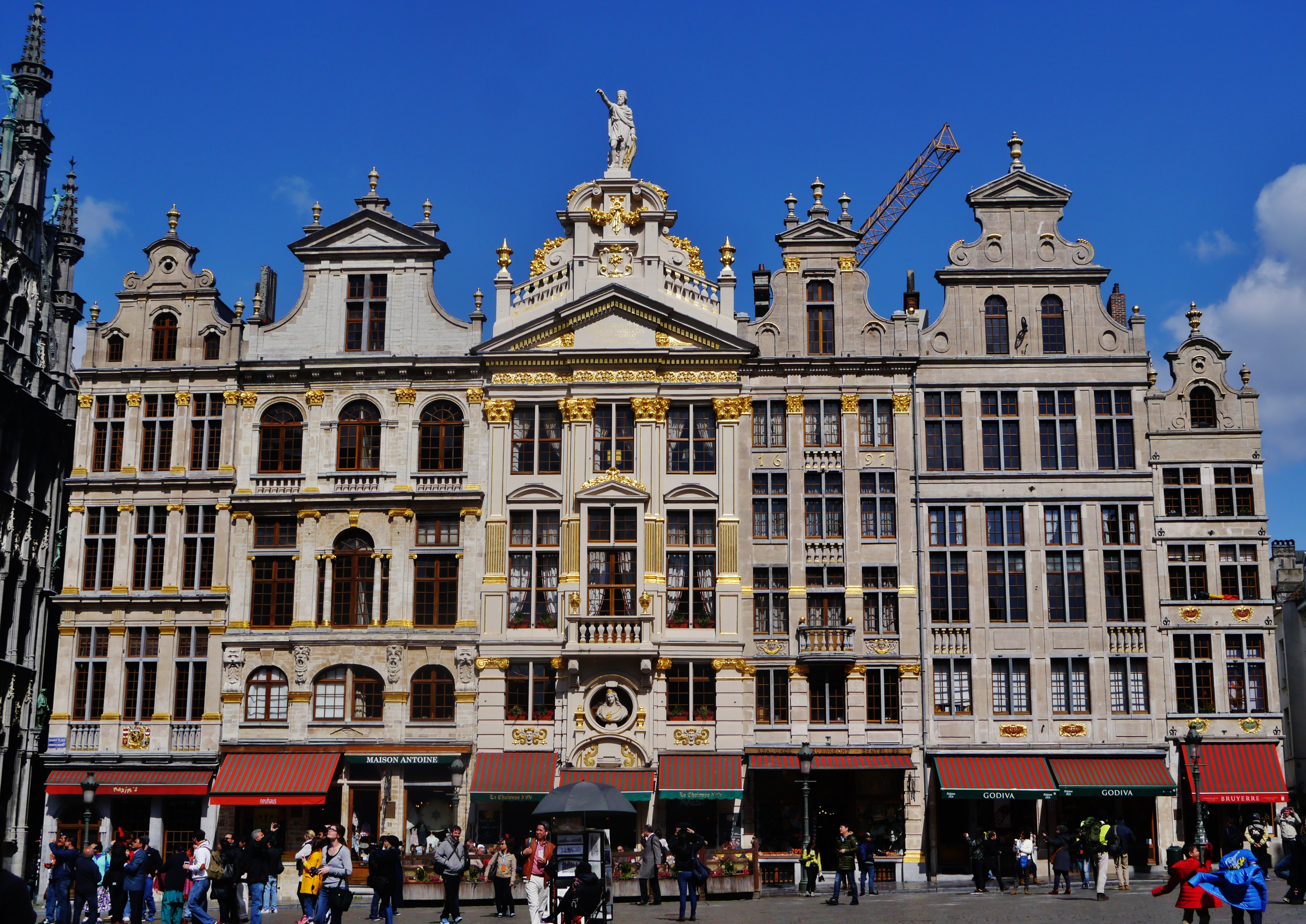
From right to left: Le Cerf, Joseph et Anne, L'Ange, La Chaloupe d'Or, Le Pigeon and Le Marchand d'Or

House no.	Illustration	Name	Original guild/function	Description
20		Le Cerf (Dutch: Den Hert or Het Heert; "The Deer")	Private house	Private house built after 1615. The façade was rebuilt in 1710 probably by the architect and owner Gilles Van den Eynde, and restored in 1896–1899 by Adolphe Samyn.
21–22		Joseph et Anne (Dutch: Joseph en Anna; "Joseph and Anne")	Private houses	Two private houses under a single façade. The gable, destroyed in the 19th century, was completely reconstructed in 1896–1899 by Adolphe Samyn after a watercolour by Ferdinand-Joseph De Rons from 1729.
23		L'Ange (Dutch: Den Engel; "The Angel")	Private house	Private house of the merchant Jan De Vos, rebuilt around 1697 after a drawing by Guillaume de Bruyn who restored the Italianate-Flemish style. The altered façade was completely rebuilt in 1896–1899 by Adolphe Samyn according to old images.
24–25		La Chaloupe d'Or (Dutch: Den Gulden Boot; "The Golden Boat")	House of the Corporation of Tailors	Designed in 1697 by Guillaume de Bruyn, restored in 1879–80 by Victor Jamaer and again in 1898–99 by Adolphe Samyn. It was originally made up of two houses: La Chaloupe (Dutch: De Boot; "The Boat") and La Taupe (Dutch: De Mol; "The Mole"), which the former Corporation of Tailors had acquired around 1500. It was destined to become the centre of a monumental façade covering the entire north-eastern side, which was refused by the owners of the neighbouring houses. It is capped by a statue of Saint Homobonus of Cremona, patron saint of tailors. The sculptures are the work of Peter van Dievoet. The current bust of Saint Barbara above the door is the work of Godefroid Van den Kerckhove (1872).
26–27		Le Pigeon (Dutch: De Duif; "The Dove")	House of the Corporation of Painters	Former property of the Corporation of Painters since the 15th century, who sold it in 1697 to the stonemason and architect Pierre Simons, considered to be the designer of the façade. It housed Victor Hugo during his stay in Brussels and was restored in 1901–1908 by Jean Segers.
28		Le Marchand d'Or (Dutch: De Gulden Koopman; "The Golden Merchant") or Aux Armes de Brabant (Dutch: De Wapens van Brabant; "The Arms of Brabant")	Private house	Private house of the tiler Corneille Mombaerts, built in 1709 probably by the stonemason Jacques Walckiers, and completely rebuilt in 1896–1899 by François Malfait.

== Between the Rue Chair et Pain/Vlees-en-Broodstraat and the Rue au Beurre/Boterstraat (north-west) ==
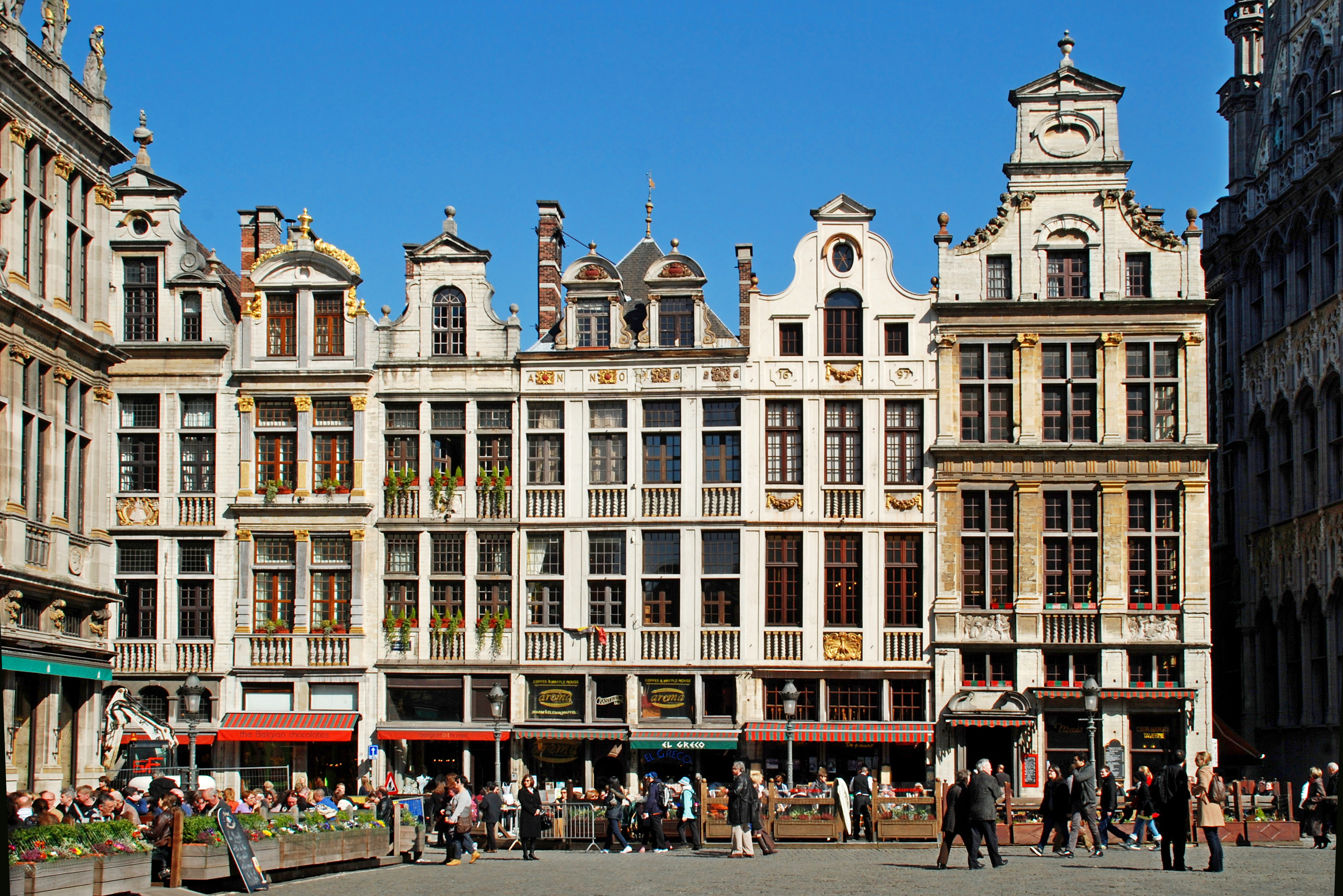
From right to left: Le Heaume, Le Paon, Le Petit Renard, Le Chêne, Sainte-Barbe and L'Âne

House no.	Illustration	Name	Original guild/function	Description
34		Le Heaume (Dutch: Den Helm; "The Helmet")	Private house	According to Guillaume Des Marez, the architect is Peter van Dievoet. Its façade was partially restored 1879 and again in 1916–1923.
35		Le Paon (Dutch: Den Pauw; "The Peacock")	Private house	Private house built in 1697, surmounted by a characteristic gable of 18th-century houses. It was restored in 1876–1895 by Victor Jamaer.
36–37		Le Petit Renard (Dutch: 't Voske; "The Little Fox") or Le Samaritain (Dutch: De Samaritaen; "The Samaritan") and Le Chêne (Dutch: Den Eycke; "The Oak")	Private houses	Two private houses dated 1696 and restored in 1883–1886 by Victor Jamaer.
38		Sainte-Barbe (Dutch: Sint Barbara; "Saint Barbara")	Private house	Private house built in 1696, whose façade was reconstructed in 1913–1920.
39		L'Âne (Dutch: Den Ezel; "The Donkey")	Private house	Private house built after 1695, whose façade was reconstructed in 1913–1920.
