= Sawdust carpet =

Religious street decoration

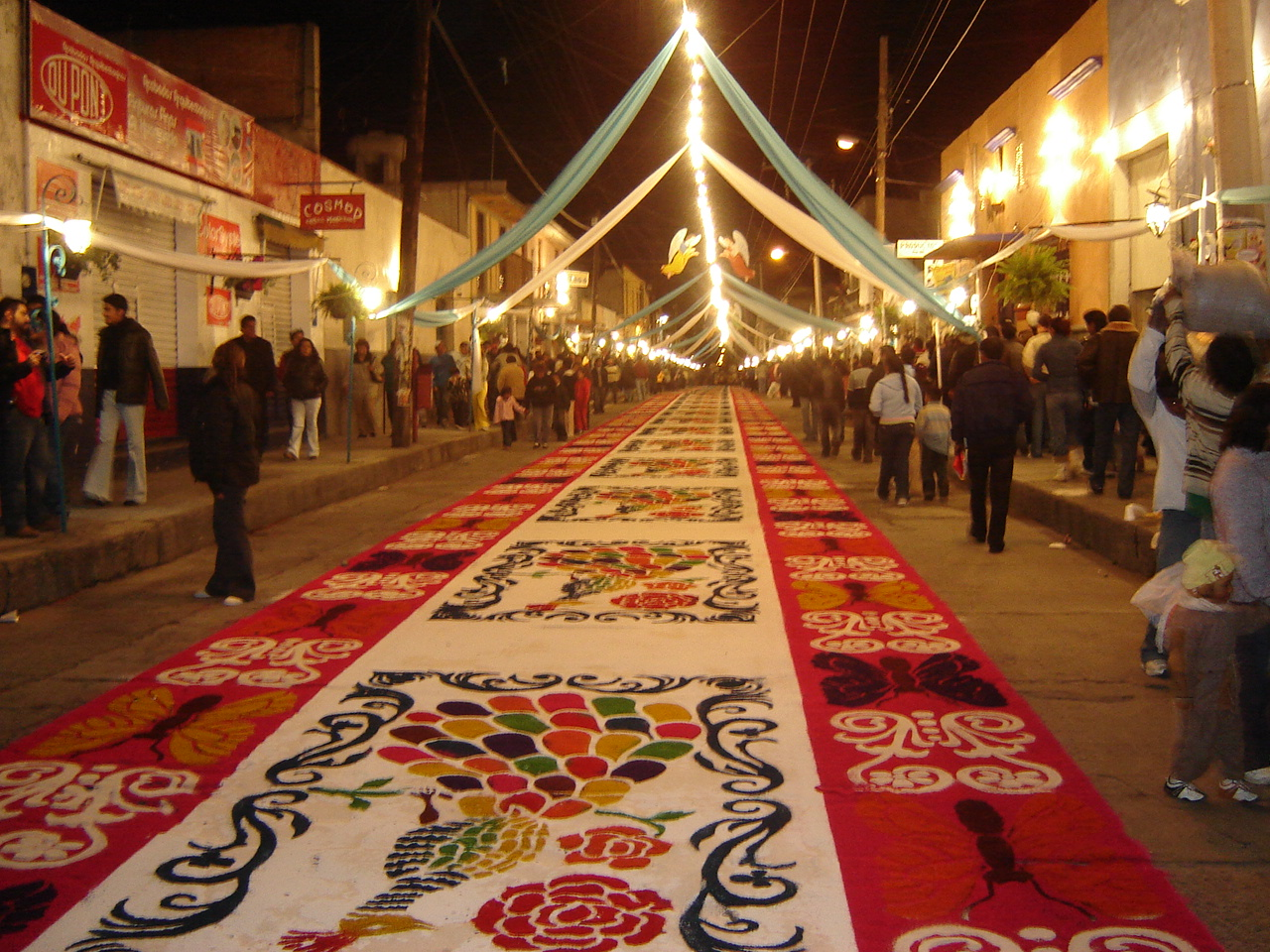
Sawdust carpet made during "The night no one sleeps" in Huamantla, Tlaxcala

Sawdust carpets (Spanish: tapetes de aserrín Portuguese: tapetes de serragem) are one or more layers of colored sawdust, and sometimes other additional materials, laid on the ground as decoration. Sawdust carpets are traditionally created to greet a religious procession that walks over them. The tradition of decorating streets in this fashion began in Europe and was brought to the Americas by the Spanish. The tradition is still found in Mexico, Central America, parts of South America and parts of the United States, but it is strongest in Mexico and Central America.

The most traditional use of these carpets is for processions related to Holy Week in Mexico and Central America (especially in Sutiaba, León, Nicaragua, Antigua Guatemala and Sonsonate, El Salvador) and Corpus Christi in the United States. In Mexico, their use has been extended to processions dedicated to patron saints, especially in Huamantla, Tlaxcala and Huajuapan de León, Oaxaca as well as to Day of the Dead, especially in central Mexico.

Sawdust carpets are also made in Egypt, and referred to by the same term (though in Arabic). They are likely not a related tradition.

== Creation ==
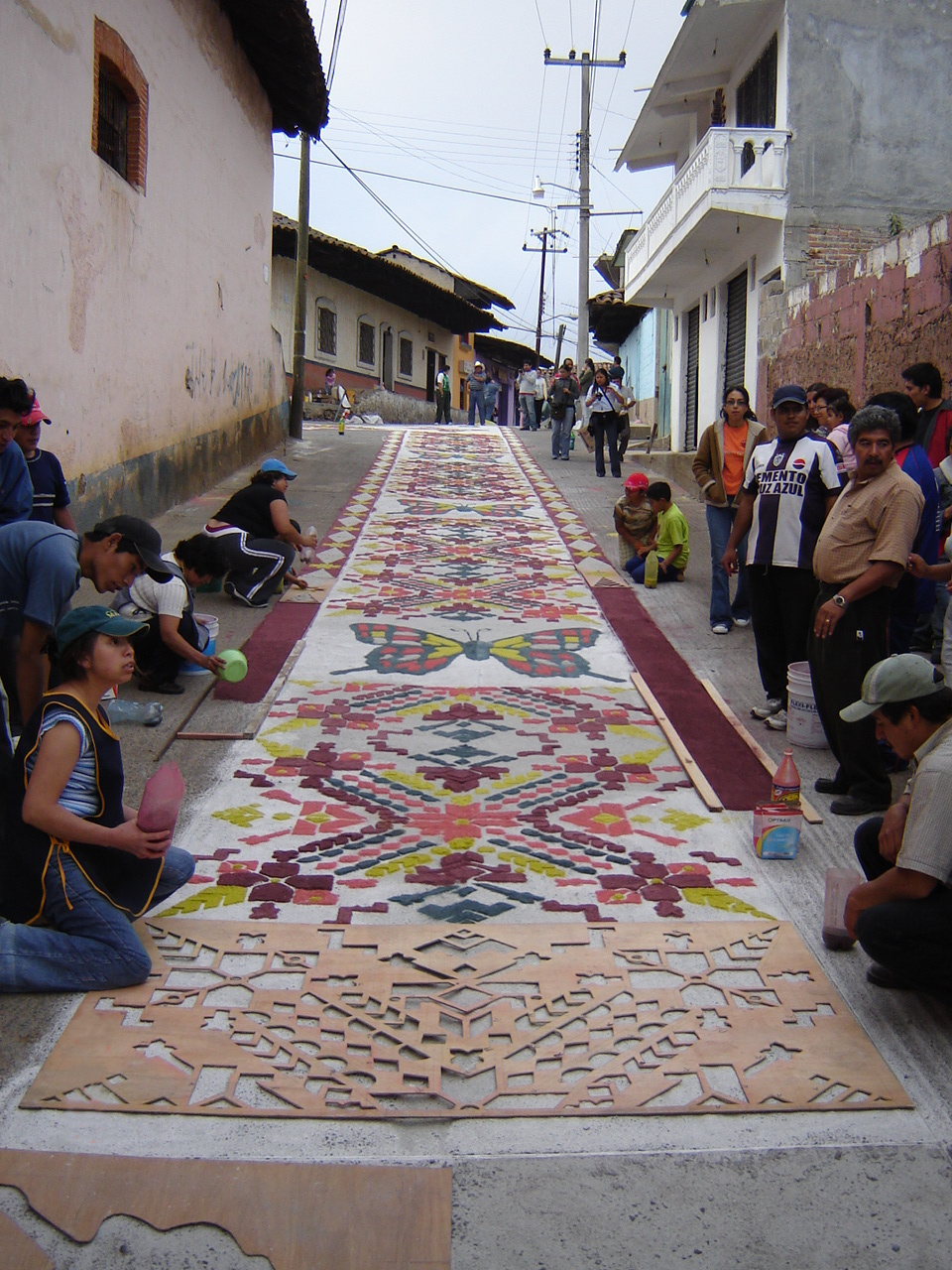
Carpet in progress in Acaxochitlán, Hidalgo.

Traditional carpets in Mexico and Central America are done with colored and uncolored sawdust; however, various other materials are used with it and sometimes in place of it. These include flowers and flower petals, pine needles, rice, fruit, colored earth, ashes and other usually organic materials. The sawdust is cleaned, soaked in water with dye then set out to dry. In the past natural dyes such as indigo, almond shells etc. were used but today most use commercial dyes. The finer and more compact the sawdust the smoother the finished work.

Most traditional carpets begin with a layer of undyed sawdust spread in a wood frame to smooth out rough surfaces such as stone paved streets and then sprayed with a light coating of water. Sometimes other materials such as sand are used for the base. Then the designs are laid over top. On smooth streets and other surfaces, the design can be drawn in chalk and filled in with the coloring materials. There are two ways to create the design, with the use of molds or stencils and freehand, sprinkling and placing the colored material. Freehand takes longer and requires more skill with the use of molds allowing for very defined and complicated designs. After the carpet is finished, it received a very light spray of water to affix the sawdust in place and keep the colors from fading.

== History ==
The tradition has its origins in the feast of Corpus Christi in Santa Cruz de Tenerife. There the streets were adorned with flowers and sand, becoming more elaborate over the Middle Ages. The making of the carpets was then extended to Good Friday with images related to that day, Christ on the Cross and a grieving Virgin Mary. The Spanish brought the custom to Latin America and it was established during the colonial period as part of Holy Week celebration, especially to welcome Good Friday and Easter processions of religious icons carried through the streets. One of the reasons these were promoted was didactic, with the images telling the story of the Passion of Christ and other scenes from his life. They were accepted by the indigenous populations especially in Mexico and parts of Guatemala as it was similar to traditions of laying fruit in honor of the gods of the harvest and carpets made from feathers of exotic birds such as hummingbirds, macaws and quetzals.

Today, the making of sawdust carpets is found in Mexico, various Central American countries Honduras, Brazil and Peru. The carpets are made in some Catholic parishes of the United States. In Corpus Christi, Texas and Pittsburgh, Pennsylvania, the tradition was brought by Holy Ghost Fathers arriving from Germany. Due to concerns about preserving the tradition, in Nicaragua in 2000, a technique to create permanent designs in sawdust was created. Exhibitions of these permanent works have been held in Sutiaba, Managua and Antigua Guatemala. These have been created with both religious and secular motifs such as landscapes and still lifes. In 2011 the Honduran Embassy in the United States held an exhibition of various carpets at an event to commemorate Holy Week.

Traditionally the sawdust afterwards is burned or thrown in rivers which causes environmental problems. For this reason some organizations adopt alternatives to sawdust. One example of this is students from Colegio Cedros Norte in Mexico City, who make the carpets for Corpus Christi using grass mats and flower petals, which is more biodegradable.

The Pittsburgh Corpus Christi carpets are dyed with environmentally safe dyes and the sawdust is traditionally re-gathered for use in church gardens.

== Significant traditions using the craft ==
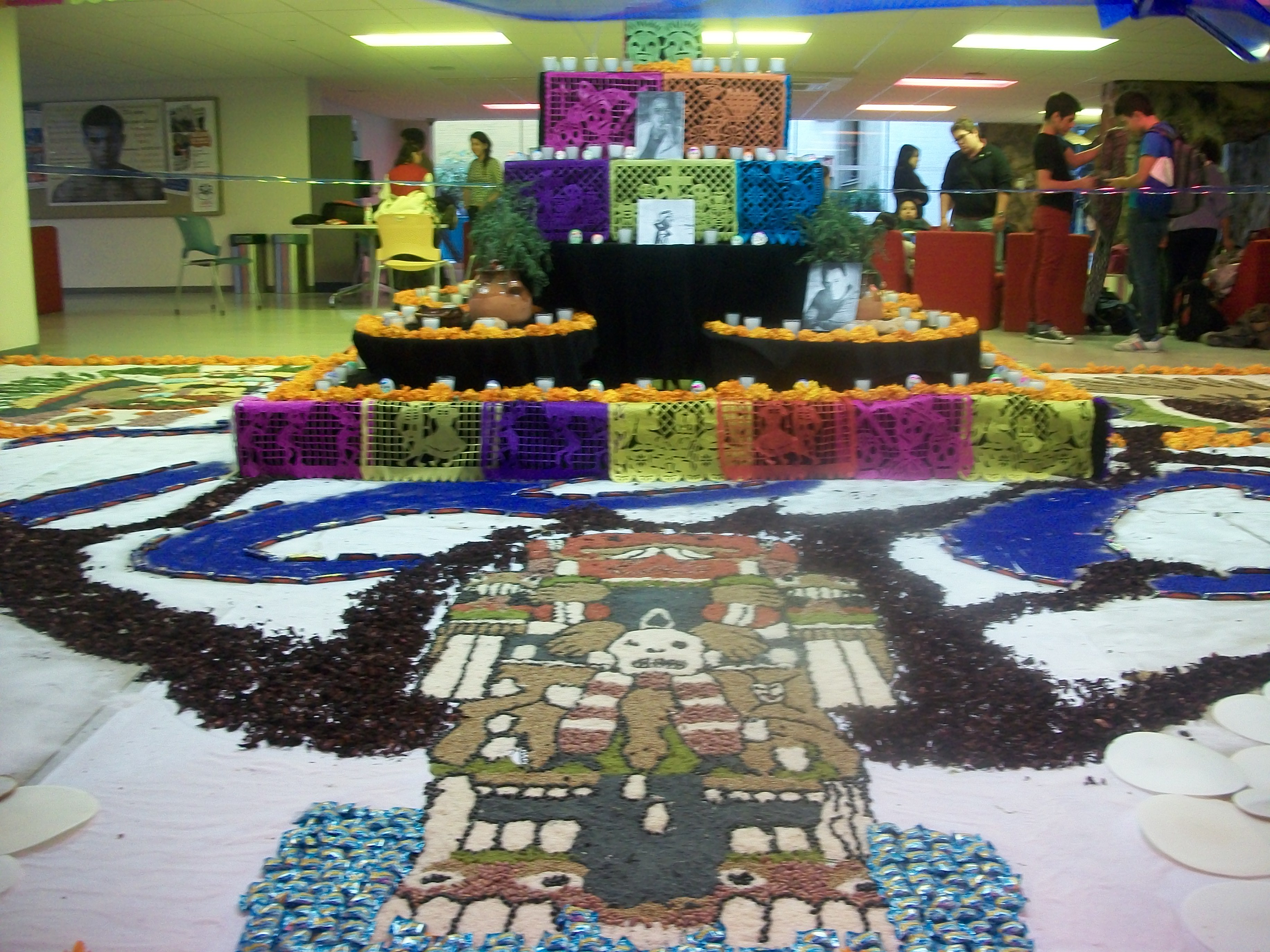
Day of the Dead altar with sawdust carpet depicting the god Tlaloc at ITESM Campus Ciudad de México.

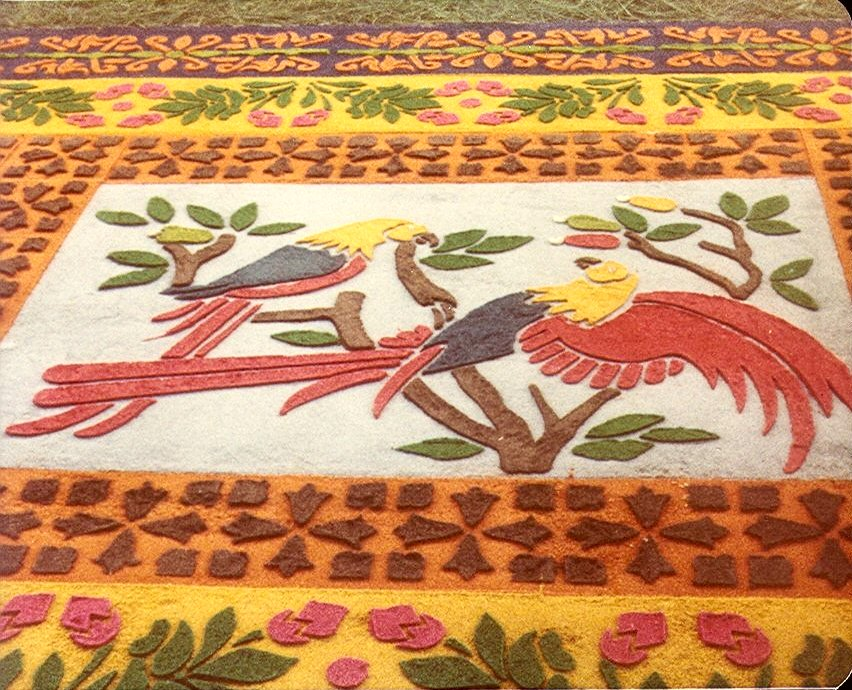
Part of a carpet made for Holy Week in Antigua Guatemala

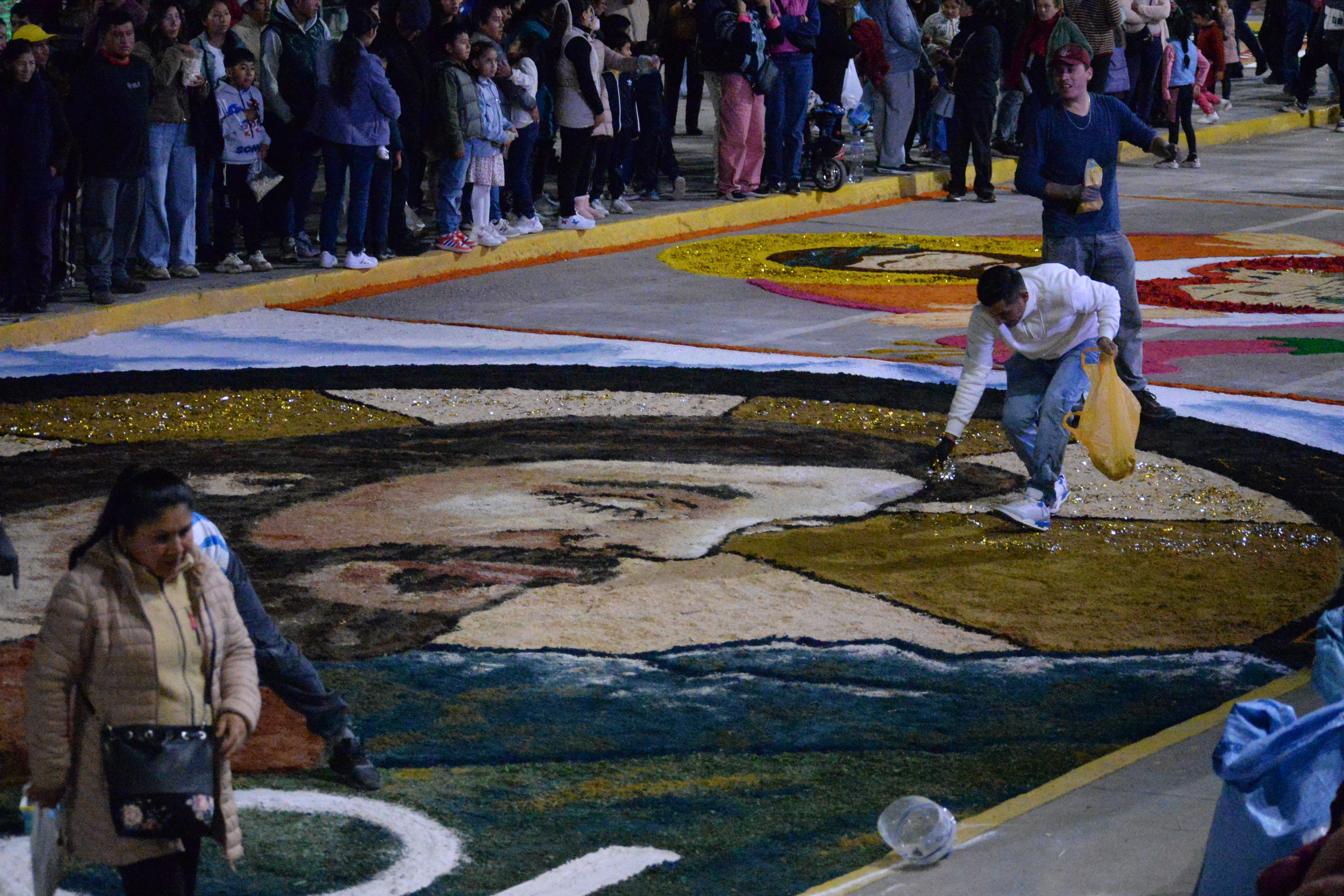
Sawdust carpet of Jesus Christ being created on Good Friday in Urubamba, Peru.

The largest event which features sawdust carpets in Mexico is in Huamantla, Tlaxcala. The carpets are part of the Feria de Huamantla which extend over the month of August. All month the artisans create carpets in the atrium of the Basilica, the sanctuary of the city's most important image the Nuestra Señora de la Caridad (Our Lady of Charity). Each of these are about forty m2 and change each day, and dedicated to the Virgin Mary image. However, the most important events occurs from 14 to 15 August. Since 1941, Nuestra Señora de la Caridad leaves its sanctuary in a procession that wanders for eight km around the streets of the city. The entire procession route is covered in carpets made of sawdust and other materials. The carpets are created the night before during what is called “La noche que nadie duerme” (The night no one sleeps) then trampled by the procession of the image in the early morning hours of the 15th. The carpets are organized and made by committees organized by the various neighborhoods. The procession and the carpets draw about 300,000 visitors each year.

The making of these sawdust carpets have led to the town and some of its artisans being more widely known. One noted creator from Huamantla is Efrén Chacón, who not only participates in Huamantla each year, but has also traveled all over Mexico and to countries such as Spain, Italy, Canada and Japan to give exhibitions and talks. His work with the carpets earned Efren Chacon a chance to meet Pope John Paul II when he and 222 other artisans worked to create a carpet with the image of the Pope with the Virgin Mary using sawdust and flowers. He has received recognition for his work from Japan, Canada, Switzerland, Italy, El Salvador, Guatemala and the United States. In 2008, artisans in Huamantla also created a carpet 150 meters long and six meters wide with a design to honor the United Nations for its 63rd anniversary.

The tradition of making these carpets for patron saint processions has spread to other areas of Mexico. They are now made in the city of Tlaxcala for the procession of the Virgin Mary image of Octolán, and for the feast of the Apostle Peter on 29 June in San Pedro Xalostoc, near Ecatepec, State of Mexico . Huajuapan de León creates carpets for the procession of the Señor de los Corazones, a black Christ figure, on 24 July which extend over five kilometers on the city's streets. Although the tradition was adopted from that of Huamantla, Huajuapan since has developed its own characteristics such as the designs on the carpet. These include Mixtec fretwork, images from pre Hispanic codices and regional color schemes. The event draws over 10,000 visitors along the procession route.

The tradition of making carpets with sawdust and other materials has since been extended to include Day of the Dead in Mexico, especially for large institutional altars called ofrendas and ofrendas to honor important people such as a one for writer Carlos Fuentes who died in 2012. Day of the Dead carpets can accompany a traditional ofrenda on a table or can be the entire ofrenda. These are most commonly made in the central part of Mexico. In Azcapotzalco in Mexico City, large carpets are made with sawdust along with marigold petals, corn, salt and candles for Day of the Dead. These include many made by primary school children. Since 2007 carpets dedicated to Day of the Dead are made in Guanajuato, for the festival "El Tapete de la Muerte". However, the tradition has spread as far south as Teotitlán de Flores Magón, Oaxaca where they are made to honor the saints and Cancún as part of their Day of the Dead festivities. They have been created as far north as Monterrey, where one large carpet/ofrenda surrounded by 300 candles was made to commemorate the victims of a massacre at the city's Casino Royale .

In Central America, two noted events that feature the carpets is the community of Sutiaba in the municipality of León, Nicaragua and in Antigua Guatemala, both of which maintain the original purpose of use during Holy Week. Sutiaba is an indigenous community whose tradition dates back at least to 19th century according to written record. The carpets are made on what is called the Calle de Las Alfombras (Street of the Carpets) in the indigenous community of Sutiaba, meters from the San Juan de Dios de Sutiaba church. The carpets are created between Monday and Friday during Holy Week for the Good Friday procession. Each section takes about five to six hours with two to six people working on it depending on the complexity. Nicaraguan artist Federico Quezada has worked to preserve the sawdust carpet traditions of Sutiaba.

Another area famous for its carpets is Antigua Guatemala as it has mixed Catholic and indigenous images since the colonial period. Antigua Guatemala carpets are generally made using molds with allegoric designs, religious symbols, Biblical scenes, geometric shapes and floral designs with entire families working together using sawdust, pine needles, fruit, flowers, sand and cut paper. The carpets and processions in Antigua, Guatemala draw about 200,000 tourists from the country and abroad.

In Catalonia, a similar tradition is called the Festa de les Enramades d'Arbúcies (Feast of the Bowers) related to Corpus Christi, which was declared a national heritage in 1999. The tradition has been traced as far back as 1589. The Feast of the Bowers is eight days of festivities along with preparation days before when people collect large quantities of flowers and other materials to make carpets for the streets alone with tree branches. The color is mostly provided by the flowers. The elaborate decorations are then walked over by a parade of floats and other festive elements.

== See also ==
- Flower carpet
- Sandpainting
- Sand mandala
