= Flower Carpet (Brussels) =

Biennial event in Brussels, Belgium

Coordinates: 50°50′48″N 4°21′9″E

Flower Carpet: Tapis de Fleurs (French); Bloementapijt (Dutch)
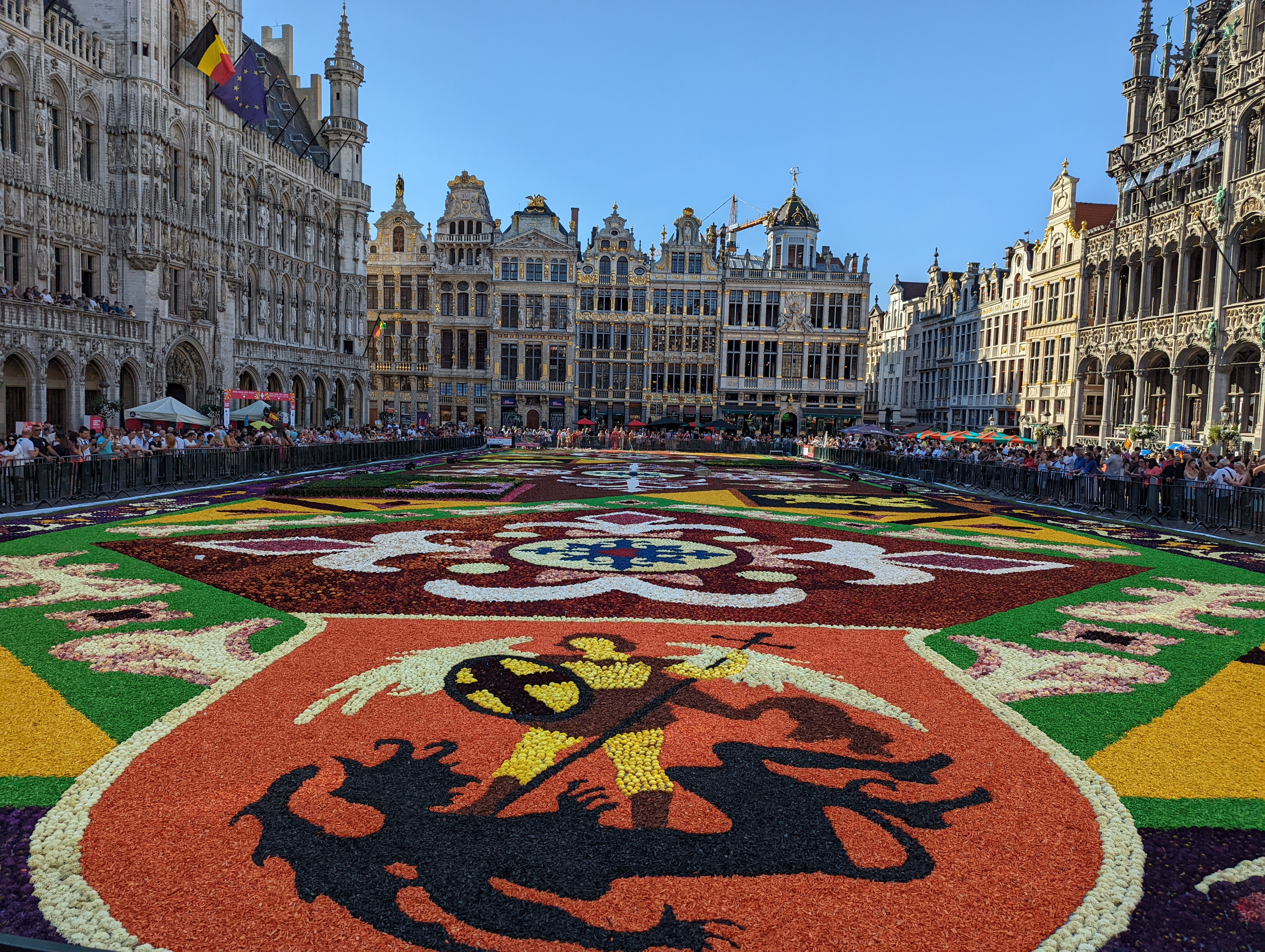
- Flower Carpet at the Grand-Place/Grote Markt
- Status: Active
- Frequency: Biennial
- Locations: City of Brussels, Brussels-Capital Region
- Country: Belgium
- Inaugurated: 1971
- Most recent: 16 August 2026
- Next event: August 2028
- Website: www.flowercarpet.be/en

The Flower Carpet (French: Tapis de Fleurs; Dutch: Bloementapijt) is a biennial event in Brussels in which volunteers from around Belgium convene at the Grand-Place/Grote Markt, the historic centre of the city, to weave a carpet-like tapestry out of colourful begonias or dahlias. The event takes place every other August, coordinating with Assumption Day, and lasts for three to four days. A different theme is chosen for each edition.

== History ==
The first Flower Carpet was created in Brussels in 1971 by the Ghent landscape architect Etienne Stautemans in an effort to advertise his work, and due to its popularity, the tradition continued in subsequent years. The non-profit association Tapis de Fleurs de Bruxelles was then created at the initiative of the College of Mayors and Aldermen of the City of Brussels in cooperation with the Province of Brabant and Les Franc-Bourgeois (a central Brussels traders' association). The new association laid down the regulations: the event was to be held every two years, for three to four days on the weekend of 15 August, and could be enhanced by sound and lighting, fireworks, a jazz concert and other traditional folk entertainments.

Starting in 1986, the event has been regularly held biannually, each time under a different theme, with the Flower Carpet now estimated to attract between 150,000 and 200,000 local and international visitors. In 2020, the Flower Carpet was included in the inventory of intangible cultural heritage of the Brussels-Capital Region. An application is ongoing to recognise the Flower Carpet as a Masterpiece of the Oral and Intangible Heritage of Humanity by UNESCO.

== Description ==
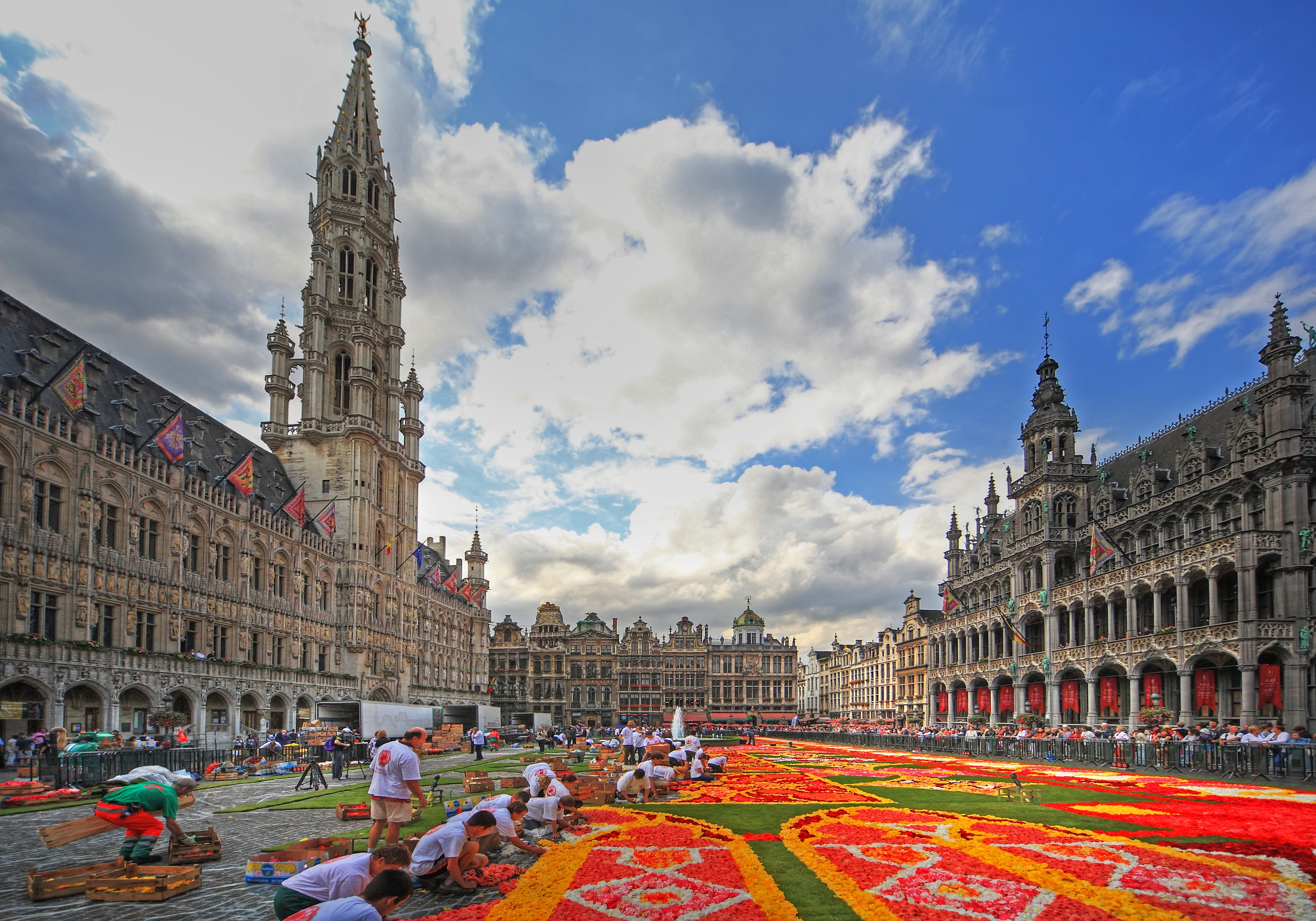
Volunteers create the Flower Carpet tapestry

The Flower Carpet is composed mainly of tuberous begonias (Begonia tuberosa grandiflora), one of Belgium's major exports since 1860, and occasionally dahlias. The choice of the begonia is not accidental. This hardy flower brings beauty and vivid colours to the carpet. It originated in the Antilles and can withstand different meteorological conditions, such as strong sun, wind, rain, or cold.

Despite the fact that the laying of the carpet on the square is carried out in one day, preparation work already starts two years prior. The subject will first need to be chosen: the commemoration of great events, a country, a region, or other celebrations, then the work will proceed in stages. The model of the carpet, then the model with real dimensions (24 by 77 metres (79 by 253 ft)), the number of flowers and their sizes will be determined before being grown.

On the day of the event, about 120 volunteers are needed to set up, on a life-size drawing of the transparent and micro-perforated plastic mat, the decoration of grasses and bark where the flowers will be placed, produced on special order by horticulturists from the Ghent region in East Flanders. About 500,000 to 750,000 flowers are required to create the ephemeral 1,800 m^{2} (19,000 sq ft) carpet (approximately 300 flowers per m^{2}), which takes between four and eight hours of work to complete. This multicoloured tapestry can be admired from the balcony of the Town Hall, which is open to visitors, in exchange for a small fee.

== Themes ==
Each year of the Flower Carpet, organisers select a theme for inspiration. Theses themes are carefully chosen with reference to the history of Belgium and especially Brussels, highlighting its role within Europe and the international community, whether by commemorating events (e.g. thematic years, European presidency, etc.) or by honouring a host country (e.g. France, Turkey, Japan, Mexico, etc.).

- In 1971, the carpet's first theme was "Arabesques". An arabesque is an ornament made of stylised, repeated and artistically intertwined plants.
- In 1976, the carpet's second theme was "Year of the Landscapes, Parks and Gardens".
- In 1979, the millennium of Brussels was celebrated with a third carpet representing the patron saint of the City of Brussels, Saint Michael, accompanied by the contemporary Latin name of Brussels, Bruoscella.
- In 1980, to celebrate Belgium's 150th anniversary, the carpet was adorned with the coat of arms of Belgium.
- In 1986, the carpet featured the coat of arms of the City of Brussels, with Saint Michael slaying the devil, wreathed with the Latin inscription Bruxella Civitas Brabantiae.
- In 1988, the pattern was inspired by the carpets of the Chinese province of Xinjiang.
- In 1990, the carpet was dedicated to Wolfgang Amadeus Mozart to commemorate the "Year of Mozart", the 200th anniversary of the composer's death.
- In 1992, the carpet celebrated the role of the City of Brussels in the European Community, as well as the 500th anniversary of the discovery of America by Christopher Colombus.
- In 1994, to mark the 50th anniversary of the liberation of Brussels, the carpet was dedicated to the liberators, with the bearings of the two British regiments and the Brigade Piron, the First Belgian Independent Group, appearing alongside the arms of Brussels.
- In 1996, the carpet was conceived as a French formal garden with designs inspired by the Flemish Renaissance.
- In 1998, the carpet was inspired by the geometrical scalloped designs on the rugs of the semi-nomadic tribes of north-eastern Turkey.
- In 2000, to celebrate the new millennium and to pay homage to the City of Brussels, the carpet represented an ancient inlaid table covered with a table runner in Brussels lace.
- In 2002, the carpet was reminiscent of the gardens of the Palace of Versailles and was embellished with fountains.
- In 2004, the carpet drew inspiration from Art Nouveau. Brussels was one of the major European cities for the development of the style in the 1890s and early 1900s.
- In 2006, the carpet had as theme the Middle Ages and alchemy, as the buildings on the Grand-Place have their roots in this period.
- In 2008, the carpet was inspired by the Savonnerie manufactory, the most prestigious European manufactory of knotted-pile carpets, represented through 18th-century French designs and colours.
- In 2010, the carpet honoured the Belgian presidency of the European Union and Herman Van Rompuy, the first President of the European Council, with images of historic Belgian symbols alongside the EU logo.
- In 2012, the carpet exhibited the colours of Africa, inspired by traditional fabrics, tribal costumes and pre-colonial shields.
- In 2014, the carpet paid tribute to the 50th anniversary of Turkish immigrants by imitating the world-famous kilims. Turks came to Belgium in 1964 when both countries signed a bilateral treaty welcoming immigrants during the economic boom.
- In 2016, the carpet displayed a Japanese design to celebrate 150 years of friendship between Belgium and Japan.
- In 2018, the carpet featured cultural elements from the Mexican state of Guanajuato, including symbolism from the Chupícuaro, Otomí and Purépecha cultures. In addition to the begonias, the carpet included dahlias, the national flower of Mexico.
- In 2020, the event was cancelled due to the COVID-19 pandemic in Belgium.
- In 2022, to mark the event's 50th anniversary and 22nd edition, the pattern was a nod to the first design from 1971. All the elements of this first design were present, including Saint Michael and the Leo Belgicus.
- In 2024, the carpet departed from tradition, featuring Campine dahlias instead of the usual begonias. The pattern was inspired by street art and used the metaphor of the plant rhizome to illustrate Brussels' diversity and the interconnection between its districts.
- In 2026, the carpet depicted The Great Wave off Kanagawa to commemorate 160 years of diplomatic relations and friendship between Belgium and Japan.

== Gallery ==
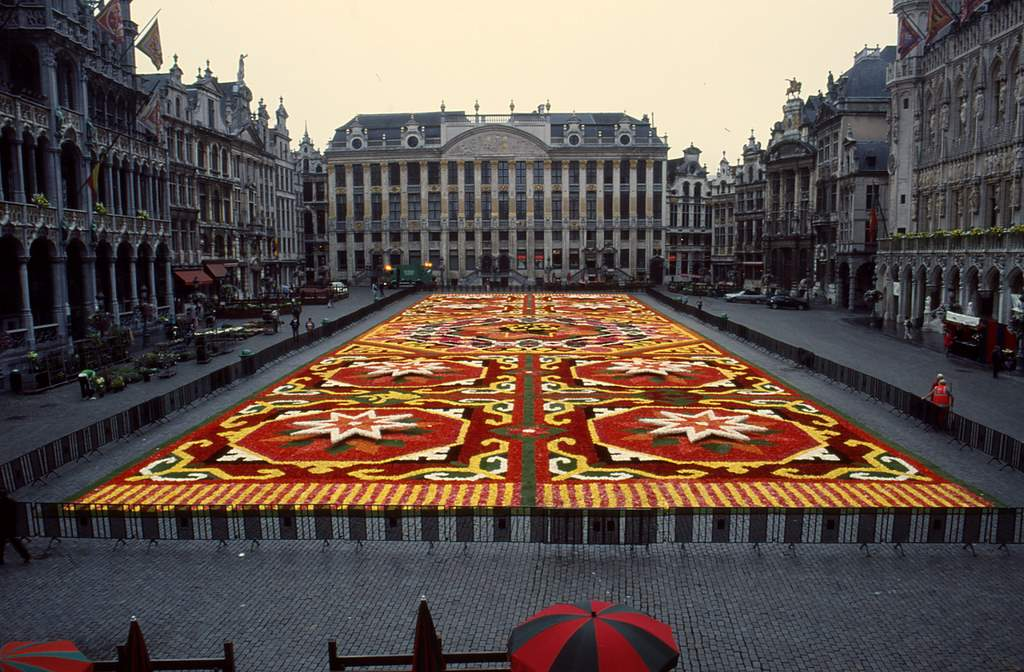
Flower Carpet 2008

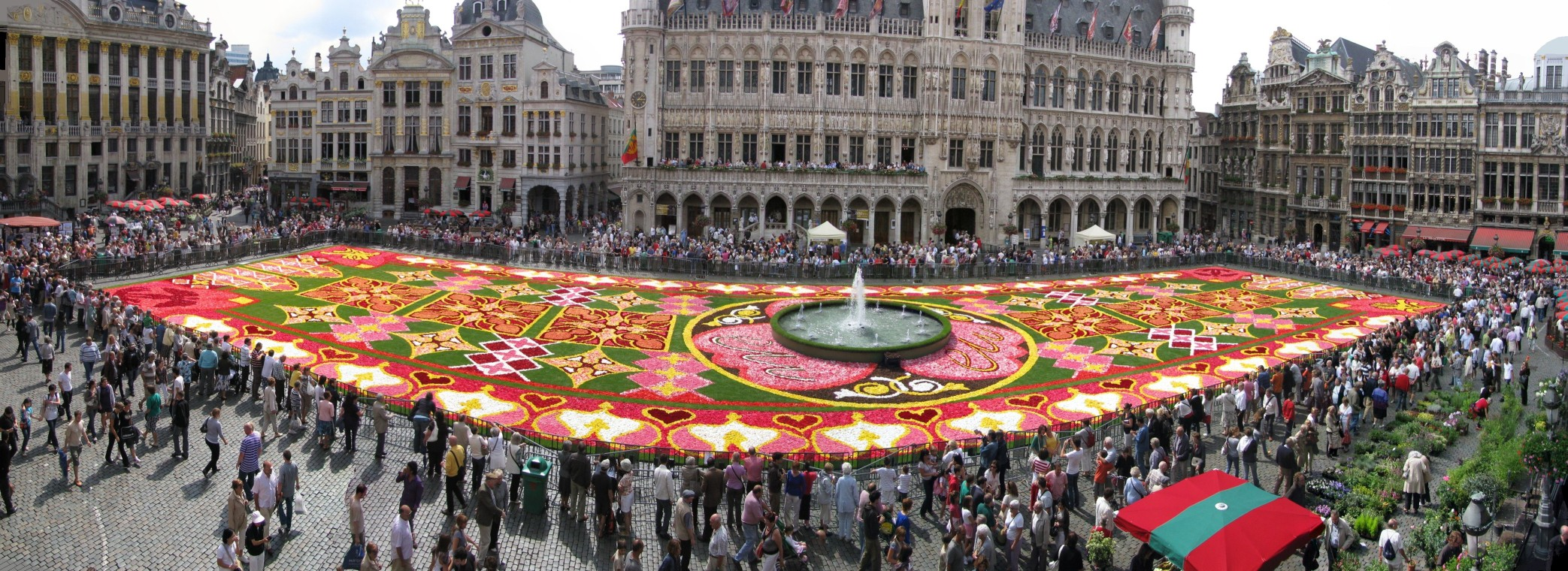
Flower Carpet 2010

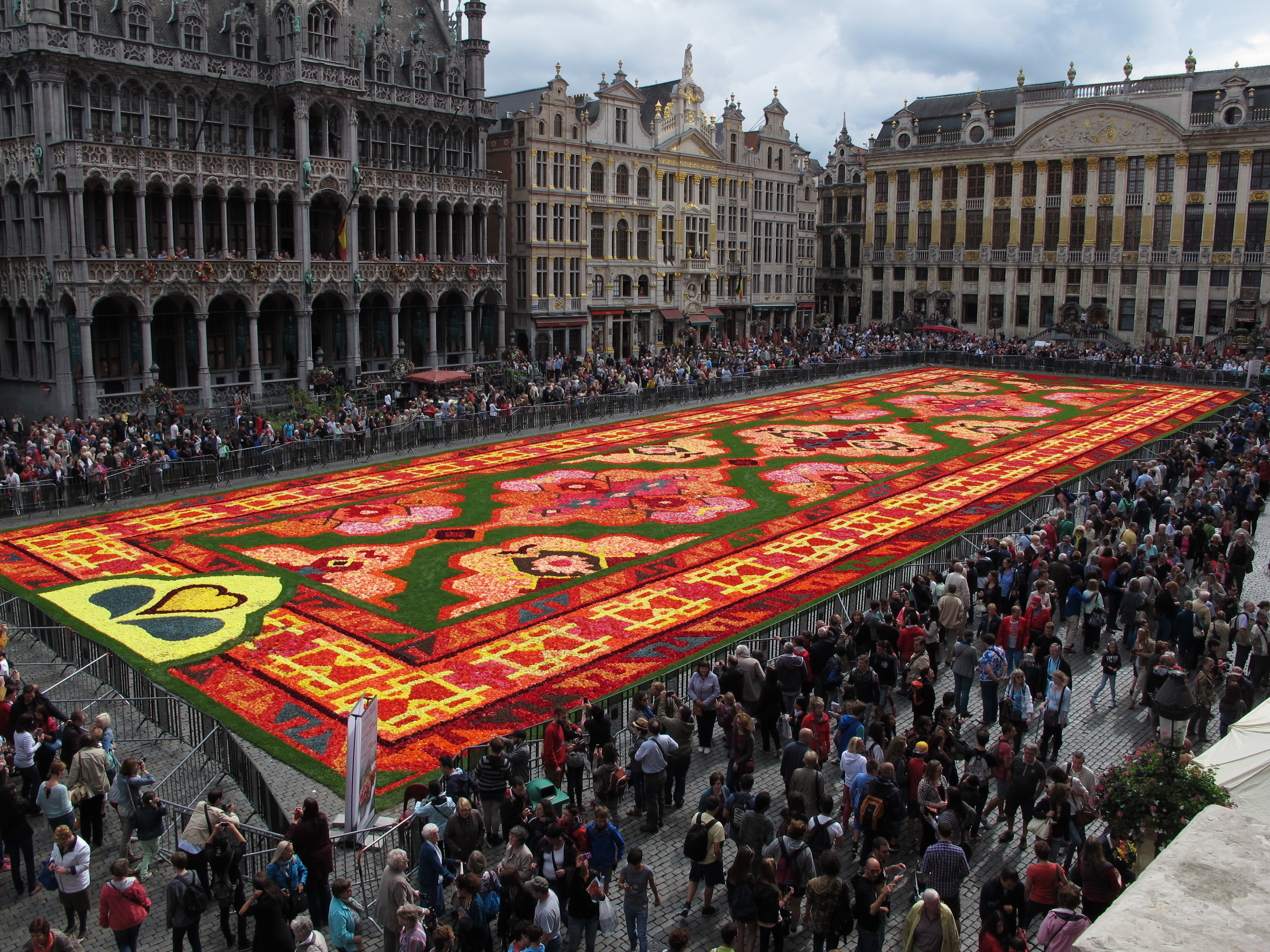
Flower Carpet 2014

Flower Carpet 2016

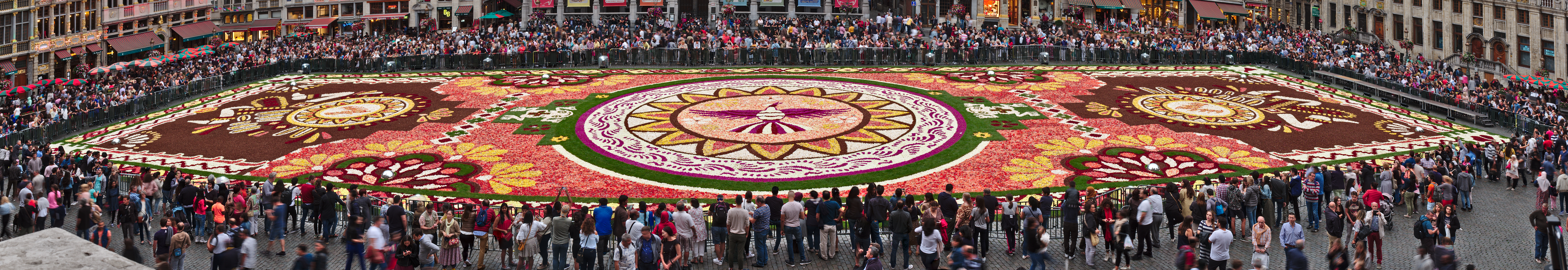
Flower Carpet 2018

== See also ==
- Flower carpet
- History of Brussels
- Culture of Belgium
