= Flower carpet =

Carpet made of flowers arranged in patterns

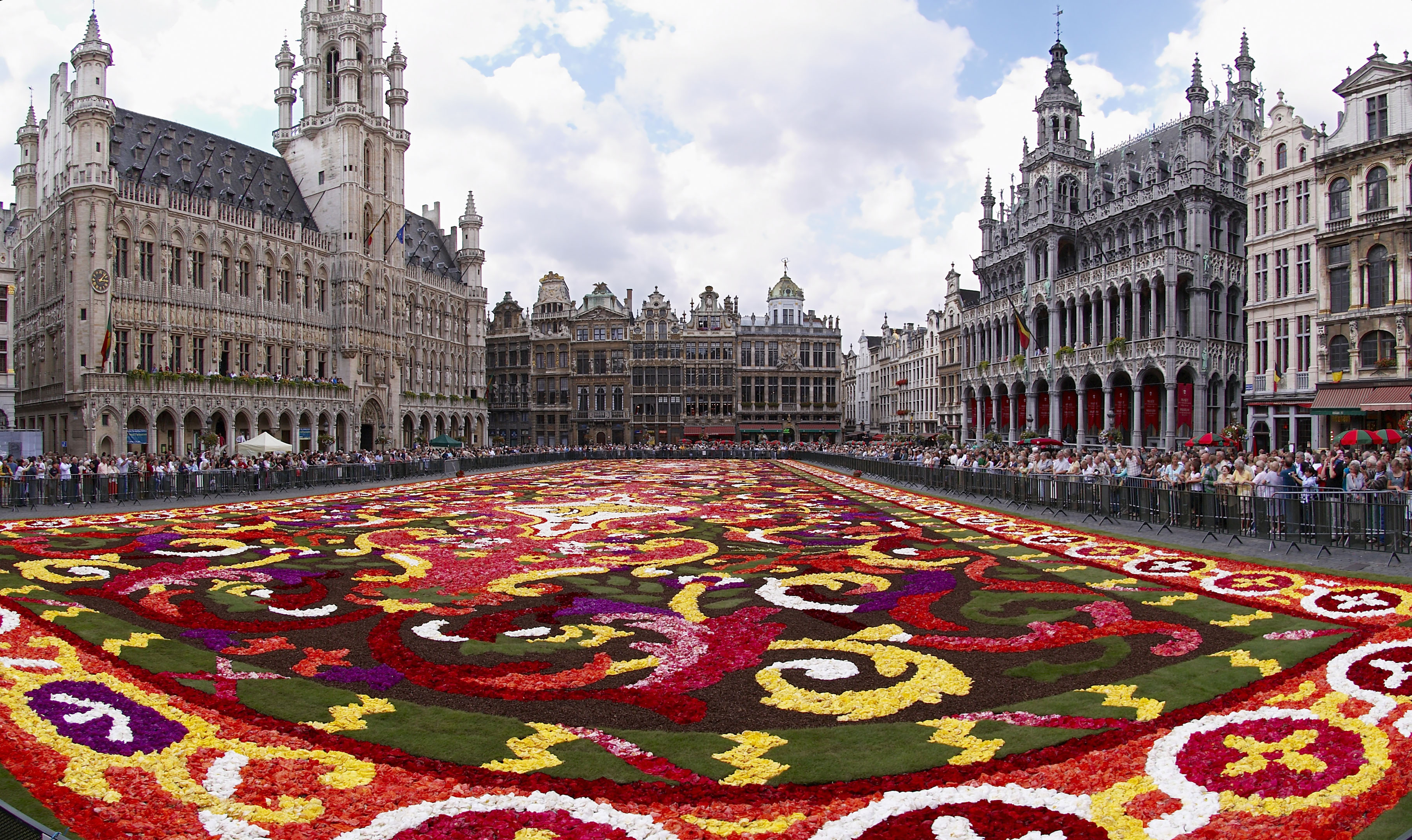
The Flower Carpet on the Grand-Place/Grote Markt (main square) in Brussels

A flower carpet (Note: German: blumenteppich, French: tapis de fleurs, Dutch: bloementapijt, Spanish: alfombra de flores, Italian: infiorata, Malayalam: പൂക്കളം or pookkalam) is a design made on the ground with flowers or flower petals arranged in patterns. Flower carpet events take place in many places around the world.

== Examples ==
One of the most popular flower carpet events is the Flower Carpet biennial in Brussels in which volunteers from around Belgium convene at the Grand-Place/Grote Markt, the historic centre of the city, to weave a carpet-like tapestry out of colourful begonias or dahlias. The event takes place every other August, coordinating with Assumption Day, and lasts for three to four days. Nearly a million flowers are required to create the ephemeral 1,800 m^{2} (19,000 sq ft) carpet.

The Guinness World Record for the largest flower carpet of the world is held by Jardines of Mexico, in Teotihuacan, where an 18,000 m^{2} (190,000 sq ft) flower carpet was made on 8 December 2018.

Carpets of live flowers are arranged for the Feast of Corpus Christi in Spycimierz, Klucz, Olszowa, Zalesie Śląskie, Zimna Wódka in Poland. The tradition was inscribed on UNESCO Representative List of the Intangible Cultural Heritage of Humanity in 2021. and the Onam festival in Kerala, India.

== Gallery ==
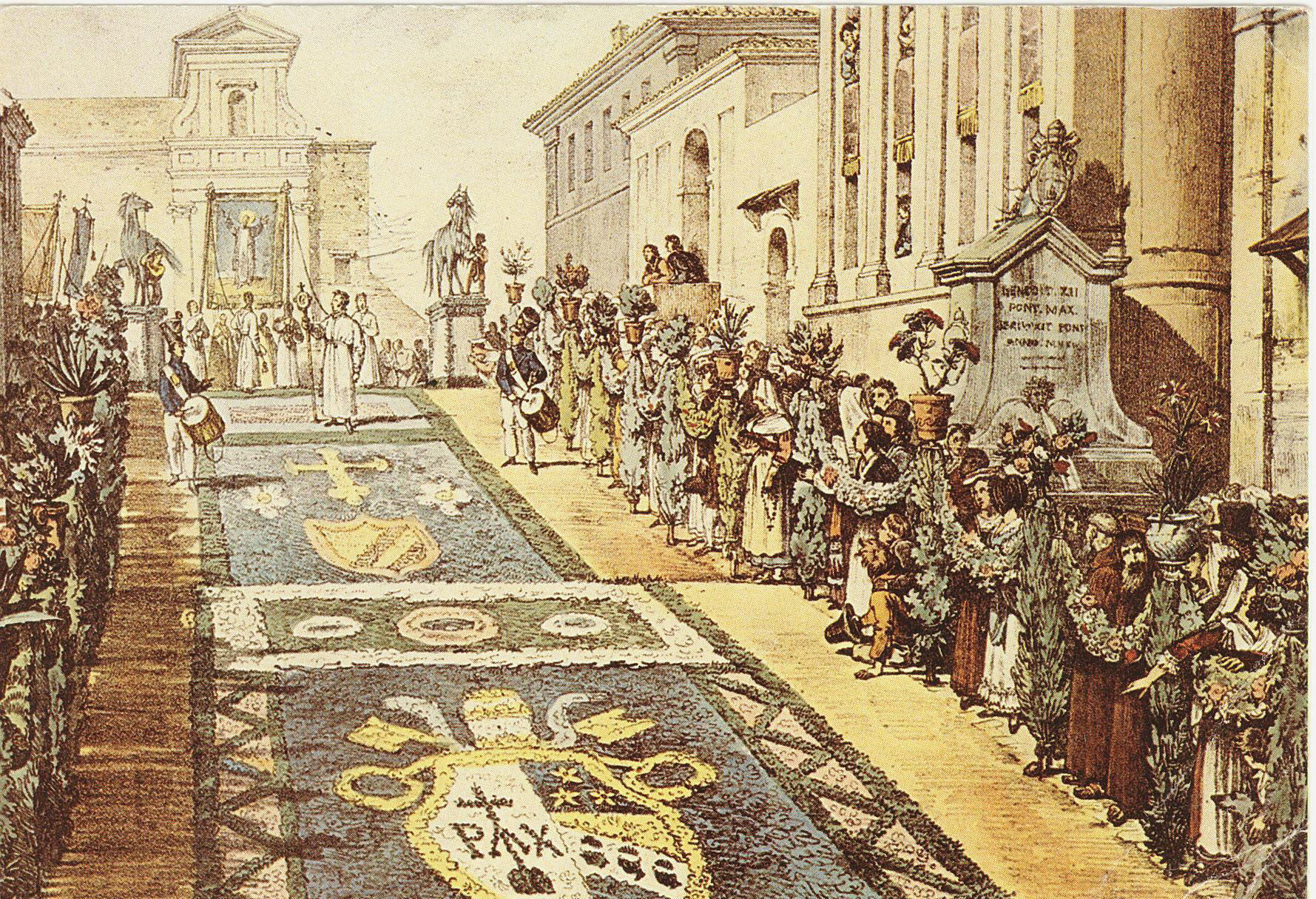
Infiorata à Genzano, Antoine-Jean-Baptiste Thomas, 1817

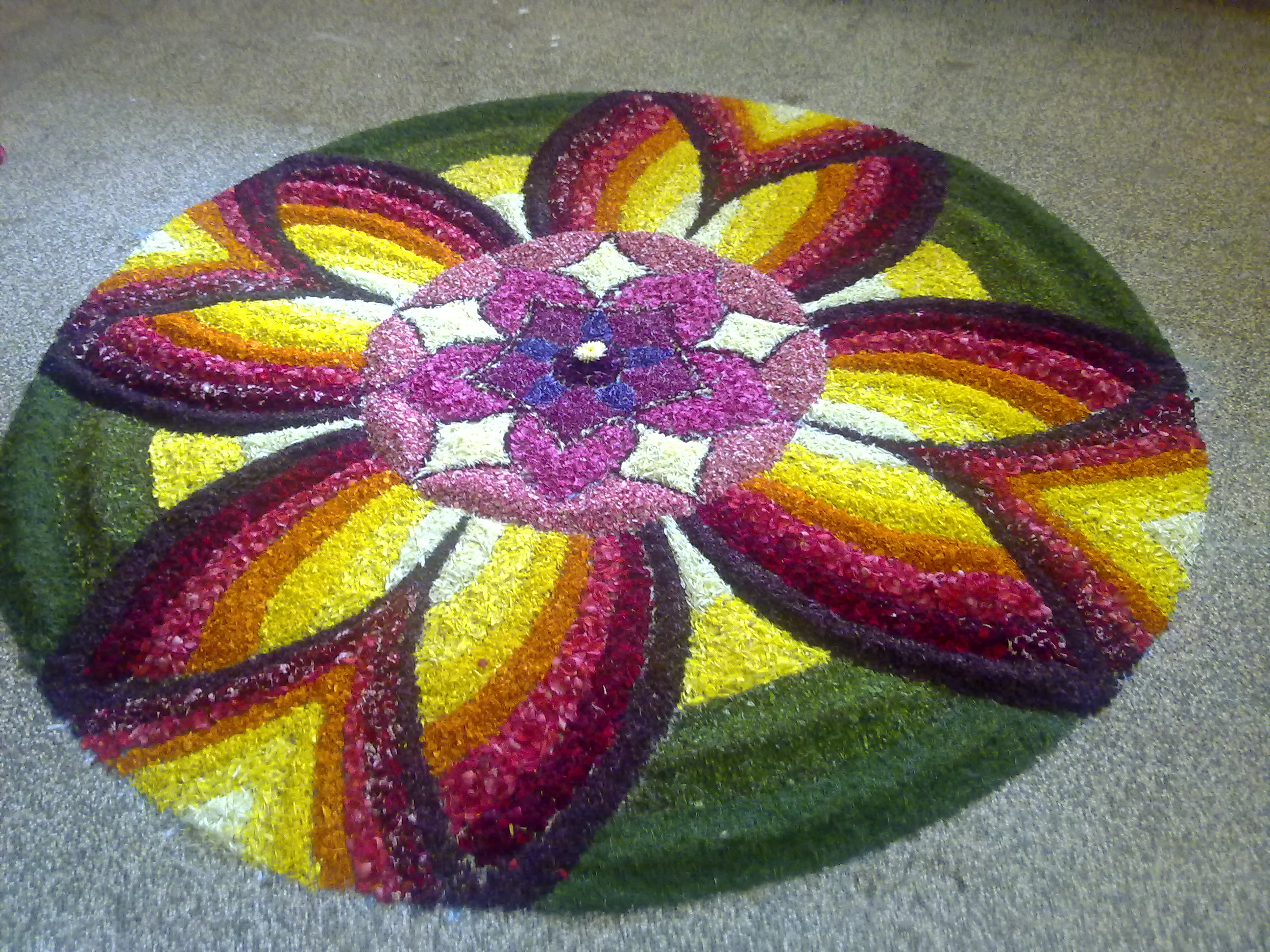
A flower carpet made during the Onam festival in Kerala, India

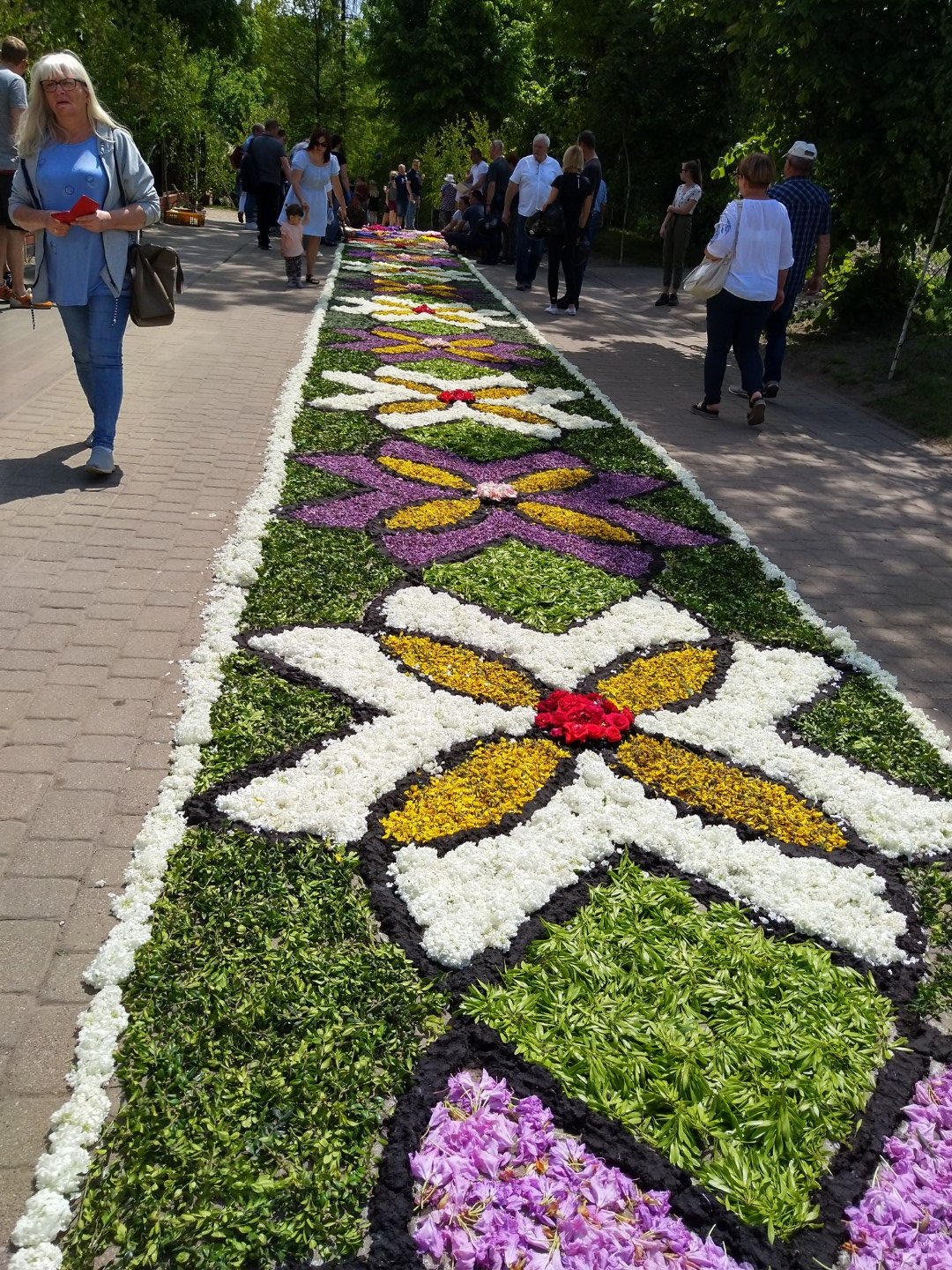
Flower carpet in Spycimierz, Poland

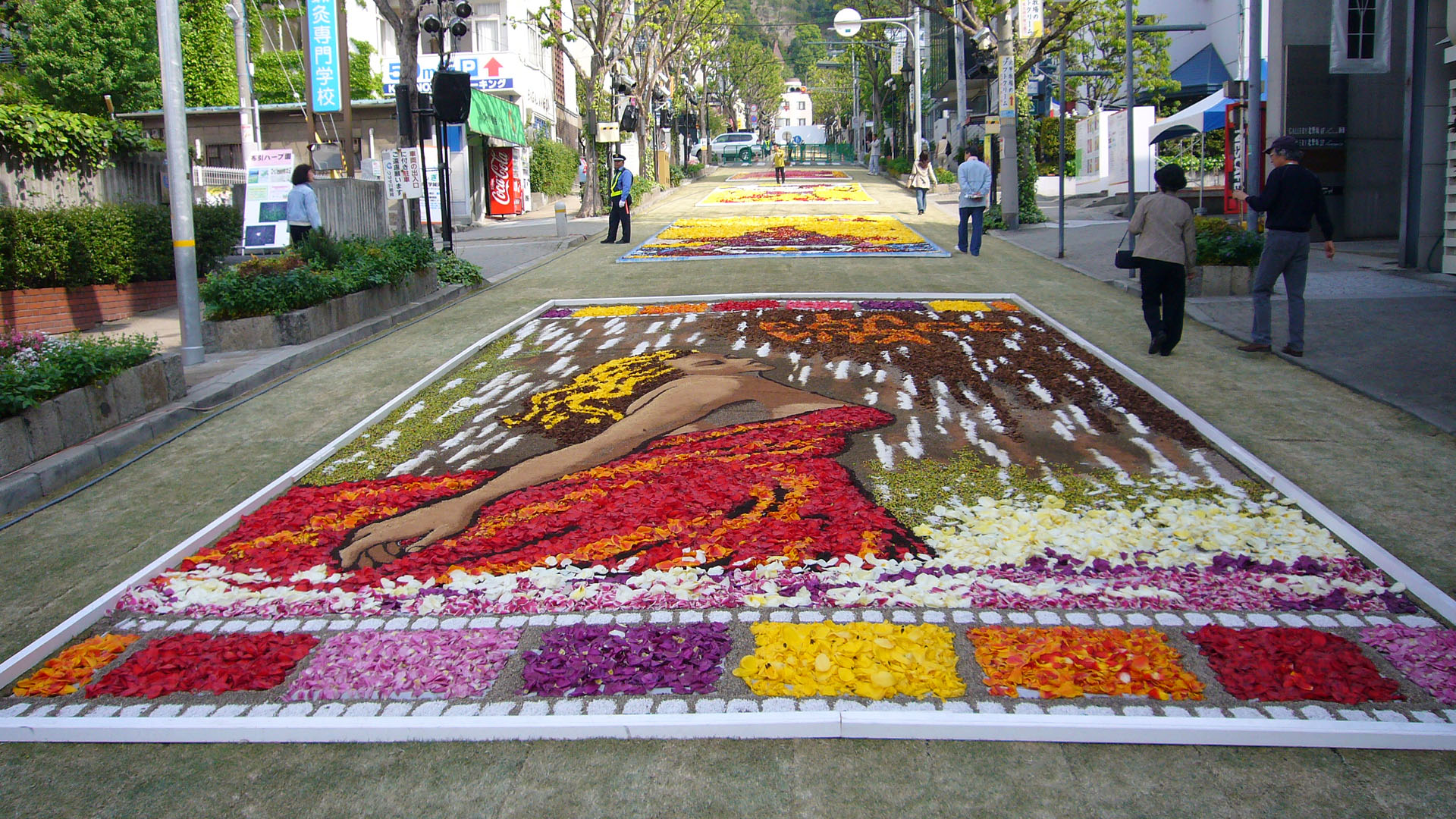
Flower carpets in Kobe, Japan

== See also ==
- Sandpainting
- Sand mandala
- Sawdust carpet
