= Dutch colonial empire =

Dutch colonial empire Nederlandse Koloniale Rijk
- 1595–1962
- Left: Prince's Flag of the Dutch Republic (before 1652); Right: Flag of the Netherlands (after 1806/1813)
- Motto: Je maintiendrai (French) "I will uphold"
- Anthems: Wien Neêrlands Bloed "Those in whom Dutch blood" (1815–1932); Wilhelmus van Nassouwe "William of Nassau" (from 1932)
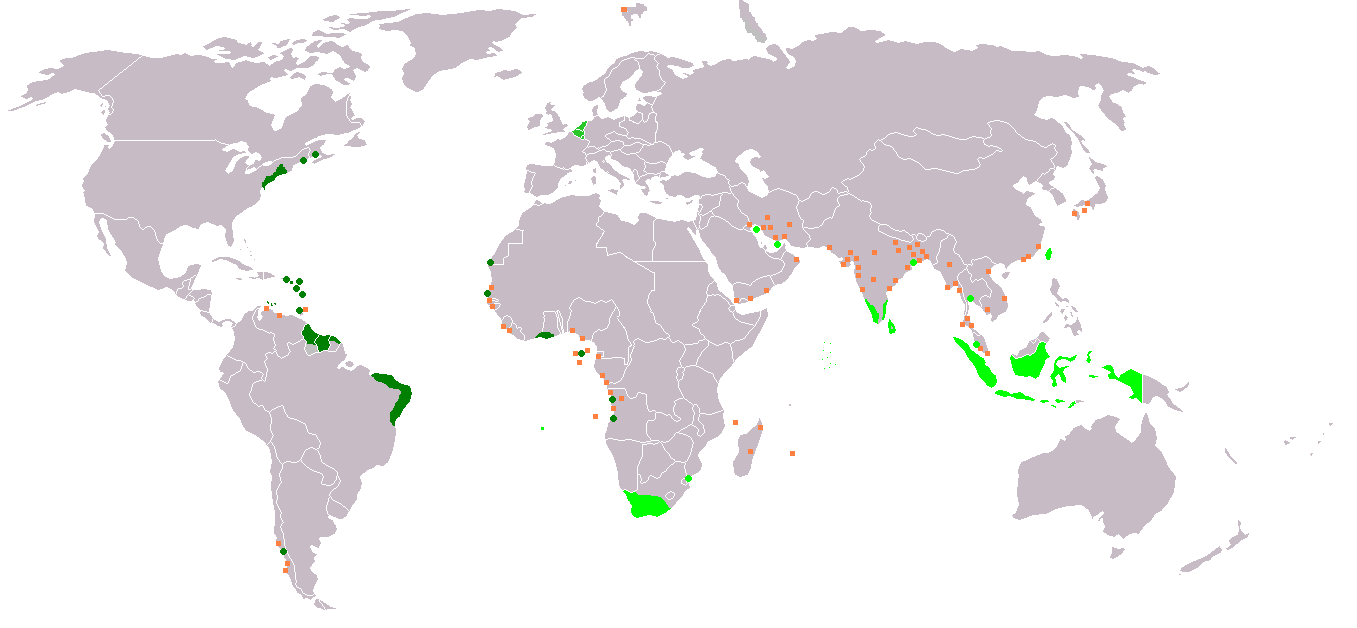
- Map marking territories that at some point were Dutch holdings Territories administered by or originating from territories administered by the Dutch East India Company Territories administered by or originating from territories administered by the Dutch West India Company Tiny orange squares indicate smaller trading posts, the so-called handelsposten.
- History
  - First and second expedition to the East Indies: 1595–1600
  - Company rule in the East Indies started: 1595
  - Colonization of the Americas: 1621
  - Dutch–Portuguese War: 1598–1663
  - Anglo-Dutch Treaty of 1814: 1814
  - Belgian independence: 1830
  - Luxembourgish independence: 1890
  - Axis occupation of the Netherlands and Dutch East Indies: 1940–1945
  - Independence of Indonesia: 1945
  - Kingdom charter: 1954
  - Dutch New Guinea transferred to UN administration: 1962

The Dutch colonial empire (Dutch: Nederlandse Koloniale Rijk) comprised overseas territories and trading posts under some form of Dutch control from the early 17th to late 20th centuries, including those initially administered by Dutch chartered companies—primarily the Dutch East India Company (1602–1799) and Dutch West India Company (1621–1792)—and subsequently governed by the Dutch Republic (1581–1795) and modern Kingdom of the Netherlands (1815–1975).

Following the de facto independence of the Dutch Republic from the Spanish Empire in the late 16th century, various trading companies known as voorcompagnie led maritime expeditions overseas in search of commercial opportunities. By 1600, Dutch traders and mariners had penetrated the lucrative Asian spice trade but lacked the capital or manpower to secure or expand their ventures; this prompted the States General in 1602 to consolidate several trading enterprises into the semi-state-owned Dutch East India Company (Dutch: Verenigde Oost-Indische Compagnie, VOC), which was granted a monopoly over Asian trade.

In contrast to Spanish and Portuguese rivals, Dutch activities abroad were initially commercial ventures driven by merchant enterprise and characterised by control of international maritime shipping routes through strategically placed outposts, rather than by expansive territorial ventures. By the mid-17th century, the VOC—along with the Dutch West India Company (Dutch: Geoctrooieerde Westindische Compagnie, GWC), which was founded in 1621 to advance interests in the Americas—had greatly expanded Dutch economic and territorial influence worldwide, exercising quasi-governmental powers to negotiate treaties, wage war, administer territory, and establish settlements.

At its height in 1652, the Dutch empire spanned colonies or outposts in eastern North America, the Caribbean, South America (Suriname and Brazil), western and southern Africa, mainland India, Sri Lanka, Indonesia, Japan, and Taiwan. While searching for new trade passages between Asia and Europe, Dutch navigators explored and charted distant regions such as Australia, New Zealand, and Tasmania, and parts of eastern North America. The Dutch also secured favorable trading relations with several Asian states, such as the Mughal Empire in India, from which they received half of all textiles and 80% of silks, and exclusive access to the Japanese market.

With the VOC and GWC controlling vital sea lanes and maintaining the largest merchant fleets in the world, the Dutch dominated global trade and commerce for much of the 17th century, experiencing a golden age of economic, scientific, and cultural achievement and progress. The wealth generated from overseas colonies and trading ventures, including the slave trade, fueled patronage of the arts, building projects, and domestic enterprises; port cities such as Rotterdam and Amsterdam experienced unprecedented growth and expansion.

A series of wars with England between 1652 and 1784 challenged Dutch naval supremacy and resulted in the loss of multiple settlements and colonies; the rise of the British East India Company, which conquered the vital trading hub of Mughal Bengal in 1757, likewise weakened Dutch influence and access to foreign markets. By the end of the fourth and final Anglo-Dutch War (1780–1784), the majority of Dutch colonial possessions and trade monopolies were ceded or subsumed by the British Empire and the French colonial empire; the Dutch East Indies and Dutch Guiana remained the only major imperial holdings, surviving until the advent of global decolonisation following World War II.

With the independence of Dutch Guiana as Suriname in 1975, the last vestiges of the Dutch empire—the three West Indies islands of Aruba, Curaçao, and Sint Maarten around the Caribbean Sea—remain as autonomous constituent countries represented within the Kingdom of the Netherlands.

== Former Dutch colonial possessions ==
This list does not include several former trading posts stationed by Dutch, such as Dejima in Japan.

- Dutch East Indies under company rule (1602–1949) and Dutch New Guinea (until 1962)
- Dutch Malacca (1641–1795, 1818–1825)
- Dutch India (1605–1825)
- Dutch Gold Coast (1612–1872)
- Colony of Curaçao and Dependencies (1634–1954), followed by the Dutch Antilles (1954–2010)
- New Netherland (1614–1667, 1673–1674)
- Dutch Guianas (1616–1975)
- Dutch Formosa (1624–1662), and Keelung (Fort Noord-Holland; 1663–1668)
- Dutch Virgin Islands (1625–1680)
- Dutch Bengal (1627–1825)
- Dutch Brazil (1630–1654)
- Dutch Mauritius (1638–1710)
- Dutch Ceylon (1640–1796)
- Dutch Cape Colony (1652–1806)
- Dutch Malabar (1665–1795)
- Dutch Surinam (1667–1954)
- New Holland (Acadia) (1674–1678)

== History ==
=== Origins (1590s–1602) ===
In the 1560s, the Eighty Years' War broke out in the Habsburg Netherlands. (Note: Controversy exists as to precise the origins of the Eighty Years' War.) A coalition of rebel provinces united in the Union of Utrecht declared independence from the Spanish Empire with the 1581 Act of Abjuration, in 1588 establishing the de facto independent northern Dutch Republic (alias the United Provinces), whose sovereignty was recognised by the Treaty of Antwerp (1609). The eight decades of war came at a massive human cost, with an estimated 600,000 to 700,000 victims, of which 350,000 to 400,000 were civilians killed by disease and what would later be considered war crimes. The war was largely fought on the European continent, but war was also conducted against Phillip II's overseas territories, including Spanish colonies and the Portuguese metropoles, colonies, trading posts and forts belonging to the King of Spain and Portugal. The port of Lisbon in Portugal had since 1517 been the main European market for products from India, drawing merchants from across Europe to purchase exotic commodities. As a result of Portugal's incorporation in the Iberian Union with Spain by Philip II in 1580, all Portuguese territories became Spanish Habsburg branch territory, and all Portuguese markets were closed to the United Provinces. In 1595, the Dutch set sail to acquire products for themselves, making use of the "secret" knowledge of the Portuguese trade routes, which Cornelis de Houtman had managed to acquire in Lisbon.

The coastal provinces of Holland and Zeeland had been important hubs of the European maritime trade network for centuries prior to Spanish rule. Their geographical location provided convenient access to the markets of France, Scotland, Germany, England and the Baltic. By the 1580s, the Eighty Years' War led many financiers and traders to emigrate from Antwerp, a major city in Brabant and then one of Europe's most important commercial centres, to Dutch cities, particularly Amsterdam. Efficient access to capital enabled the Dutch in the 1580s to extend their trade routes beyond northern Europe to new markets in the Mediterranean and the Levant. In the 1590s, Dutch ships began to trade with Brazil and the Dutch Gold Coast of Africa, towards the Indian Ocean, and the source of the lucrative spice trade. This brought the Dutch into direct competition with Portugal, which had dominated these trade routes for several decades, and had established colonial outposts on the coasts of Brazil, Africa and the Indian Ocean to facilitate them. The rivalry with Portugal, however, was not entirely economic: from 1580, after the death of the King of Portugal, Sebastian I, and much of the Portuguese nobility in the Battle of Alcácer Quibir, the Portuguese crown had been joined to that of Spain in an "Iberian Union" under the heir of Emperor Charles V, Philip II of Spain. By attacking Portuguese overseas possessions, the Dutch forced Spain to divert financial and military resources away from its attempt to quell Dutch independence. Thus began the several decade-long Dutch–Portuguese War.

In the 1590s, the voorcompagnieën ("pioneer companies") emerged, which were given "express instructions to focus on trade and engage in violence only in self-defense". The Dutch took inspiration from England's many joint-stock companies and private investment, including Muscovy Company, Eastland Company, Levant Company, and East India Company.

The Dutch North Sea fishing fleet needed a great deal of salt to preserve its catch. When the war made Iberian salt inaccessible, from about 1599 the Dutch began illegally loading salt at Araya Peninsula. The salt here was said to be unusually good and inexhaustible. The Dutch also engaged in smuggling and petty piracy, threatened the pearl fishery on Margarita Island and were too numerous for the local Spanish to deal with.

In 1594, the Compagnie van Verre ("Company of Far Lands") was founded in Amsterdam, with the aim of sending two fleets to the spice islands of Maluku. The first fleet sailed in 1596 and returned in 1597 with a cargo of pepper, which more than covered the costs of the voyage. The second voyage (1598–1599), returned its investors a 400% profit. The success of these voyages led to the founding of a number of companies competing for the trade. The competition was counterproductive to the companies' interests as it threatened to drive up the price of spices at their source in Indonesia whilst driving them down in Europe.

In 1605 a fleet was sent from Spain to the Caribbean sea. They captured a dozen or more Dutch ships and sent their crews to the galleys. Next year the Dutch returned. During the twelve years' truce the Dutch shifted back to Iberia, but when it expired in 1621 they came back. The Spanish established the Araya Fortress and garrison. In the next two years there were battles and the Dutch were driven out. The Dutch then shifted to places like Curazao, Bonaire, Saint Martin (island) and La Tortuga Island.

=== Establishment of the Dutch East India Company (VOC) (1602–1609) ===
"The present deputies of the East India Company are seriously admonished to look into and give orders to the effect that the ships, which are already equipped or afterwards shall be equipped to sail to the East Indies, can have charge and instruction to damage the enemies and inflict harm on their persons, ships and goods by all means possible, so that they may with reputation not only continue their trade, but also expand it and make it grow, otherwise by neglecting this they will certainly lose it. For this was the principal reason why the Gentlemen States General have undertaken the union of the Companies and awarded them a charter and authorisation to inflict damage on the enemies."

— States-General resolution 1 November 1603

As a result of the problems caused by inter-company rivalry, the Dutch East India Company (Dutch: Verenigde Oost-Indische Compagnie, VOC) was founded in 1602. The charter awarded to the company by the States-General granted it sole rights, for an initial period of 21 years, to Dutch trade and navigation east of the Cape of Good Hope and west of the Straits of Magellan. The directors of the company, the "Heeren XVII", were given the legal authority to establish "fortresses and strongholds", to sign treaties, to enlist both an army and a navy, and to wage defensive war. The company itself was founded as a joint stock company, similarly to its English rival that had been founded two years earlier, the English East India Company.

Shortly after the VOC was founded, the problem of justifying attacks on Spanish and Portuguese ships became more acute when in February 1603, the Portuguese carrack Santa Catarina was captured off the coast of Singapore by three VOC ships under the command of Jacob van Heemskerck. When Heemskerck returned to Amsterdam in 1604 with the enormous booty from the Santa Catarina, this caused a major controversy in the Dutch Republic about the legality, utility, and moral permissibility of this act. As a result, in September 1604 jurist Hugo Grotius wrote a treatise titled De Jure Praedae Commentarius ("Commentary on the Law of Prize and Booty"), later published in 1609 as Mare Liberum, sive de jure quod Batavis competit ad Indicana commercia dissertatio ("The Freedom of the Seas, Or, The Right Which Belongs to the Dutch to Take Part in the East Indian Trade"), in which the act of aggression was justified.

In the meantime, the States-General had already passed a resolution on 1 November 1603, authorising VOC ships "to damage the enemies and inflict harm on their persons, ships and goods by all means possible, so that they may with reputation not only continue their trade, but also expand it and make it grow". This was a "critical" event according to several historical studies, with Borschberg (2013) stating it "marked a major shift in policy of the VOC" and "set the cornerstone for the establishment of the Dutch colonial empire in Asia", because the resolution transformed the VOC "into an instrument of war and colonial expansion that was directed against the Iberian powers in Asia and later, of course, also against local Asian rulers and polities." Pursuing their quest for alternative routes to Asia for trade, the Dutch were disrupting the Spanish-Portuguese trade, and they eventually ranged as far afield as the Philippines. The Dutch sought to dominate the commercial sea trade in Southeast Asia, going so far in pursuit of this goal as to engage in what other nations and powers considered to be little more than piratical activities.

During the negotiations for and implementation of the Twelve Years' Truce in the years 1608–1610, the Dutch sought to secure all sorts of commercially and strategically important positions in Southeast Asia, and the VOC rushed to conclude as many contracts as possible with local monarchs and polities in the so-called frontline regions: the Malay Peninsula (particularly Johor), Sumatra, the Banda Islands, the Moluccas, Timor and southern India.

=== Dutch conquest of the Banda Islands (1609–1621) ===
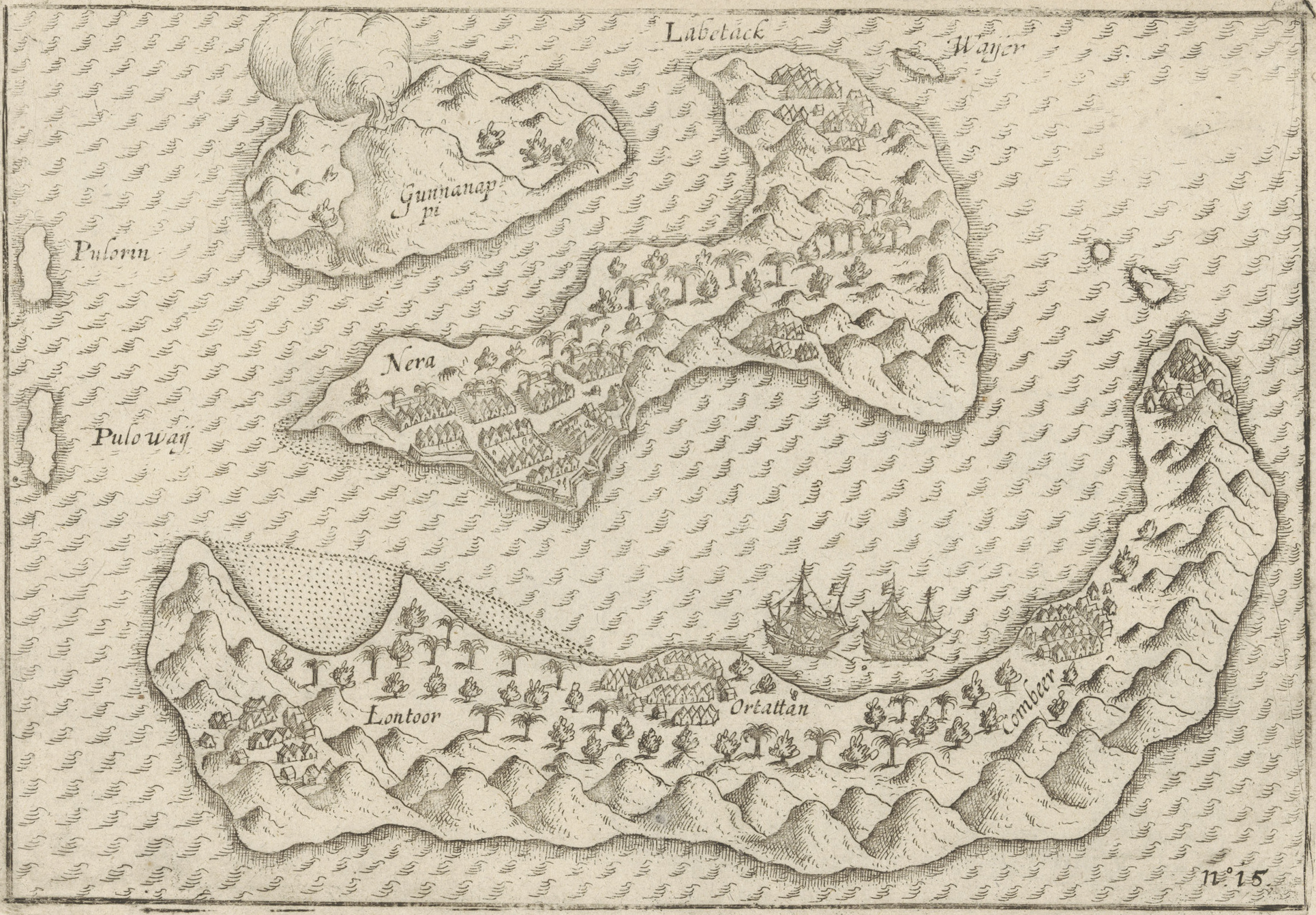
Dutch map of the Banda Islands, dated c. 1599–1619

The Dutch conquest of the Banda Islands, also referred to as the Banda genocide, was a process of military conquest from 1609 to 1621 by the Dutch East India Company of the Banda Islands. The Dutch, having enforced a monopoly on the highly lucrative nutmeg production from the islands, were impatient with Bandanese resistance to Dutch demands that the Bandanese sell only to them. Negotiations collapsed after Bandanese village elders deceived and murdered the Dutch representative Pieter Willemsz Verhoeff. Under the command of Jan Pieterszoon Coen, the Dutch resorted to a forcible conquest of the islands, which became severely depopulated as a result of Coen's massacres, forced deportations, and the resulting starvation and disease.

The Dutch East India Company, which was founded in 1602 as an amalgamation of 12 voorcompagnies, had extensive financial interests in maritime Southeast Asia, the source of highly profitable spices, which were in high demand in Europe. A Dutch expedition had already made contact with the islands in 1599, signing several contracts with Bandanese chiefs. The profitability of the spices was heightened by the fact that they grew nowhere else on Earth, making them extremely valuable to whoever controlled them. As the Dutch attempted to form a monopoly over the spices and forbid the Bandanese from selling to any other group, they resisted, and the Dutch decided to conquer the islands by force. With the aid of Japanese mercenaries, the Dutch launched several military expeditions against the Bandanese.

The conquest culminated in the Banda massacre, which saw 2,800 Bandanese killed and 1,700 enslaved by the Dutch. Along with starvation and constant fighting, the Bandanese felt they could not continue to resist the Dutch and negotiated a surrender in 1621. Jan Pieterszoon Coen, the official in charge of the fighting, expelled the remaining 1,000 Bandanese to Batavia. With the Bandanese resistance ended, the Dutch secured their valuable monopoly on the spice trade.

=== Iberian–Dutch conflicts (until 1661) ===
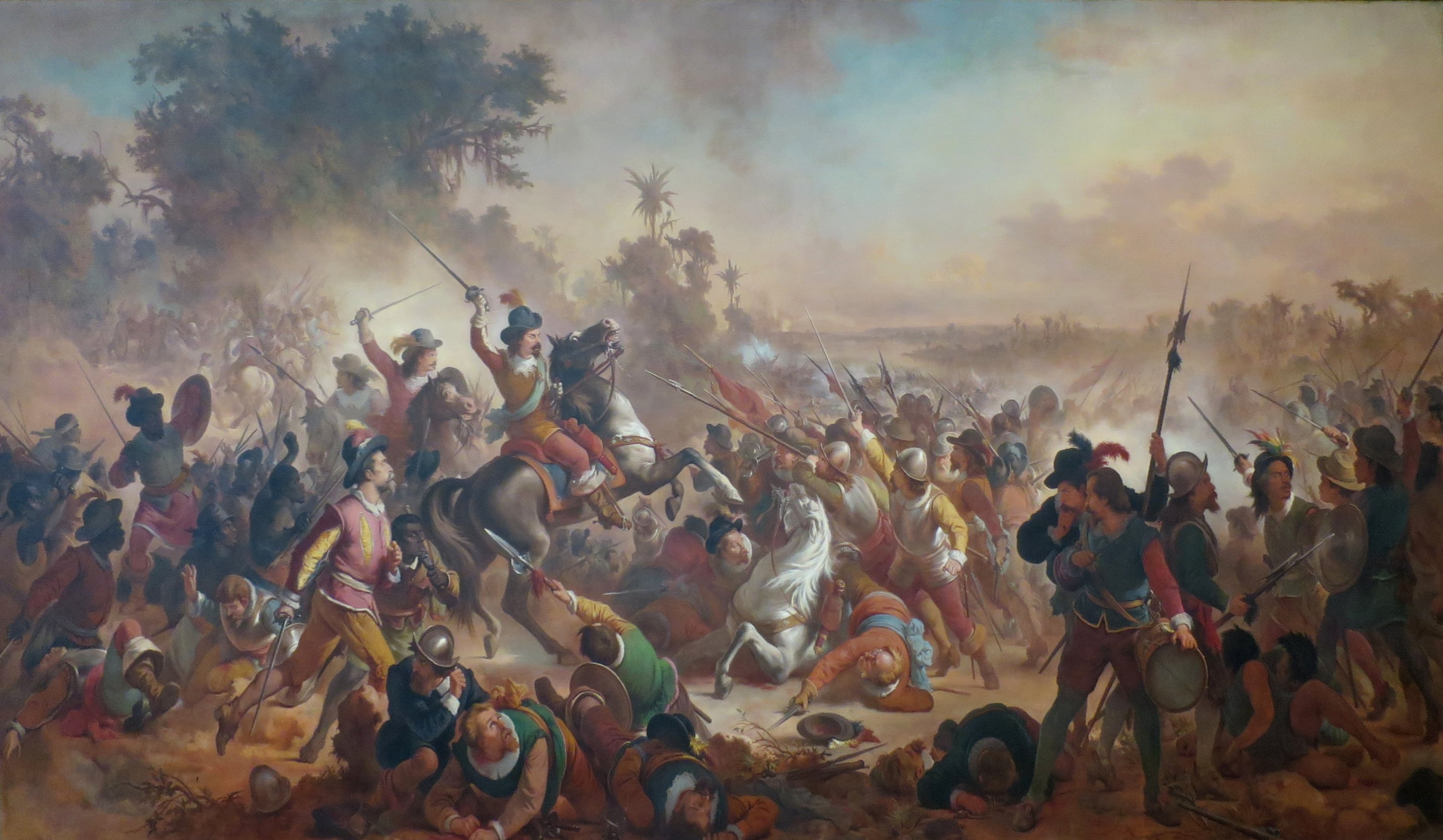
The Portuguese victory at the Battle of Guararapes ended Dutch presence in Brazil.

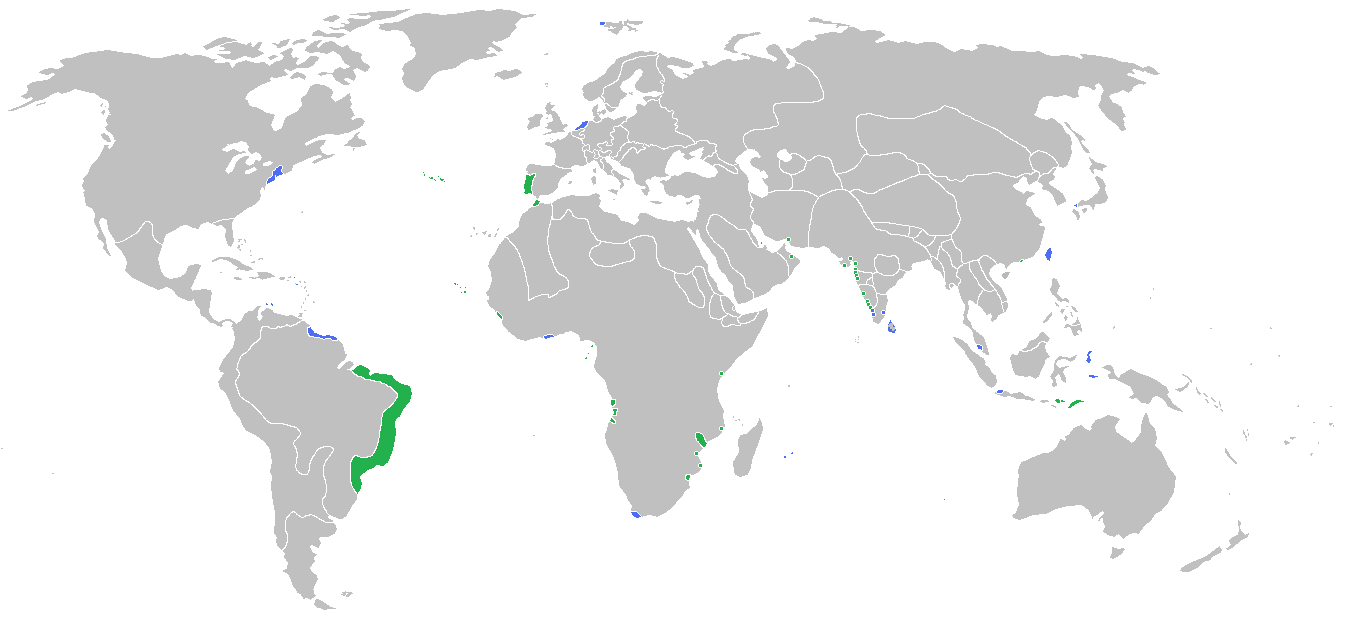
Dutch and Portuguese colonial empires at their Treaty of the Hague war settlement in 1661

The Dutch attacked most of Portugal's far-flung trading network in and around Asia, including Ceylon (modern Sri Lanka), and Goa, as well as attacks upon her commercial interests in Japan, Africa (especially Mina), and South America. Even though the Portuguese had never been able to capture the entire island of Ceylon, they had been able to keep the coastal regions under their control for a considerable time before the coming of the Dutch in war. Portugal's South American colony, Brazil, was partially conquered by the United Provinces.

In 1621, the Dutch West India Company (WIC) was set up and given a 25-year monopoly to those parts of the world not controlled by its East India counterpart: the Atlantic, the Americas and the west coast of Africa. The Dutch also established a trading post in Ayutthaya, modern day Thailand during the reign of King Naresuan, in 1604.

In the 17th century, the "Grand Design" of the West India Company involved attempting to corner the international trade in sugar by attacking Portuguese colonies in Brazil and Africa, seizing both the sugarcane plantations and the slave ports needed to resupply their labour. Although weakened by the Iberian Union with Spain, whose attention was focused elsewhere, the Portuguese were able to fight off the initial assault before the Battle of Matanzas Bay provided the WIC with the funds needed for a successful operation. Johan Maurits was appointed governor of "New Holland" and landed at Recife in January 1637. In a series of successful expeditions, he gradually extended the Dutch possessions from Sergipe on the south to Maranhão in the north. The WIC also succeeded in conquering Gorée, Elmina Castle, Saint Thomas, and Luanda on the west coast of Africa. Both regions were also used as bases for Dutch privateers plundering Portuguese and Spanish trade routes. The dissolution of the Iberian Union in 1640 and Maurits's recall in 1643 led to increased resistance from the Portuguese colonists who still made up a majority of the Brazilian settlers. The Dutch were finally overcome during the 1650s but managed to receive 4 million reis (63 metric tons of gold) in exchange for extinguishing their claims over Brazil in the 1661 Treaty of the Hague.

=== Dutch colonisation of Asia ===
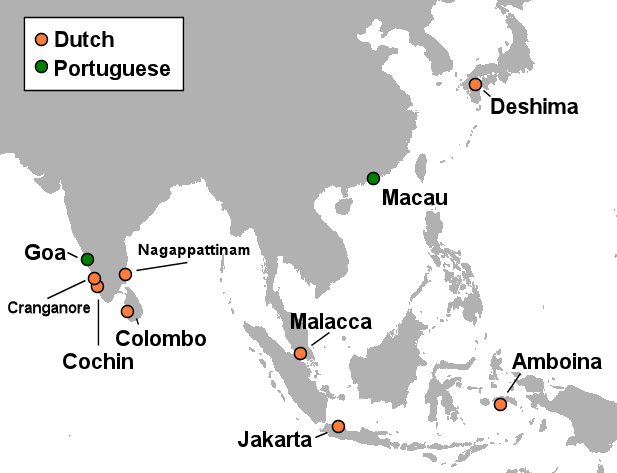
Primary Dutch and Portuguese settlements in Asia, c. 1665. With the exception of Jakarta and Deshima, all had been captured by the Dutch East India Company from Portugal.

The war between Phillip II's possessions and other countries led to a deterioration of the Portuguese Empire, as with the loss of Ormuz to England in 1622, but the Dutch Empire was the main beneficiary.

The VOC began immediately to prise away the string of coastal fortresses that, at the time, comprised the Portuguese Empire. The settlements were isolated, difficult to reinforce if attacked, and prone to being picked off one by one, but nevertheless, the Dutch only enjoyed mixed success in its attempts to do so. Amboina was captured from the Portuguese in 1605, but an attack on Malacca the following year narrowly failed in its objective to provide a more strategically located base in the East Indies with favourable monsoon winds. The Dutch found what they were looking for in Jakarta, conquered by Jan Pieterszoon Coen in 1619, later renamed Batavia after the putative Dutch ancestors the Batavians, and which would become the capital of the Dutch East Indies. Meanwhile, the Dutch continued to drive out the Portuguese from their bases in Asia. Malacca finally succumbed in 1641 (after a second attempt to capture it), Colombo in 1656, Ceylon in 1658, Nagapattinam in 1662, and Cranganore and Cochin in 1662.

Goa, the capital of the Portuguese Empire in the East, was unsuccessfully attacked by the Dutch in 1603 and 1610. Whilst the Dutch were unable in four attempts to capture Macau, from where Portugal monopolized the lucrative China-Japan trade, the Tokugawa shogunate's increasing suspicion of the intentions of the Catholic Portuguese led to their expulsion in 1639. Under the subsequent sakoku policy, from 1639 till 1854 (215 years), the Dutch were the only European power allowed to operate in Japan, confined in 1639 to Hirado and then from 1641 at Dejima. In the mid-17th century, the Dutch also explored the western Australian coasts, naming many places.

The Dutch tried to use military force to make Ming China open up to Dutch trade but the Chinese defeated the Dutch in a war over the Penghu islands from 1623 to 1624, forcing the VOC to abandon Penghu for Taiwan. Then Chinese defeated the Dutch again at the Battle of Liaoluo Bay in 1633.

The Dutch colonised Mauritius in 1638, several decades after three ships out of the Dutch Second Fleet sent to the Spice Islands were blown off course in a storm and landed there in 1598. They named it in honour of Prince Maurice of Nassau, the Stadtholder of the Netherlands. The Dutch found the climate hostile and abandoned the island after several further decades. The Dutch established a colony at Tayouan (present-day Anping), in the south of Taiwan, an island then largely dominated by Portuguese traders and known as Formosa; and, in 1642 the Dutch took northern Formosa from the Spanish by force.

=== Dutch colonisation of the Americas ===
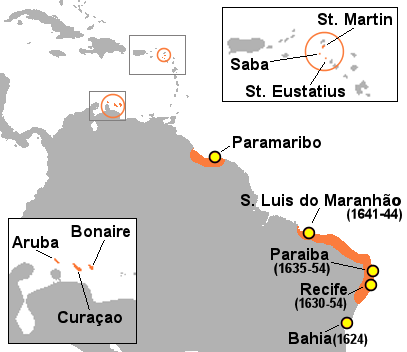
Dutch conquests in the West Indies and Brazil (Note: Reproduced from Boxer (1965), p.101.)

The Dutch colonisation of the Americas started with many mixed results. In the Atlantic, the West India Company concentrated on wresting from Portugal its grip on the sugar and slave trade, and on opportunistic attacks on the Spanish treasure fleets on their homeward bound voyage. In 1605 a Spanish fleet was sent from Cadiz to the Caribbean sea to control piracy. They captured a dozen or more Dutch ships and sent their crews to the galleys. Next year the Dutch were back. During the twelve years' truce the Dutch shifted back to Iberia. On April 9, 1621, the truce expired resuming the Eighty Years' War. On 3 June 1621, the WIC was granted a charter for a trade monopoly in the Dutch West Indies on jurisdiction over Dutch participation in the Atlantic slave trade, Brazil, the Caribbean, and North America. When the Dutch came back to the Caribbean the Spanish established the Araya Fortress and garrison. In the next two years there were battles and the Dutch were driven out. The Dutch then shifted to places like Bonaire, Saint Martin (island) and La Tortuga Island. Bahia on the north east coast of Brazil was captured in 1624 but only held for a year before it was recaptured by a joint Spanish-Portuguese expedition., In 1630, the Dutch occupied the Portuguese sugar-settlement of Pernambuco and over the next few years pushed, annexing the sugar plantations that surrounded it. In order to supply the plantations with the manpower they required, a successful expedition was launched from Brazil to capture the Portuguese slaving post of Elmina in 1637, and successfully captured the Portuguese settlements in Angola in 1641. In 1642, the Dutch captured the Portuguese possession of Axim in Africa. By 1650, the West India Company was firmly in control of both the sugar and slave trades, and had occupied the Caribbean islands of Sint Maarten, Curaçao, Aruba, and Bonaire in order to guarantee access to the islands' salt-pans.

Unlike in Asia, Dutch successes against the Portuguese in Brazil and Africa were short-lived. Years of settlement had left large Portuguese communities under the rule of the Dutch, who were by nature traders rather than colonisers. In 1645, the Portuguese community at Pernambuco rebelled against their Dutch masters, and by 1654, the Dutch had been ousted from Brazil. In the intervening years, a Portuguese expedition had been sent from Brazil to recapture Luanda in Angola, expelling the Dutch by 1648.

On the north-east coast of North America, the West India Company took over a settlement that had been established by the Company of New Netherland (1614–1618) at Fort Orange at Albany on the Hudson River, relocated from Fort Nassau which had been founded in 1614. The Dutch had been sending ships annually to the Hudson River to trade fur since Henry Hudson's voyage of 1609. To protect its precarious position at Albany from the nearby English and French, the Company founded the fortified town of New Amsterdam in 1625, at the mouth of the Hudson, encouraging settlement of the surrounding areas of Long Island and New Jersey. The fur trade ultimately proved impossible for the company to monopolize due to the massive illegal private trade in furs, and the settlement of New Netherland was unprofitable. In 1655, the nearby colony of New Sweden on the Delaware River was forcibly absorbed into New Netherland after ships and soldiers were sent to capture it by the Dutch governor, Pieter Stuyvesant.

Since its inception, the Dutch East India Company had been in competition with its counterpart, the English East India Company, founded two years earlier, for the same goods and markets in the East. In 1619, the rivalry resulted in the Amboyna massacre, when several English Company men were executed by agents of the Dutch. The event remained a source of English resentment for several decades, and indeed was used as a cause célèbre as late as the Second Anglo-Dutch War in the 1660s; nevertheless, in the late 1620s the English Company shifted its focus from Indonesia to India.

In 1643, the Dutch West India Company established a settlement in the ruins of the Spanish settlement of Valdivia, in southern Chile. The purpose of the expedition was to gain a foothold on the west coast of the Americas, an area that was almost entirely under the control of Spain (the Pacific Ocean, at least most of it to the east of the Philippines, being at the time almost a "Spanish lake"), and to extract gold from nearby mines. Uncooperative indigenous peoples, who had forced the Spanish to leave Valdivia in 1604 contributed to get the expedition to leave after some months of occupation. This occupation triggered the return of the Spanish to Valdivia and the building of one of the largest defensive complexes of colonial America.

=== Dutch colonisation of Southern Africa ===
By the middle of the 17th century, the Dutch East India Company had overtaken Portugal as the dominant player in the spice and silk trade, and in 1652 founded a colony at the Cape of Good Hope on the southern African coast, as a victualing station for its ships on the route between Europe and Asia. Dutch immigration in the Cape rapidly swelled as prospective colonists were offered generous grants of land and tax exempt status in exchange for producing the food needed to resupply passing ships. The Cape authorities also imported a number of Europeans of other nationalities, namely Germans and French Huguenots, as well as thousands of slaves from the East Indies, to bolster the local Dutch workforce. Nevertheless, there was a degree of cultural assimilation between the various ethnic groups due to intermarriage and the universal adoption of the Dutch language, and cleavages were likelier to occur along social and racial lines.

The Dutch colony at the Cape of Good Hope expanded beyond the initial settlement and its borders were formally consolidated as the composite Dutch Cape Colony in 1778. At the time, the Dutch had subdued the indigenous Khoisan and San peoples in the Cape and seized their traditional territories. Dutch military expeditions further east were halted when they encountered the westward expansion of the Xhosa people. Hoping to avoid being drawn into a protracted dispute, the Dutch government and the Xhosa chieftains agreed to formally demarcate their respective areas of control and refrain from trespassing on each other's borders. However, the Dutch proved unable to control their own settlers, who disregarded the agreement and crossed into Xhosa territory, sparking one of Southern Africa's longest colonial conflicts: the Xhosa Wars.

=== Rivalry with Great Britain and France (1652–1795) ===
In 1651, the English parliament passed the first of the Navigation Acts which excluded Dutch shipping from the lucrative trade between England and its Caribbean colonies, and led directly to the outbreak of hostilities between the two countries the following year, the first of three Anglo-Dutch Wars that would last on and off for two decades and slowly erode Dutch naval power to England's benefit.

In 1661, amidst the Qing conquest of China, Ming general Koxinga led a fleet to invade Formosa. The Dutch defense, led by governor Frederick Coyett, held out for nine months. However, after Koxinga defeated Dutch reinforcements from Java, Coyett surrendered Formosa.

The Anglo-Dutch Wars were a series of three wars which took place between the English and the Dutch from 1652 to 1674. The causes included political disputes and increasing competition from merchant shipping. The English in the First Anglo-Dutch War (1652–54) had the naval advantage with larger numbers of more powerful "ships of the line" which were well suited to the naval tactics of the era. The English also captured numerous Dutch merchant ships. Holmes's Bonfire was a raid on the Vlie estuary in the Netherlands, executed by the English Fleet during the Second Anglo-Dutch War on 19 and 20 August 1666. The attack, named after the commander of the landing force, Rear-Admiral Robert Holmes, was successful in destroying by fire a large Dutch merchant fleet of 140 ships. During the same action, the town of West-Terschelling was burnt down, which caused outrage in the Dutch Republic.

The Second Anglo-Dutch War was precipitated in 1664, when English forces moved to capture New Netherland. Under the Treaty of Breda (1667), New Netherland was ceded to England in exchange for the English settlements in Suriname, which had been conquered by Dutch forces earlier that year. Though the Dutch would again take New Netherland in 1673, during the Third Anglo-Dutch War, it was returned to England the following year, thereby ending Dutch rule in continental North America, but leaving behind a large Dutch community under English rule that persisted with its language, church and customs until the mid-18th century. In South America, the Dutch seized Cayenne from the French in 1658 and drove off a French attempt to retake it a year later. However, it was returned to France in 1664, since the colony proved to be unprofitable. It was recaptured by the Dutch in 1676, but was returned again a year later, this time permanently. The Glorious Revolution of 1688 saw the Dutch William of Orange ascend to the throne, and win the English, Scottish, and Irish crowns, ending eighty years of rivalry between the Netherlands and England, while the rivalry with France remained strong.

During the American Revolutionary War, Britain declared war on the Netherlands, the Fourth Anglo-Dutch War, in which Britain seized the Dutch colony of Ceylon. Under the Peace of Paris (1783), Ceylon was returned to the Netherlands and Negapatnam ceded to Britain.

=== Napoleonic era (1795–1815) ===
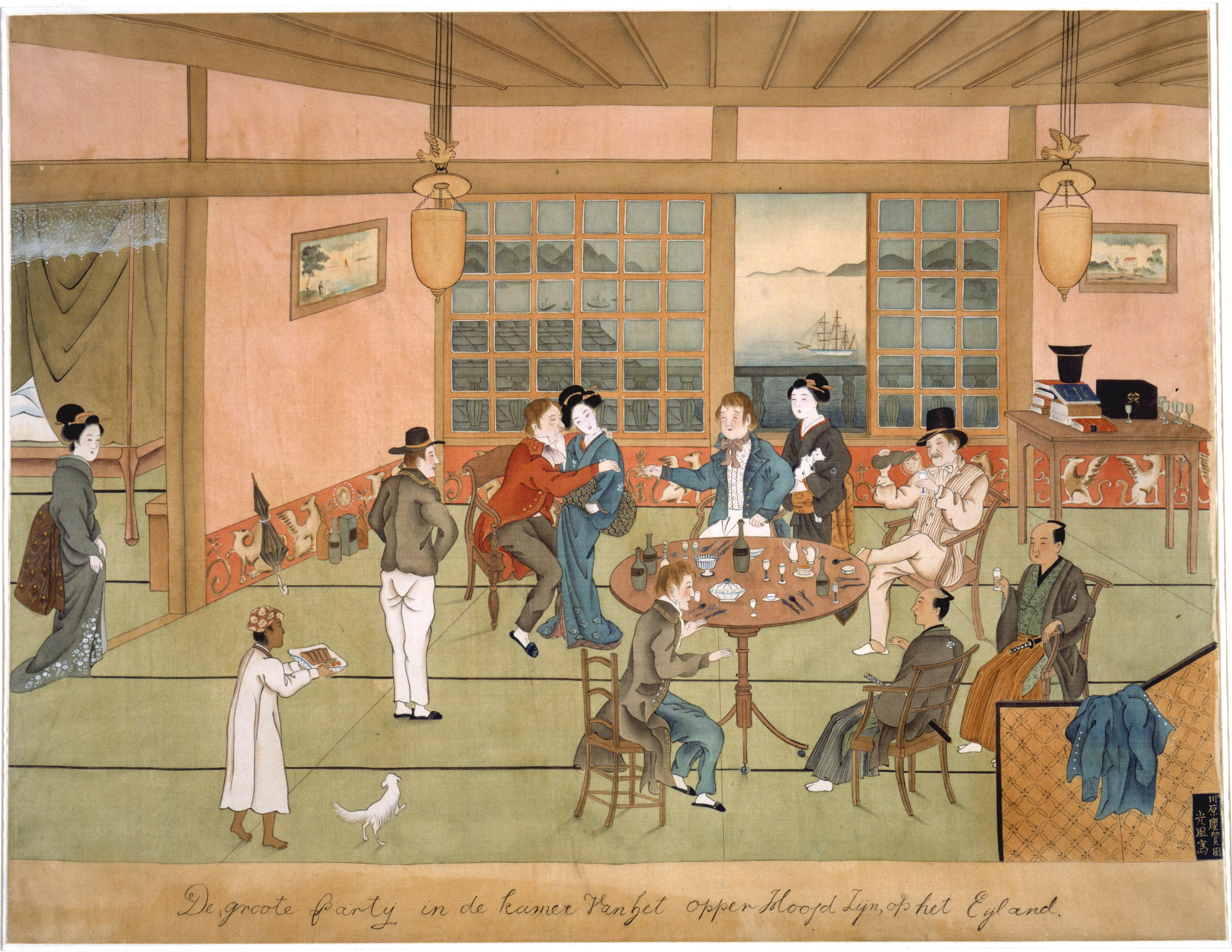
Dejima trading post in Japan, c. 1805

In 1795, the French Revolutionary Army invaded the Dutch Republic and turned the nation into a satellite of France, named the Batavian Republic. Britain, which was at war with France, soon moved to occupy Dutch colonies in Asia, South Africa, and the Caribbean.

Under the terms of the Treaty of Amiens signed by Britain and France in 1802, the Cape Colony and the islands of the Dutch West Indies that the British had seized were returned to the Republic. Ceylon was not returned to the Dutch and was made a British Crown Colony. After the outbreak of hostilities between Britain and France again in 1803, the British retook the Cape Colony and the Dutch West Indies. The British also invaded and captured the island of Java in 1811.

In 1806, Napoleon dissolved the Batavian Republic and established a monarchy with his brother, Louis Bonaparte, on the throne as King of the Netherlands. Louis was removed from power by Napoleon in 1810, and the country was ruled directly from France until its liberation in 1813. The following year, the independent Netherlands signed the Anglo-Dutch Treaty of 1814 with Britain. All the colonies Britain had seized were returned to the Netherlands, with the exception of the Dutch Cape Colony, Dutch Ceylon, and part of Dutch Guyana.

=== Post-Napoleonic era (1815–1945) ===
Expansion of the Dutch East Indies in the Indonesian Archipelago

After Napoleon's defeat in 1815, Europe's borders were redrawn at the Congress of Vienna. For the first time since the declaration of independence from Spain in 1581, the Dutch were reunited with the Southern Netherlands in a constitutional monarchy, the United Kingdom of the Netherlands. The union lasted just 15 years. In 1830, a revolution in the southern half of the country led to the de facto independence of the new state of Belgium.

The bankrupt Dutch East India Company was liquidated on 1 January 1800, and its territorial possessions were nationalized as the Dutch East Indies. Anglo-Dutch rivalry in Southeast Asia continued to fester over the port of Singapore, which had been ceded to the British East India Company in 1819 by the sultan of Johore. The Dutch claimed that a treaty signed with the sultan's predecessor the year earlier had granted them control of the region. However, the impossibility of removing the British from Singapore, which was becoming an increasingly important centre of trade, became apparent to the Dutch, and the disagreement was resolved with the Anglo-Dutch Treaty of 1824. Under its terms, the Netherlands ceded Malacca and their bases in India to the British, and recognized the British claim to Singapore. In return, the British handed over Bencoolen and agreed not to sign treaties with rulers in the "islands south of the Straits of Singapore". Thus the archipelago was divided into two spheres of influence: a British one, on the Malay Peninsula, and a Dutch one in the East Indies.

For most of the Dutch East Indies history, and that of the VOC before it, Dutch control over their territories was often tenuous, but was expanded over the course of the 19th century. Only in the early 20th century did Dutch dominance extend to what was to become the boundaries of modern-day Indonesia. Although highly populated and agriculturally productive Java was under Dutch domination for most of the 350 years of the combined VOC and Dutch East Indies era, many areas remained independent for much of this time including Aceh, Lombok, Bali, and Borneo.

In 1871, all of the Dutch possessions on the Dutch Gold Coast were sold to Britain. The Dutch West India Company was abolished in 1791, and its colonies in Suriname and the Caribbean brought under the direct rule of the state. The economies of the Dutch colonies in the Caribbean had been based on the smuggling of goods and slaves into Spanish America, but with the end of the slave trade in 1814 and the independence of the new nations of South and Central America from Spain, profitability rapidly declined. Dutch traders moved en masse from the islands to the United States or other parts of the Americas, leaving behind small populations with little income and which required subsidies from the Dutch government. The Antilles were combined under one administration with Suriname from 1828 to 1845.

Slavery was not abolished in the Dutch Caribbean colonies until 1863 (this day is called Keti Koti), long after those of Britain and France, though by this time only 6,500 slaves remained. In Suriname, slave holders demanded compensation from the Dutch government for freeing slaves, whilst in Sint Maarten, abolition of slavery in the French half in 1848 led slaves in the Dutch half to take their own freedom. In Suriname, after the abolition of slavery, Chinese workers were encouraged to immigrate as indentured labourers, as were Javanese, between 1890 and 1939.

The Dutch presence in the Caribbean and South America was minimal. The Netherlands West Indies included the possessions of Aruba, Bonaire, Curaçao, Saba, and Sint Eustatius and Sint Maarten. Just to the south lay Surinam. At the Netherlands' entrance into the war in 1940, the West Indies was only defended by local police and militia. The only Dutch naval vessel stationed there was the sloop Van Kinsbergen. Surinam was protected by a single 200-strong company of Army infantry, supplemented by a militia rifle company and an old station ship.

Aruba and Curaçao were home to important oil refineries, therefore the two islands were placed under British protection on 10 May 1940. Surinam was one of the most important bauxite suppliers. Aluminium was vital to the American airplane industry. In September 1941, President Franklin D. Roosevelt offered American troops to help protect the colony. In November 1941, the first 1,000 American troops arrived in Paramaribo. In 1942, protection of Aruba and Curaçao was transferred to the United States.

In 1942 funding was made available in Surinam for coastal artillery and conscription. Conscripted soldiers in Surinam and the West Indies formed national guard units, called Schutterij. Hundreds of conscripts served as anti-aircraft gunners on merchant and navy vessels during the war, of whom dozens were killed. Volunteers joined the Civic Guard (Burgerwacht) in the West Indies and the City and Country Guard (Stad en Landwacht) in Surinam. By then a Dutch motor whaleboat patrolled Aruba while Curaçao was defended by several light craft. The latter were detached for use as convoy escorts in July 1942.

=== Decolonization (1942–1975) ===
==== Indonesia ====
Sukarno, leader of the Indonesian independence movement

In January 1942, Japan invaded the Netherlands East Indies. The Dutch surrendered two months later in Java, with Indonesians initially welcoming the Japanese as liberators. The subsequent Japanese occupation of the Dutch East Indies during the remainder of World War II saw the fundamental dismantling of the Dutch colonial state's economic, political and social structures, replacing it with a Japanese regime. In the decades before the war, the Dutch had been overwhelmingly successful in suppressing the small nationalist movement in Indonesia such that the Japanese occupation proved fundamental for Indonesian independence. However, the Indonesian Communist Party founded by Dutch socialist Henk Sneevliet in 1914, popular also with Dutch workers and sailors at the time, was in strategic alliance with Sarekat Islam (q.v.) as early as 1917 until the Proclamation of Indonesian Independence and was particularly important in the fight against Japanese occupation of the Dutch East Indies in the Second World War. The Japanese encouraged and backed Indonesian nationalism in which new indigenous institutions were created and nationalist leaders such as Sukarno were promoted. The internment of all Dutch citizens meant that Indonesians filled many leadership and administrative positions, although the top positions were still held by the Japanese.

Two days after the Japanese surrender in August 1945, Sukarno and fellow nationalist leader Hatta unilaterally declared Indonesian independence. A four-and-a-half-year struggle followed as the Dutch tried to re-establish their colony. Dutch forces eventually re-occupied most of the colonial territory and a guerrilla struggle ensued. The majority of Indonesians, and – ultimately – international opinion, favored independence, and in December 1949, the Netherlands formally recognized Indonesian sovereignty. Under the terms of the 1949 agreement, Western New Guinea remained under the auspices of the Dutch as Netherlands New Guinea, and its dispute will be resolved by a year. The new Indonesian government under President Sukarno pressured for the territory to come under Indonesian control as Indonesian nationalists initially intended. Following United States pressure, the Netherlands transferred it to Indonesia under the 1962 New York Agreement.

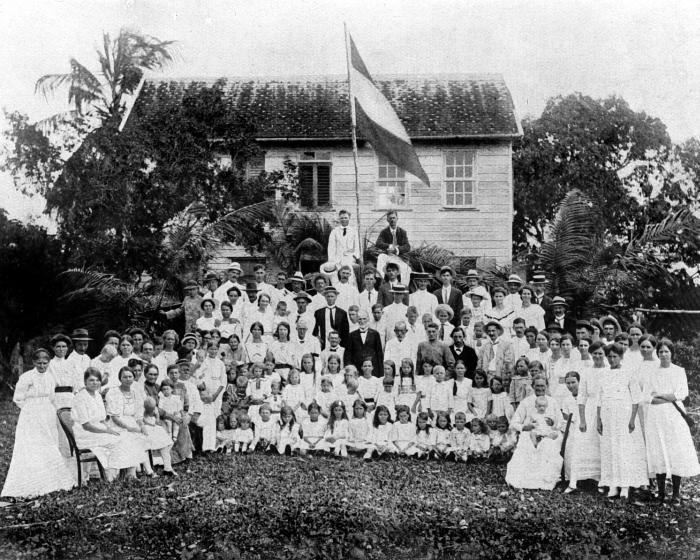
Dutch colonists in Suriname, 1920. Most Europeans left after independence in 1975.

==== Suriname and the Netherlands Antilles ====
In 1954, under the "Charter for the Kingdom of the Netherlands", the Netherlands, Suriname and the Netherlands Antilles (at the time including Aruba) became a composite state, known as the "Tripartite Kingdom of the Netherlands". The former colonies were granted autonomy, save for certain matters including defense, foreign affairs and citizenship, which were the responsibility of the Realm. In 1969, unrest in Curaçao led to Dutch marines being sent to quell rioting. In 1973, negotiations started in Suriname for independence, and full independence was granted in 1975, marking the end of the Dutch colonial empire, with 60,000 emigrants taking the opportunity of moving to the Netherlands.

In 1986, Aruba was allowed to secede from the Netherlands Antilles federation, and was pressured by the Netherlands to move to independence within ten years. However, in 1994, it was agreed that its status as a Realm in its own right could continue. On 10 October 2010, the Netherlands Antilles were dissolved. Effective on that date, Curaçao and Sint Maarten acceded to the same country status within the Kingdom that Aruba already enjoyed. The islands of Bonaire, Sint Eustatius and Saba were granted a status similar to Dutch municipalities, and are now sometimes referred to as the Caribbean Netherlands.

== Legacy ==
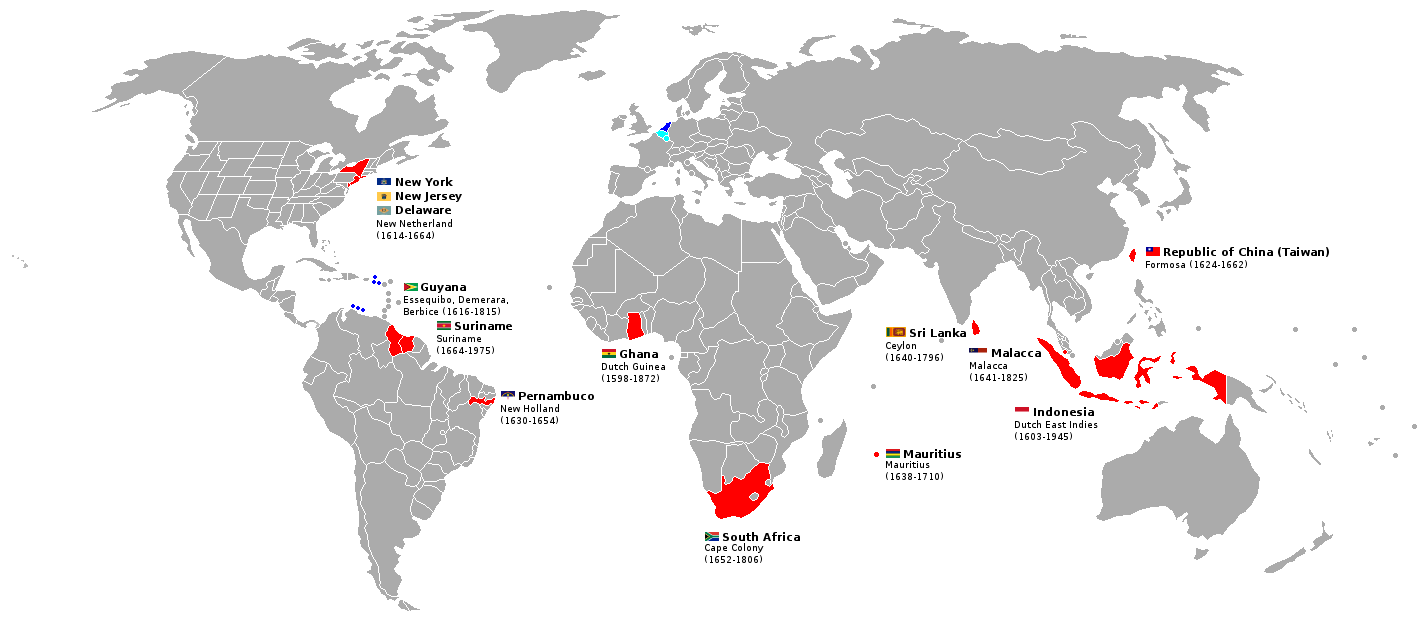
Contemporary countries and federated states which were significantly colonised by the Dutch. In the Netherlands, these countries are sometimes known as verwantschapslanden (kindred countries).

Generally, the Dutch do not celebrate their imperial past, and colonial history is not featured prominently in Dutch schoolbooks. This perspective on their imperial past has only recently started to shift.

In a survey conducted by YouGov in March 2019, 50% of respondents in the Netherlands said they felt some level of pride in the Dutch colonial empire, while 6% felt ashamed.

=== Dutch diaspora ===
In some Dutch colonies, there are major ethnic groups of Dutch ancestry descending from emigrated Dutch settlers. In South Africa, the Boers and Cape Dutch are collectively known as the Afrikaners. The Burgher people of Sri Lanka and the Indo people of Indonesia as well as the Creoles of Suriname are mixed race people of Dutch descent.

In the U.S., there have been three American presidents of Dutch descent: Martin Van Buren, the first president who was not of British descent, and whose first language was Dutch, the 26th president Theodore Roosevelt, and Franklin D. Roosevelt, the 32nd president, elected to four terms in office (1933 to 1945) and the only U.S. president to have served more than two terms.

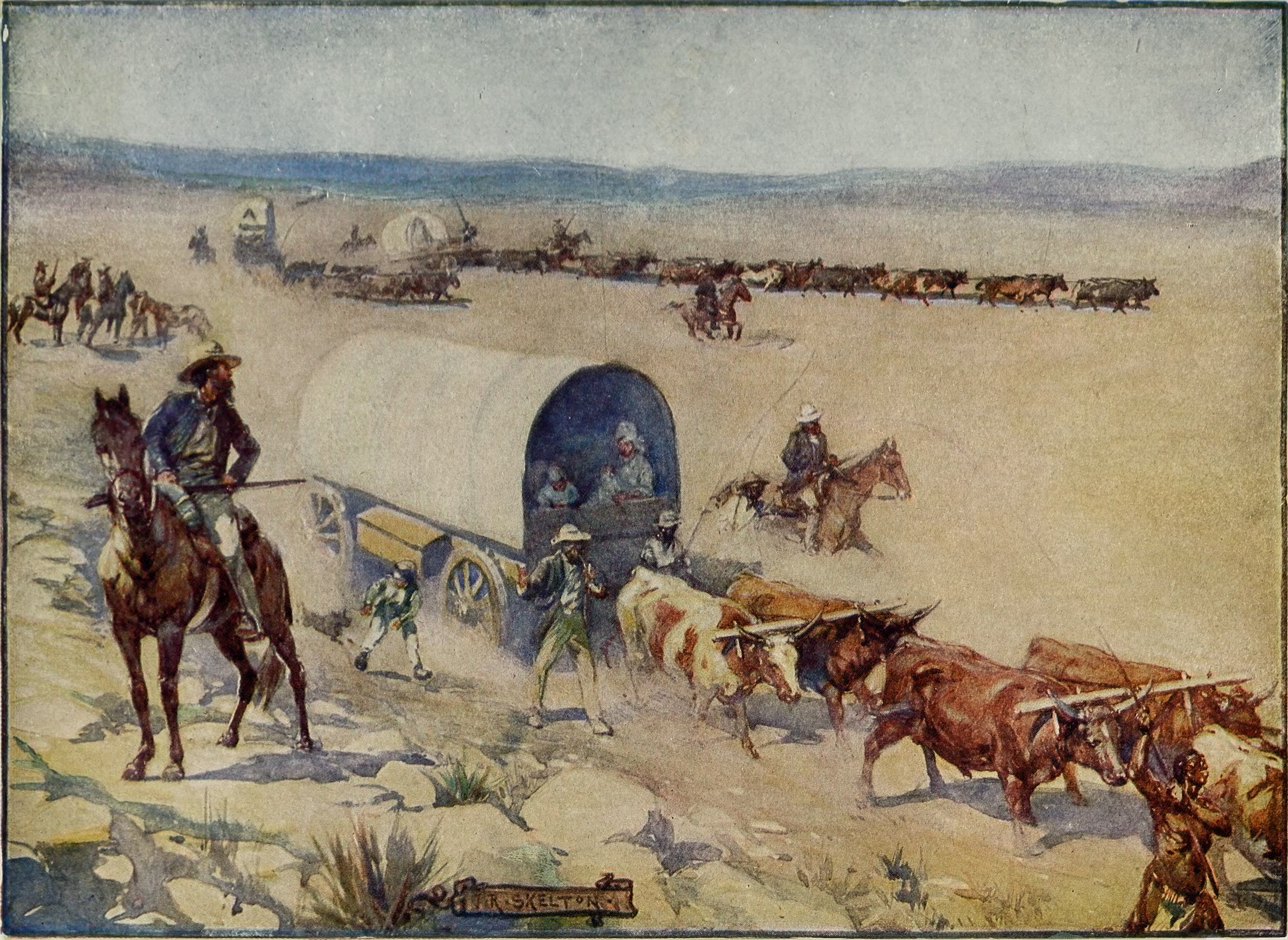
Boer Voortrekkers in South Africa

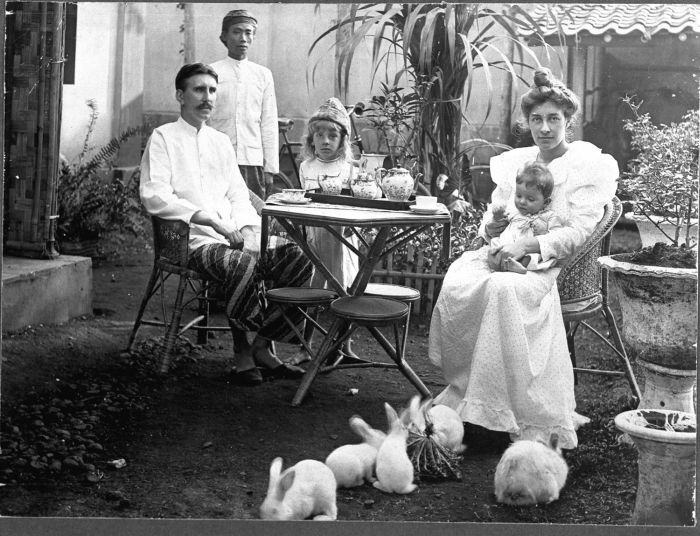
Dutch family in Java, 1902

=== Dutch language ===
==== Dutch in Southeast Asia ====
Despite the Dutch presence in Indonesia for almost 350 years, the Dutch language has no official status and the small minority that can speak the language fluently are either educated members of the oldest generation, or employed in the legal profession, as some legal codes are still available only in Dutch. The Indonesian language inherited many words from Dutch, both in words for everyday life, and as well in scientific or technological terminology. One scholar argues that 20% of Indonesian words can be traced back to Dutch words.

==== Dutch in South Asia ====
The century and half of Dutch rule in Ceylon (modern-day Sri Lanka) and southern India left few to no traces of the Dutch language.

==== Dutch in the Americas ====
In Suriname, Dutch is the official language. 82% of the population can speak Dutch fluently (Note: First language or "mother tongue", of 58% of the population, second language for 24%,) In Aruba, Bonaire, and Curaçao, Dutch is the official language but a first language for only 7–8% of the population; though most of the population is fluent in Dutch, which is generally the language of education.

The population of the three northern Antilles, Sint Maarten, Saba, and Sint Eustatius, is predominantly English-speaking.

In New Jersey, an extinct dialect of Dutch, Jersey Dutch, was spoken by descendants of 17th-century Dutch settlers in Bergen and Passaic counties, was noted to still be spoken as late as 1921. U.S. President Martin Van Buren, raised in a Dutch-speaking enclave in New York, had Dutch as his native language.

==== Dutch in Africa ====
The greatest linguistic legacy of the Netherlands was in its colony in South Africa, which attracted large numbers of Dutch farmer (in Dutch, Boer) settlers, who spoke a simplified form of Dutch called Afrikaans, which is largely mutually intelligible with Dutch. After the colony passed into British hands, the settlers spread into the hinterland, taking their language with them. As of 2005, there were 10 million people for whom Afrikaans is either a primary and secondary language, compared with over 22 million speakers of Dutch.

Other creole languages with Dutch linguistic roots are Papiamento still spoken in Aruba, Bonaire, Curaçao, and Sint Eustatius; Saramaccan and Sranan Tongo still spoken in Suriname; Berbice an extinct language in Guyana; Pecok spoken but in danger of extinction in Indonesia and the Netherlands; Albany Dutch spoken but in danger of extinction in the U.S.

Extinct Dutch-based creole languages include: Skepi (Guyana); Negerhollands (aka "Negro Dutch"), Jersey Dutch and Mohawk Dutch (U.S.), and Javindo (Java).

=== Placenames ===
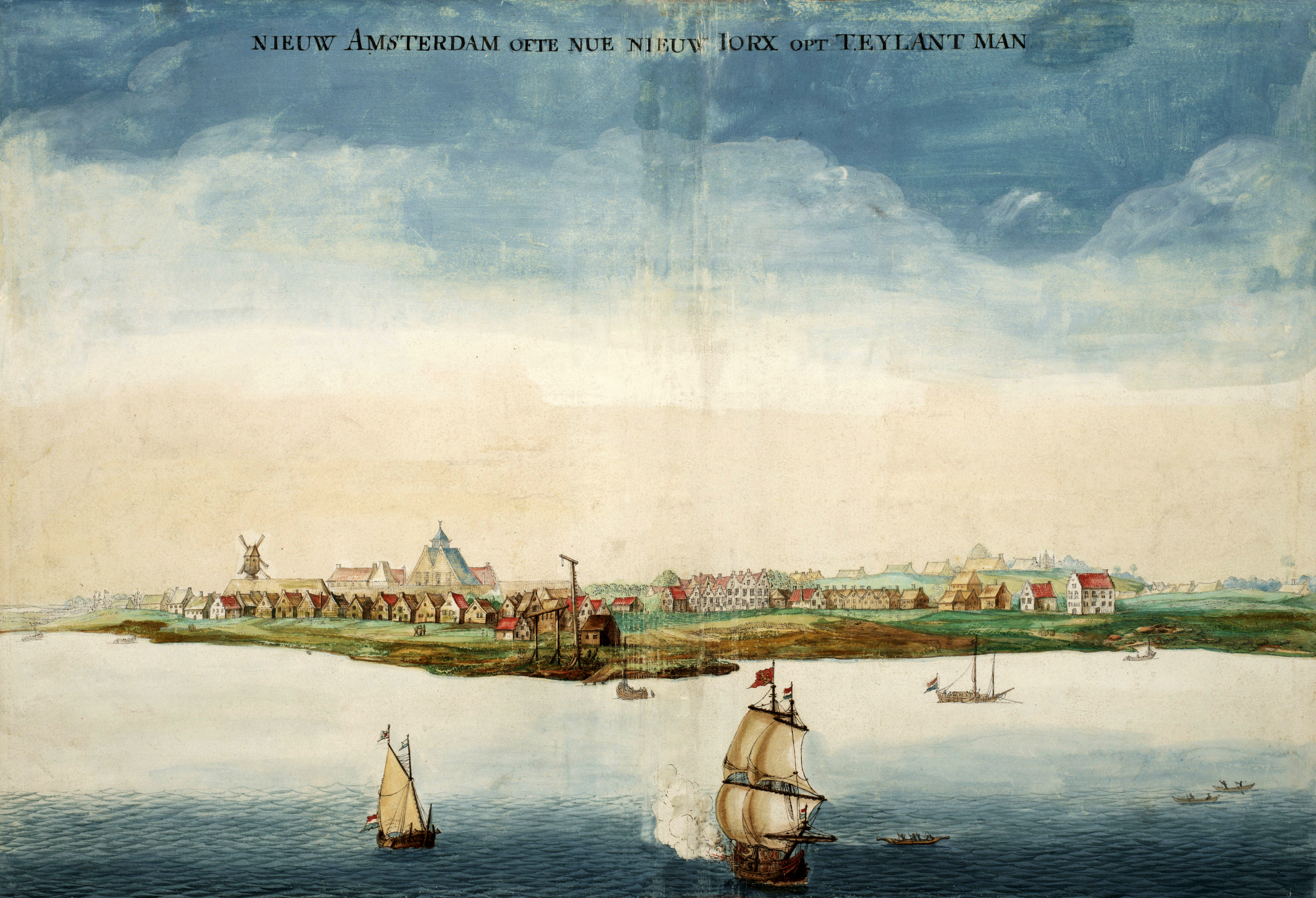
New Amsterdam as it appeared in 1664. Under British rule it became known as New York.

Some towns of New York and areas of New York City, once part of the colony of New Netherland have names of Dutch origin, such as Brooklyn (after Breukelen), Flushing (after Vlissingen), the Bowery (after Bouwerij, construction site), Harlem (after Haarlem), Coney Island (from Conyne Eylandt, modern Dutch spelling Konijneneiland: Rabbit island) and Staten Island (meaning "Island of the States"). The last Director-General of the colony of New Netherland, Pieter Stuyvesant, has bequeathed his name to a street, a neighborhood and a few schools in New York City, and the town of Stuyvesant. Many of the towns and cities along the Hudson in upstate New York have placenames with Dutch origins (for example Yonkers, Hoboken, Haverstraw, Claverack, Staatsburg, Catskill, Kinderhook, Coeymans, Rensselaer, Watervliet). Nassau County, one of the four that make up Long Island, is also of Dutch origin. The Schuylkill river that flows into the Delaware at Philadelphia is also a Dutch name meaning hidden or skulking river.

Many towns and cities in Suriname share names with cities in the Netherlands, such as Alkmaar, Wageningen, and Groningen. The capital of Curaçao is named Willemstad and the capitals of both Sint Eustatius and Aruba are named Oranjestad. The first is named after the Dutch Prince Willem II van Oranje-Nassau (William of Orange-Nassau) and the two others after the first part of the current Dutch royal dynasty.

In Indonesia, the Nassau District in Toba Regency, North Sumatra, is believed to be named after the House of Orange-Nassau. The Oranje Nassau Coal Mine in Banjar Regency was named after the royal house. Puncak Jaya, also known as Carstensz Pyramid, was named after Dutch explorer Jan Carstenszoon. The Lorentz National Park in Central Papua is named for Hendrikus Albertus Lorentz, a Dutch explorer who passed through the area on his 1909–10 expedition.

Many of South Africa's major cities have Dutch names i.e. Johannesburg, Kaapstad, Vereeniging, Bloemfontein and Vanderbijlpark.

The country name New Zealand originated with Dutch cartographers, who called the islands Nova Zeelandia, after the Dutch province of Zeeland. British explorer James Cook subsequently anglicized the name to New Zealand. (Note: The first European name for New Zealand was Staten Landt, the name given to it by the Dutch explorer Abel Tasman, who in 1642 became the first European to see the islands. Tasman assumed it was part of a southern continent connected with land discovered in 1615 off the southern tip of South America by Jacob Le Maire, which had been named Staten Landt, meaning "Land of the (Dutch) States-General".)

The Australian island state Tasmania is named after Dutch explorer Abel Tasman, who made the first reported European sighting of the island on 24 November 1642. He first named the island Anthony van Diemen's Land after his sponsor Anthony van Diemen, the Governor of the Dutch East Indies. The name was later shortened to Van Diemen's Land by the British. It was officially renamed in honor of its first European discoverer on 1 January 1856. Arnhem Land is named after the Dutch ship named Arnhem. The captain of the Arnhem (Willem van Coolsteerdt) also named the large island, east of Arnhem Groote Eylandt, in modern Dutch spelling Groot Eiland: Large Island.

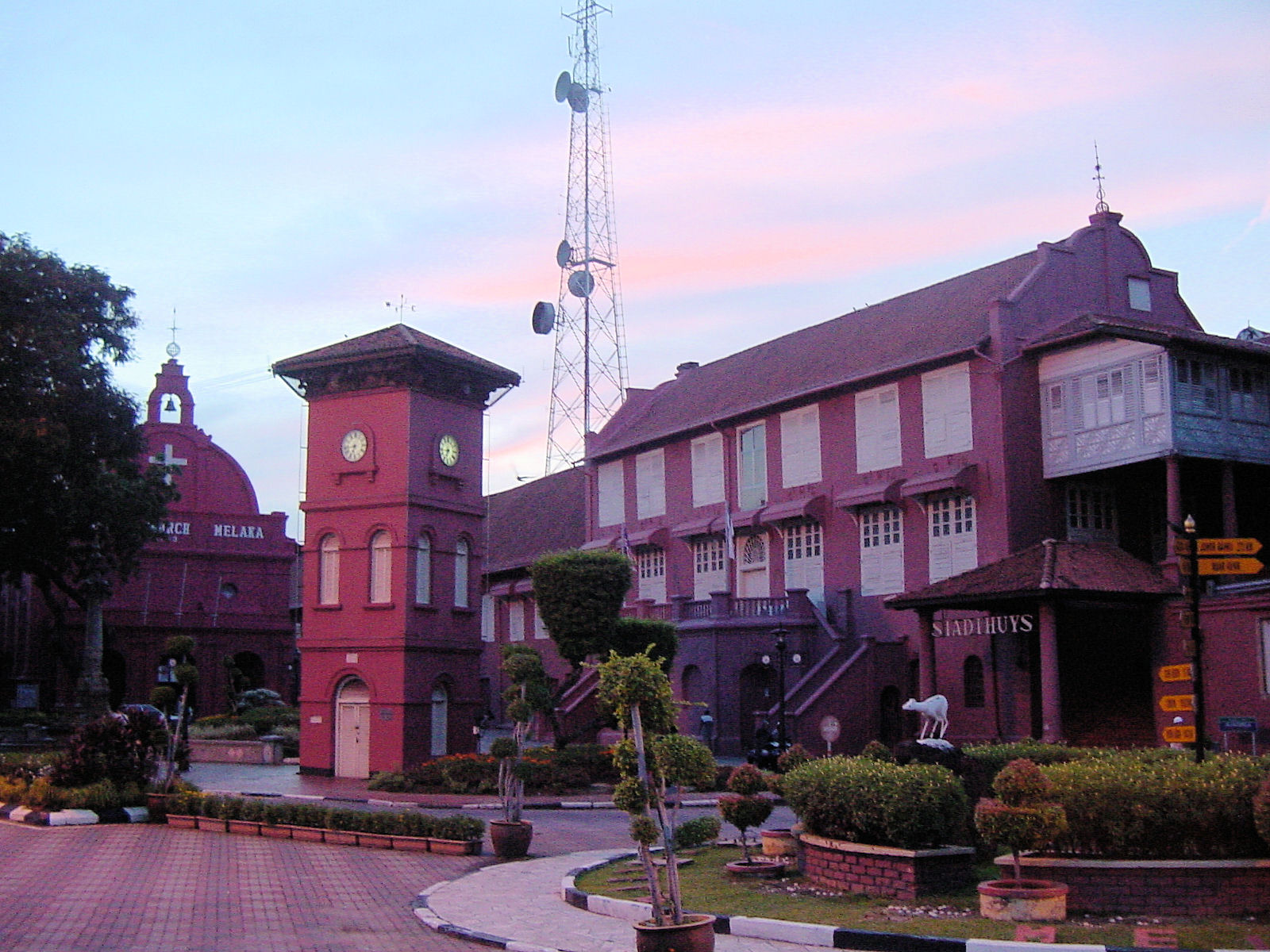
The Stadthuys in Malacca, Malaysia, believed to be the oldest Dutch building in Asia

=== Architecture ===
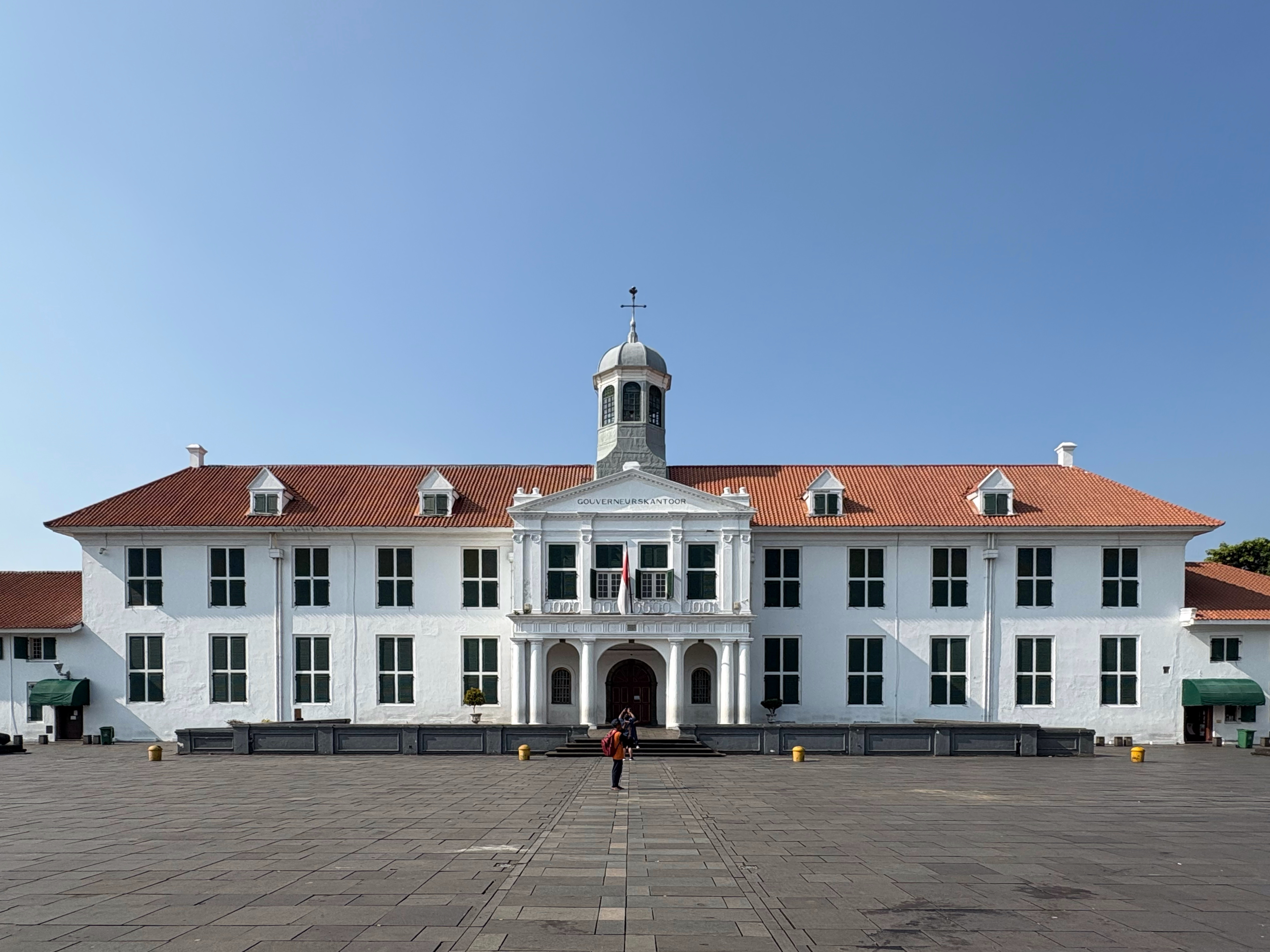
The Stadhuis of Batavia, said to be modelled after the Dam Palace itself.

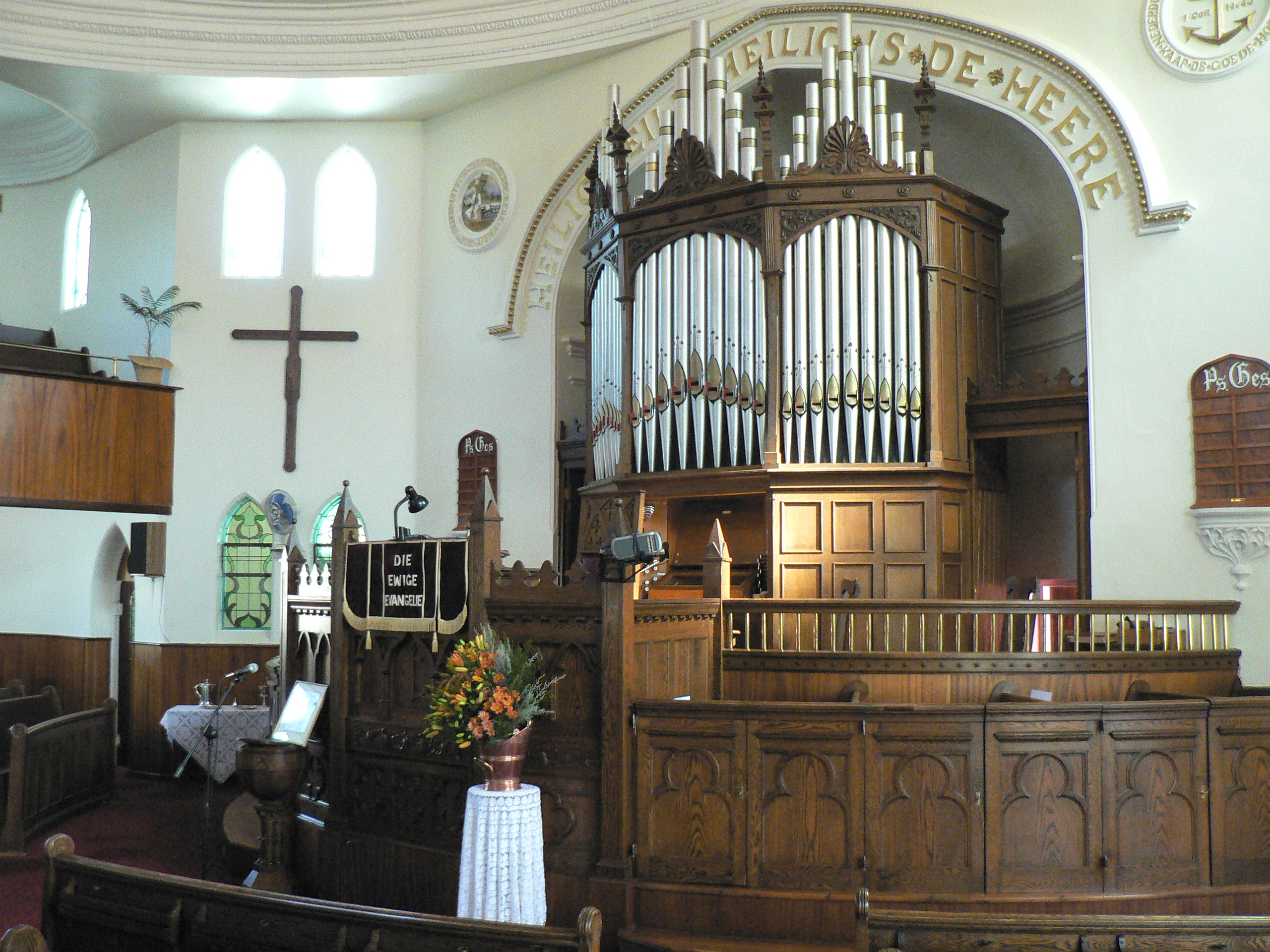
Christian cross, altar, pulpit, and organ in the Dutch Reformed Church in Vosburg, South Africa.

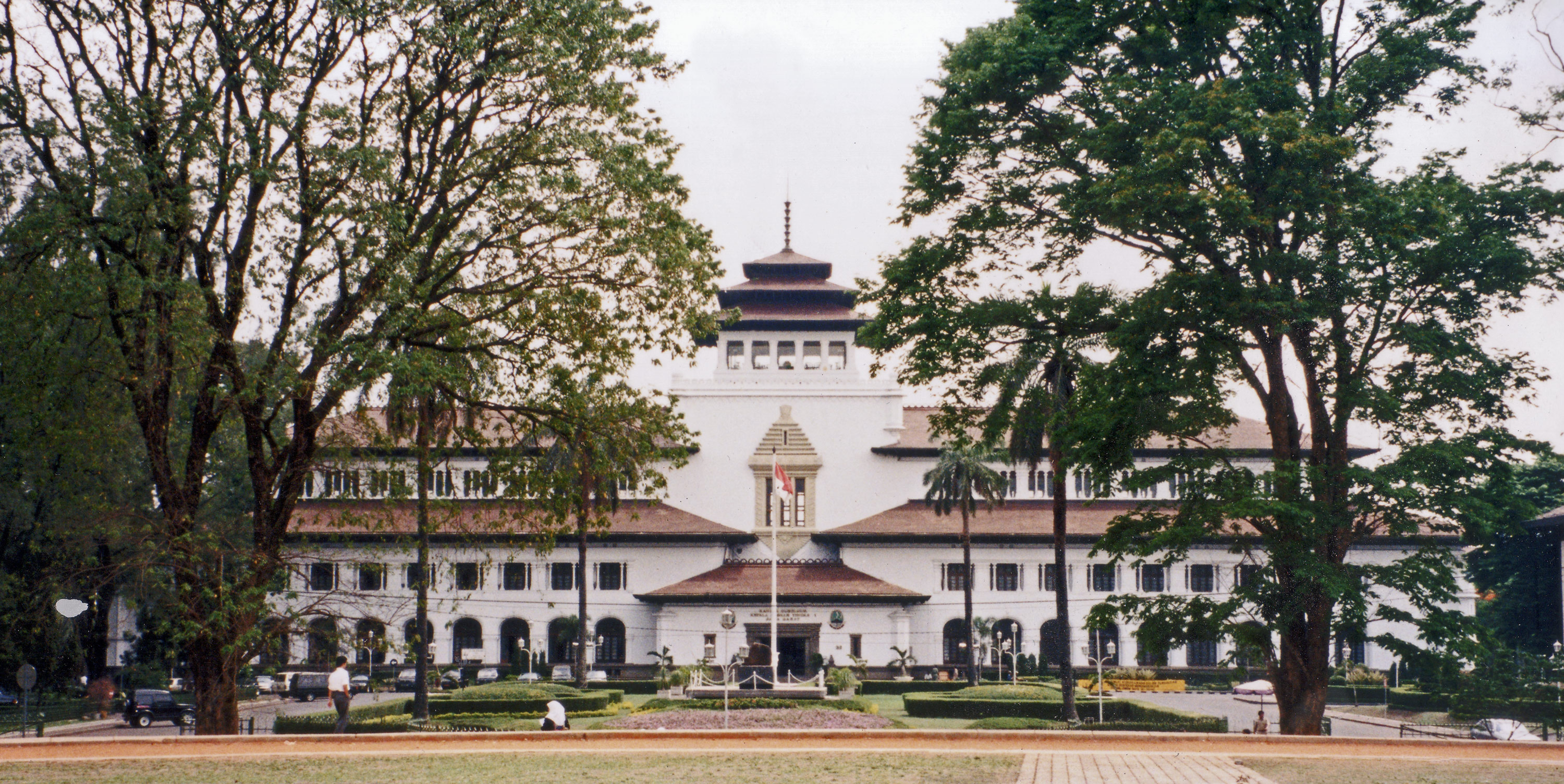
Gedung Sate, an early 20th century colonial building which incorporates modern Western neo-classical style with indigenous elements in Bandung, Indonesia.

In the Surinamese capital of Paramaribo, the Dutch Fort Zeelandia still stands today. The city itself also have retained most of its old street layout and architecture, which is part of the world's UNESCO heritage. In the centre of Malacca, Malaysia, the Stadthuys Building and Christ Church still stand as a reminder of Dutch occupation. There are still archaeological remains of Fort Goede Hoop (modern Hartford, Connecticut) and Fort Orange (modern Albany, New York).

Dutch architecture is easy to see in Aruba, Curaçao, Bonaire, and Sint Eustatius. The Dutch style buildings are especially visible in Willemstad, with its steeply pitched gables, large windows and soaring finials.

Dutch architecture can also be found in Sri Lanka, especially in Galle where the Dutch fortification and canal have been retained intact, even to an extent the former tropical Villas of the VOC officials. Some of the most prominent example of these architecture is the former governor's mansion in Galle, currently known as Amangalla Hotel and the Old Dutch Reformed Church. In the capital Colombo, many of the Dutch and Portuguese architecture around The Fort have been demolished during the British period, few of the remaining include Old Colombo Dutch Hospital and Wolvendaal Church.

During the period of Dutch colonisation in South Africa, a distinctive type of architecture, known as Cape Dutch architecture, was developed. These style of architecture can be found in historical towns such as Stellenbosch, Swellendam, Tulbagh, and Graaff-Reinet. In the former Dutch capital of Cape Town, nearly nothing from the VOC era have survived except the Castle of Good Hope.

Although the Dutch already started erecting buildings shortly after they arrived on the shores of Batavia, most Dutch-built constructions still standing today in Indonesia stem from the 19th and 20th centuries. Forts from the colonial era, used for defense purposes, still line a number of major coastal cities across the archipelago. The largest number of surviving Dutch buildings can be found on Java and Sumatra, particularly in cities such as Jakarta, Bandung, Semarang, Yogyakarta, Surabaya, Cirebon, Pasuruan, Bukittinggi, Sawahlunto, Medan, Padang, and Malang. There are also significant examples of 17–19th century Dutch architecture around Banda Neira, Nusa Laut, and Saparua, the former main spices islands, which due to limited economic development have retained many of its colonial elements. Another prominent example of Dutch colonial architecture is Fort Rotterdam in Makassar. The earlier Dutch construction mostly replicate the architecture style in the Homeland (such as Toko Merah). However these buildings were unsuitable to tropical climate and expensive to maintain. And as a result the Dutch officials begun to adapt to the tropical condition by applying native elements such as wide-open veranda, ventilation and indigenous high pitch roofing into their villas. "In the beginning (of the Dutch presence), Dutch construction on Java was based on colonial architecture which was modified according to the tropical and local cultural conditions," Indonesian art and design professor Pamudji Suptandar wrote. This was dubbed arsitektur Indis (Indies architecture), which combines the existing traditional Hindu-Javanese style with European forms.

Many public buildings still standing and in use in Jakarta, such as the presidential palace, the finance ministry and the performing arts theater, were built in the 19th century in the classicist style. At the turn of the 20th century and partially due to the Dutch Ethical Policy, the number of Dutch people migrating to the colony grew with economic expansion. The increasing number of middle class population led to the development of Garden Suburbs in major city across the Indies, many of the houses were built in various style ranging from the Indies style, Neo-Renaissance to modern Art Deco. Some examples of these residential district include Menteng in Jakarta, Darmo in Surabaya, Polonia in Medan, Kotabaru in Yogyakarta, New Candi in Semarang and as well as most of North Bandung. Indonesia also became an experimental ground for Dutch Art Deco architectural movement such as Nieuwe Zakelijkheid, De Stijl, Nieuw Indische and Amsterdam School. Several famous architect such as Wolff Schoemaker and Henri Maclaine Pont also made an attempt to modernize indigenous architecture, resulting several unique design such as Pohsarang Church and Bandung Institute of Technology. The largest stock of these Art Deco building can be found in the city of Bandung, which "architecturally" can be considered the most European city in Indonesia.

Since Indonesia's independence, few governments have shown interest in the conservation of historical buildings. Many architecturally grand buildings have been torn down in the past decades to erect shopping centres or office buildings e.g. Hotel des Indes (Batavia), Harmony Society, Batavia. Presently, however, more Indonesians have become aware of the value of preserving their old buildings.

"A decade ago, most people thought I was crazy when they learned of my efforts to save the old part of Jakarta. A few years later, the negative voices started to disappear, and now many people are starting to think with me: how are we going to save our city. In the past using the negative sentiment towards the colonial era was often used as an excuse to disregard protests against the demolition of historical buildings. An increasing number of people now see the old colonial buildings as part of their city's overall heritage rather than focusing on its colonial aspect.", leading Indonesian architect and conservationist Budi Lim said.

=== Infrastructure ===
The Great Post Road (Grote Postweg), spanning West to East Java

Beyond Indonesia's art deco architecture also much of the country's rail and road infrastructure as well as its major cities were built during the colonial period. Many of Indonesia's main cities were mere rural townships before colonial industrialization and urban development. Examples on Java include the capital Jakarta and Bandung, outside Java examples include Ambon and Menado city. Most main railroads and rail stations on Java as well as the main road, called Daendels Great Post Road (Dutch: Grote Postweg) after the Governor General commissioning the work, connecting west to east Java were also built during the Dutch East Indies era.

Between 1800 and 1950, Dutch engineers created an infrastructure including 67,000 kilometers (42,000 mi) of roads, 7,500 kilometers (4,700 mi) of railways, many large bridges, modern irrigation systems covering 1.4 million hectares (5,400 sq mi) of rice fields, several international harbors, and 140 public drinking water systems. These Dutch constructed public works became the material base of the colonial and postcolonial Indonesian state.

=== Agriculture ===
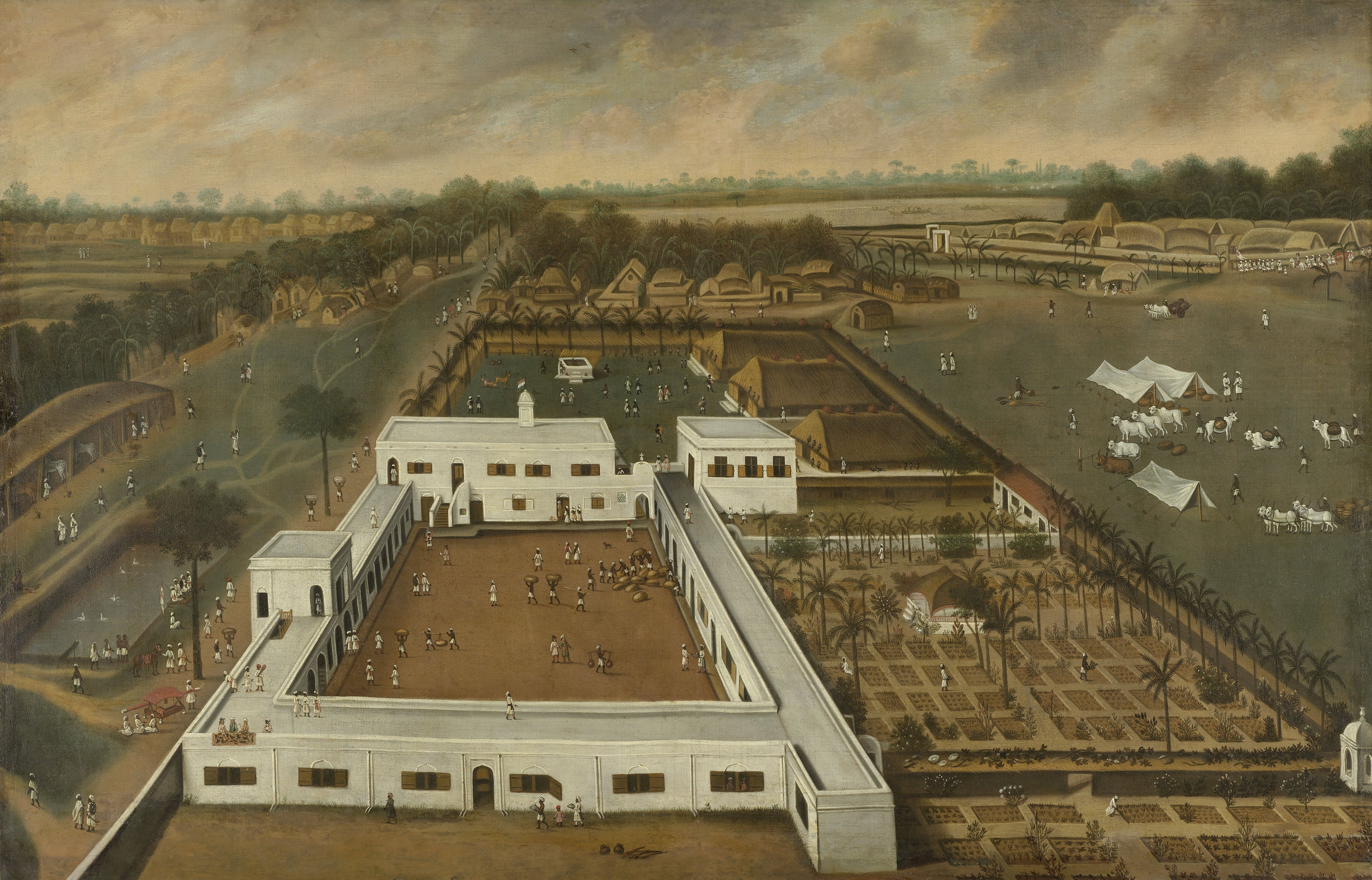
Dutch plantation in Mughal Bengal, 1665

Crops such like coffee, tea, cocoa, tobacco and rubber were all introduced by the Dutch. The Dutch were the first to start the spread of the coffee plant in Central and South America, and by the early 19th century Java was the third largest producer in the world. In 1778, the Dutch brought cacao from the Philippines to Indonesia and commenced mass production. Currently Indonesia is the world's second largest producer of natural rubber, a crop that was introduced by the Dutch in the early 20th century. Tobacco was introduced from the Americas and in 1863, the first plantation was established by the Dutch. Today Indonesia is not only the oldest industrial producer of tobacco, but also the second largest consumer of tobacco.

=== Scientific discoveries ===
Java Man was discovered by Eugène Dubois in Indonesia in 1891. The Komodo dragon was firstly described by Peter Ouwens in Indonesia in 1912 after an airplane crash in 1911 and rumors about living dinosaurs on Komodo Island in 1910.

=== Sport ===
==== Suriname ====
Many Suriname-born football players and Dutch-born football players of Surinamese descent, like Gerald Vanenburg, Ruud Gullit, Frank Rijkaard, Edgar Davids, Clarence Seedorf, Patrick Kluivert, Aron Winter, Georginio Wijnaldum, Virgil van Dijk and Jimmy Floyd Hasselbaink have turned out to play for the Dutch national team. In 1999, Humphrey Mijnals, who played for both Suriname and the Netherlands, was elected Surinamese footballer of the century. Another famous player is André Kamperveen, who captained Suriname in the 1940s and was the first Surinamese to play professionally in the Netherlands.

Suriname discourages dual citizenship and Surinamese-Dutch players who have picked up a Netherlands passport – which, crucially, offers legal work status in almost any European league – are barred from selection to the national team. In 2014, inspired by the success of teams with dual nationals, especially Algeria, SVB president John Krishnadath submitted a proposal to the national assembly to allow dual citizenship for athletes with the then-goal of reaching the 2018 FIFA World Cup finals. In order to support this project, a team with professional players of Surinamese origin was assembled and played an exhibition match on 26 December 2014 at the Andre Kamperveen Stadion. The project is managed by Nordin Wooter and David Endt, who have set up a presentation and sent invitations to 100 players of Surinamese origin, receiving 85 positive answers. Dean Gorré was named to coach this special selection. FIFA supported the project and granted insurance for the players and clubs despite the match being unofficial. In November 2019, it was announced that a so-called sports passport would allow Dutch professional footballers from the Surinamese diaspora to represent Suriname.

Suriname also has a national korfball team, with korfball being a Dutch sport. Vinkensport is also practised in Suriname, as are popular among the Dutch sports of volleyball and troefcall.

==== South Africa ====
Ajax Cape Town were a professional football team named and owned by Ajax Amsterdam, replicating their crest and colours.

The Dutch sport of korfball is administered by the South African Korfball Federation, who manage the South Africa national korfball team. The 2019 IKF World Korfball Championship was held in August 2019 in Durban, South Africa.

==== Indonesia ====
Many Dutch-born football players of Indonesian descent, like Sonny Silooy, Wilfred Bouma, Giovanni van Bronckhorst, John Heitinga, Denny Landzaat, Roy Makaay, and Tijjani Reijnders have turned out to play for the Dutch national team. In recent years, the Indonesian Football Association (PSSI) has implemented a naturalization program for players of Indonesian descent in Europe, particularly the Netherlands, to improve the quality of the Indonesian national team. This program, which was initiated during the era of coach Shin Tae-yong, has naturalized mostly Dutch-born football players such as Jay Idzes, Justin Hubner, Rafael Struick, Ivar Jenner, Mees Hilgers, and Eliano Reijnders.

The Indonesian football league started around 1930 in the Dutch colonial era. The Indonesian men's team was the first Asian team to qualify for the FIFA World Cup; in 1938 FIFA World Cup they played as the Dutch East Indies. Association football is now the most popular sport in Indonesia, in terms of annual attendance, participation and revenue and it is played on all levels, from children to middle-aged men.

The Indonesian Tennis Association was also founded during Dutch rule in 1935, and has a long history of fielding its national Fed Cup team and Davis Cup team, although the first participation's in the 60s were not till after independence.

As in the Netherlands, volleyball remains a popular sport, with the Indonesian Volleyball Federation organising both the Men's Pro Liga and women's Pro Liga and administers the men's and women's national teams.

The Dutch sport of korfball is also practised, and there is a national korfball team.

== Territorial evolution ==
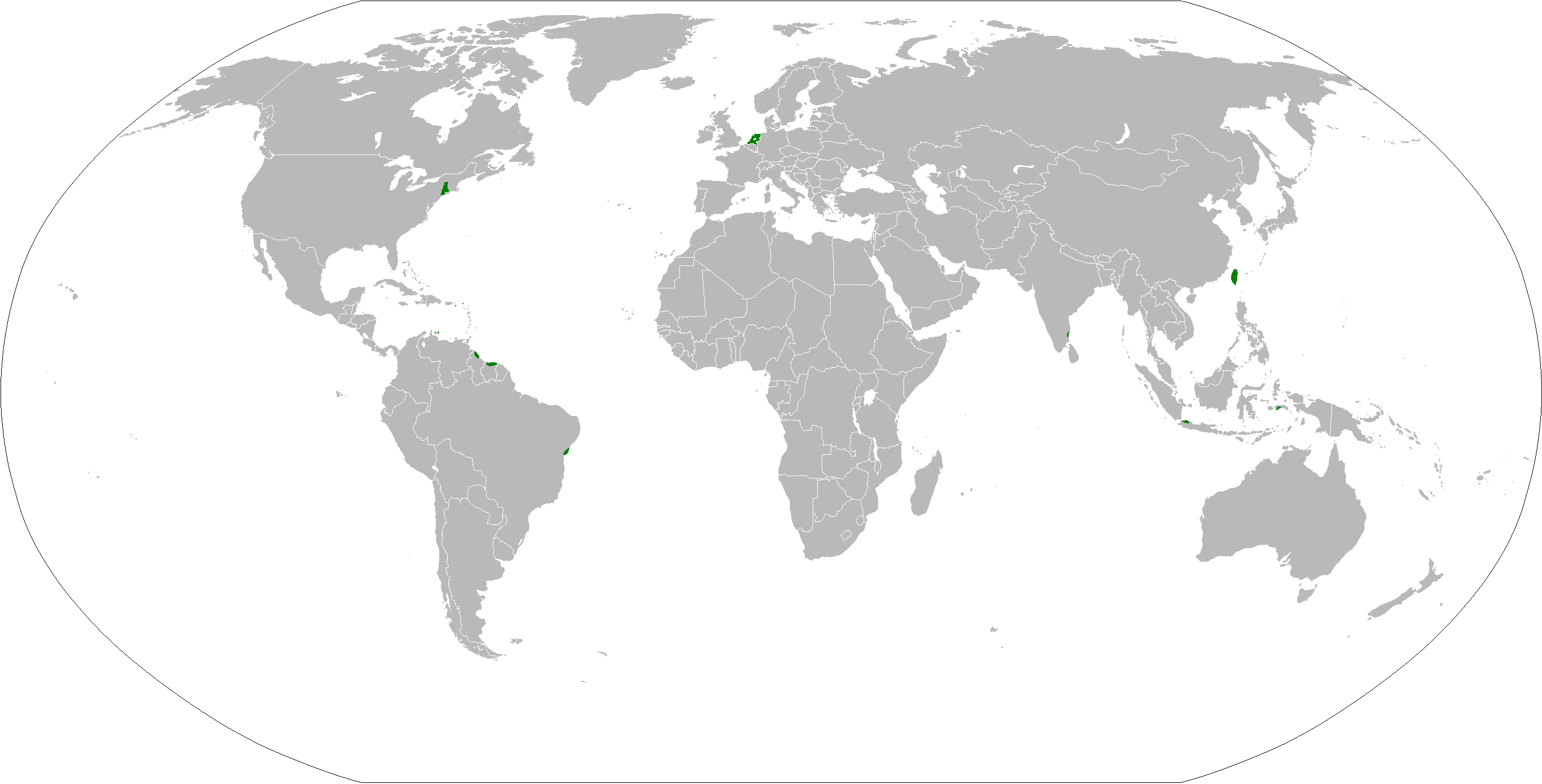
The Dutch Empire in 1630

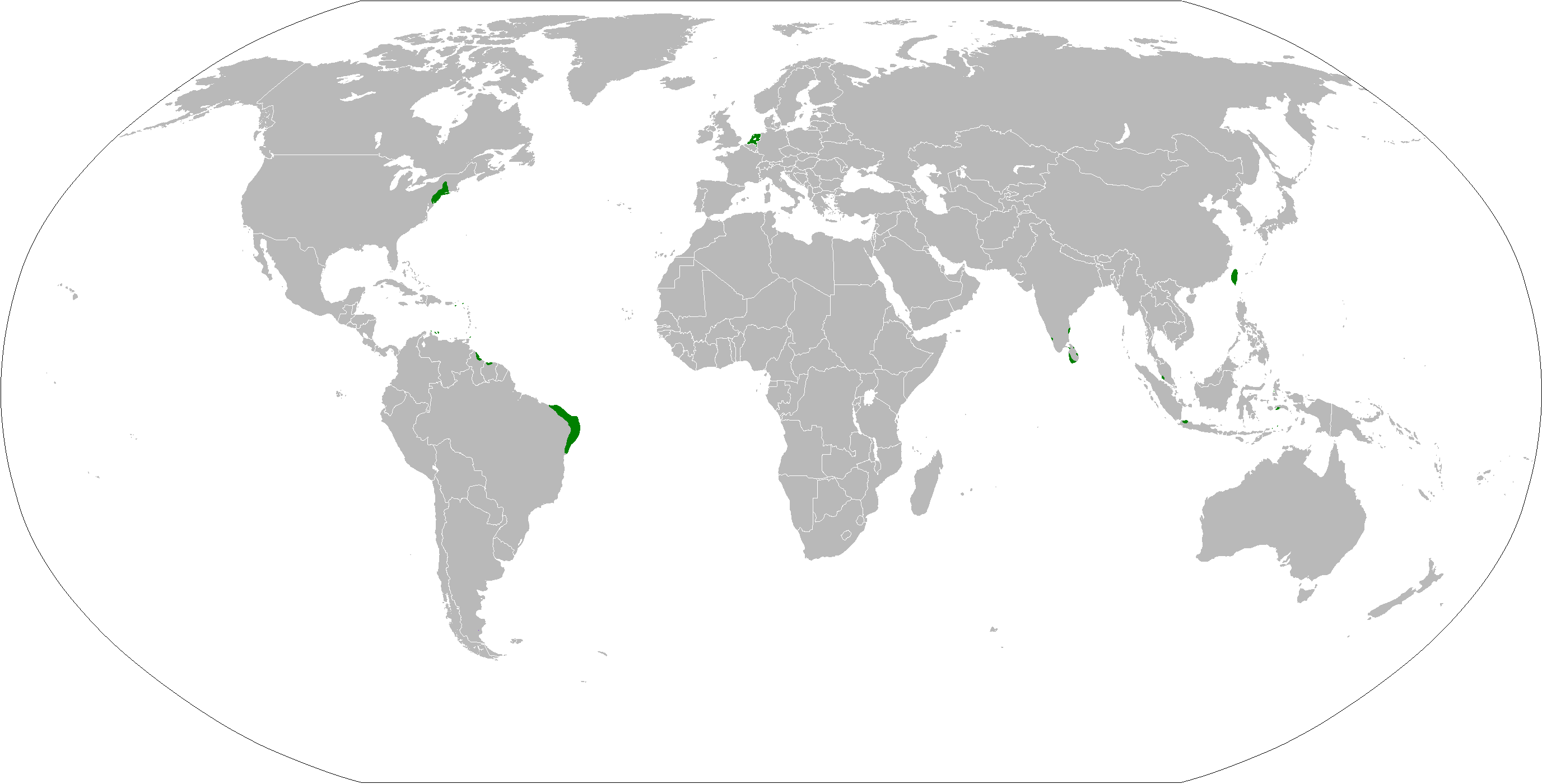
The Dutch Empire in 1650

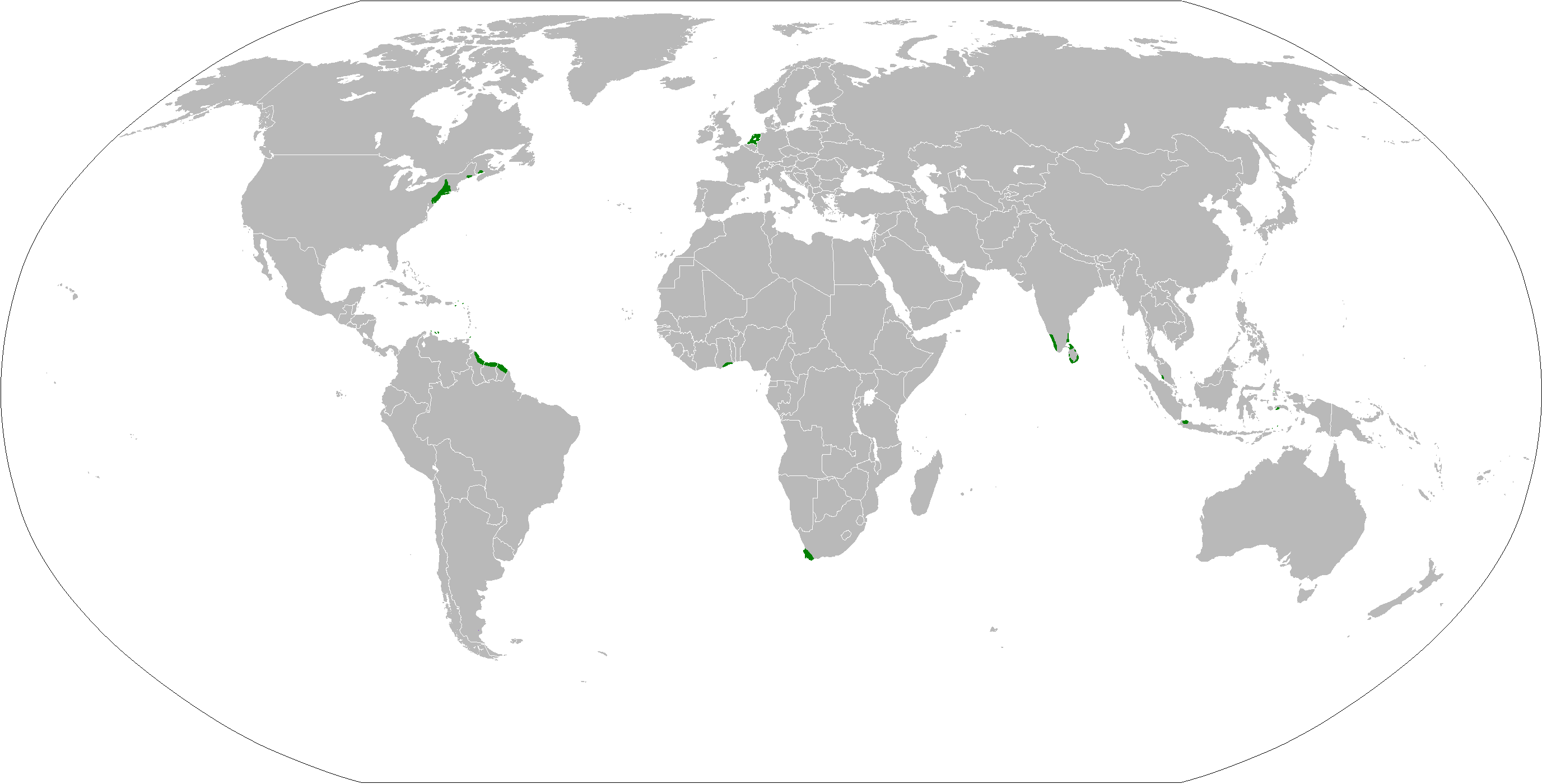
The Dutch Empire in 1674

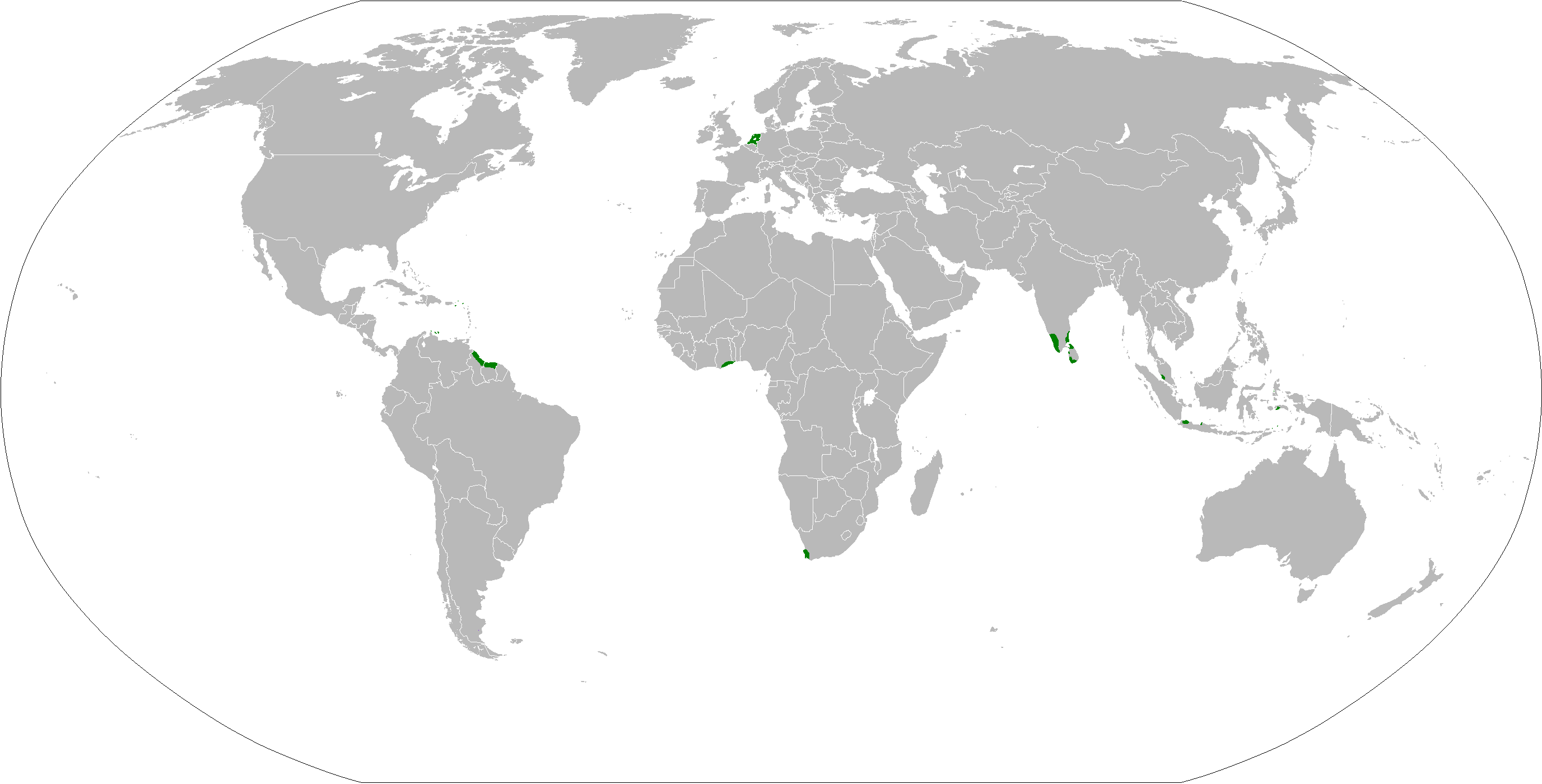
The Dutch Empire in 1700

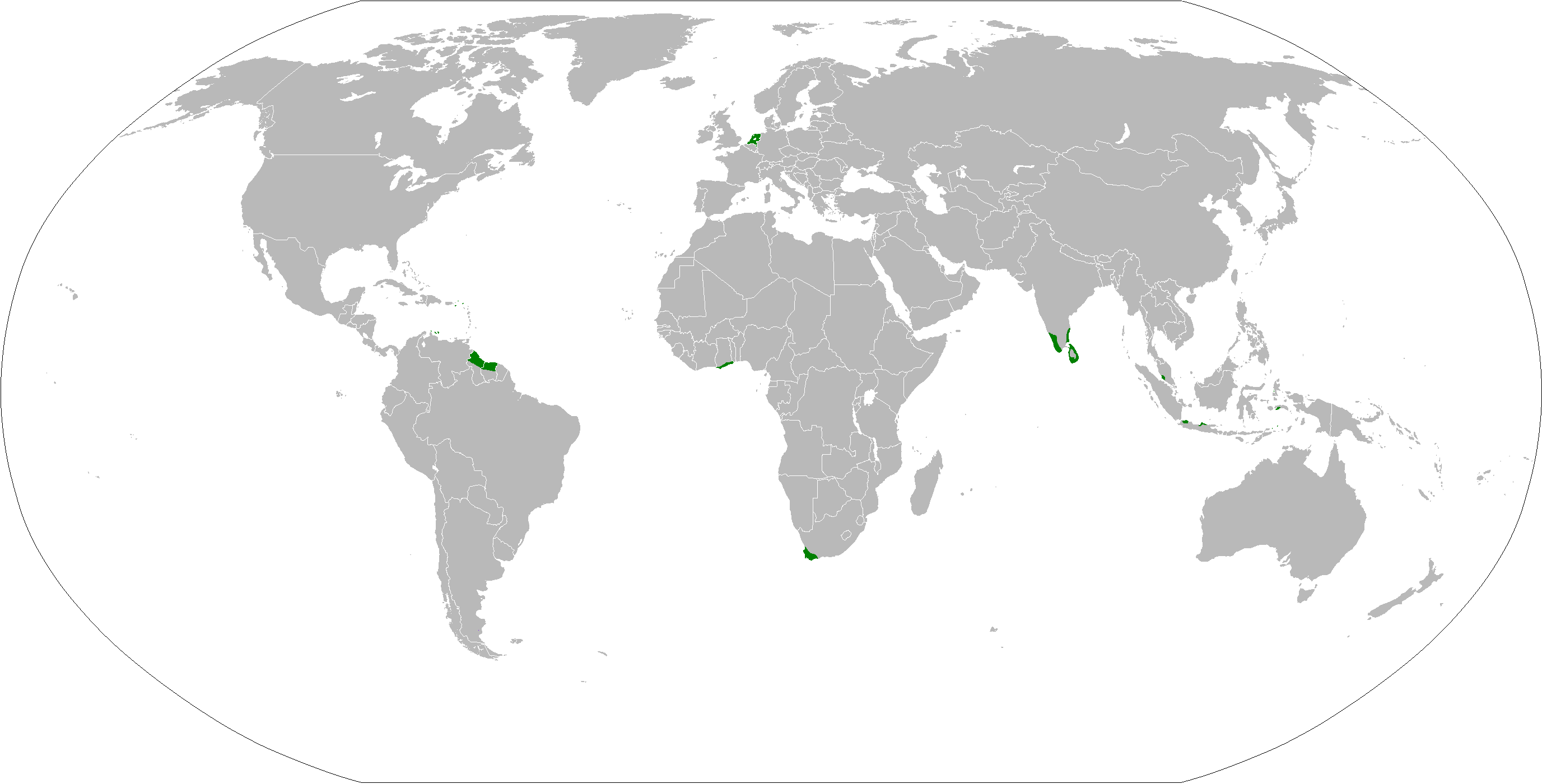
The Dutch Empire in 1750

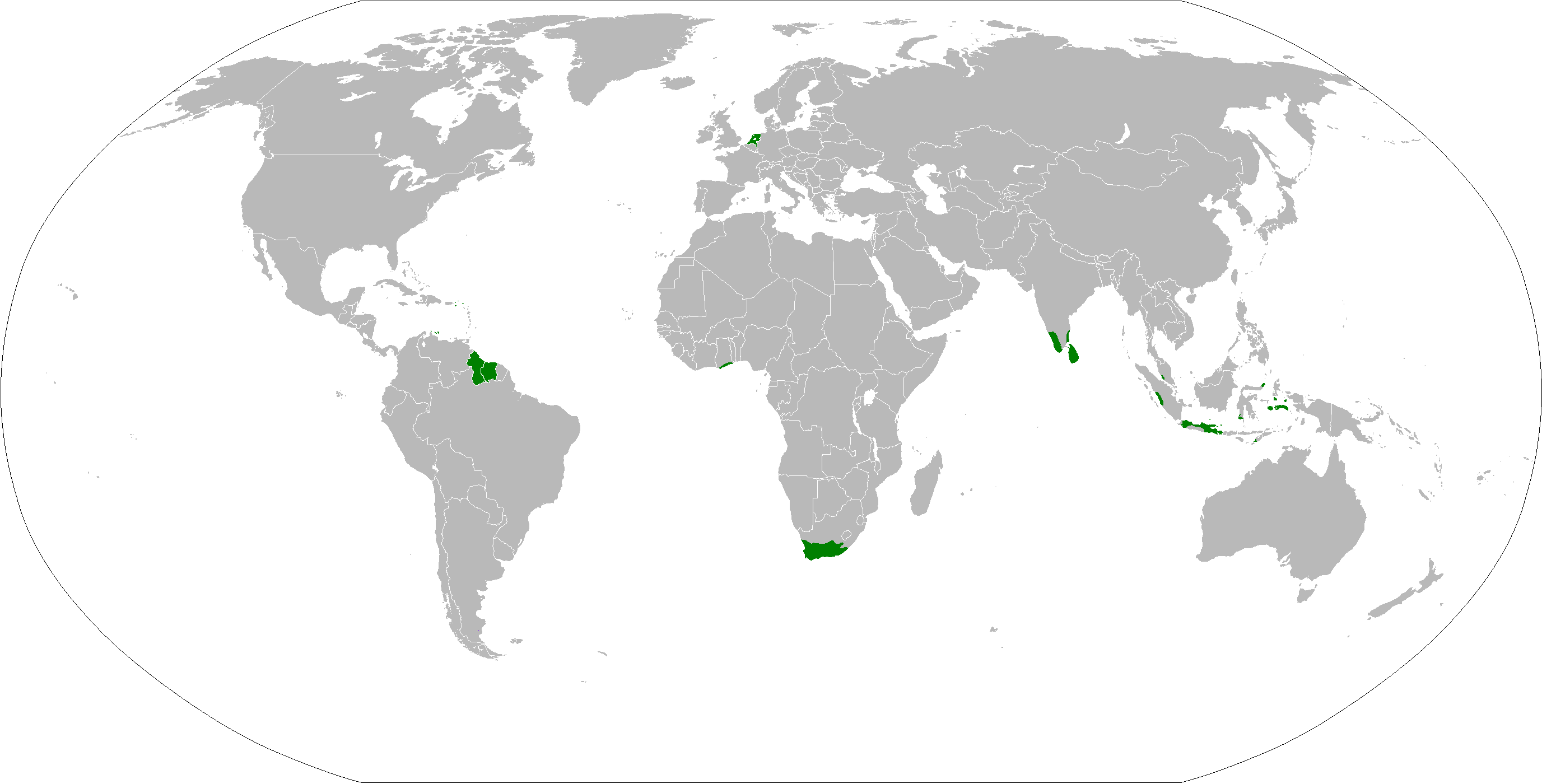
The Dutch Empire in 1795

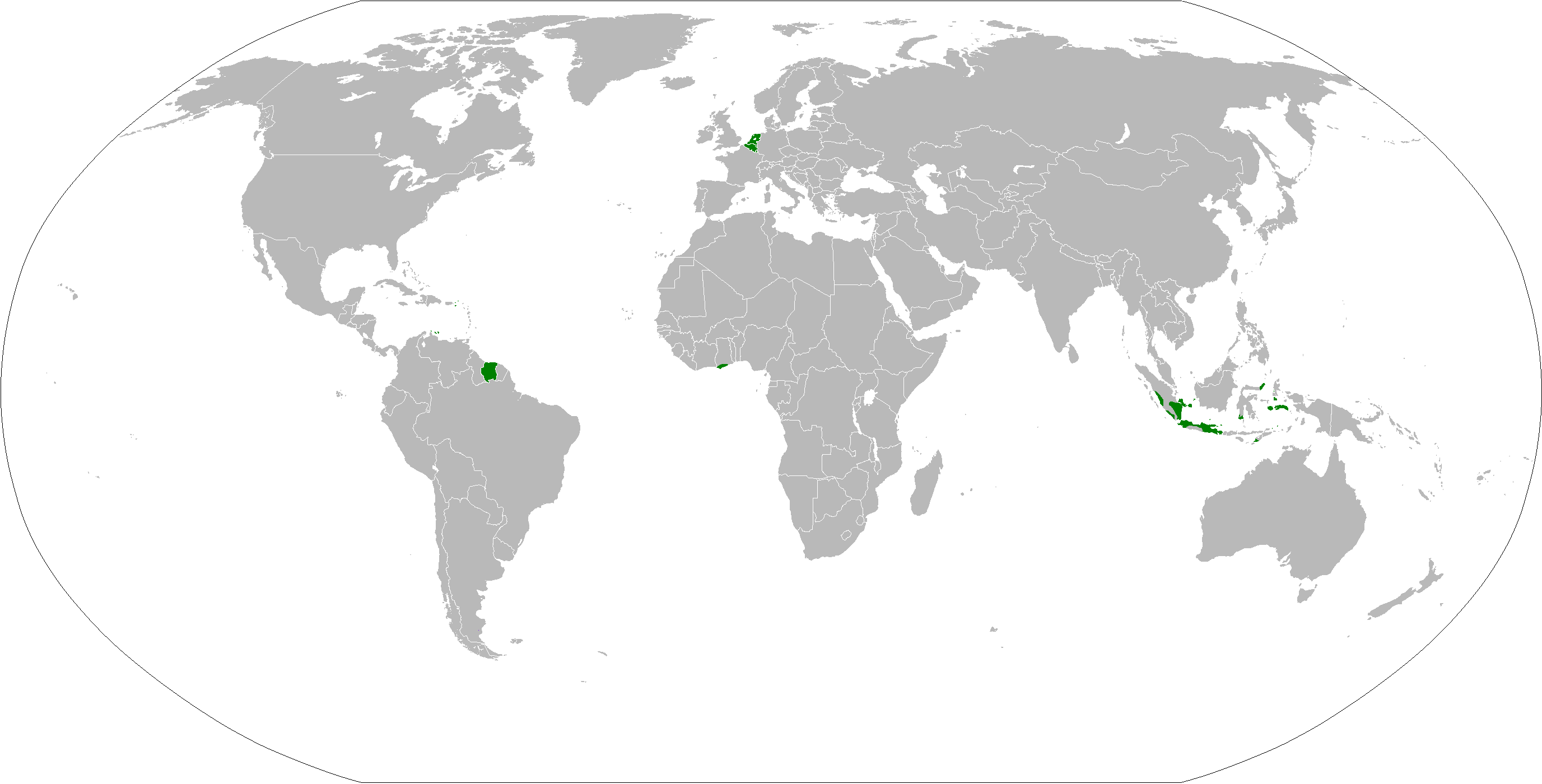
The Dutch Empire in 1830

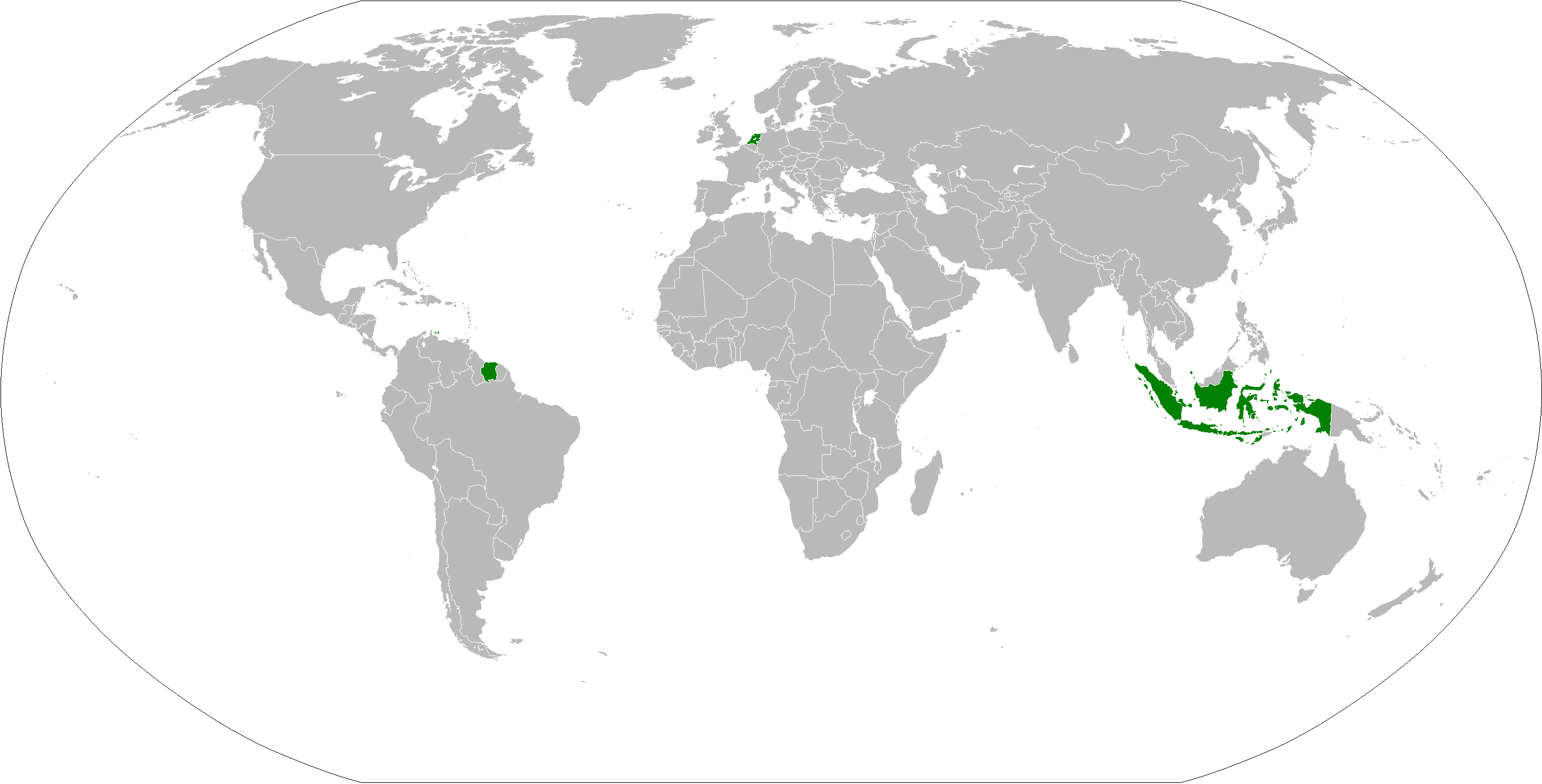
The Dutch Empire prior to World War II

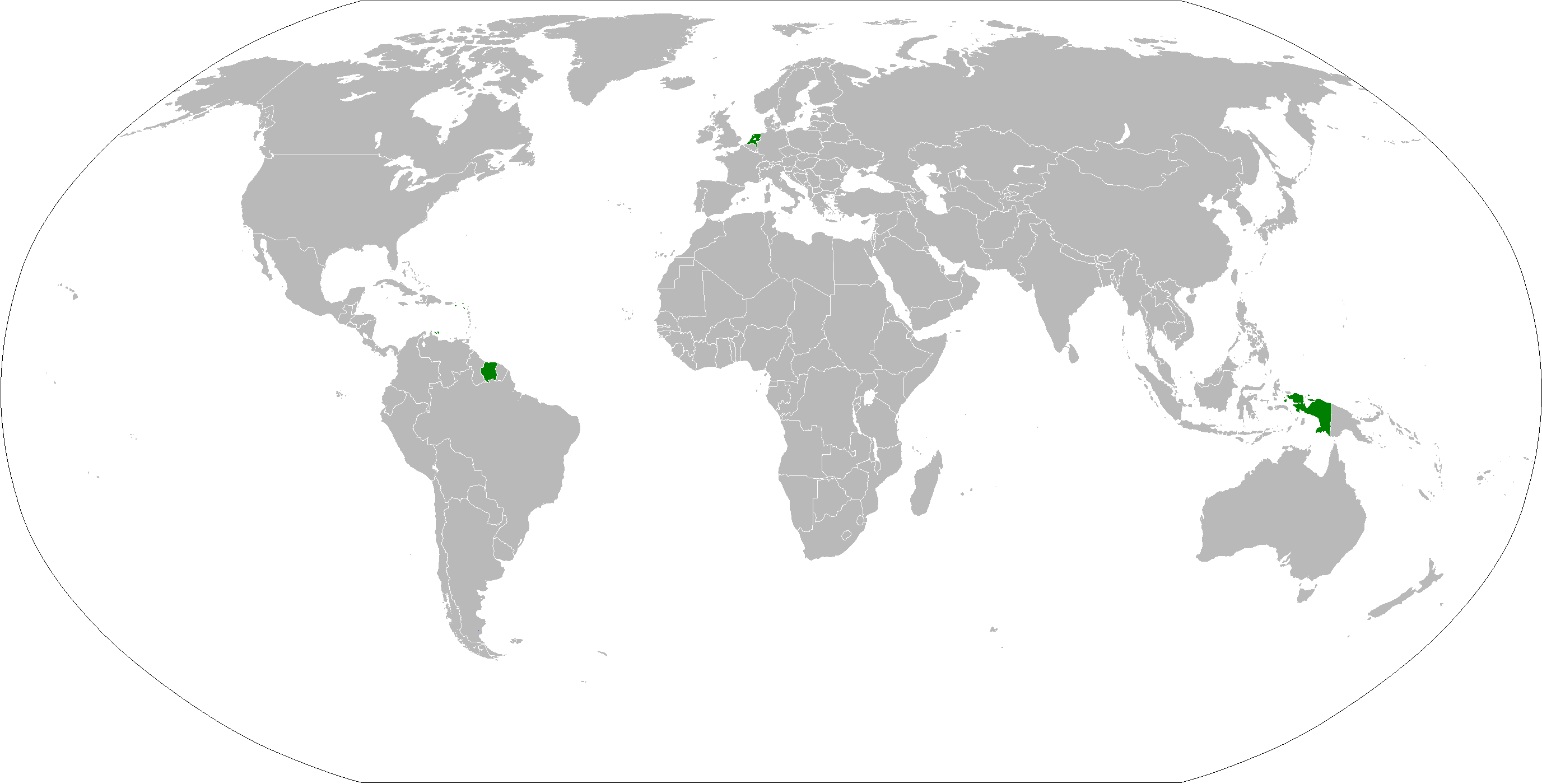
The Dutch Empire in 1960

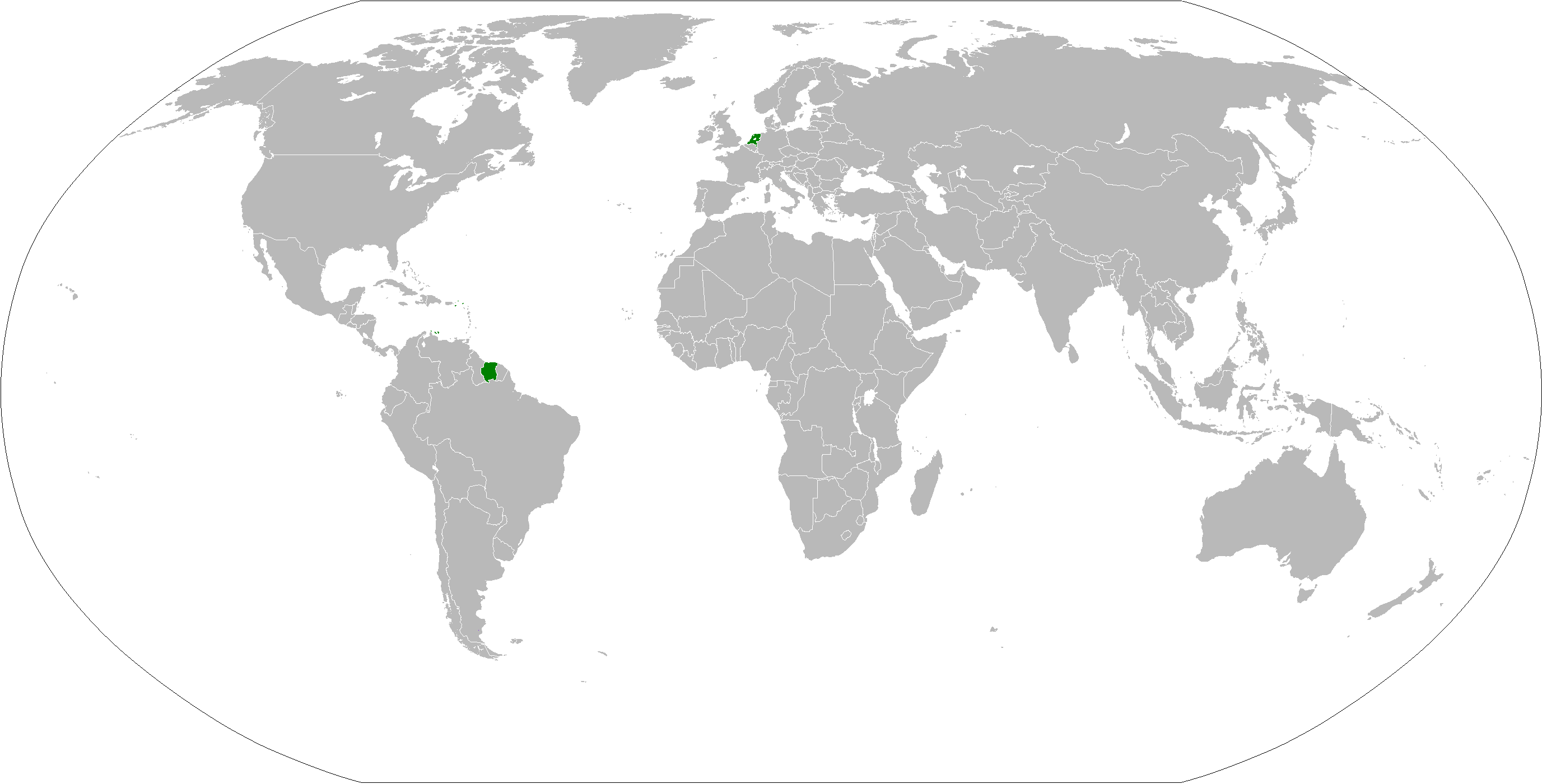
The Dutch Empire in 1975

== See also ==
- Dutch colonization of the Americas
- Dutch Language Union
- List of Dutch East India Company trading posts
- Ministry of the Colonies (Netherlands)

== Bibliography ==
- Ammon, Ulrich (2005). Sociolinguistics.
- Baker, Colin (1998). Encyclopedia of Bilingualism and Bilingual Education. Multilingual Matters.
- Cook, Harold John (2007). Matters of Exchange: Commerce, Medicine, and Science in the Dutch Golden Age. Yale University Press. ISBN 978-0300134926.
- Booij, G.E. (1995). The Phonology of Dutch.
- Borschberg, P. (2013). "From Self-Defense to an Instrument of War: Dutch Privateering Around the Malay Peninsula in the Early Seventeenth Century". Journal of Early Modern History. 17 (1). Brill: 35–52. doi:10.1163/15700658-12342356.
- Boxer, C.R. (1965). The Dutch Seaborne Empire 1600–1800. Hutchinson.
- Boxer, C.R. (1969). The Portuguese Seaborne Empire 1415–1825. Hutchinson. ISBN 9780091310714.
- Davies, K.G. (1974). The North Atlantic World in the Seventeenth Century. University of Minnesota. ISBN 9780816607136.
- Li (李), Qingxin (庆新) (2006). Maritime Silk Road (海上丝绸之路英). Translated by William W. Wang. 五洲传播出版社. ISBN 978-7508509327.
- Wills, John E. (2010). China and Maritime Europe, 1500–1800: Trade, Settlement, Diplomacy, and Missions. Contributors: John Cranmer-Byng, Willard J. Peterson, Jr, John W. Witek. Cambridge University Press. ISBN 9780521432603. OL 24524224M.
- L, Klemen (2000). "Forgotten Campaign: The Dutch East Indies Campaign 1941–1942".
- McEvedy, Colin (1988). The Penguin Historical Atlas of the North America. Viking.
- McEvedy, Colin (1998). The Penguin Historical Atlas of the Pacific. Penguin.
- Morison, Samuel Eliot (2001). History of United States Naval Operations in World War II: The Battle of the Atlantic, September 1939 – May 1943 (illus., repr. ed.). University of Illinois Press. ISBN 978-0-252-06963-5.
- Ostler, Nicholas (2005). Empires of the Word: A Language History of the World. Harper Collins.
- Rogozinski, Jan (2000). A Brief History of the Caribbean. Plume.
- SarDesai, D.R. (1997). Southeast Asia: Past and Present. Westview. ISBN 9780813333014.
- Scammel, G.V. (1989). The First Imperial Age: European Overseas Expansion c. 1400–1715. Routledge.
- Sneddon, James (2003). The Indonesian Language: Its History and Role in Modern Society. UNSW Press.
- Shipp, Steve (1997). Macau, China: A Political History of the Portuguese Colony's Transition to Chinese Rule. McFarland.
- Taylor, Alan (2001). American Colonies: The Settling of North America. Penguin. ISBN 9780142002100.
- Vickers, Adrian (2005). A History of Modern Indonesia. Cambridge University Press. ISBN 0-521-54262-6.
