= List of Dutch East India Company trading posts and settlements =

The following were trading posts owned by the Dutch East India Company, presented in geographical sequence from west to east:

== Africa ==
=== Saint Helena ===
- Saint Helena

=== South Africa ===
- Cape of Good Hope (Cape Colony): 1652–1806

=== Mozambique ===
- Delagoa Bay: Fort Lydsaamheid (Jan. 1721 – 23 December 1730)

=== Madagascar ===
- Antongil Bay: 1641/2 factory – 1646/7

=== Mauritius ===
Mauritius (1638–1658 / 1664–1710)

== Middle East ==
=== Yemen ===
- Al Mukha (Mocca) (1620–16../1697–1757)
- Aden (1614–1620)
- Al-Shihr (1616)

=== Oman ===
- Muscat (1672–1675)

=== Iraq ===
- Basra (1645–1646, 1651, 1723–1752)

=== Persia (Iran) ===
- Esfahan (Ispahan) (1623–1747)
- Bandar-e Abbas (Gamron) (1623–1766)
- Kharg, Fort Mosselstein (1750–1766)
- Bandar-e Kong (1665–1753)
- Bushehr (Bushire) (1737–1753)
- Qeshm (Kismus) (1684–?)
- Shiraz (?–1730)

== South Asia ==
=== Bangladesh ===
- Dhaka
- Dutch settlement in Rajshahi
- Sherpur

=== India ===
==== Konkan (northern part of western coast of India) ====
- Surat (1616–1795)
- Agra (1621–1720)
- Burhanpur
- Kanpur (1650–1685)
- Ahmadabad (1617–1744)
- Bharuch (of Brochia, Broach)
- Vengurla (1637–1685)
- Kundapura (1667 – c. 1682)

==== Malabar (southern part of western coast of India) ====
- Veeramala Hills, Cheruvathur (c. 1701 – ?)
- Cannanore (1663–1790) (taken from Portugal)
- Ponnani (c. 1663)
- Cranganore or Cranganor (Kodungallor) (1662) (taken from Portugal)
- Cochin de Cima (Pallippuram, Ernakulam) (1661) (taken from Portugal)
- Cochin, Cochin de Baixo or Santa Cruz (1663) (taken from Portugal)
- Purakkad (ca. 1680–1750)
- Kayamkulam (c. 1645)
- Quilon (Kollam) (1661) (taken from Portugal)

==== Coromandel (eastern coast of India) ====
- Golkonda (1662 – c. 1733)
- Bimilipatnam (1687–1795 / 1818–1825) to the English; now Bheemunipatnam
- Jaggernaikpoeram (1734–1795 / 1818–1825) to the English; now Kakinada
- Daatzeram (1633–1730); now Draksharamam
- Nagelwanze (1669–1687); now Nagulavancha
- Palikol (1613–1781 / 1785–1795 / 1818–1825) to the English; now Palakol, Palakollu, or Palacole.
- Masulipatnam (1605–1756)
- Petapoeli (1606–1668); now Nizampatnam
- Paliacatta (1610–1781 / 1785–1795 / 1805–1825) to the English; now Pulicat
- Sadras (1654–1757 / 1785–1795), conquered by the British 1818
- Tierepopelier (1608–1625); now Thirupathiripuliyur or Tirupapuliyur
- Tegenapatnam, Kudalur (1608–1758); now Cuddalore
- Porto Novo (1608–1825 [1 June]) to the English; now Parangipettai
- Negapatnam (1658–1781) to the English.
- Tuticorin or Tutucorim (1658); now Thoothukudi
- Travancore

==== Bengal ====
- Pipeli (1627–1635)
- Baleshwar (1675–?)
- Patna
- Chhapra
- Cossimbazar
- Malda
- Mirzapore
- Murshidabad (1710–1759)
- Rajmahal
- Chinsura

=== Sri Lanka ===
- Dutch Ceylon

== Far East ==
=== Burma ===
- Siriangh or Syriam (1634–1679); now Thanlyin
- Ava (1634–1679)
- Pegu (1634–?), still in use in 1677
- Prome (1634–1655)

=== Arakan ===
- Mrohaung (1610–1665)

=== Martaban ===
- Martaban (1660–?), lasted only for a few years; now Mottama

=== Thailand (Siam) ===
- Ayutthaya, main quarter, 1613–1767
- Patani (Pattani), trading house, 1602–1623
- Sangora (Songkhla), trading house, 1607–1623
- Ligor (Ligoor, now Nakhon Si Thammarat), trading house, c. 1640 – 1756

=== Malaysia ===
- Malacca (1641–1824)

=== Dutch East Indies (Indonesia) ===
==== Governments (Gouvernementen) ====
- Ambon
- Banda Islands
- Batavia
- Java's Northeast Coast
- Makassar
- Moluccas

==== Commandments (Commandementen) ====
- Bantam
- Sumatra's West Coast

==== Residencies (Residenten) ====
- Bandjarmasin
- Cheribon
- Palembang
- Pontianak

==== Areas under a Opperhoofd ====
- Timor

=== Vietnam (Tonkin) ===
- Thǎng Long, (comptoir; 1636–1699)
- Hội An (comptoir; 1636–1641)

=== Taiwan ===
- Anping (Fort Zeelandia)
- Tainan (Fort Provincia)
- Wang-an, Penghu, Pescadores Islands (Fort Vlissingen; 1620–1624)
- Keelung (Fort Noord-Holland, Fort Victoria)
- Tamsui (Fort Antonio)

=== China ===
- Amoy (Xiamen)
- Kanton (Canton, Guangzhou) (1749–1803)
- Hoksieu (Fuzhou) (after 1662)

=== Japan ===
- Hirado (1609–1641)
- Deshima (1641–1858)

== See also ==
- Dutch Empire
- Evolution of the Dutch Empire
- List of Dutch West India Company trading posts and settlements
