= Veeramala Hills =

Mountain in India

Veeramala Hills is a small mountain in the Kasargode district of Kerala state, south India. It is situated at Cheruvathur. On the Hill top are the ruins of a Dutch fort built in the 18th century. There is a picnic spot from where the Kariangode river and surroundings can be viewed.
