= South African Korfball Federation =

Governing body of korfball in South Africa

- Sport: Korfball
- Jurisdiction: South Africa
- Abbreviation: SAKF
- Affiliation: International Korfball Federation
- Affiliation date: 1993
- Regional affiliation: African Continental Korfball Federation (ACKF)
- Location: Queenswood, 0121, Pretoria, Gauteng
- President: Les Williams
- Secretary: Chris Theyse
- (South Africa)

South African Korfball Federation (SAKF) is the governing body for the sport of Korfball in South Africa. The national body has 10 regional member associations in its organisation structure. It is affiliated with the world governing body International Korfball Federation. SAKF organises men's and women's competitions annually amongst its regional members across age groups. The men's national team have won three All-Africa Korfball Championship and participated at the IKF World Korfball Championship.

== Regional members ==
This is a list of SAKF regional member associations in its governance structure, below them are the Korfball clubs.

- Gauteng East
- Gauteng North
- Sedibeng
- Mpumalanga South
- Stellaland
- Northern Cape
- Southern Cape
- Kwa-Zulu Natal
- Northern Kwa-Zulu Natal
- Eastern Cape

== See also ==
South Africa national korfball team
