= Zwanze =

Type of folk humour from Brussels, Belgium

Zwanze (French) or zwans (Dutch) is a form of folk humour typical of Brussels, Belgium, characterised by sarcastic, ironic, and self-deprecating banter or jesting. Rooted in the city's working-class culture and oral tradition, zwanze often involves exaggerated storytelling, practical jokes and expressions, and a deliberate subversion of seriousness. It is marked by self-mockery, scepticism towards authority, and a fondness for the surreal. By extension, the term refers to a Brussels' way of life.

Zwanze forms part of Brussels' popular heritage, along with its local dialects, and is considered representative of the city's identity. It also reflects a broader cultural attitude associated with Belgium, known as belgitude (French; lit. 'Belgianness'). Since 2021, it has been listed as intangible cultural heritage of the Brussels-Capital Region.

== Etymology ==
The word zwans derives from the German Schwanz (lit. 'tail'), also used to denote the male genitalia. The French zwanze is a francisation of the Flemish Brusselian zwans. Referring to genitals when speaking of jokes or foolishness is a common phenomenon, as seen in French couillonnades or Flemish Brusselian klûteraa.

== Characteristics ==
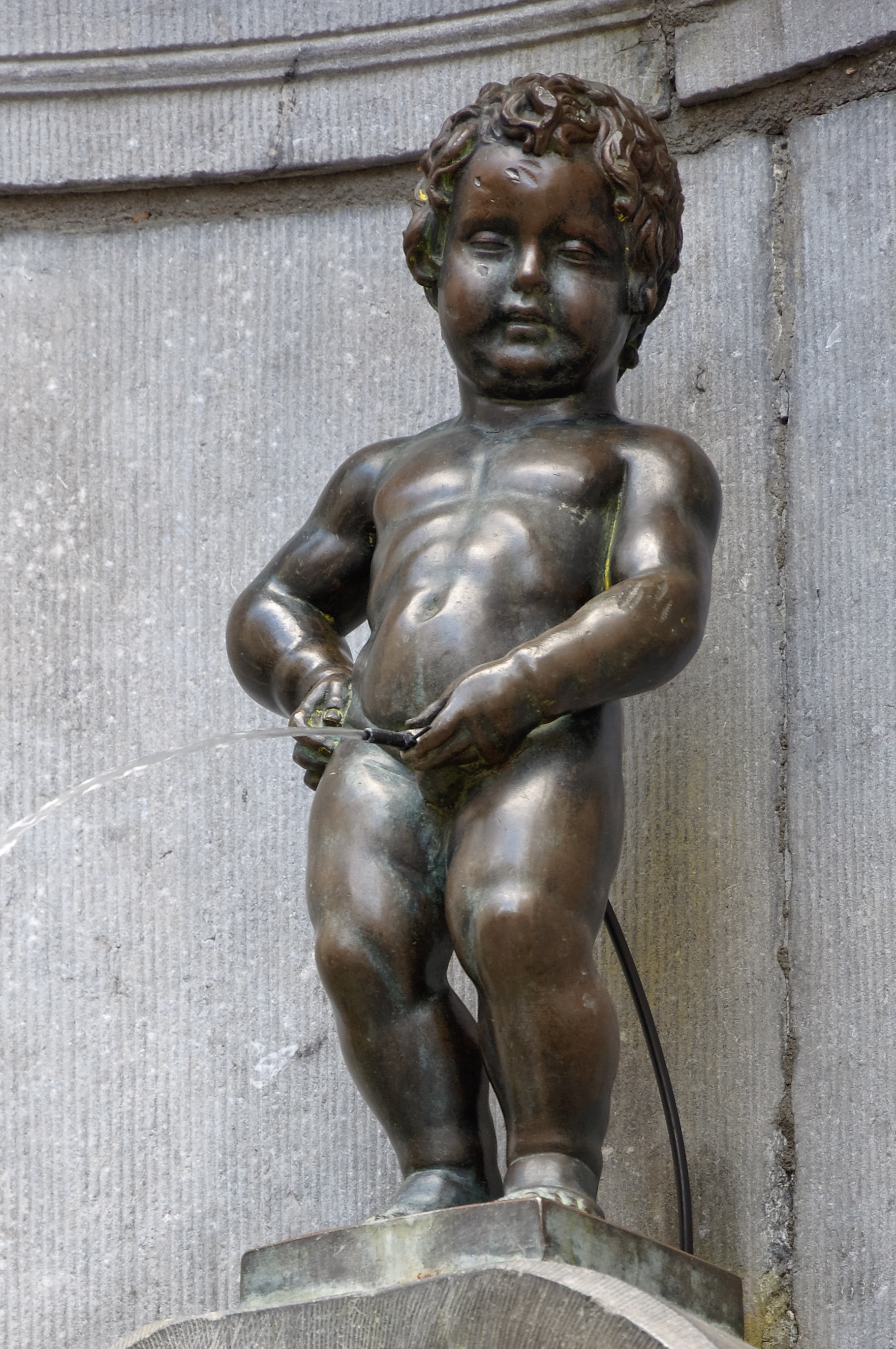
The statue of Manneken Pis is an example of zwanze.

In the 19th century and until the Second World War, zwanze was primarily a farce, an exaggeration, or a mystification. A zwanzeur (practitioner) would ridicule their audience with solemn seriousness, yet was the last person entitled to laugh at their own jokes. It combined exaggeration with absurd linguistic reconstructions, often blending Flemish dialects and French, and involved self-mockery, summed up in the saying: "Blessed are those who can laugh at themselves, for they will never be laughed out".

Zwanze is a mischievous, Rabelaisian form of humour that is inseparable from Brussels' popular heritage and local dialects. It is primarily oral and spontaneous, appearing in private conversations, market cries, disputes, or casual exchanges, and requires at least a passive knowledge of a Brusselian dialect to fully appreciate. Examples include "manne pa zaaine auto!" (lit. 'my father's car!') or "ei eit moote ne devis moêke!" ("lit. 'he had to ask for a quote!'"). Zwanze also occurs in street exchanges, as when a woman shouts "occupe-toi de tes casseroles!" (lit. 'mind your own business!') to passersby and receives a comic response in dialect.

In cultural life, zwanze is also expressed in literature, pseudo-historical essays, fables, theatre, comics, songs, sketches, and parodies. Fables offer opportunities to parody well-known authors by placing their words in contemporary contexts. While Jean de La Fontaine mocked the nobility and bourgeoisie of his time, zwanze targets political leaders and everyday events. It has also been adapted into musical parody, such as a comedic version of Bizet's Carmen aria "Habanera". This combination of wordplay, local accent, and cultural reference, has made zwanze a distinctive Brussels' way of life and, according to some, even a civic virtue.

== Origins and development ==
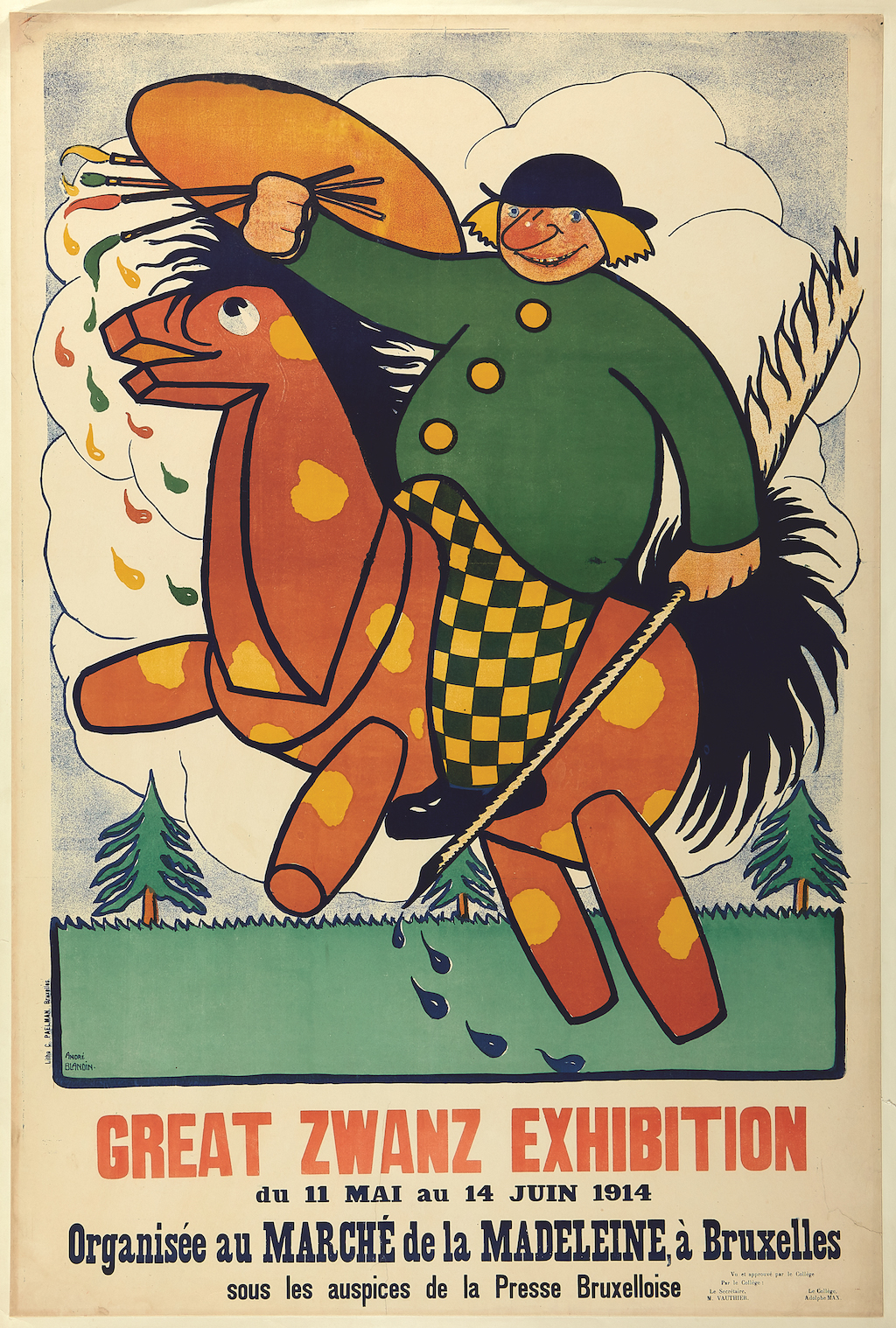
Poster of the 1914 Great Zwanz Exhibition

The precise origins of zwanze are difficult to determine, much like exaggeration in Marseille. One of the earliest known references is a farce from 1695, written just days after the city was bombarded by Marshal de Villeroy's troops in the service of King Louis XIV. This piece, T' Mantien-Pis Claeghende om dat het door de Fransche Bombarderinge met eenen ongelukkiggen Letter-wissel ofte Anagarama geworden is Man-Pist-Niet, depicts Manneken Pis losing his "natural function" from fright, reflecting the psychosomatic impact of the bombardment. While this text is among the oldest attestations of zwanze, it does not imply that the tradition originated there.

In the 19th century, zwanze increasingly appeared in literature, fables, and popular theatre. French-speaking authors were particularly active, often borrowing expressions from Flemish Brusselian, including Barès, Bazoef (Léopold Pels), Curtio, and Jacques Collin de Plancy. Dutch-speaking authors also contributed, such as Cypriaan Verhavert, and the traditional puppet theatre Toone, founded around 1830 in the Marolles/Marollen, often showcasing zwanze through parodies of plays, opera, and classical literature. Literary and social associations like the Société des Joyeux and the Société des Agathopèdes promoted colourful, humorous performances, with members including notable figures such as Alphonse Balat, Charles De Coster, Alexandre Dumas, and Michel de Ghelderode.

Large-scale zwanze events emerged during the Belle Époque, including the "Great Zwanz Exhibition" of 1885, 1897, and 1914, presenting works that prefigured abstract art, Dadaism, and Surrealism. Early in the 20th century, the play Le Mariage de mademoiselle Beulemans helped zwanze spread beyond Belgium, influencing writers like Marcel Pagnol. Throughout the 20th century, the Marollen remained a central stage for the tradition, from post-war public festivities parodying Kaiser Wilhelm II and Hitler, to the 1943 Faux Soir resistance publication. Zwanze also permeated popular culture through boulevard theatre, football rivalries, and annual events such as the "Zwanze Derby".

In the 21st century, zwanze continues to be celebrated in public gatherings and literary creation, preserving its role as a living facet of Brussels' cultural life. It is considered as representative of Brussels' identity as Manneken Pis, the Grand-Place/Grote Markt, or the city's frietkot culture. In 2021, it was included in the inventory of intangible cultural heritage of the Brussels-Capital Region.

== Cultural presence ==
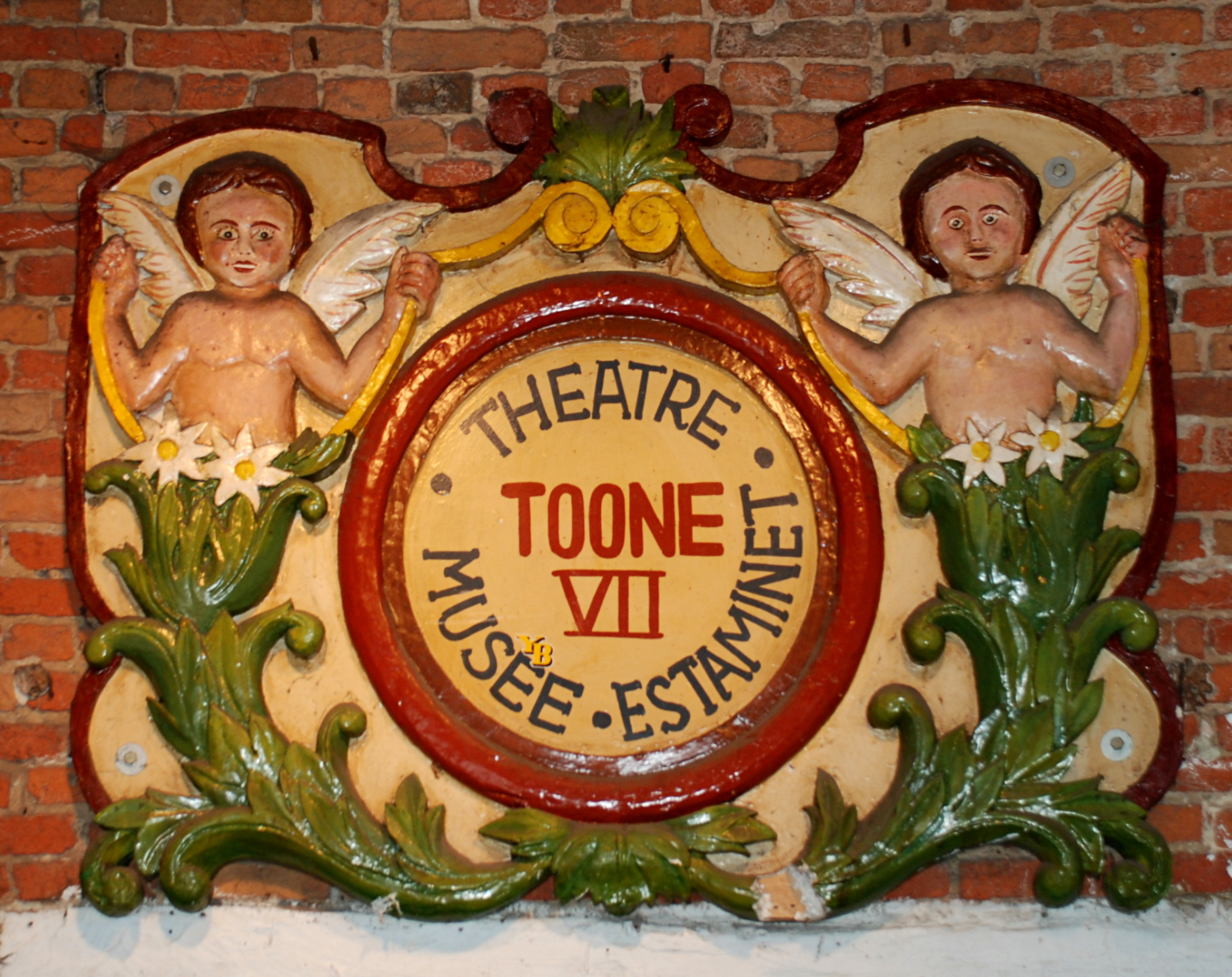
Sign of Toone VII

Beyond daily life, zwanze plays a recognised role in Brussels' cultural scene, appearing in parades, festivals, literature, and the visual arts. Cafés, café-théâtres, and cultural associations help maintain the tradition through local events and major festivities such as the Meyboom and Folklorissimo. Zwanze transcends social class: working-class audiences often favour mischievous humour, while more educated circles tend to appreciate wordplay.

Theatrical works in Brussels' dialect, such as Le Mariage de mademoiselle Beulemans and Bossemans et Coppenolle, remain popular, attracting both French- and Dutch-speaking audiences across generations. Figures frequently cited as ambassadors of the tradition include Jacques Brel, Félicien Rops, Madame Chapeau, Les Moustaches, and the Royal Theatre Toone. The form and prominence of zwanze can also vary depending on the cultural backgrounds of immigrant communities in the city.

== Legacy and recognition ==
The phenomenon of zwanze is intrinsically linked to Brussels, but its influence extends beyond the Brussels-Capital Region. The Brussels word zwanze has been recorded in major lexicographical sources, including Larousse, Le Petit Robert, the Base de données lexicographiques panfrancophone (BDLP) at Laval University in Québec, and the Trésor de la Langue Française informatisé (TLFi) of the CNRS/Université de Lorraine. Books on zwanze are published throughout Belgium and are sometimes available abroad.

Zwanze has been studied at universities both in Belgium and internationally. Examples include a 1993 literary study on onomastics, geography, and adventure entitled Zwanze et science à la conquête de l'empire: Nirep et les mystères du Congo (UCL) and a 2020 interuniversity competition in international public law focused on a simulated case regarding the restitution of cultural and archaeological works in the context of zwanze (Procès simulé en droit international public, UCL). The Charte pour la Zwanze et les Parlers bruxellois (lit. 'Charter for Zwanze and the Brusselian Dialects') was created to encourage further research into zwanze and its linguistic heritage, emphasising its status as an intangible cultural expression.

== See also ==
- History of Brussels
- Culture of Belgium
