= Flemish Brusselian dialect =

Traditional dialect spoken in Brussels, Belgium

Flemish Brusselian
- Bruxellois flamand (French); Brussels Vlaams (Dutch)
- Native to: Belgium, specifically Brussels
- Language family: Indo-European: Germanic; West Germanic; Weser–Rhine Germanic; Low Franconian; Dutch; Brabantian; South Brabantian; Flemish Brusselian
- Writing system: Latin script

Official status
- Recognised minority language in: Brussels-Capital Region
- Regulated by: Brusseleir!

Language codes
- ISO 639-3: None (mis)
- Glottolog: brus1234 Brusseleir
- Linguasphere: 52-ACB-ai
- IETF: nl-u-sd-bebru
- Location within Brussels
- Coordinates: 50°50′48.05″N 4°21′9″E

Flemish Brusselian (French: Bruxellois flamand; Dutch: Brussels Vlaams), also known as Brussels Flemish (Note: Not to be confused with the colloquial Dutch/Flemish spoken in Brussels) or Brussels Vloms (Brabantian variant of vlaams; "Flemish"), is a traditional dialect native to Brussels, Belgium, a distinct variety of Brusselian. It is a heavily-Francisised Brabantian Dutch dialect that incorporates a sprinkle of Spanish loanwords dating back to the rule of the Low Countries by the Habsburgs (1519–1713). It is distinct from written standard Dutch in vocabulary, grammar, and pronunciation.

== History ==
=== Development ===
The Flemish Brusselian dialect developed from a Brabantian dialect spoken by the first inhabitants, located north of the Romance–Germanic language border. From the city's early history, two languages coexisted: the local Brabantian dialect and French, initially the language of the nobility and later increasingly of the bourgeoisie. Over time, French gained prominence, especially during the Burgundian, Spanish, and Austrian periods, and became the dominant prestige language. After the French annexation of the Southern Netherlands, Dutch largely lost official status and survived mainly in local dialects. Attempts to restore Dutch under the United Kingdom of the Netherlands and after Belgian independence in 1830 met with limited success, and Brussels gradually diverged from other Flemish cities, with French usage steadily rising.

During the 19th and much of the 20th centuries, there was little interest in the Dutch dialect spoken in Brussels, as the city lacked a Dutch-speaking intelligentsia. Some official support emerged only gradually with the federalisation of Belgium, which gave the Dutch-speaking community authority over cultural matters, including language. The only major early study was G. Mazereel's Klank- en Vormleer van het Brusselsch dialect, published in 1931 by the Koninklijke Vlaamse Academie voor Taal- en Letterkunde. Mazereel began studying Brusselian in 1917 and initially focused on the dialect of Ixelles. While detailed, his work was of lower quality than contemporary studies on other Brabantian dialects.

Other early contributors included Louis Quievreux, author of a Dictionnaire du dialecte bruxellois, which reached a fifth edition in 1985 with grammar and spelling notes. Authors such as Léopold Courouble, Maurice Lefèvre, Leopold Pels, Adelin d'Agne, and Georges Garnir documented Brussels' speech and types, with Garnir publishing Baedeker de physiologie bruxelloise before 1914. Jean d'Osta later described Brussels' dialect and social types in newspapers and contributed a grammar and spelling appendix to Quievreux's dictionary. A French-language association, the Académie pour la Défense et l'Illustration du Parler Bruxellois, published a French–Marollian bilingual word list with support from the Brussels-Capital Region.

=== Preservation and promotion ===
To preserve and promote the dialect, the Academie van het Brussels was founded on 17 April 1991. It studies and documents Flemish Brusselian, publishes the quarterly journal Brussels dialect, established a standard spelling in 1997, and issued key works including Mazereel's studies and the Grammatica van het Brussels (2003). The academy supports audio recordings, theatre performances, literary competitions, and local initiatives such as the Creatief Complot zonner Complexe cabaret group and street name signage in the local dialect. It collaborates with other Brabant dialect organisations and contributed to the 1999 reference spelling for all Brabantian dialects. Local branches such as De Speegelmanne and De Orde van de Bloempanch further promote community engagement, performances, and education in Flemish Brusselian.

From 2002 onwards, the academy expanded into theatre through the Brussels Volkstejoêter, presenting classic and contemporary works in Flemish Brusselian. Their first production, Bossemans en Coppenolle, a parody of the 1930s bourgeois milieu, attracted over 7,000 viewers. In January 2003, De Traafiest van Mademoiselle Beulemans, a Brussels comedy originally performed in 1910, ran for thirty-eight shows with more than 13,000 attendees, praised for its faithful representation of the dialect and character. A subsequent production, Dineire me Peire (a Brussels adaptation of Francis Veber's Le Dîner de Cons), marked a shift towards contemporary repertoire, situating non-Brussels works within a fully Brussels context.

In 2013, the Academie van het Brussels, the Brussels Volkstejoêter, and the dialect support centre Ara! merged to become be.brusseleir. The previous organisations were dissolved, with the unification encouraged by the Flemish Community Commission (VGC) to improve transparency, coordinate strengths, and provide greater support for Flemish Brusselian heritage. In February 2021, be.brusseleir changed its name to Brusseleir!. On 15 December 2021, Flemish Brusselian was added to the inventory of intangible cultural heritage of the Brussels-Capital Region together with Beulemans, Marollian and Bergades.

== Examples ==
An example of Flemish Brusselian is:

Na mooie ni paaze da'k ee da poèzeke em zitte deklameire
Allien mo vè aile t'amuzeire
Neineie... ik em aile wille demonstreire
Dat as er zain dee uile me konviksen e stuk in uilen uur drinke.
Dat da ni seulement en allien es vè te drinke.

Nu moet je niet denken dat ik hier dat gedichtje heb zitten voordragen
Alleen maar om jullie te vermaken
Neenee… ik heb jullie willen tonen
Dat er [mensen] zijn die met overtuiging een stuk in hun kraag drinken.
Dat dat niet louter en alleen is om te drinken.

— In standard Dutch

== In The Adventures of Tintin ==
The coat-of-arms of Syldavia features a motto in Syldavian, which is based on Brusselian and reads Eih bennek, eih blavek, in English: ("Here I am, here I stay").

For the popular comic series The Adventures of Tintin, the Brussels author Hergé modelled his fictional languages Syldavian and Bordurian on Flemish Brusselian, and modelled many other personal and place-names in his works on the dialect (e.g. the city of Khemkhâh in the fictional Middle Eastern country of Khemed comes from the Brusselian phrase for "I'm cold"). Bordurian, for example, has as one of its words the Flemish Brusselian-based mänhir meaning "mister" (cf. Dutch mijnheer). In the original French, the fictional Arumbaya language of San Theodoros is another incarnation of Flemish Brusselian.
