= Meyboom =

Oldest tradition in Brussels, Belgium

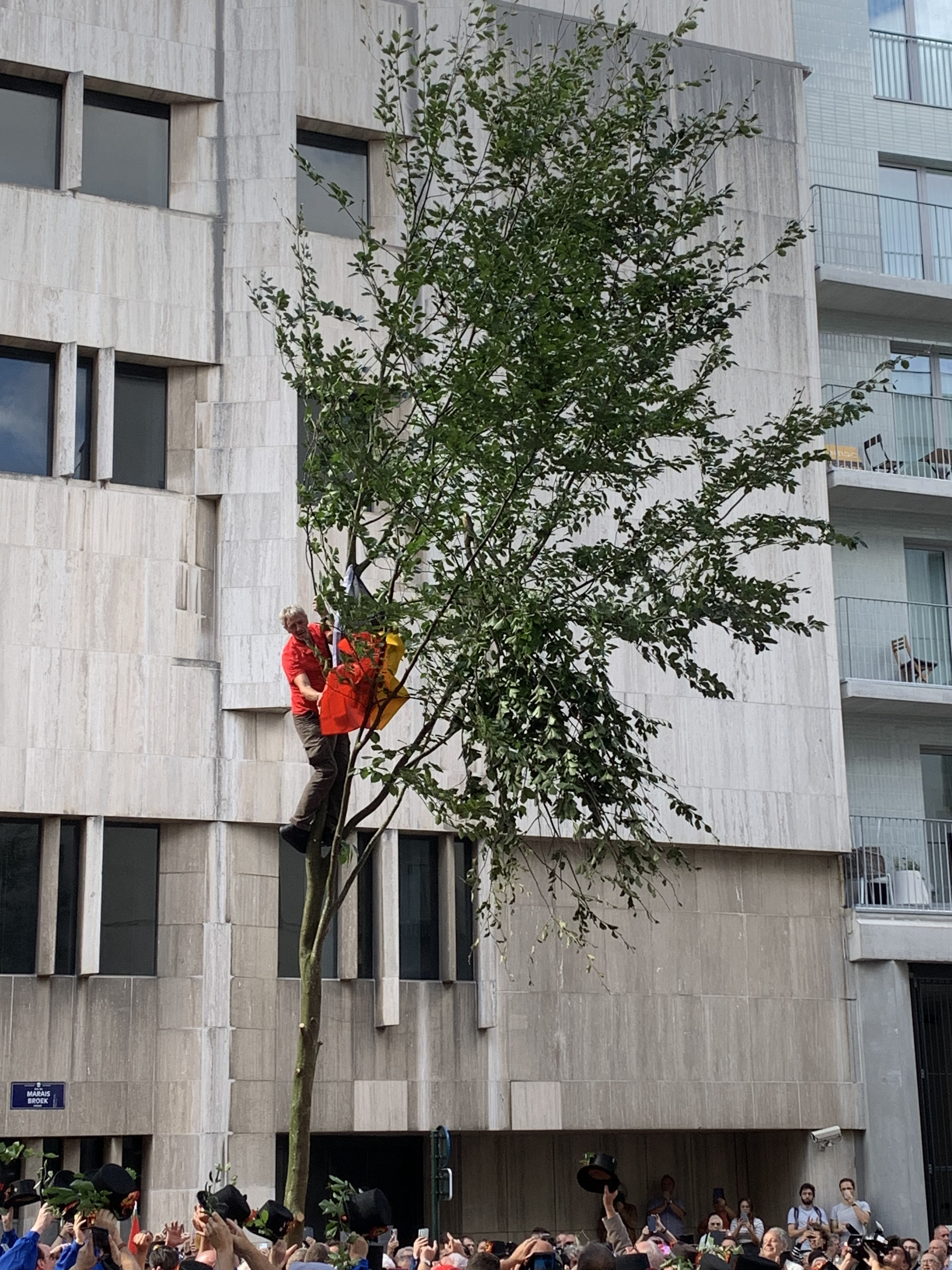
- The planting of the Meyboom in Brussels
- Status: Active
- Frequency: Annual
- Locations: City of Brussels, Brussels-Capital Region; Leuven, Flemish Brabant
- Country: Belgium
- Inaugurated: c. 1308
- Most recent: 9 August 2026
- Next event: 9 August 2027
- Website: www.meyboom.be

Processional giants and dragons in Belgium and France
- UNESCO Intangible Cultural Heritage
- Country: Belgium
- Reference: 00153
- Region: Europe and North America

Inscription history
- Inscription: 2008 (3rd session)
- List: Representative

The Meyboom (French, former Dutch spelling) or Meiboom (modern Dutch) (Note: Brusselian: Maâbuum. Although sometimes translated as "May tree" in English, the name is a corruption of the Dutch word, meaning tree of joy.) plantation is the oldest tradition in Brussels, Belgium, attested since 1308. It is held every year on 9 August, the eve of St Lawrence's Day, and consists mainly in the planting of a beech at the intersection of the Rue des Sables/Zandstraat and the Rue du Marais/Broekstraat in the City of Brussels' Marais–Jacqmain district. (Note: This area was historically known as the "Bas-Fonds", a working-class neighbourhood of Brussels' lower town.)

The event has several phases, with some parts of the ceremony being open to the public, and others reserved for tradition bearers. It is organised by the Companions of St Lawrence, a city association, and is accompanied by processions and various folk activities during the day. The celebration is reminiscent of Brussels' long-standing (folkloric) feud with Leuven, which dates back to the Middle Ages. Following a friendly incident in 1974 in which the Meyboom was stolen and taken to Leuven, both cities have claimed to be planting the "real" Meyboom.

Since 2008, the Meyboom has been recognised as a Masterpiece of the Oral and Intangible Heritage of Humanity by UNESCO, and it is also listed as intangible heritage of the French Community of Belgium.

== History ==
=== Origins ===
The tradition goes back seven centuries, and according to the local folklore, commemorates a victory of Brussels over the nearby Flemish town of Leuven in 1213. That year, a brawl broke out between the two cities over taxation on beer. Indeed, at the beginning of the 13th century, the bourgeois of Brussels enjoyed frequenting guinguettes (i.e. small taverns) located outside the city walls, where the price of beer was not subject to city taxes. One afternoon, a gang of troublemakers from Leuven turned up in force and unexpectedly attacked one of these guinguettes, Het Cattenhuys, where a wedding was being celebrated. The Companions of St Lawrence, a city guild whose members were present in the establishment, came to the aid of Brussels' inhabitants and vigorously repelled the aggressor. Grateful, the Duke of Brabant at the time, Henri I of Brabant, granted the guild the status of corporation and gave it the right to plant henceforth a tree of joy or Meyboom, a symbol of youth and fertility. As a tribute to the new corporation, the plantation date was set to 9 August, the eve of St Lawrence's Day, the guild's patron saint. However, it was not until 1308, under John II, Duke of Brabant, that this privilege was exercised for the first time.

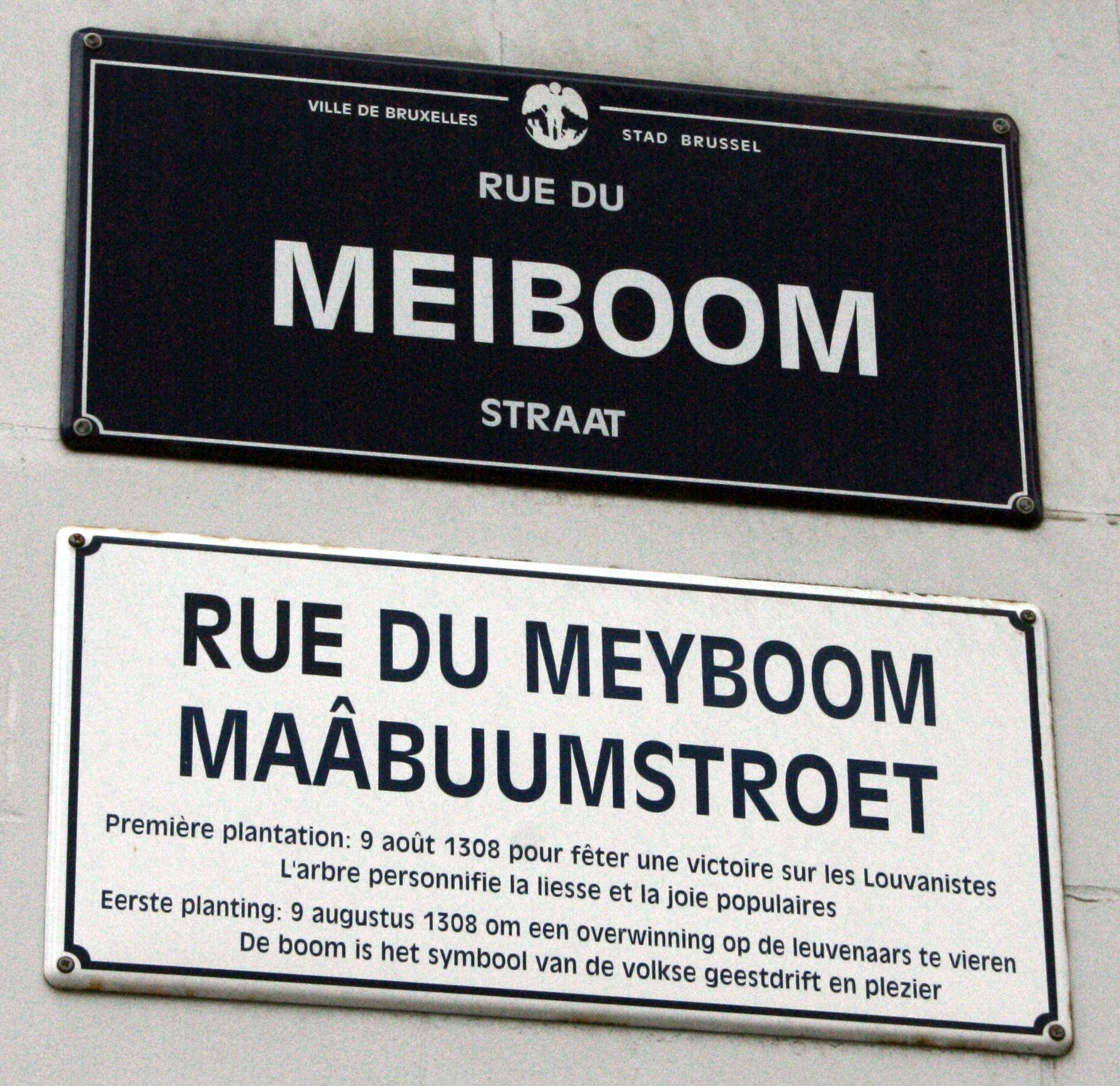
Wall plaque at the corner of the Rue des Sables and the Rue du Meyboom

This feat of arms has long puzzled historians, as there are no documents to corroborate the legend. Another version pits the people of Brussels against those of Ghent, and a third, mentioned by the French historian Adolphe Guérard, includes the people of Leuven, united with those of Brussels, in this fight. Variants also place the events in 1143 or 1308. The 1143 version refers to a marriage between a man from Leuven and a woman from Brussels, a relationship that ended abruptly. The year 1308 itself may have corresponded to another important event in the history of the city or duchy; for example, 1213 was the year of the second marriage of Duke Henry I to Marie of France, although this delay of almost 100 years remains unexplained. The first explicit mention of the Meyboom dates from 1579, when the Chamber of Accounts allowed the inhabitants of the district known as the "Bas-Fonds" (today's Marais–Jacqmain district) to fetch the tree from the Sonian Forest, on the outskirts of Brussels, and bring it back to the city for planting. The custom was once again reported in 1635 and 1648.

=== Later history ===
In spite of Brussels' tortuous history, including the 20th-century demolition of most of the Marais–Jacqmain district (see Brusselisation), the Meyboom tradition has been maintained throughout the centuries. There is, however, some doubt about it taking place in 1725. (Note: A bourgeois of Brussels reported in his account book that the Meyboom was not planted that year.) In 1831, with circumstances difficult and money scarce due to Belgium gaining its independence, the men of the neighbourhood were reluctant to continue organising the ceremony. Regardless, the local women took on the initiative and ensured the planting. The processions of 1839 and 1840 were particularly lavish. During the two world wars, the plantation still took place, although no procession was organised, with a few faithful guardians of the privilege planting either a shrub, a small bush, or even a simple plant, at the corner of the two streets.

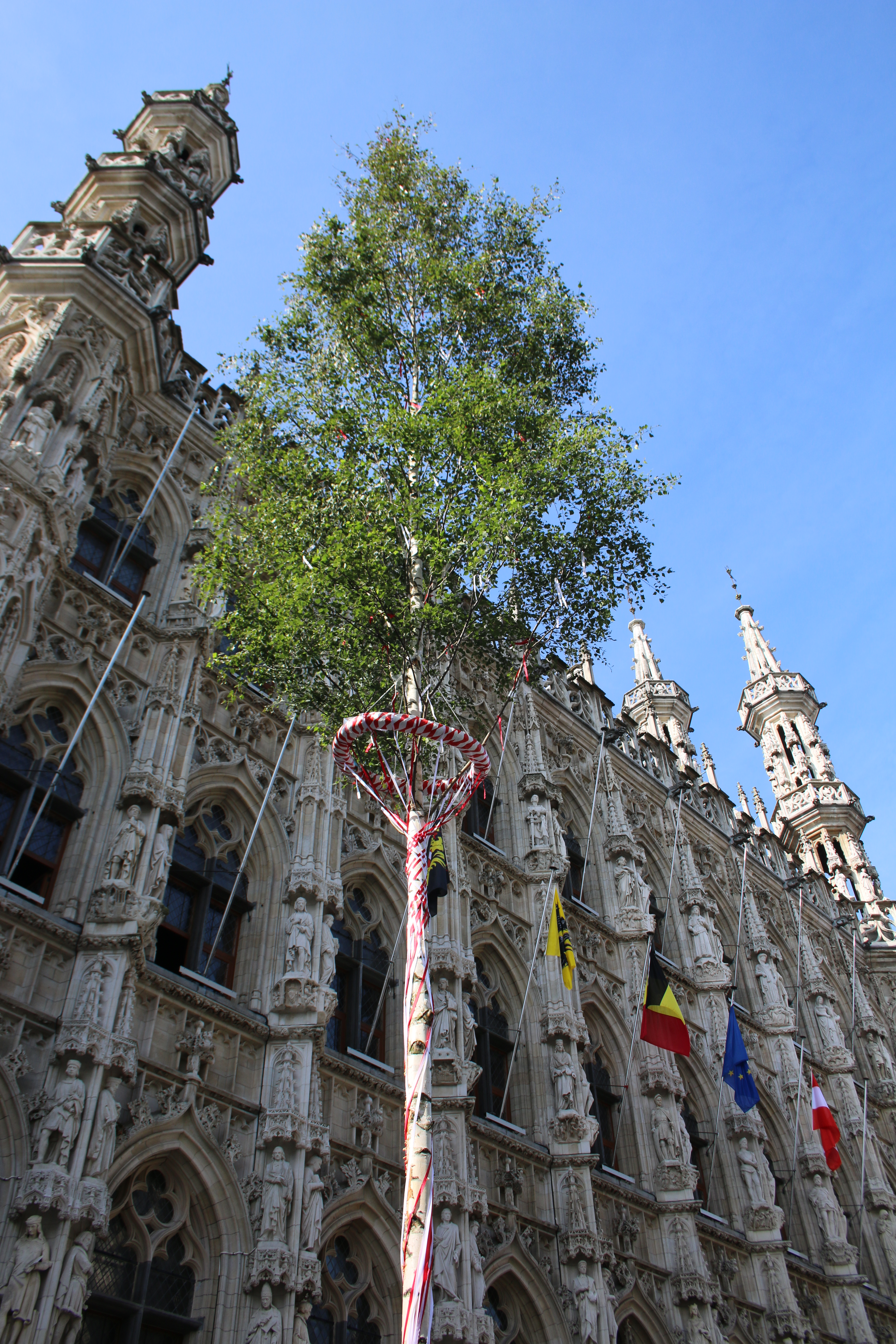
The Meyboom of Leuven

The first attempt by Leuven to steal the tree took place in 1939. That year, the people of Leuven, traditionally at odds with those of Brussels, organised the removal of the tree. Taking advantage of the fact that the latter were enjoying themselves in the taverns, they transported the precious load in another truck and disappeared. The Meyboom's organisers, furious and distraught, immediately contacted the police and the thieves were arrested at the entrance to Leuven. In the meantime, the citizens of Brussels had found another tree and hastily planted it to save their honour. Another incident happened in 1974, when a group of men from Leuven, called The Men of 1929, managed to find out which tree Brussels had earmarked as its Meyboom. On the night of 8 August, they cut down the tree and brought it to Leuven, where they erected it in front of the City Hall. Brussels chose to ignore what had happened and felled another tree. Ever since, the two cities have been involved in a friendly rivalry to decide who owns the "real" Meyboom.

In 2005, the Meyboom was recognised as intangible heritage of the French Community of Belgium, and in 2008, as one of the Masterpieces of the Oral and Intangible Heritage of Humanity by UNESCO, as part of the binational listing of 'Processional giants and dragons in Belgium and France'. In 2017, the Meyboom was included in the inventory of intangible cultural heritage of the Brussels-Capital Region.

== Celebrations ==
Throughout its history, the Meyboom has evolved considerably. In its current version, the tree is designated by the city's Plantation Department and "chosen" by the Companions of St Lawrence in the Bois de la Cambre/Ter Kamerenbos. According to tradition, it must weigh at least 600 kg (1,300 lb), measure 12–13 metres (39–43 ft) in height and be leafy. It is cut down at dawn, around 6 a.m., before being carried by Bûûmdroegers ("tree bearers") through the municipalities of Schaerbeek, Saint-Josse-ten-Noode and the City of Brussels—where most of the bearers reside following the demolition of the historic Bas-Fonds district—with several halts along the way. The procession is accompanied by a marching band, Poepedroegers ("giant puppet bearers"), the Wheel of Fortune, Kêrstoempers ("cart pushers"), Meybloemekes ("flower-handing women"), as well as Gardevils ("city guards") responsible for securing the procession since 2001. At 1 p.m., a tribute is paid to the deceased Companions, to the Bas-Fonds district, and to the "children" of the district who died for their country.

The procession then forms at the corner of the Rue du Marais/Broekstraat and the Rue des Comédiens/Komediantenstraat (near the Companions' premises, at 37, rue des Sables/Zandstraat), and sets off at 1.30 p.m. along a fixed route through the Rue du Fossé aux Loups/Wolvengracht, the Place de la Monnaie/Muntplein, the Rue des Fripiers/Kleerkopersstraat, the Rue de Tabora/Taborastraat, the Rue du Midi/Zuidstraat, the Rue du Lombard/Lombardstraat, the Rue de l'Étuve/Stoofstraat, and the Rue de l'Amigo/Vruntstraat, before arriving at the Grand-Place/Grote Markt (Brussels' main square) where the tree is presented to the city's authorities and the population around 2.00 p.m. At 2.45 p.m., the procession departs from the Grand-Place via the Rue Chair et Pain/Vlees-en-Broodstraat, the Rue du Marché aux Herbes/Grasmarkt, the Rue de la Fourche/Greepstraat, the Rue de l'Écuyer/Schildknaapsstraat, the Rue Montagne aux Herbes Potagères/Warmoesberg, and finally returns to the corner of the Rue des Comédiens and the Rue du Marais around 4.30 p.m. Along the way, small branches of the tree and flowers are distributed, supposed to bring good fortune for the year to come.

The culmination is the plantation itself, at the corner of the Rue des Sables and the Rue du Marais, to the encouragement of the crowd. It ends in apotheosis when a valiant Bûûmdroeger climbs the tree to attach the Belgian flag, accompanied by the brass band which begins playing a tune by André Grétry entitled Where can one be better than within his family (1769), followed by The Brabançonne (Belgium's national anthem). The planting must take place before 5 p.m. to avoid a victory for the "Louvanistes" (i.e. Leuven's inhabitants). The tree is not actually planted, but stuck in a purposely provided pit in the ground and removed the next day. If successful, the event is celebrated until dawn.

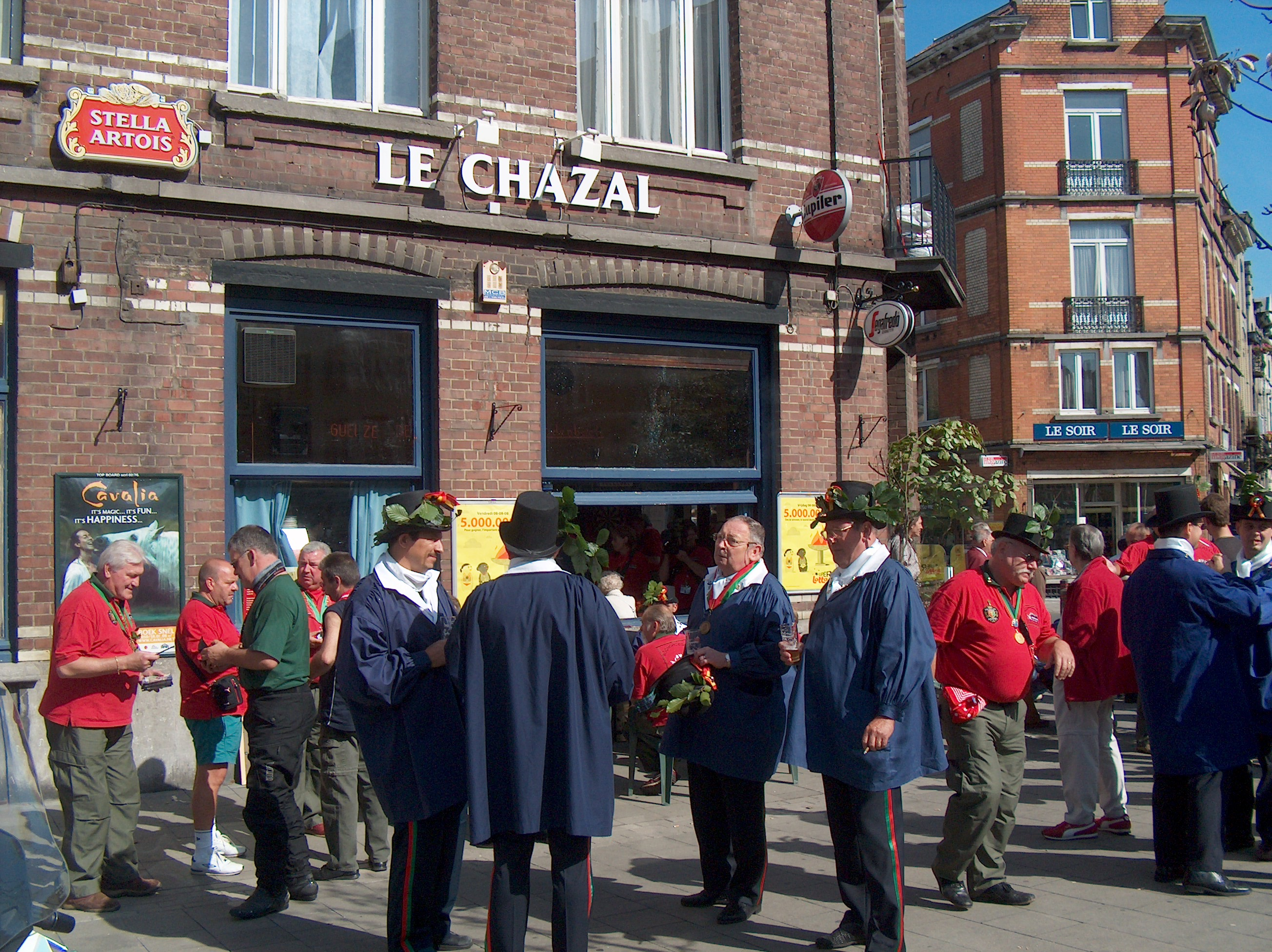
A halt in Schaerbeek for the procession of the Meyboom in 2008

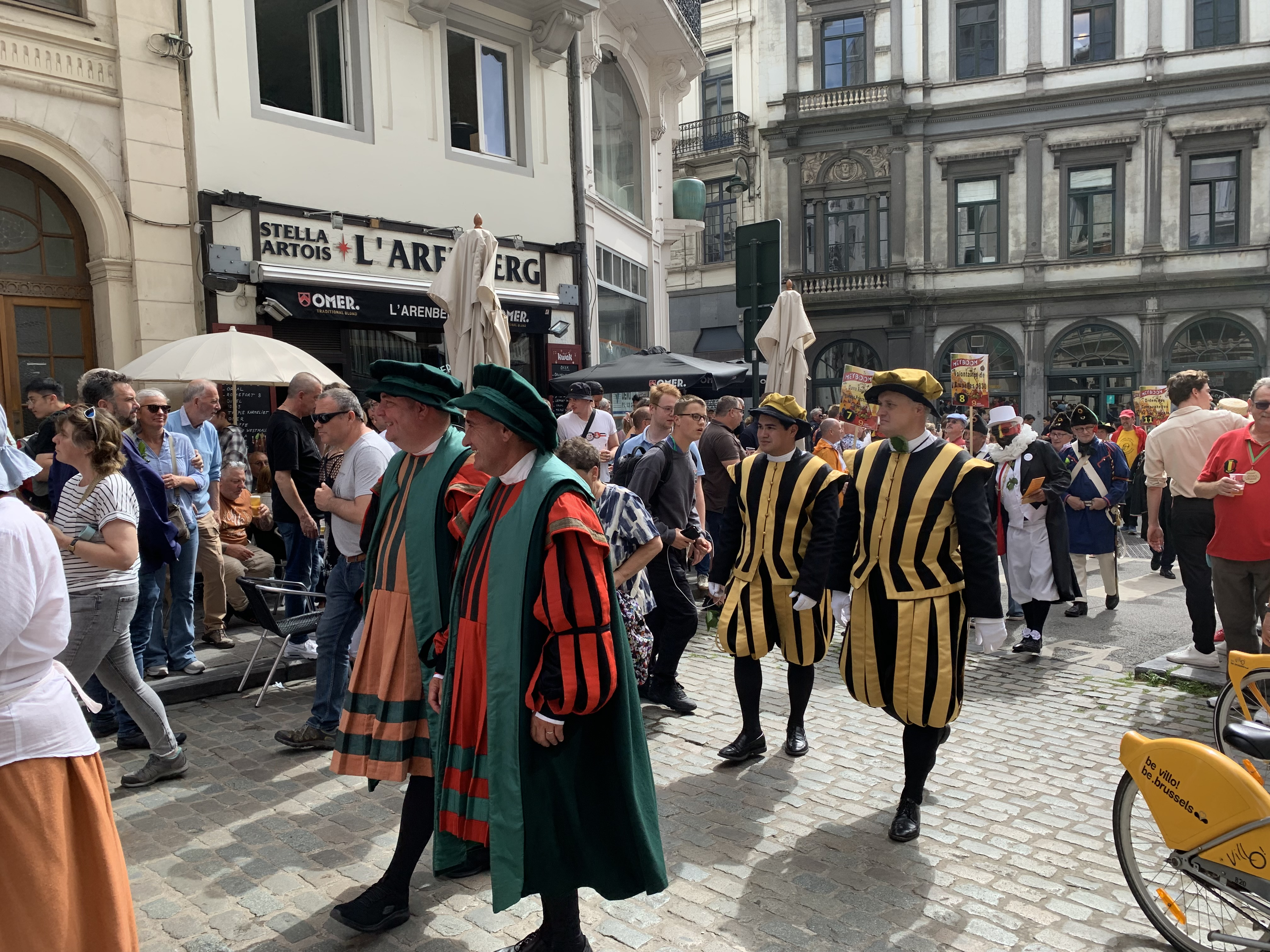
The procession of the Meyboom through the streets of Brussels

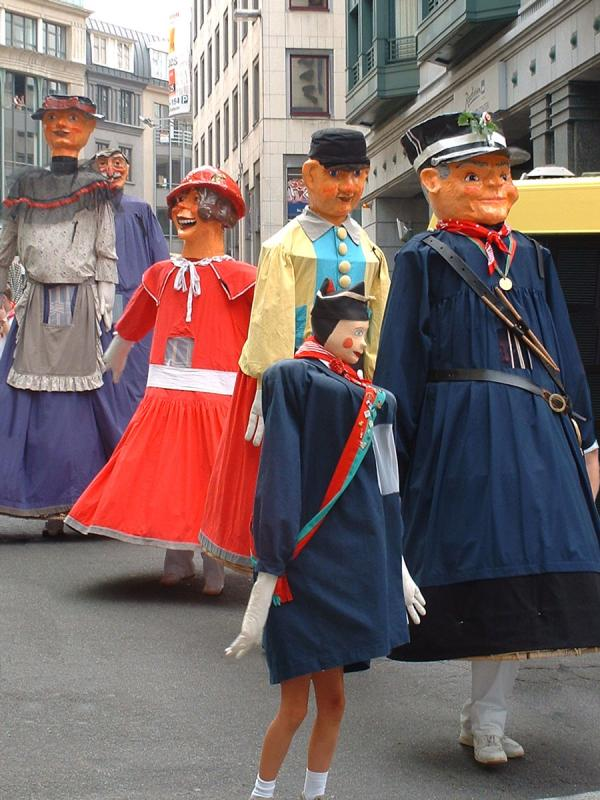
Processional giants of the Meyboom

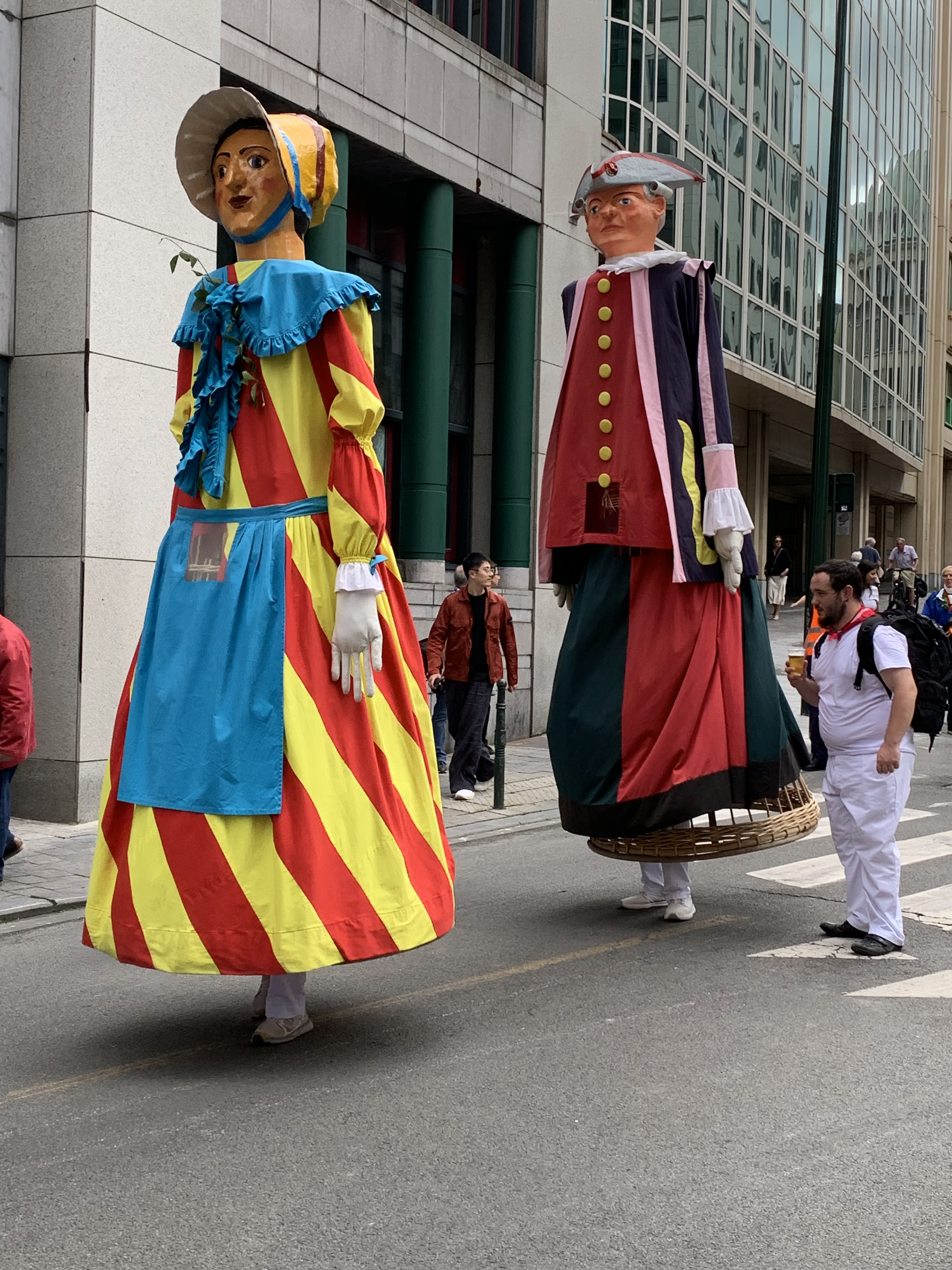
Processional giants of the Meyboom

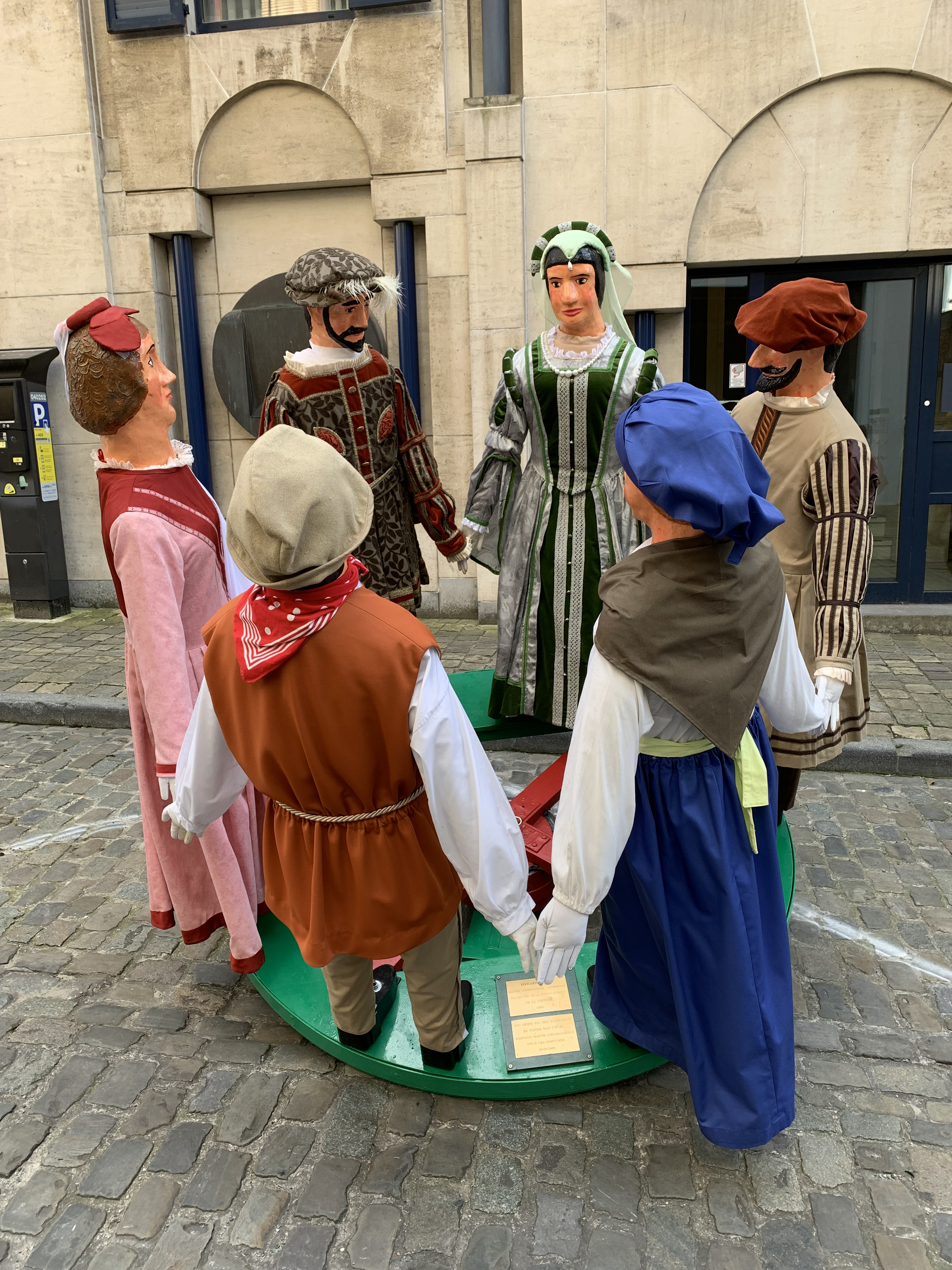
Wheel of Fortune

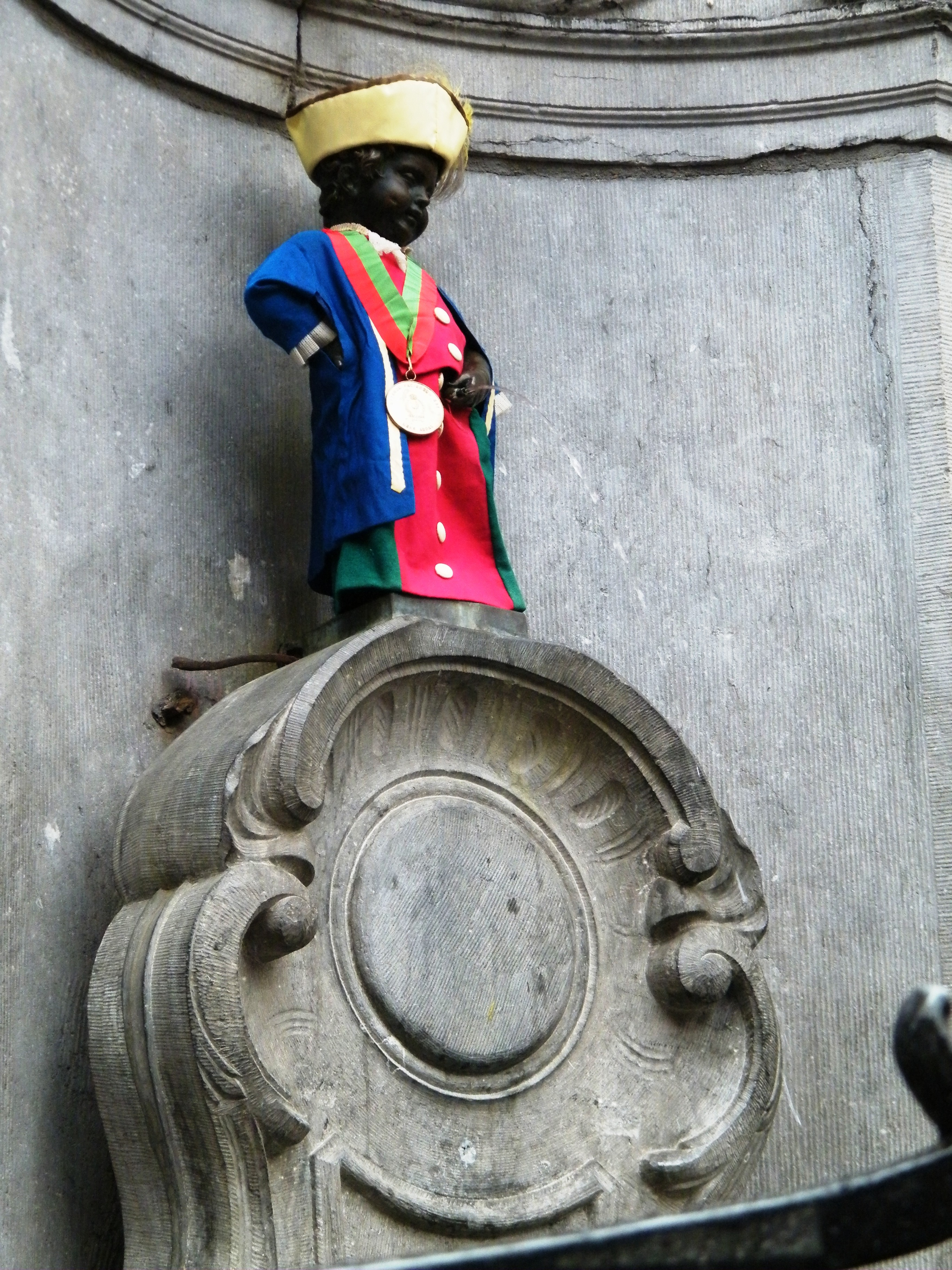
Manneken Pis during the Meyboom

== See also ==
- Ommegang of Brussels
- Royal Theatre Toone
- Saint-Verhaegen
- History of Brussels
- Culture of Belgium
