= Le Mariage de mademoiselle Beulemans =

Play by Frantz Fonson and Fernand Wicheler (1910)

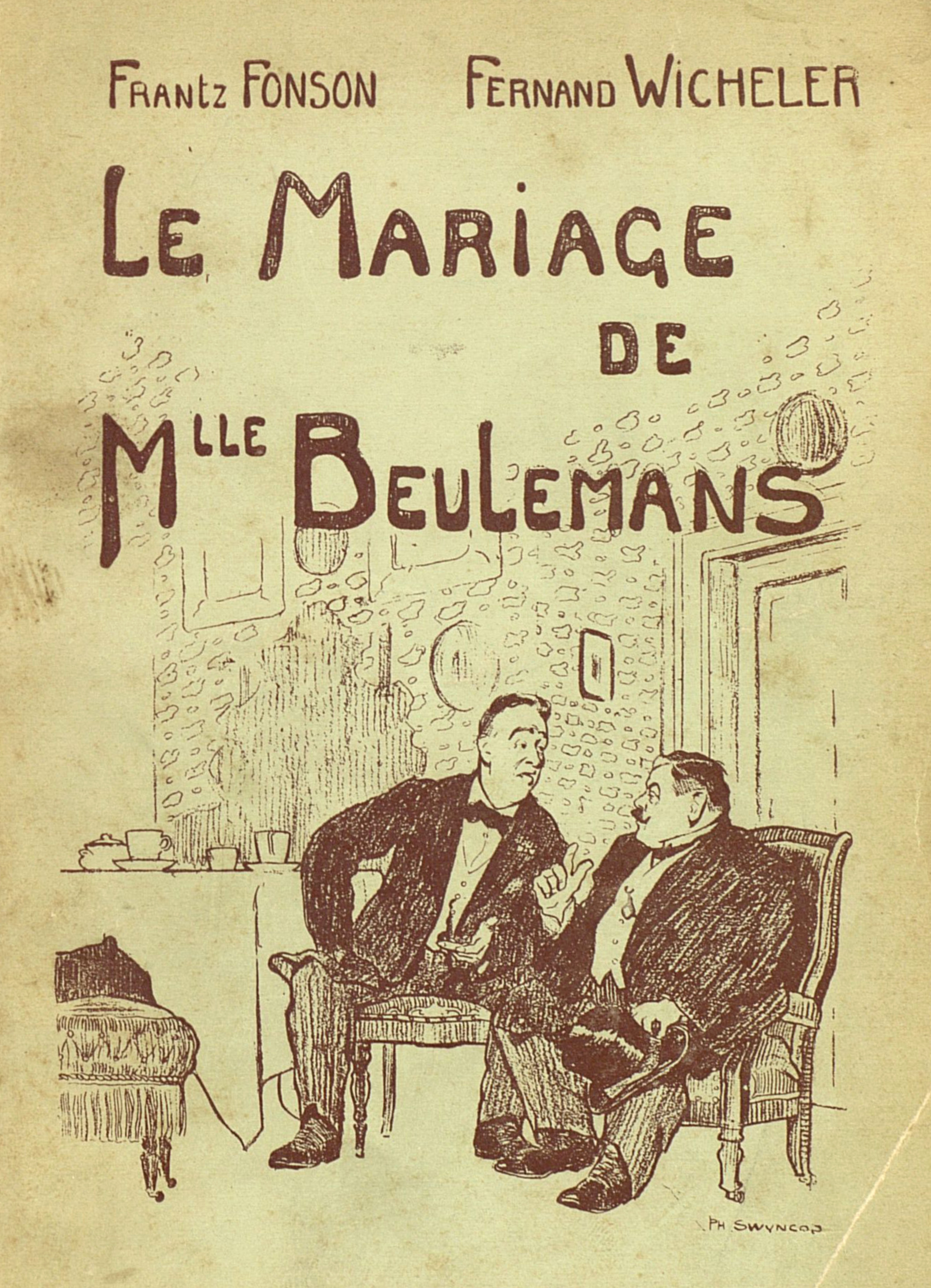
- Le Mariage de M^{lle} Beulemans first edition book's cover art by Philippe Swyncop
- Original language: French
- Written by: Frantz Fonson; Fernand Wicheler
- Subject: The only daughter of a wealthy Brusselian brewer is torn between the obligation of filial obedience, to marry the son of a competing brewer, and her fondness for the young intern from Paris.
- Genre: comedy
- Setting: Brussels

Premiere
- Date: 18 March 1910
- Place: Théâtre de l'Olympia in Brussels

Le Mariage de mademoiselle Beulemans (Note: The marriage of Miss Beulemans or Miss Beulemans' Wedding) is a three-act comedy play written in 1910 by the Belgian playwrights Frantz Fonson and Fernand Wicheler. It is a bourgeois situation comedy of manners and character, and a satire on the aspirations and issues of the lower middle class that emerged in Brussels in the early 20th century.

Combining French with the dialect and particular humour of Brussels, the play was an instant success both in its home country and abroad, and has continued to enjoy revivals and been met with a positive audience. Le Mariage de mademoiselle Beulemans is widely regarded nowadays as an integral piece of Brussels' folklore, known for its people's good-natured cockiness, and endures as part of the Belgian heritage.

== Summary ==
The play is set in the City of Brussels, where Mademoiselle Suzanne Beulemans, the daughter of a prosperous brewer, is betrothed to Séraphin Meulemeester, the son of a competitor in the same profession. This union, however, is not founded on matters of the heart, but rather upon the material inducement of the dowry, which greatly motivates the young Séraphin and his calculating father.

Yet, there is a rival to this unromantic match in the person of Albert Delpierre, a young Frenchman of amiable disposition, placed under Ferdinand Beulemans' tutelage for instruction in the art of brewing. Albert, deeply enamoured of the fair Suzanne, learns of a serious indiscretion on the part of his rival: Séraphin maintains a clandestine attachment to a working woman, by whom he has already fathered a child. Though Albert, in an act of honour, swears to preserve this awkward secret, fate intercedes; for Suzanne, through the revelations of her maid Isabelle, is soon apprised of the affair.

Suzanne ends her engagement with Séraphin and asks him to acknowledge his relationship and responsibilities as a father. The dissolution of the engagement leads to conflict between the elder brewers, who compete for the position of honorary president of the brewers' society.

In the end, Suzanne and Albert employed their wit and influence to secure the election of Beulemans, an act that earns the young suitor the heartfelt gratitude of his intended's father, bringing the play to a lively and satisfying conclusion.

== Cast ==
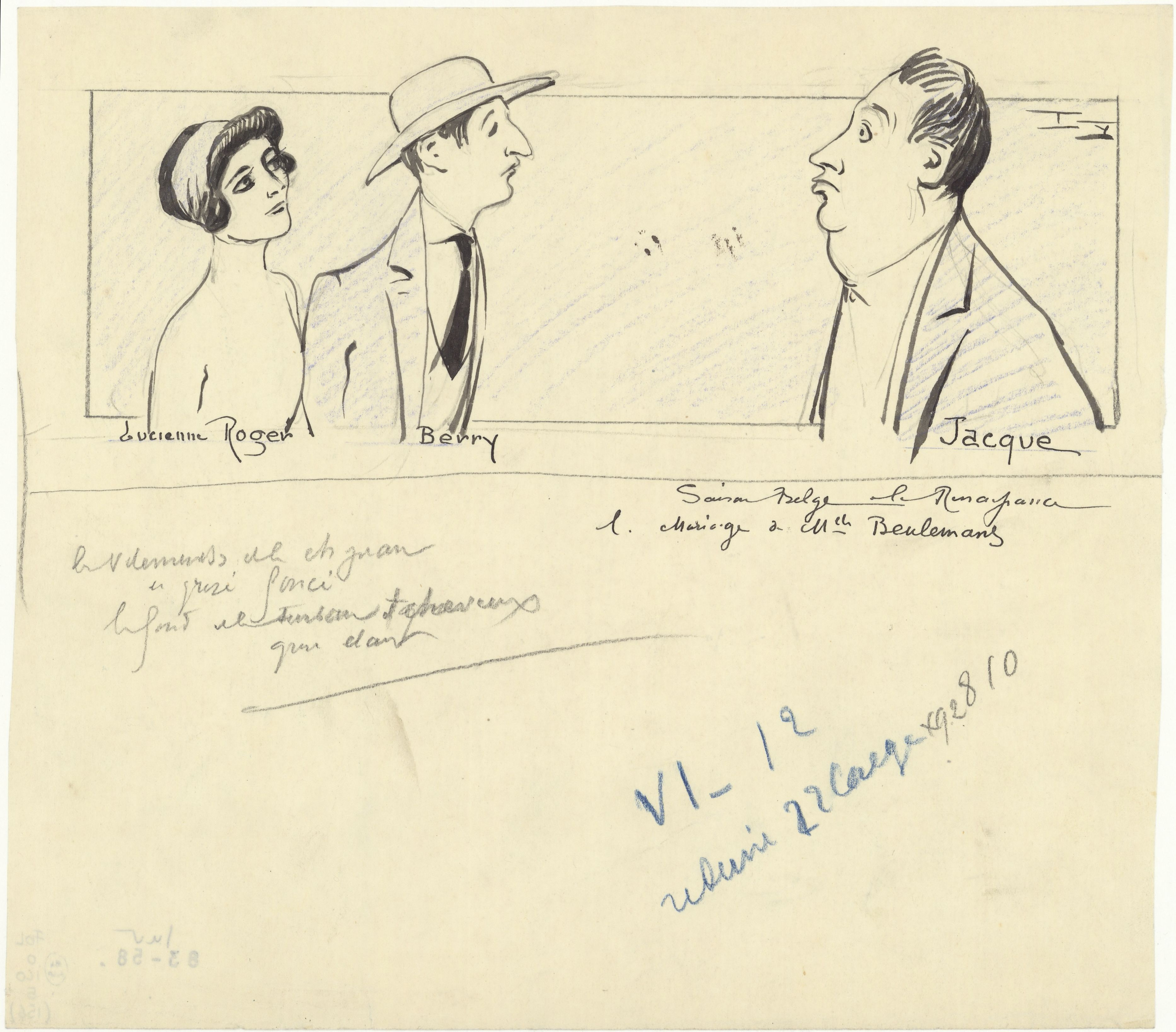
Lucienne Roger, Jules Berry and Alfred Jacque at Paris' Théâtre de la Renaissance in 1910. Illustration by Maurice Lourdey.

Original cast members throughout the first Belgian and French runs featured:

- Lucienne Roger as Suzanne Beulemans, the only Beulemans daughter
- Alfred-Louis Jacque as Ferdinand Beulemans, (Note: Credited only as Jacque in the original cast, Alfred-Louis Jacque, in full, was the first to play the role of Ferdinand Beulemans.) Brussels brewer, Suzanne's father
- Vara as Hortense Beulemans, Suzanne's mother
- Jules Berry as Albert Delpierre, young Frenchman employed by Beulemans
- Frémont as Monsieur Delpierre, French shopkeeper, Albert's father and acquaintance of Beulemans
- Merin as Séraphin Meulemeester, Suzanne's fiancé
- Ambreville as Monsieur Meulemeester, Séraphin's father
- Vitry as Isabelle, Maid
- Mylo as Mostinckx, committee president
- Marmont as Verduren, committee secretary
- Daix as Baron, committee treasurer
- Duro, Delferrière, Nobel, Lennac, Cerrébos as committee members
- Cilly as Octavie, waitress

The production crew included Frantz Fonson as stage director and Albert Dubosq as scenographer.

== History ==
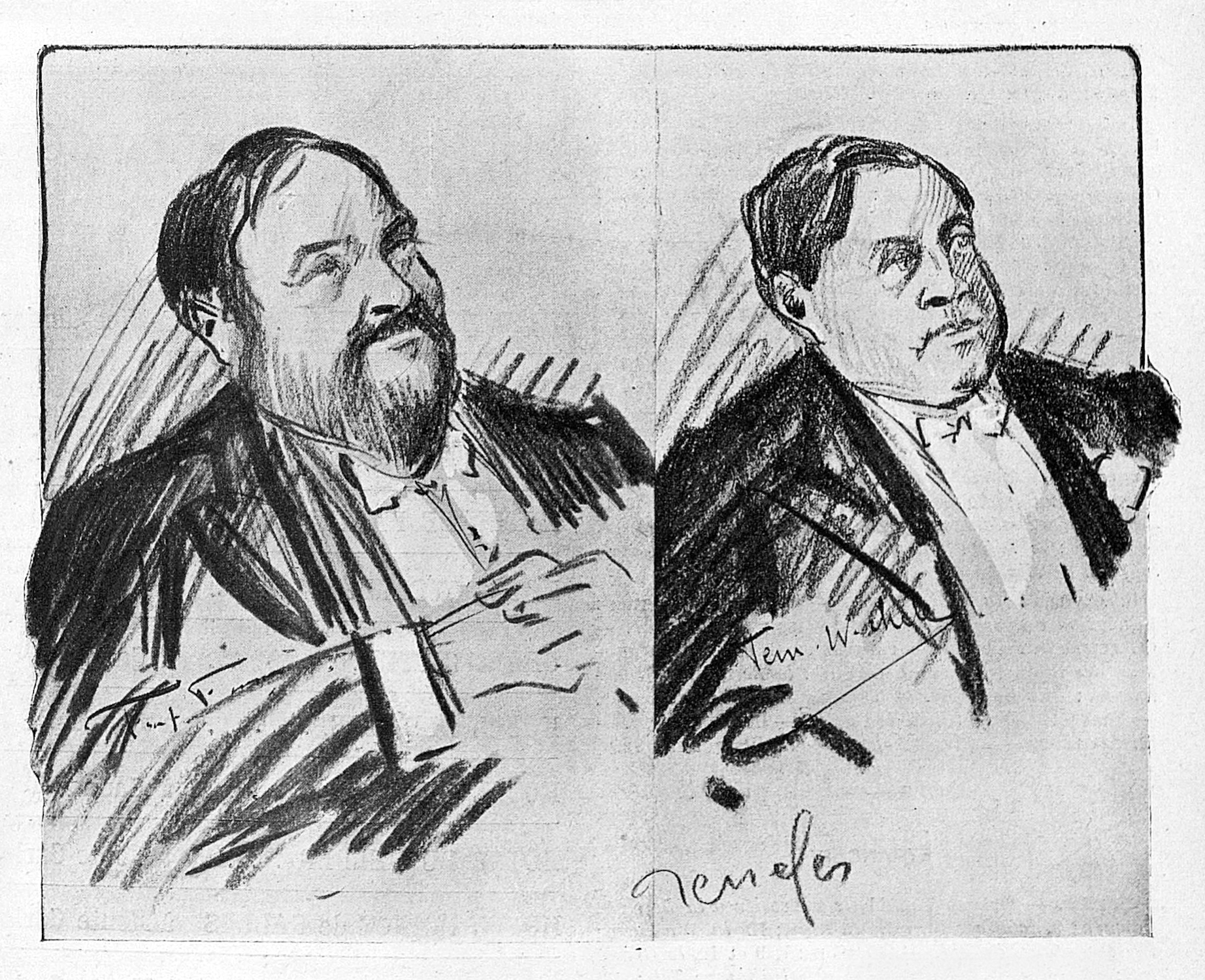
The two authors of the play, Frantz Fonson and Fernand Wicheler. Illustration by Raymond Renefer.

Most likely inspired by both his own familial heritage and the vivid portrayals of Brussels life found in the works of Belgian novelist Léopold Courouble, whose depiction of the Kaekebroeck family's manners proved to be of particular note, Frantz Fonson, in partnership with his fellow dramatist Fernand Wicheler, set about crafting Le Mariage de mademoiselle Beulemans.

This delightful comedy was conceived in response to the unforeseen cancellation of a Parisian theatre company's much-anticipated anticipated engagement at Brussels' Théâtre de l'Olympia in the spring of 1910, a void which Fonson and Wicheler, with no small measure of style and enterprise, were quick to fill.

=== Premieres ===
The play premiered at Brussels' Théâtre de l'Olympia on 18 March 1910, and went on to Paris with the original cast, at the Théâtre de la Renaissance on 7 June 1910. It had its first Swiss staging in Geneva the same year.

In 1911, while he was undertaking his first tour across South America with the Régnier-Tarride theatre company, Lucien Guitry directed the play's first stage performance outside Europe and interpreted Ferdinand Beulemans' role. It premiered at Rio de Janeiro's Theatro Municipal on 9 July. Members of the original French cast included Guitry's wife, Jeanne Desclos, in the role of Suzanne Beulemans, Louis Sance as Albert Delpierre and Gabriel Signoret as M. Meulemeester. An amateur production of the play was simultaneously staged for the first time in Buenos Aires by Julian Jaraczewski on behalf of the Belgian photographic association.

Produced by Charles Frohman, the London premiere of the play took place in 1911, at the Globe Theatre on 16 September. It was performed in French by the original cast of the Bouffes-Parisiens including Alfred Jacque, Jules Berry and Gilberte Legrand. Le Mariage de mademoiselle Beulemans lasted for sixteen performances at the Globe Theatre and enjoyed some success with London audiences.

In 1912, French producer and actor Paul Derval mounted a tour across former French Algeria. Le Mariage de mademoiselle Beulemans premiered for the first time in Africa at Algiers' Kursaal on 27 September. Belgian actor Balthus performed the role of Ferdinand Beulemans with Belgian actress Yvonne Talbrys in the title role, and entertained French-speaking audiences in various performance halls throughout Algerian cities.

=== Sequels ===
In the wake of the play's success, the authors wrote an operetta-like sequel, in three acts and four scenes, entitled: Beulemans marie sa fille. (Note: Beulemans marries his daughter) The music was composed by Arthur van Oost. The operetta was first seen in Brussels at the Théâtre royal des Galeries on 18 October 1912, with Yvonne Gay, (Note: In the role of Suzanne Beulemans) Alfred Jacque, (Note: In the role of Ferdinand Beulemans) Berthe Charmal, (Note: In the role of Hortense Beulemans) Georges Foix, (Note: In the role of Albert Delpierre) Emile Mylo (Note: In the role of Séraphin Meulemeester) and Nicolas d'Ambreville (Note: In the role of Monsieur Meulemeester) in major roles.

=== Tribute ===
The success of the play with audiences outside Belgium, despiste its strong local colour, strengthened Marcel Pagnol's will to write his Marseillian trilogy Marius, Fanny, and César. On the fiftieth anniversary of the play, the French academician met Lucien Fonson and told him how deeply his work was indebted to Le Mariage de mademoiselle Beulemans. The text of his statement is curated at Brussels' Théâtre royal des Galeries, (Note: The text may be translated as follows: Around 1925 I discovered I loved Marseilles, for I felt like an exile in Paris, and I wanted to express this attachment by writing a Marseillian play. Some friends and elders dissuaded me from doing so. They told me that a work in so localised a context, which would put on show characters saddled with such a particular accent, would certainly not be understood outside of Bouches-du-Rhône, and that in Marseilles itself it would be considered an amateur work. These arguments seemed sound and I gave up on my project. But in 1926 I saw Le Mariage de Mlle Beulemans; this masterpiece was already sixteen years old and its success had gone around the world. That night, I realised that a local, but profoundly sincere and authentic play could sometimes have a place in the literary heritage of a country and appeal to the whole world. So I tried to do for Marseilles what Fonson and Wicheler had done for Brussels, and that's how a Belgian brewer became the father of César and how the charming Mademoiselle Beulemans brought Marius into the world at the age of seventeen. Another character also owes his existence to the Brussels comedy: this is Monsieur Brun who is somehow, rather ironically, the illegitimate son of the Parisian Albert Delpierre. I had indeed noticed that his accent formed a pleasant contrast to that of the Beulemans family and highlighted the Brussels flavour of the play. Here's why I placed a man from Lyon at César's Marseillian bar.) and remained as the tribute of renown to Fonson and Wicheler's masterpiece.

== Adaptations ==
=== Settings in French ===
In 1927, French film director Julien Duvivier adapted the play for the cinema as a silent film, which starred French film actress Andrée Brabant in the lead role, using the same title. This first screen adaptation premiered the same year at Paris' Electric-Palace-Aubert on 23 September. The play was also adapted to the screen in 1932 by Jean Choux, and in 1950 by André Cerf, who both titled their film just as their predecessor did in 1927.

Pierre Brive adapted the play, to which he gave the same title, for radio, and this version was broadcast on 9 April 1943, as part of the national evening program on Radio Paris.

The French-language division of the Belgian public broadcaster produced and broadcast several television adaptations; with the following casts:

- 1967: Christiane Lenain (Suzanne), Jacques Lippe (M. Beulemans), Irène Vernal (Mme Beulemans), Jean-Pierre Loriot (Séraphin), Alain Robert (Albert), Marcel Roels (M. Meulemeester)
- 1978: Ania Guédroitz (Suzanne), Jacques Lippe (M. Beulemans), Christiane Lenain (Mme Beulemans), Olivier Monneret (Séraphin), Leonil Mc Cormick (Albert), Robert Roanne (M. Meulemeester)
- 1998: Cécile Florin (Suzanne), Raymond Pradel (M. Beulemans), Anne Deroever (Mme Beulemans), Pierre Pigeolet (Séraphin), Damien Gillard (Albert), Robert Roanne (M. Meulemeester) – Production by Théâtre de Montreux (Swiss)
- 2004: Cécile Florin (Suzanne), Daniel Hanssens (M. Beulemans), Pascale Vyvère (Mme Beulemans), Pierre Pigeolet (Séraphin), Damien Gillard (Albert), Robert Roanne (M. Meulemeester) Claudie Rion (Isabelle)
- 2014: Wendy Piette (Suzanne), Daniel Hanssens (M.Beulemans), Manuel Servais (Mme Beulemans), Denis Carpenters (Seraphin), Damien De Dobbeleer (M Albert), Laure Godisiabois (Isabelle), Pascal Racan (M Delpierre), Michel Poncelet (M Meulemeester), Bernard Lefranc (president), Jean-Paul Clerbois (secretary)
- 2014, featured a cast of Belgian television presenters: Caroline Veyt (Suzanne), Guy Lemaire (M. Beulemans), Marie-Hélène Vanderborght (Mme Beulemans), Adrien Devyver (Séraphin), Stéphane Jobert (Albert), Hubert Mestrez (M. Meulemeester), Sara de Paduwa (Isabelle)

=== Settings in Flemish ===
The play was adapted into an Antwerpian context by Belgian writer Antoon de Graef and published in Antwerp as Fientje Beulemans. (Note: Within the same cultural context, Beulemans marie sa fille was likewise adapted by Antoon de Graef, who tackled the play's sequel in its original, operetta form, as Uffra Beulemans gaat trouwen. It was first mounted at Antwerp's Scala music hall in March 1914, months before the war broke out.) This version of the play was first performed at Antwerp's Koninklijke Nederlandsche Schouwburg at the end of December 1910. Mmes Bertryn and Ruysbroek, and Messrs Gobau, Laroche and Van Ryn were cast for the leading roles. Some critics felt like Fonson and Wicheler's play was poorly adapted despite the cast's efforts to liven the performance up. Nonetheless, de Graef's adaptation had a greater appeal for the local audience and enjoyed successful revivals.

In the months that followed the outbreak of the First World War, Fientje Beulemans was staged at various Dutch theatres, with the exiled Flemish theatre troupe of the Antwerp's Koninklijke Vlaamsche Schouwburg. The adapted play, which starred Belgian actress Magda Janssens in the title role, was a runaway success with audiences across the Netherlands and lasted several months during wartime exile. The one hundredth performance of Fientje Beulemans was staged at Amsterdam's Flora Schouwburg in March 1916. De Graef's adaptation also enjoyed several revivals in Belgium and in the Netherlands over the years, including a 1952 Rotterdam production with Mieke Verstraete and Kees Brusse.

It was subsequently adapted for television by Belgian director Anton Peters with Chris Lomme performing the role of Fientje, produced by the Belgische Radio- en Televisieomroep and aired on 14 March 1974.

In 2002 Roger van de Voorde, stage director for the Brussels Volkstejoêter company, in collaboration with translator Claude Lammens, rewrote the play into Flemish Brusselian for the Flemish-speaking audiences. The rewritten play, now titled De Traafiest van Mademoiselle Beulemans, was staged partially on a grant from the Flemish Parliament by the Brussels Volkstejoêter company, and premiered at Brussels' Kaaitheater on 8 February 2003. More than 13,000 spectators came to see the thirty-eight performances of the play.

=== Settings in English ===
In 1910, Fonson and Wicheler's play was for the first time translated into American English as Suzanne by Charles Haddon Chambers, without any particular adaptation to any singular place and cultural background. It was mounted at the Lyceum in New York by Charles Frohman, with Billie Burke performing the role of Suzanne Beulemans, and received its premiere on 26 December of the same year. The play lasted sixty-four performances.

In 1912, Sydney Blow and Douglas Hoare wrote a new English translation and stage adaptation of the Belgian comedy set in the Welsh town of Carmarthen as Little Miss Llewelyn. The play, which starred Hilda Trevelyan in the title role, was produced at the Vaudeville Theatre in London's West End by Norman McKinnel and ran from 31 August 1912, to 20 February 1913, for a total of one hundred and eighty-six performances and achieved popular success.

In 1996, American playwright and translator David Willinger revisited the play, within its original time period, and set the plot in Brooklyn's Yiddish-speaking community. He published this new American English adaptation under the title of Miss Bullberg's Marriage. The play is still to be staged.

=== Settings in other languages ===
Besides inspiring two English adaptations in the authors' lifetime, the play has also been adapted, altered or translated and performed across different countries, and born several editions.

It was almost immediately translated by Hungarian writer Heltai Jenő and published in Budapest in 1910 as Beulemans Kisasszony házassága. It premiered on 5 October of the same year at the Vígszínház, Budapest's grand comedy theatre.

The play was presented and first staged with Galli theatre company in an Italian translation in Rome at the Teatro Valle on 11 January 1911, under the title Il matrimonio della signorina Beulemans.

A Czech version by Luděk Frič (Note: Luděk Frič was the pseudonym for Jan Lier, a Czech journalist, writer, and theater critic.) was mounted at Prague's National Theatre, the Národní divadlo, and premiered on 15 September 1911, as Vdavky slečny Beulemansovy.

A translated version of the play entitled Susanne verlobt sich, by German writer Theodor Ferdinand Bock, was produced in Berlin in 1911.

In 1912, Auguste Carton translated the play into Walloon under the name of L'mariatche delle fie Beulemance, or El mariâdje dèl fîye Beulemans, (Note: Written according the Feller system of spelling for the Walloon language.) and his version of the play was staged the same year at Charleroi's Théâtre des Variétés, which he directed for several years.

The play was adapted to the Danish stage by Danish writer Johannes Anker Larsen in collaboration with Danish screenwriter Paul Sarauw for the Folketeatret of Copenhagen as Anne-Maries giftermaal, or Annemaries giftermaal, and premiered on 3 November 1912.

A Brazilian Portuguese version entitled O casamento da senhorita Beulemans was published in Rio de Janeiro following its premiere at the Cinema Rio in August 1913, as translated by Brazilian writer Renato de Castro.

The play, which had its first performance in German in Berlin in 1911, was likewise mounted in German for the Austrian stage at Vienna's Lustspieltheater at the end of 1913 in an adaptation entitled Schwechater Lager.

The play was translated into Finnish as Kunnia-esimies Beulemans and premiered on 20 May 1914, at the Suomen Kansallisteatteri, in Helsinki.

On the evening of 10 April 1915, at Lisbon's Teatro da Avenida, the first performance in Portugal was given of Fonson and Wicheler's play, translated by Portuguese writer Accacio Antunes, under the title of O casamento da menina Beulemans.

Turkish writer Hüseyin Suâd Yalçın translated and altered the play in collaboration with Münir Nigâr as Kayseri Gülleri (Note: Roses of Kayseri). It premiered at Istanbul's Tepebaşı Theatre on 23 March 1918, and was first published in Ottoman Turkish in 1920. This version was given in modern Turkish transcription by Atabey Kılıç, and published in April 2016.

The play was adapted in Sweden by writer Algot Sandberg as Ann-Sofis giftermål and premiered at Stockholm's Södra Teatern on 24 September 1921.

In 1933, the play was adapted into an Alsatian context by bilingual poet, playwright and composer Victor Schmidt as D'Hochzitt vo d'r Mamsell Martischang, and premiered for the first time in Colmar in the vernacular by the local dialectal company Théâtre Alsacien de Colmar on 2 April. This Alsatian dialect stage production resulted in great success with local audiences and enjoyed revivals.

Aside from these translations or adaptations, it was alleged that the play was also adapted and introduced in Japan to a local audience.

== About the play ==
When Frantz Fonson died in December 1924, the exclusivity over all theatrical adaptations of the play, including professional and amateur, was left to the Théâtre royal des Galeries with his son Lucien as stage director, agreeably to his last will. The play passed into the public domain on the seventieth anniversary of Wicheler's death, in 2006.

Although a number of actors have added their own interpretations to the play, Gustave Libeau and Jacques Lippe are especially noted for their portrayals of Ferdinand Beulemans. Belgian actress Catherine Lenain was the worthy partner of Jacques Lippe and achieved fame in her performances, eleven years apart, of Beulemans' daughter and wife.
