= Inventory of Intangible Cultural Heritage in Brussels =

The Inventory of Intangible Cultural Heritage is a heritage register listing nationally significant intangible cultural heritage in Brussels.

== Intangible cultural heritage in the Inventory ==
English name	French name	Dutch name	Location	Period	Date	Photo	Source
Carillon culture	La culture du carillon	Beiaardcultuur	Brussels-Capital Region		2014		
The art of falconry	L'art de la fauconnerie	De kunst van de valkerij	Brussels-Capital Region		2016		
Beer culture	La culture de la bière	Biercultuur	Brussels-Capital Region		2016		
Ommegang			City of Brussels	Annually in early July	24 January 2017		
The fritkot culture	La culture du fritkot	De fritkotcultuur	Brussels-Capital Region		14 June 2017		
Meyboom			Brussels-Capital Region	Annually on August 9	6 October 2017		
Royal Theatre Toone	Théâtre Royal de Toone	Koninklijk Theater Toone	City of Brussels		10 April 2018		
The giants of Watermael-Boitsfort: Mieke, Janneke and Tichke	Les géants de Watermael-Boisfort : Mieke, Janneke et Tichke	De reuzen van Watermaal-Bosvoorde: Mieke, Janneke en Tichke	Watermael-Boitsfort		28 May 2018		
The giants of Stockel	Les géants de Stockel	De reuzen van Stokkel	Stockel		21 January 2019		
The Oaths of Brussels	Les Serments de Bruxelles	De Wapengilden van Brussel	City of Brussels				
The procession of St Guy and Our Lady of Grace in Anderlecht	La procession de Saint-Guidon et de Notre-Dame de Grâce à Anderlecht	De processie van Sint-Guido en Onze-Lieve-Vrouw-van-Gratie in Anderlecht	Anderlecht	Annually in September			
Saint Verhaegen	Saint-Verhaegen	Sint-Verhaegen	Brussels-Capital Region	Annually on November 20	29 July 2019		
The Flower Carpet of Brussels	Tapis de fleurs de Bruxelles	Het Bloementapijt van Brussel	City of Brussels	Biennial during the weekend of August 15	1 October 2020		
The artisinal know-how and tradition of speculoos in Brussels	Les savoir-faire artisanaux et la tradition du spéculoos à Bruxelles	Ambachtelijk vakmanschap en de speculoostraditie in Brussel	Brussels-Capital Region		4 December 2020		
The living funfair culture	La culture vivante de la fête foraine	De levende kermiscultuur	Brussels-Capital Region		15 January 2021		
The Cultivation and forcing of chicory in Brussels	La culture et le forçage du chicon à Bruxelles	De Teelt en de forcerie van witloof in Brussel	Brussels-Capital Region		15 March 2021		
Fanfare des Chasseurs de Prinkères			Brussels-Capital Region		1 June 2021		
The regional languages of Brussels	Les parlers bruxellois	De Brusselse streektalen	Brussels-Capital Region		15 December 2021		
The Brussels zwanze	La zwanze bruxelloise	De Brusselse zwans	Brussels-Capital Region		15 December 2021		
Brussels clubbing culture	La culture du clubbing bruxellois	Brusselse clubbingcultuur	Brussels-Capital Region		6 July 2023		
The art of comic books in Brussels	L’art de la Bande Dessinée à Bruxelles	De kunst van het stripverhaal in Brussel	Brussels-Capital Region		23 April 2024		
Brussels Pride			Brussels-Capital Region	Every year around May 17, IDAHOBIT	13 September 2024		
The tradition and craftsmanship of chocolate in Brussels	La tradition et le savoir-faire du chocolat à Bruxelles	De traditie en het vakmeesterschap van de chocolade in Brussel	Brussels-Capital Region		6 May 2025		
