= Bossemans et Coppenolle =

Bossemans et Coppenolle is a Belgian play by Joris d’Hanswyck and Paul Van Stalle written in 1938. Recent stagings include a performance at the Festival Bruxellons! in 2017.

== Concept ==
The story is a comedy about two dimwitted men from Brussels, Bossemans and Coppenolle. Much of the comedy comes from the fact that the characters all speak in the local Brusselian dialect, which added to its popularity in Brussels and Wallonia. The plot broadly parodies Romeo and Juliet, with the contending families on opposite side of the contemporary Brussels football rivalry between Daring Club de Bruxelles and Union Saint-Gilloise.

== Characters ==
- Bossemans, an interior decoration merchant
- Coppenolle, his friend
- Mme Coppenolle, Coppenolle's wife
- Madame Chapeau, an older lady, whose part is usually played by male actors
- Violette, who rents an apartment from Coppenolle
- Josef Bossemans, Bossemans' son
- Georgette Coppenolle, Coppenolle's daughter

== Legacy ==
The play became popular enough to run for several decades. In 1938, Gaston Schoukens even adapted it into film, starring Gustave Libeau, Marcel Roels, Billy Pitt and Léon Carny. The film also depicts an actual association football match between Belgian football clubs Royale Union Saint-Gilloise and Daring Club de Bruxelles.
