= Brusselian dialect =

Traditional dialects spoken in Brussels, Belgium

Brusselian
- Bruxellois (French); Brussels (Dutch)
- Native to: Belgium, specifically Brussels
- Language family: Indo-European: Dutch and French; Brabantian Dutch, Belgian French and Picard (partially); Brusselian
- Writing system: Latin script

Official status
- Recognised minority language in: Brussels-Capital Region; French Community of Belgium

Language codes
- ISO 639-3: None (mis)
- Location within Brussels
- Coordinates: 50°50′48.05″N 4°21′9″E

Brusselian, (Note: /ˈbrʌsəliən/; natively Brusseleer, Brusselair or Brusseleir; French: Bruxellois [bʁyksɛlwa]; Dutch: Brussels [ˈbrʏsəls]) also known as the Brusselian dialect or Brusselian dialects, (Note: Natively Brusselse sproek; French: Dialecte(s) bruxellois or Parler(s) bruxellois; Dutch: Brussels(e) dialect(en) or Brussels(e) streektaal(-alen)) is a grouping of several traditional dialects native to Brussels, Belgium. Belonging to a broader Franco-Flemish dialect continuum, they are distinct from standard Dutch and French, and comprise several historically and socially defined varieties, such as Flemish Brusselian (a heavily-Francisised Brabantian Dutch dialect with some Spanish loanwords), Beulemans (a distinct local form of French), Alf-en-alf (a mixed Franco-Flemish variety), and Bargades (a traditional marginal slang related to Bargoens). Marollian is also sometimes considered as a distinct variety of Brusselian.

From the late 19th century, Brusselian was gradually replaced by French, and to a lesser extent, after the Second World War, by standard Dutch. As a result, only a small portion of the Brussels population now speaks the traditional dialects, which survive primarily among older generations and in cultural activities and folklore. Since the late 20th century, preservation efforts have been underway, and in 2021, Brusselian was included in the inventory of intangible cultural heritage of the Brussels-Capital Region.

== History ==
On 15 December 2021, the Brusselian dialects were added to the inventory of intangible cultural heritage of the Brussels-Capital Region.

The Royal Theatre Toone, a folkloric theatre of marionettes in central Brussels, still puts on puppet plays in Brusselian.

== Varieties ==
The Brusselian dialects are not homogeneous. They have exhibited significant variations over time and between the different neighbourhoods of Brussels. The best-identified varieties are:

- Flemish Brusselian (French: Bruxellois flamand, Dutch: Brussels Vlaams), also known as Brussels Flemish (Note: Not to be confused with the colloquial Dutch/Flemish spoken in Brussels) or Brussels Vloms (Brabantian variant of vlaams; "Flemish"). It is a heavily-Francisised Brabantian Dutch dialect that incorporates a sprinkle of Spanish loanwords dating back to the rule of the Low Countries by the Habsburgs (1519–1713). It is distinct from written standard Dutch in vocabulary, grammar, and pronunciation.
- French Brusselian (French: Bruxellois français, Dutch: Brussels Frans), also known as Brussels French (Note: Not to be confused with the colloquial French spoken in Brussels) or Beulemans (from the title of a 20th-century popular play). It is a creole integrating French vocabulary into a Flemish grammatical structure. Formerly used by the Brussels lower middle class, it is often (wrongly) considered by the French as the "Belgian" dialect.
- Alf-en-alf (Brabantian variant of half-en-half; "half-and-half") or mixed Brusselian (Franco-Flemish).
- Bargades (Brabantian variant of Bargoens), old marginal and esoteric slang of criminals, tramps and travelling salesmen.

Although there is no consensus, Marollian is sometimes considered by some speakers and linguists as a distinct variety of Brusselian. A mixture of French, Picard and Flemish Brusselian, it was widely spoken in the Marolles/Marollen neighbourhood of the City of Brussels, from which it takes its name, until the 20th century. It still survives among a small minority of inhabitants called Brusseleers (or Brusseleirs), many of them quite bi- and multilingual in French and Dutch.

== Examples ==
The Brusselian word zwanze is commonly applied by speakers of French and Dutch to denote a sarcastic form of folk humour considered typical of Brussels.
