= Het Zinneke =

Sculpture in Brussels, Belgium

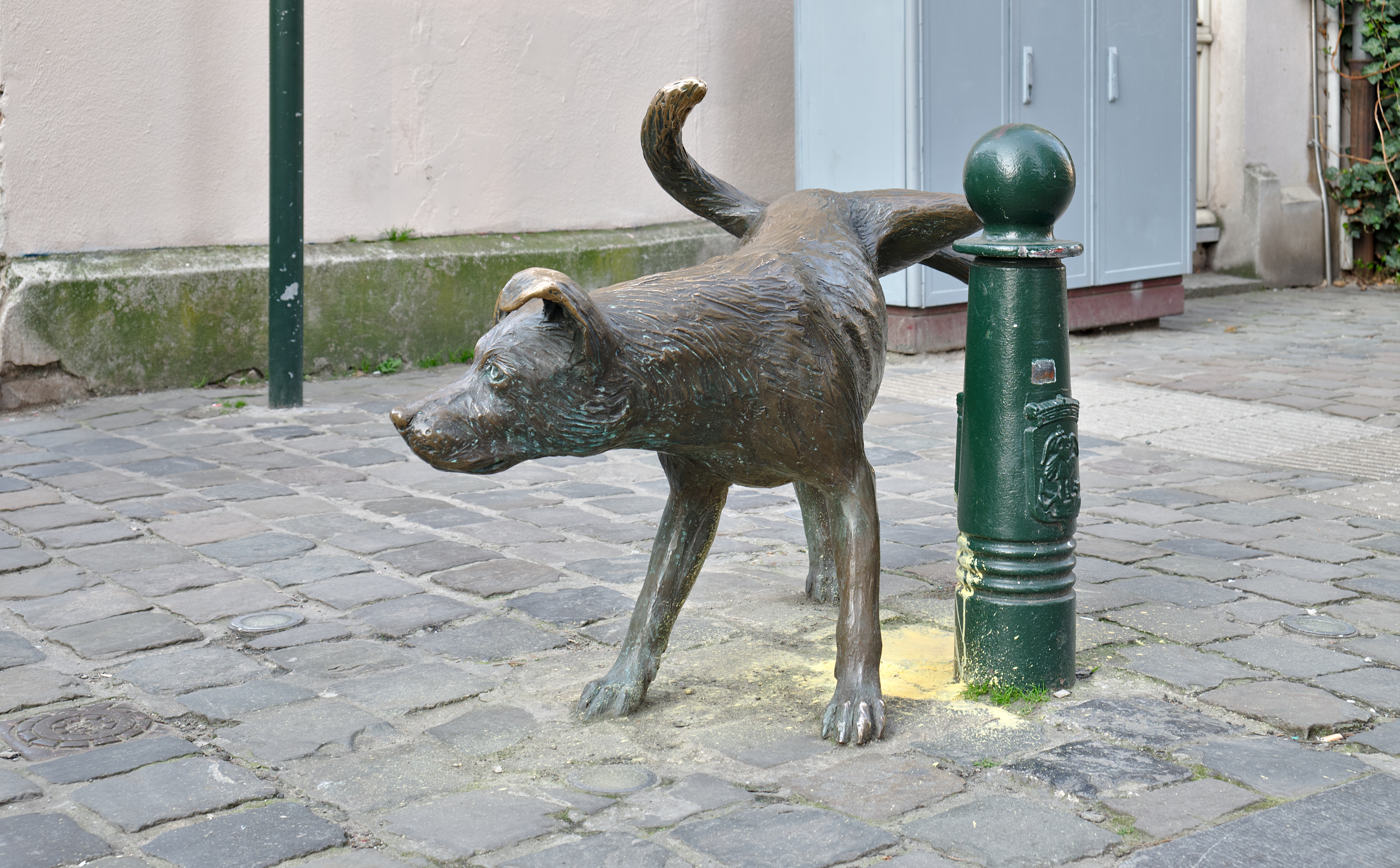
- Location within Brussels
- Artist: Tom Frantzen
- Year: 1999
- Type: Bronze
- Location: City of Brussels, Brussels-Capital Region, Belgium; 50°50′56″N 4°20′44″E

Het Zinneke (Brusselian dialect for "the mutt"), sometimes called Zinneke Pis by analogy with Manneken Pis, is a bronze sculpture in central Brussels, Belgium, erected in 1999. Created by Tom Frantzen, it represents a dog urinating against a bollard, along the same lines as Manneken Pis (a boy) and its derivative Jeanneke Pis (a girl). It is an example of folk humour (zwanze) popular in Brussels.

Het Zinneke is located at the junction of the Rue des Chartreux/Kartuizersstraat and the Rue du Vieux-Marché-aux-Grains/Oude Graanmarkt in the City of Brussels, not far from the Halles Saint-Géry/Sint-Gorikshallen, a market hall and cultural centre, and one of the capital's trendiest districts.

== Etymology ==
Zinneke is a nickname chosen to represent a person from Brussels who was not born there (the opposite of ketje for a native local). The word means "mutt" or "bastard" in the Brusselian dialect, and originally referred to the city's stray dogs that hung around the streets by the Lesser Senne (a tangent canal of the river Senne, which circumnavigated Brussels along the city walls) until the end of the 19th century (see covering of the Senne).

== History ==
=== Conception ===
The sculpture was created in 1999 by the artist Tom Frantzen, also known for other public statues in Brussels, such as the Vaartkapoen (1985) on the Place Sainctelette/Sainctelettesquare in Molenbeek-Saint-Jean, Madame Chapeau (2000) on the Rue du Midi/Zuidstraat, and L'Envol (2017) on the Place de la Vieille Halle aux Blés/Oud Korenhuisplein. It is a nod to the landmark sculpture Manneken Pis, in place since 1619, and its female counterpart Jeanneke Pis, installed in 1987. Unlike them, however, it is not associated with a fountain.

=== Damage and restoration ===
Het Zinneke was reported as stolen in the night of 11 March 2007, but a quick investigation revealed that it had been taken away for repairs by local residents who own the statue after vandals had tried to rip it out with force. Frantzen repaired the slightly damaged statue, which was reinstalled in its original place.

On 1 August 2015, Het Zinneke was struck by a car, and its two legs were broken. During its restoration by the sculptor, an explanatory note was attached on site. On 24 September 2015, the sculpture was placed back in its usual place.

== See also ==
- Zinneke Parade
- Bronze Zinneke
- List of depictions of urine in art
- Sculpture in Brussels
- History of Brussels
- Culture of Belgium
