= Bronze Zinneke =

Award given to people who contribute to the image of Brussels

The Bronze Zinneke is an award handed out by the cabinet of the Brussels Region to individuals, personalities, organisations, or companies that perform a role as informal ambassador of the Brussels Region or otherwise add to the positive image of the City and Region of Brussels.

The award is a miniature bronze version of Het Zinneke, a bronze sculpture of a urinating dog in central Brussels. A "zinneke" is a mutt or bastard in the Brusselian dialect, a cross between different races of dogs, and as such a symbol of the diversity of races and cultures in Brussels.

The first Bronze Zinneke was awarded in 2001 to singer Johan Verminnen.

== Recipients ==
Past recipients of the award include:

- footballers Paul Van Himst, Vincent Kompany and Youri Tielemans
- cycling legend Eddy Merckx
- chef Pierre Wynants
- jazz musician Toots Thielemans
- actor Pascal Duquenne
- patissier Herman Van Dender
- Paralympic bronze medal winner Pieter Cilissen
- foundation Fonds Carine Vyghen for organ donation
- football trainer Besnik Hasi
- racing car driver Jacky Ickx
- founder and former director of Brosella Folk & Jazz Festival Henri Vandenberghe
- illustrator, cartoonist, caricaturist and comic strip artist Eddy Vermeulen a.k.a. Ever Meulen and political cartoonist, graphic artist and painter Gerard Alsteens a.k.a. GAL
- Olympic silver medal winner Lionel Cox (sport shooter)
- entrepreneur Eric Everard
- owners of World Heritage Site Hôtel Solvay, the Wittamer family
- choreographer and founder of dance company Rosas, Anne Teresa De Keersmaeker
- singers Salvatore Adamo and Angèle
- former rectors of the Vrije Universiteit Brussel, Caroline Pauwels and Paul De Knop
- artist Marie-Pierra Kakoma a.k.a. Lous and the Yakuza
- organist, composer, conductor and opera director Bernard Foccroulle
- 2022 world champion road cycling Remco Evenepoel
- estaminet 'In 't Spinnekopke'
- president of the Companions of St. Lawrence, organizers of the Meyboom procession, Jan Brusten
