= Jeanneke Pis =

Fountain in Brussels, Belgium

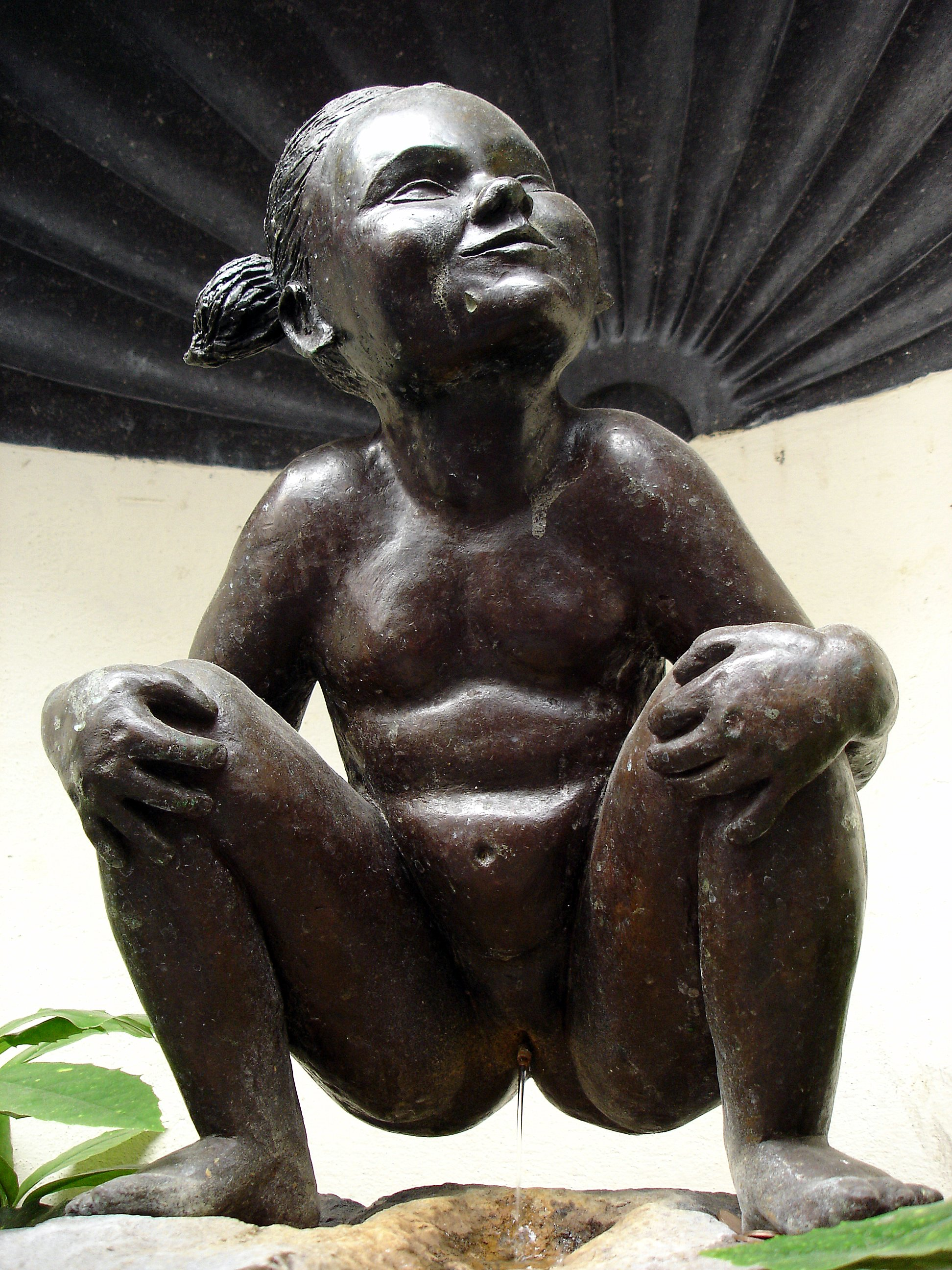
- Location within Brussels
- Artist: Denis-Adrien Debouvrie
- Year: 1985: creation; 1987: erection
- Type: Bronze
- Dimensions: 50 cm (20 in)
- Location: City of Brussels, Brussels-Capital Region, Belgium; 50°50′54.5″N 4°21′14.5″E
- Website: www.jeannekepis.be

Jeanneke Pis (pronounced [ˌʑɑnəkə ˈpɪs]; Dutch for 'Little Pissing Joan') is a modern fountain sculpture in central Brussels, Belgium. It was commissioned by Denis-Adrien Debouvrie in 1985 and erected in 1987 as a counterpoint to the city's famous Manneken Pis. The 50-centimetre (20 in) bronze statue depicts a naked little girl with short pigtails, squatting and urinating on a blue-grey limestone base.

Jeanneke Pis is located north of the Grand-Place/Grote Markt (Brussels' main square), on the eastern side of the Impasse de la Fidélité/Getrouwheidsgang (lit. 'Fidelity Alley'), a narrow cul-de-sac some 30 metres (100 ft) long leading northwards off the restaurant-packed Rue des Bouchers/Beenhouwersstraat. The sculpture is now protected from vandalism by iron bars.

== History ==
=== Conception and inauguration ===
Jeanneke Pis was conceived in 1985 by Denis-Adrien Debouvrie, who had been living in the Îlot Sacré district of Brussels for several years and owned several restaurants and properties in the Impasse de la Fidélité/Getrouwheidsgang. He proposed the statue as a way to restore waning interest in the alley and as a metaphorical method of "restoring equality between men and women" by creating a feminine counterpart to the city's Manneken Pis sculpture. The idea reportedly came to him one day while having breakfast, and he sketched the design on a paper tablecloth. Upon completing the sketch, Debouvrie is said to have remarked, "Now we have gender equality." The statue's appearance was also reportedly inspired by his younger sister Jenny as a child. Debouvrie subsequently commissioned a sculptor to realise the design.

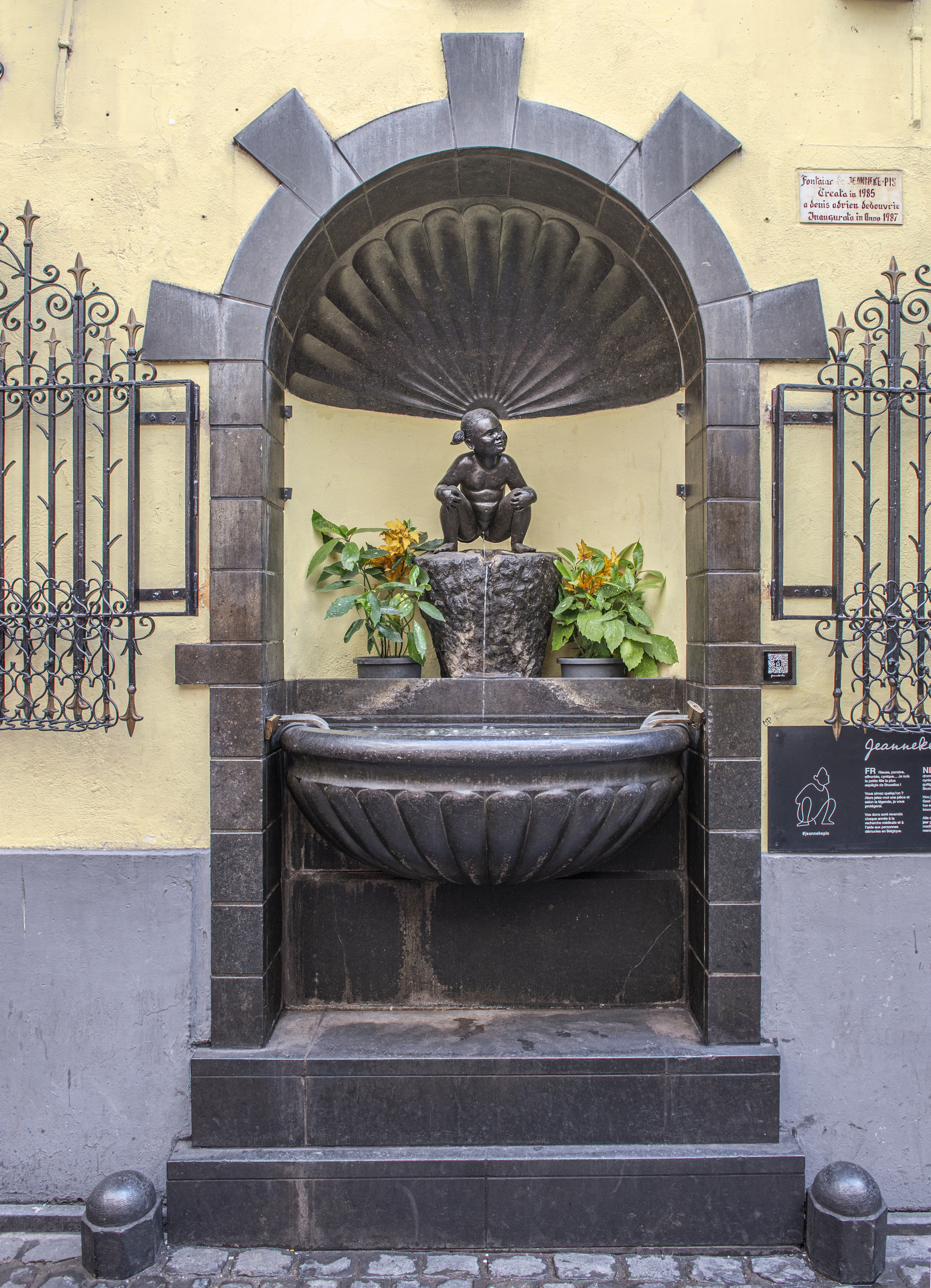
Jeanneke Pis is protected from vandalism by iron bars.

The 50-centimetre-tall (20 in) bronze statue was installed in a niche above a water basin at nos. 10 and 12 of the Impasse de la Fidélité. Jeanneke Pis was officially inaugurated on 24 June 1987 in the presence of city officials, representatives from the scientific community, and other guests. The first ceremony included the mayor of the City of Brussels and representatives of the non-profit organisation The Order of the Friends of Manneken Pis, while a second event featured the Italian politician and former porn star Ilona Staller, also known as "Cicciolina".

=== Coin tossing, charity and legacy ===
Soon after its installation, visitors began tossing coins into the fountain, a practice believed to ensure fidelity to loved ones. In 1987, the non-profit Horizon-Espoir ASBL was established to collect the coins, initially donating them to organisations researching treatments for HIV/AIDS. Since then, funds have also been allocated to the National Fund for Scientific Research (NFSR), UNICEF, cancer research, and other charitable causes in Belgium. To prevent vandalism and theft, the statue was later enclosed behind iron bars.

Over time, Jeanneke Pis became a notable tourist attraction in Brussels. In 2003, the Impasse de la Fidélité became home to the Delirium Café, which has since become known for its extensive beer menu. Several other establishments have also been set up in the alley, contributing to the area's recognition as a visitor destination. Following Debouvrie's death in December 2008, his relatives have continued to manage the statue's charitable contributions and maintain its presence in the alley.

== Legend ==
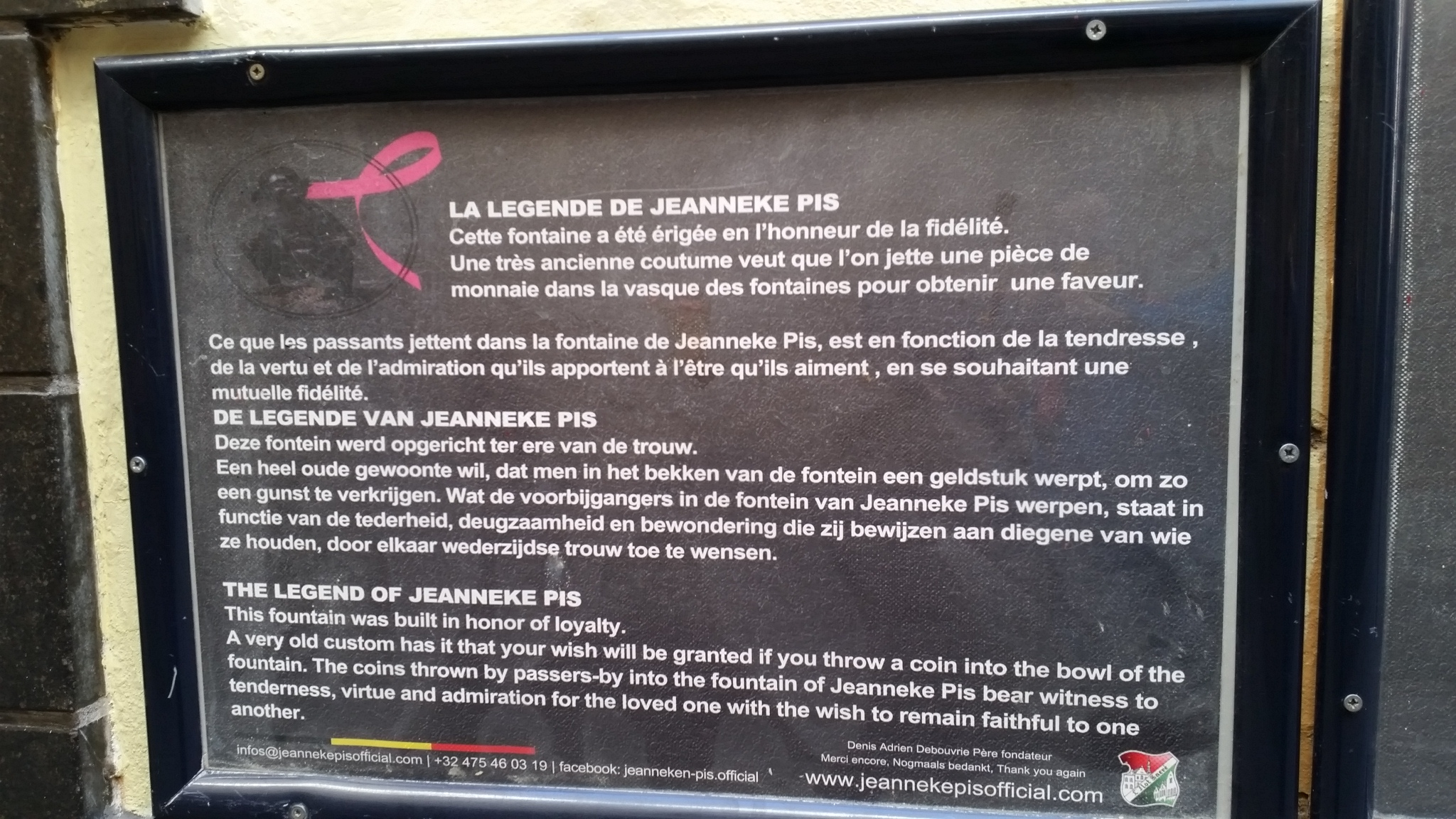
Former plaque with the legend that coins tossed into the basin ensure fidelity in love

Jeanneke Pis, like the alley itself, is traditionally associated with fidelity. Visitors often throw coins into the fountain's basin, a practice believed to reflect the depth of one's affection for a loved one. Over time, this custom also became linked to a broader tradition of making wishes at fountains.

A plaque next to the statue previously described the fountain as dedicated to loyalty and noted that coins thrown into its basin symbolised tenderness and fidelity. In December 2021, this plaque was replaced with a new one, written from the statue's perspective, acknowledging that the collected coins are used annually for medical research and charitable purposes.

== See also ==
- Het Zinneke
- List of depictions of urine in art
- Sculpture in Brussels
- History of Brussels
- Culture of Belgium
