= Manneken Pis =

Brass sculpture and fountain in Brussels, Belgium

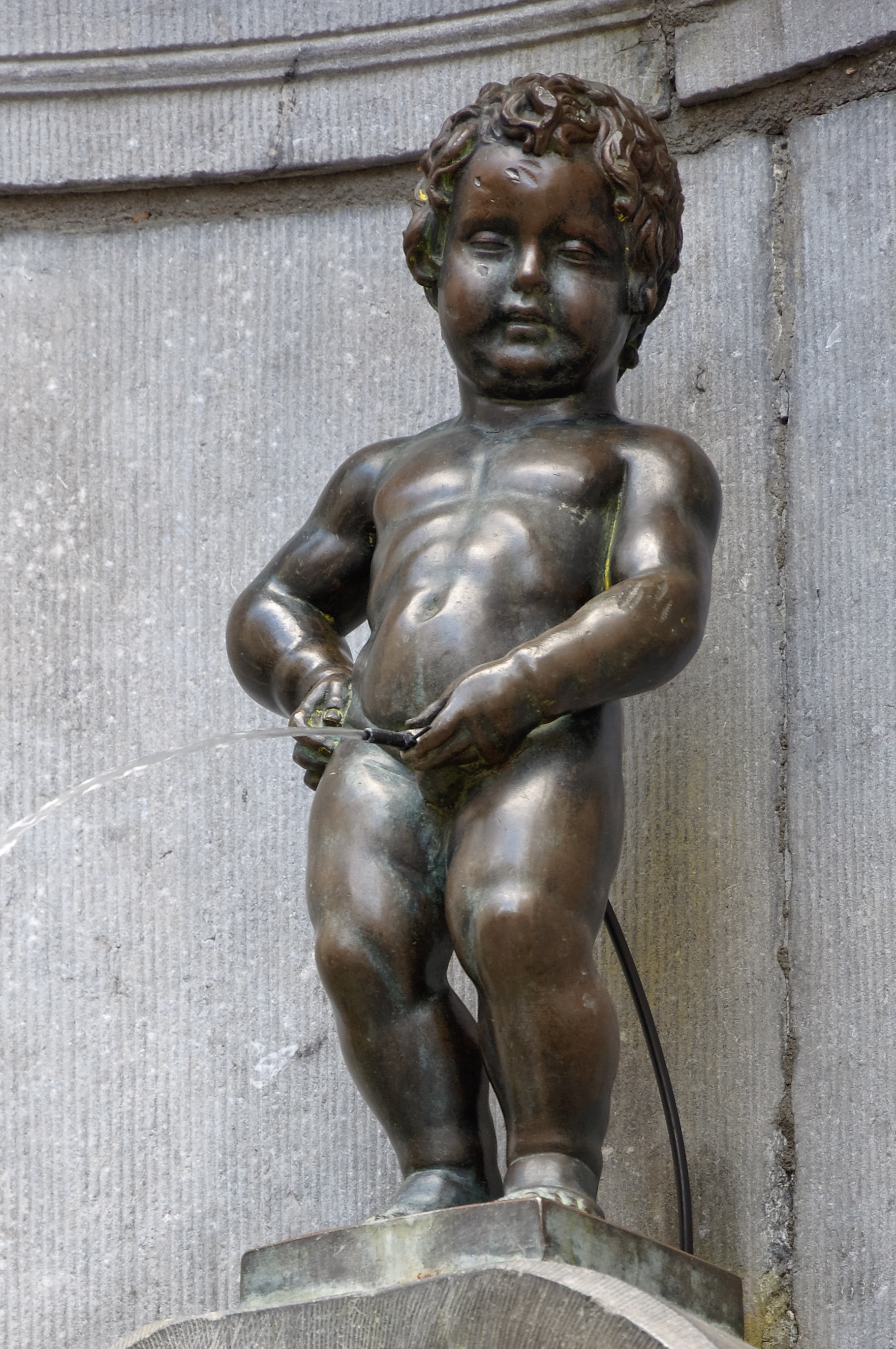
- Location within Brussels
- Artist: Jérôme Duquesnoy the Elder
- Year: 1619: original version; 1965: existing version
- Type: Bronze
- Subject: Puer mingens
- Dimensions: 55.5 cm (21.9 in)
- Location: City of Brussels, Brussels-Capital Region, Belgium; 50°50′42″N 4°21′00″E
- Website: www.brussels.be/manneken-pis

Manneken Pis (pronounced [ˌmɑnəkə(m) ˈpɪs]; Dutch for 'Little Pissing Man') is a landmark 55.5 cm (21.9 in) (Note: The sculpture measures 61 cm (24 in) including the base.) bronze fountain sculpture in central Brussels, Belgium, depicting a puer mingens: a nude boy urinating into the fountain's basin. Though its existence is attested as early as the mid-15th century, Manneken Pis was redesigned by the Brabantine sculptor Jérôme Duquesnoy the Elder and put in place in 1619. Its blue stone niche in rocaille style dates from 1770. The statue has been repeatedly stolen or damaged throughout its history. Since 1965, a replica has been displayed on site, with the original stored in the Brussels City Museum.

Manneken Pis is one of the best-known symbols of Brussels and Belgium, inspiring several legends, as well as numerous imitations and similar statues, both nationally and abroad. The figure is regularly dressed up and its wardrobe consists of around one thousand different costumes. Since 2017, they have been exhibited in a dedicated museum called GardeRobe MannekenPis, located on the same street. Owing to its self-derisive nature, Manneken Pis is also an example of belgitude (French; lit. 'Belgianness'), as well as of folk humour (zwanze) popular in Brussels.

Manneken Pis is approximately five minutes' walk from the Grand-Place/Grote Markt (Brussels' main square), at the junction of the Rue du Chêne/Eikstraat and the pedestrian Rue de l'Étuve/Stoofstraat.

== Naming ==
The statue's original name was Menneke(n) Pis or Menneke(n) Pist. In fact, in the Brabantian dialect of Brussels (known as Brusselian, and also sometimes referred to as Marollian), een manneke means a small man, whereas een menneke means a little boy (it is the diminutive of men, meaning boy), though in modern Flemish (the local variant of Dutch), menneke also means a small man (it is synonymous to mannetje). Nowadays, the name Manneken Pis (Dutch, pronounced [ˌmɑnəkə(m) ˈpɪs]), usually translated as "Little Pissing Man" or "Little Peeing Man" in English, is official in both French and Dutch.

Manneken Pis is sometimes given the nickname of Petit Julien in French or Julianske in Dutch (both meaning "Little Julian"), which in fact refers to a now-disappeared fountain of the "Little Julian" (Juliaenkensborre). This stems from a confusion by the 19th-century historians Alexandre Henne and Alphonse Wauters, who mistook the two distinct fountains because of their proximity. Due to its long history, the statue is also sometimes dubbed le plus vieux bourgeois de Bruxelles in French or de oudste burger van Brussel in Dutch ("the oldest bourgeois of Brussels").

== History ==
=== Origins ===
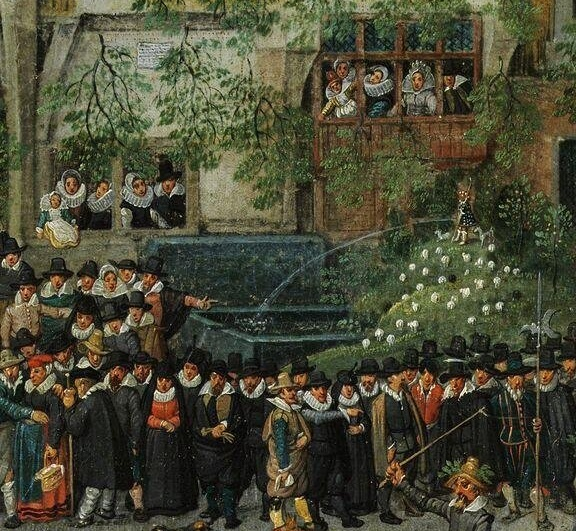
Detail from The Ommegang in Brussels on 31 May 1615 (Denis Van Alsloot, 1616). Manneken Pis (middle right) is dressed for the occasion.

The earliest mention of the existence of Manneken Pis dates from the mid-15th century, and can be found in an administrative document from 1451–52 about the water lines supplying the fountains of Brussels. (Note: The text mentions daer dmenneken pist in Old Dutch, meaning "where the little boy pees".) From the beginning, the fountain played an essential role in the distribution of drinking water. It stood on a column and poured water into a double rectangular basin of stone. The only representations of this first statue can be found, very schematically, on a map by the cartographers Georg Braun and Frans Hogenberg, in which the fountain appeared to be installed directly on the street and not on a corner as it is today. Manneken Pis is depicted again in a painting from 1616 by the court painters Denis Van Alsloot and Antoon Sallaert representing Brussels' Ommegang of 1615, as well as in a preparatory drawing to this painting, in which it is dressed as a shepherd.

The first statue was replaced with a new bronze version, commissioned in 1619 by the Brussels City Council. This 55.5-centimetre-tall (21.9 in) bronze statue, on the corner of the Rue de l'Étuve/Stoofstraat and the Rue des Grands Carmes/Lievevrouwbroerstraat, was conceived by the Brabantine sculptor Jérôme Duquesnoy the Elder, father of the architect and sculptor Jérôme Duquesnoy the Younger and the sculptor François Duquesnoy. It was probably cast and installed in 1620. (Note: As seen on the current base of the original statue kept at the Brussels City Museum.) During that time, the column supporting the statue and the double rectangular basin collecting water were completely remodelled by the stone cutter Daniel Raessens.

=== 17th–19th centuries ===
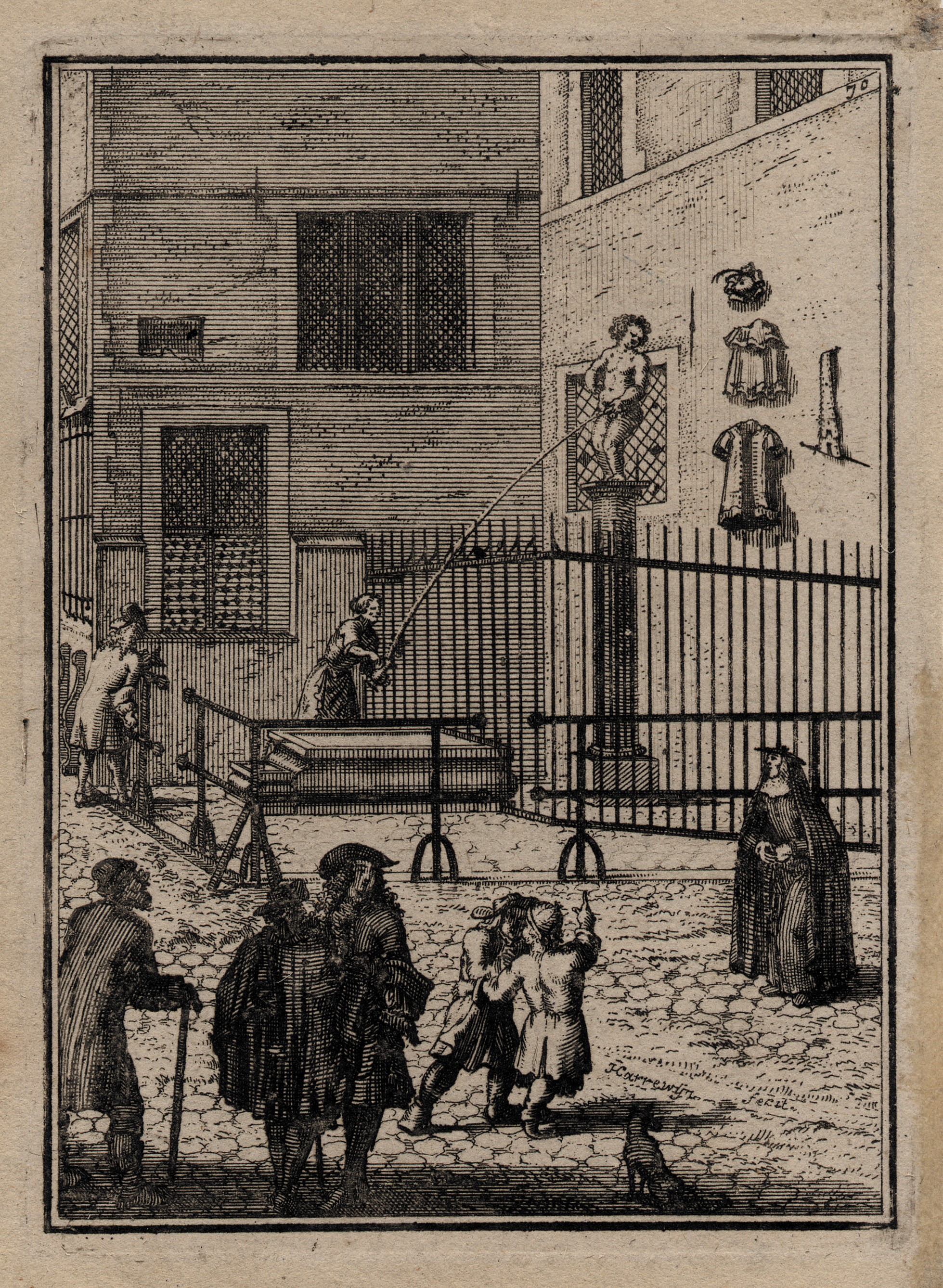
View of the Fountain of Manneken Pis, etching by Jacobus Harrewijn from Les délices des Pays-Bas, 1697

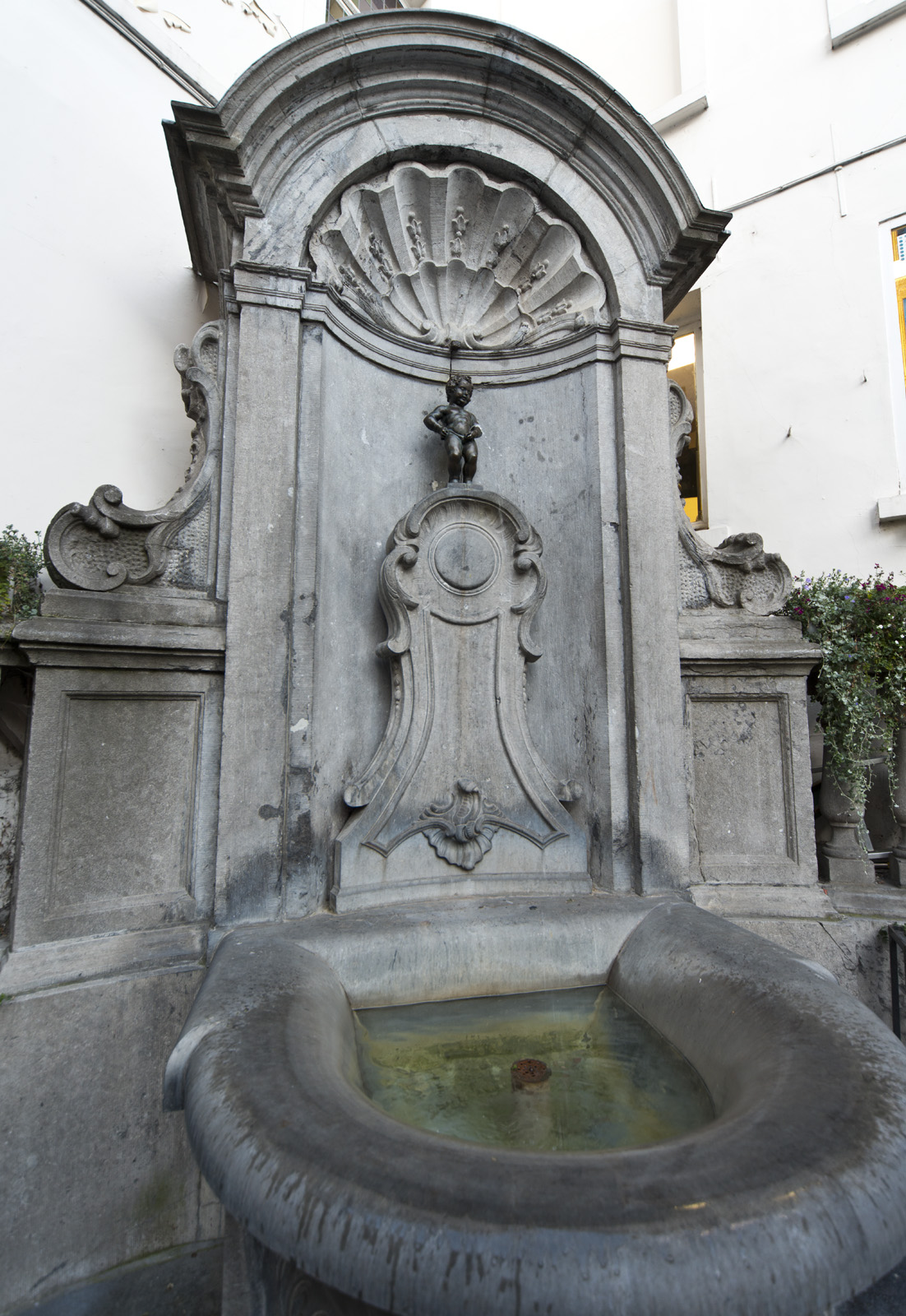
Manneken Pis in its rocaille-style niche, fitted in 1770, appears to be smaller than in its original setting.

During its history, Manneken Pis faced many hazards. It survived undamaged the bombardment of Brussels of 1695 by the French army, but the pipes having been affected, it could not deliver its water for some time. A pamphlet published the same year recounts this episode. This text is the oldest attesting that Manneken Pis had become "an object of glory appreciated by all and renowned throughout the world". It is also the first time that it served as a symbol for the people of Brussels. It is also traditionally said that after the bombardment, it was triumphantly placed again on its pedestal. On that occasion, the following passage from the Bible was inscribed above its head: In petra exaltavit me, et nunc exaltavi caput meum super inimicos meos ("The Lord placed me on a stone base, and now I raise my head above my enemies").

As shown by an engraving by Jacobus Harrewijn, dating from 1697, the fountain was no longer located on the street, but in a recess at the corner of the Rue du Chêne/Eikstraat and the Rue de l'Étuve/Stoofstraat and was protected by a gate. In 1770, the column and the double rectangular basin disappeared; the statue was integrated into a new decor, in the form of a blue stone niche in rocaille style, originating from another dismantled fountain of Brussels. The water simply flowed through a grating in the ground, which was replaced with a basin in the 19th century. In its new setting, Manneken Pis gives the impression of being smaller than in its original layout.

The whole structure is protected by wrought iron railings, the last version of which dates from 1851. The latter prevented access to water, relegating the fountain to a decorative and symbolic role. It is also the case, around the same time, of the other fountains in Brussels. This correlates with efforts by the City of Brussels, starting in 1855, to allow for the distribution of drinking water in homes.

The figure has repeatedly been the object of theft or attempted theft. Legend has it that the statue was removed in 1745 by English soldiers and found in the Flemish town of Geraardsbergen (French: Grammont). As a sign of their appreciation, the people of Brussels gave this city a replica of the statue. A second attempted theft was allegedly made in 1747 by a group of French grenadiers stationed in Brussels. The population rebelled against this deed and threatened a bloody revenge. To calm things down, the King of France, Louis XV, offered a gentleman's gown of brocade, embroidered with gold, to Manneken Pis. He also authorised the statue to carry the sword, and decorated it with the Cross of St. Louis.

The statue was stolen in 1817 by the freed convict Antoine Licas or Lycas. The perpetrator was heavily punished; he was condemned to forced labour for life, and was first tied for an hour to stocks on the Grand-Place/Grote Markt. The original statue was broken into eleven pieces during this abduction and was restored by a specialised welder, under the supervision of sculptor Gilles-Lambert Godecharle. The pieces were matched and used to make a mould in which the bronze statue was poured. The statue was then screwed onto a new copper base marked "1620 – REST 1817".

=== 20th century – present ===
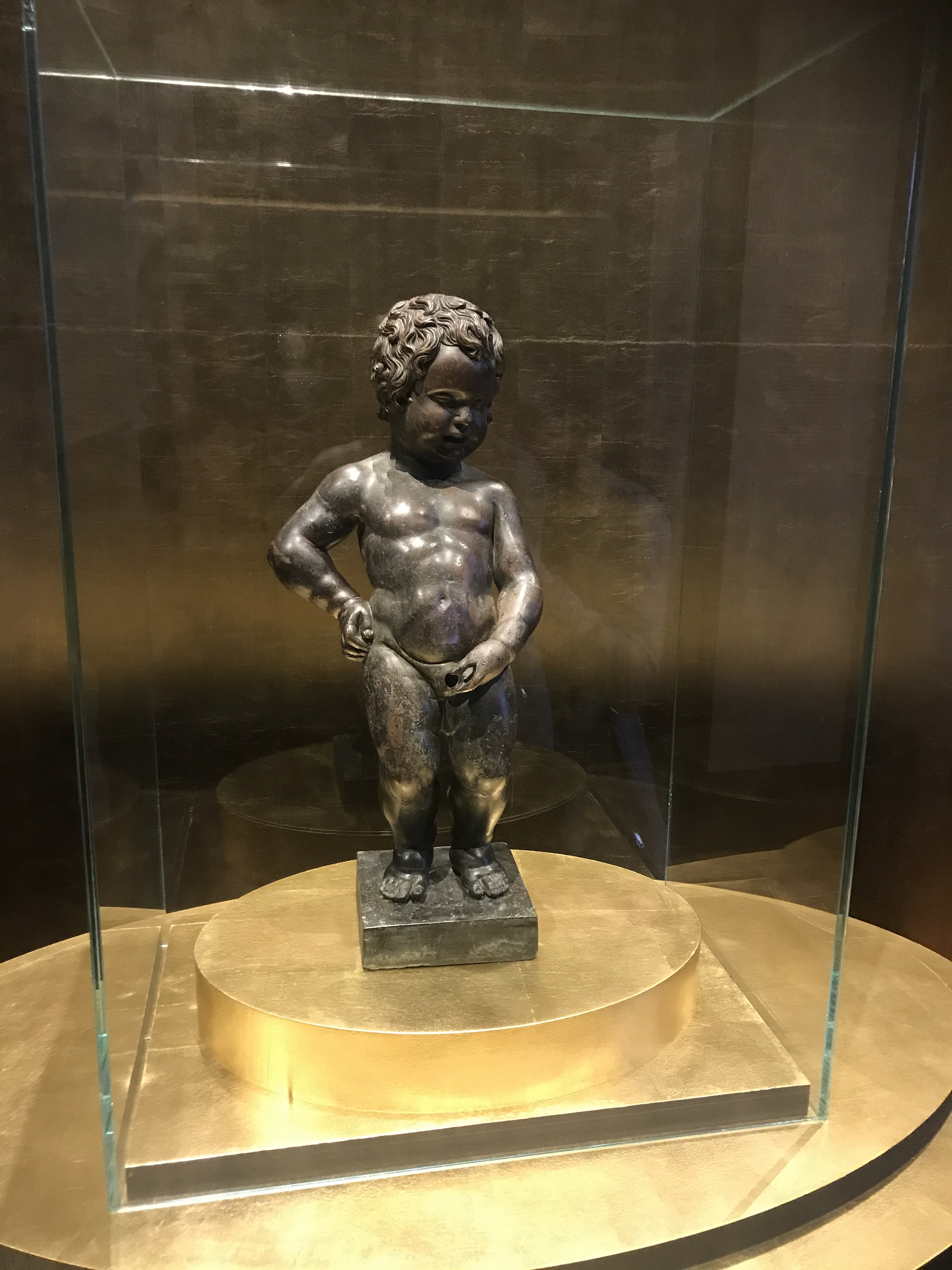
The original Manneken Pis statue from 1619 is kept at the Brussels City Museum.

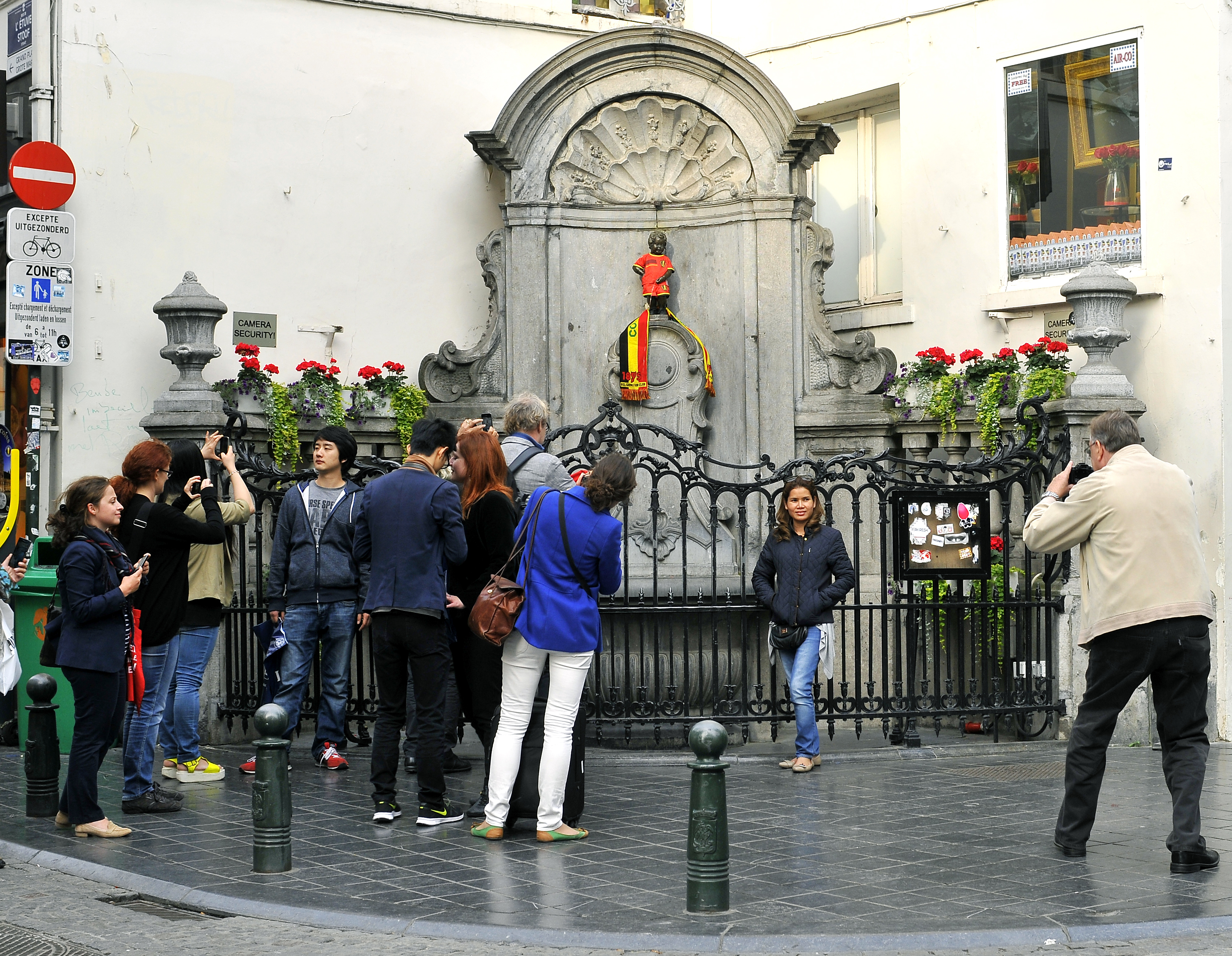
The surroundings of Manneken Pis give an idea of its size.

Manneken Pis experienced similar misadventures in the 20th century. Two attempted thefts occurred in 1955 and 1957. Some accounts say that it has been stolen up to seven times. Notably, in January 1963, students of the Antwerp student's association "De Wikings" of the Sint-Ignatius Handelshogeschool (Higher Business Education), now part of the University of Antwerp, "hijacked" the statue for five days before handing it over to the Antwerp authorities. The local and international press covered the story, contributing to the students' collection of funds donated to two orphanages. The case did go further, however, and the base was replaced identically by the Compagnie des Bronzes de Bruxelles, to which the statue was anchored by a reinforced bronze attachment.

Things were more serious when it disappeared in 1965; the statue had been broken by the thief and only the feet and ankles remained. In June 1966, the Antwerp magazine De Post received an anonymous phone call, signalling that the "body" was in the Charleroi Canal. It was found there by divers, sent by the magazine, and was brought back to Brussels on 27 June. Restored once again, the statue was sheltered and the original version is now kept and displayed on the second floor of the Brussels City Museum, at the King's House, on the Grand-Place. In the meantime, a replica of the statue had already been commissioned by Brussels' authorities and cast by the Compagnie des Bronzes. The new statue was thus installed in place of the old one and this version still adorns the niche on the Rue du Chêne to this day.

In late 2018, city technician Régis Callens discovered that the basin of the statue had developed a leak, leading to a reported 1,000–1,500 litres (220–330 imp gal; 260–400 US gal) of water being used per day. The leak occurred for an unknown number of years, unnoticed among the several hundred water features in the City of Brussels and was only later discovered with the help of Shayp water monitoring technology. The statue received a temporary fix in March 2019, with a permanent recirculating system set to be installed. The solution was announced during Brussels Water Week where city officials cited the situation as motivation to check for similar problems in other fountains.

== Legends ==
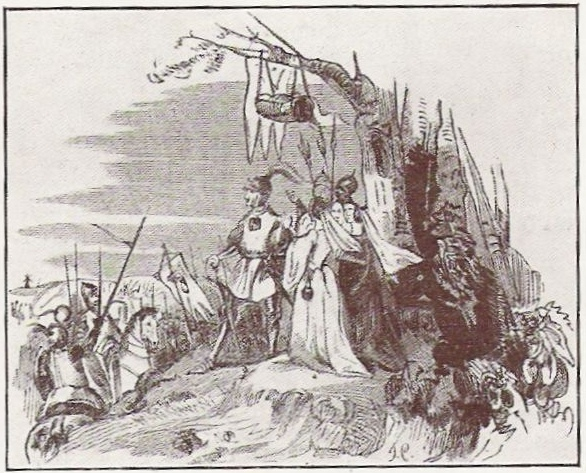
Godfrey III of Leuven in his cradle on the branch of an oak during the Battle of Ransbeek

There are several legends behind Manneken Pis, but the most famous is one involving Duke Godfrey III of Leuven. In 1142, the troops of this two-year-old lord were battling against the troops of the Berthouts, the lords of Grimbergen, in Ransbeek (now Neder-Over-Heembeek, a northern part of the City of Brussels). To give themselves courage, the soldiers placed the infant lord in a basket which they hung from a large oak tree overlooking the battlefield. While his men were in dire straits, the little duke rose up in the basket, and from his perch, urinated onto the troops of the Berthouts, who eventually lost the battle. The fountain perpetuates the memory of this victory. The name of the Rue du Chêne/Eikstraat ("Oak Tree Street"), at the corner of which the statue is located, recalls the famous tree.

- Another legend suggests that, in the 14th century, Brussels was under siege by a foreign power. The city had held its ground for some time, so the attackers conceived of a plan to place explosive charges at the city walls. A little boy named Julianske happened to be spying on them, as they were preparing. He urinated on the burning fuse and thus saved the city. There was, at the time (middle of the 15th century, perhaps as early as 1388), a similar statue made of stone. The statue was stolen several times.
- Another story tells of a wealthy merchant who, during a visit to the city with his family, had his beloved young son go missing. The merchant hastily formed a search party, which scoured all corners of the city, until the boy was found happily urinating in a small garden. The merchant, as a gift of gratitude to the locals who helped out during the search, had the fountain built.
- Another legend tells that a small boy went missing from his mother, when shopping in the centre of the city. The woman, panic-stricken by the loss of her child, called upon everyone she came across, including the mayor of the city. A citywide search began, and when at last the child was found, he was urinating on the corner of a small street. The story was passed down over time and the statue was erected as a tribute to the well-known legend.
- Another legend tells of the young boy who was awoken by a fire and was able to put out the fire with his urine. In the end, this helped stop the king's castle from burning down.

== Traditions ==
=== Costumes and wardrobe ===
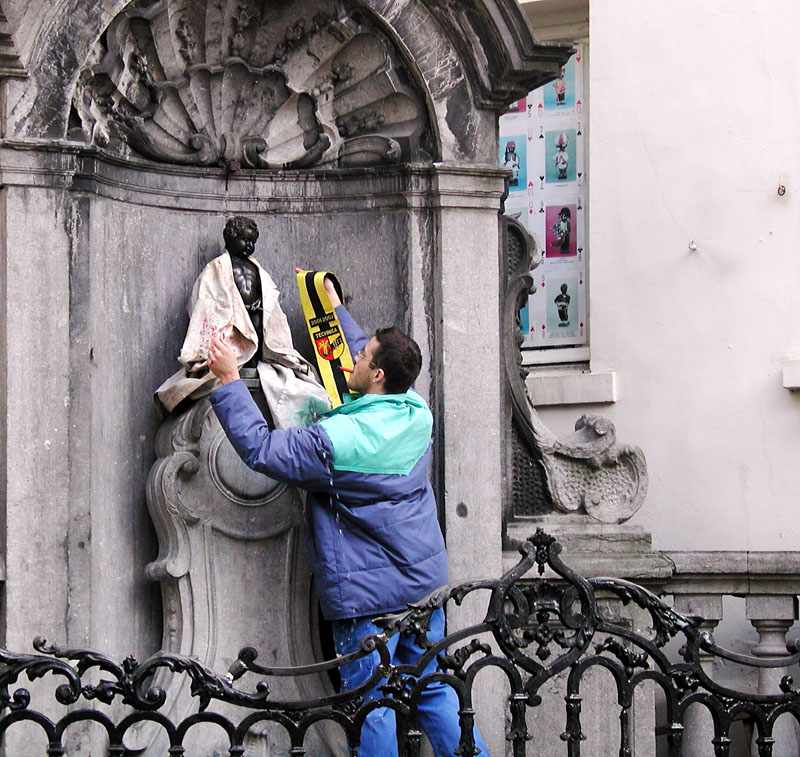
Manneken Pis being dressed by the Technica student's class of Erasmus Brussels University

Manneken Pis is dressed in costumes, several times each week, according to a published schedule, which is posted on the railings around the fountain. Since 1954, the costumes are managed by the non-profit organisation The Order of the Friends of Manneken Pis, who review hundreds of designs submitted each year, and select a small number to be produced and used. His wardrobe consists of around one thousand different costumes, many of which could previously be viewed in a permanent exhibition inside the Brussels City Museum, located on the Grand-Place, immediately opposite the Town Hall. In February 2017, a specially designed museum, called GardeRobe MannekenPis, opened its doors at 19, rue du Chêne/Eikstraat.

Although the proliferation of costumes is of 20th-century origin, their occasional use dates back almost to the date of casting. The oldest evidence of the tradition of dressing Manneken Pis dates from 1615; during the Ommegang of Brussels organised that year in honour of Archduchess Isabella, sovereign of the Spanish Netherlands, Manneken Pis was dressed in a shepherd's costume. He received his first costume on 1 May 1698 from the Governor of the Austrian Netherlands, Maximilian II Emanuel of Bavaria, during the festivities of one of the Guilds of Brussels. The oldest costume on display in the City Museum, the gentleman's gown offered by King Louis XV, is of 18th-century origin. In 1756, an inventory indicates that Manneken Pis had five complete costumes. From 1918 to 1940, he was offered some thirty costumes. But it was especially after 1945 that the movement took on an exceptional dimension; he had more than 400 costumes in 1994, more than 750 in 2005, and more than 950 in 2016. In 2018, Manneken Pis received his 1000th costume, created by fashion designer Jean-Paul Lespagnard.

The costume change on the figure is a colourful ceremony, often accompanied by brass band music. Many costumes represent the national dress of nations whose citizens come to Brussels as tourists; others are the uniforms of assorted trades, professions, associations, and branches of the civil and military services. As well as historical clothing, the wardrobe also contains modern costumes, such as ones of Dracula, Mickey Mouse and Santa Claus. In the past, the costume was cut without a cutting pattern. The sleeves were padded with cotton wool and ended with gloves. It is only since 1945 that a pattern allowed the making of more fitted costumes.

=== Folklore ===
The Order of the Friends of Manneken Pis was founded in 1954 and has more than 150 members. The objective of the Order is to stimulate the cultural, tourist, philanthropic and commercial development of Belgium in general, and more specifically to preserve the traditions linked to Manneken Pis. The Order is always present during the ceremonies surrounding the presentation of new costumes and during the statue's official greetings and anniversaries.

On certain folkloric occasions (e.g. Saint-Verhaegen, Meyboom plantation), Manneken Pis is hooked up to a keg of beer. Cups are filled up with the beer flowing from the statue and given out to passers-by.

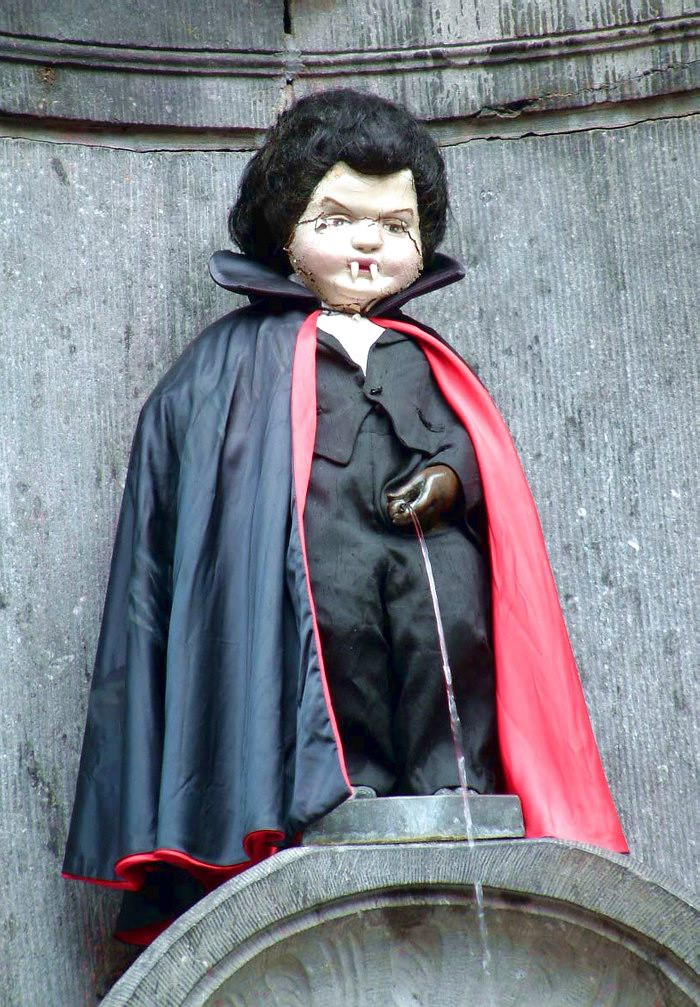
Manneken Pis dressed as Dracula (15 March 2002)

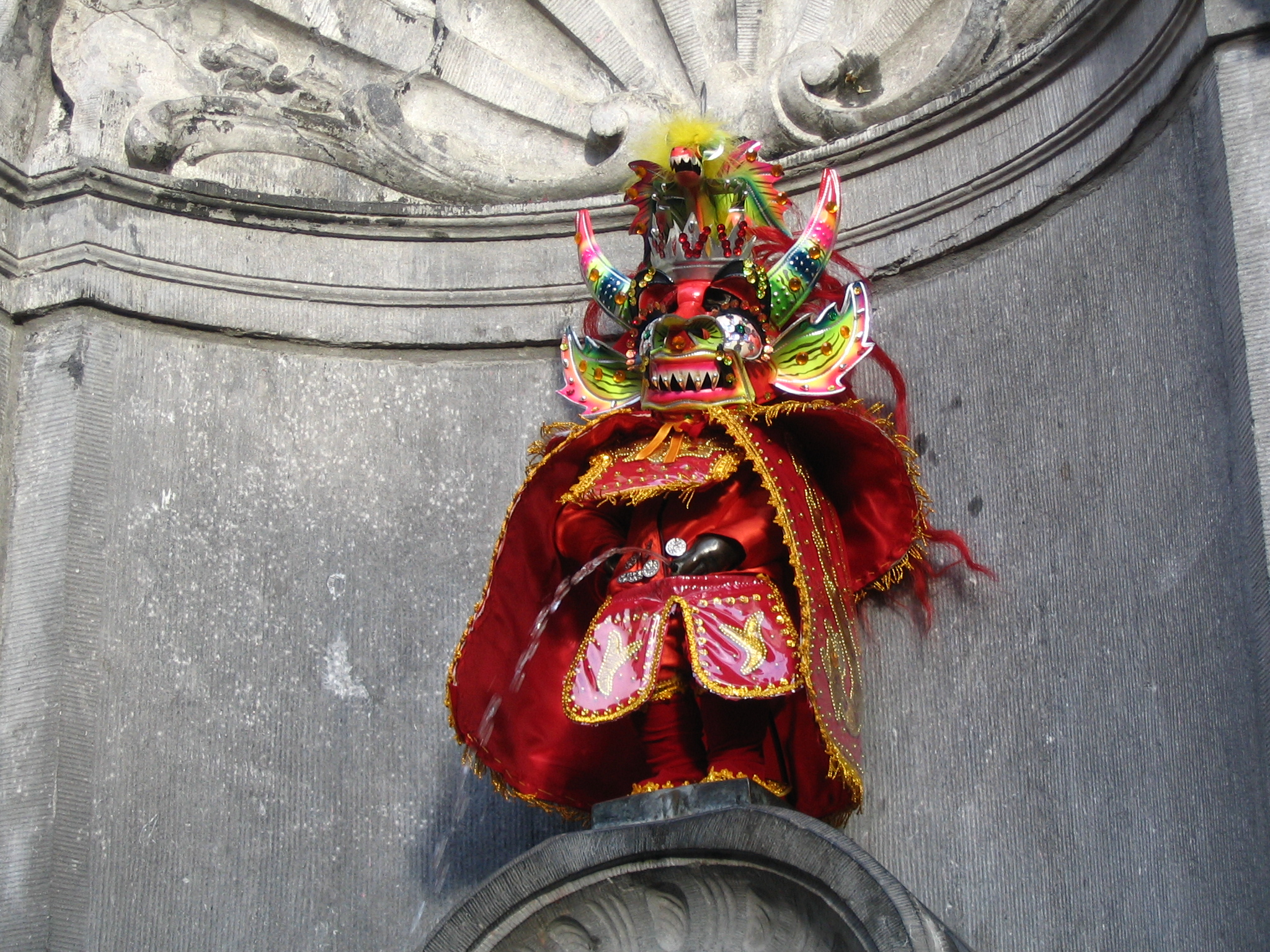
Manneken Pis in Diablada (Bolivia) (786th costume, 3 March 2007)

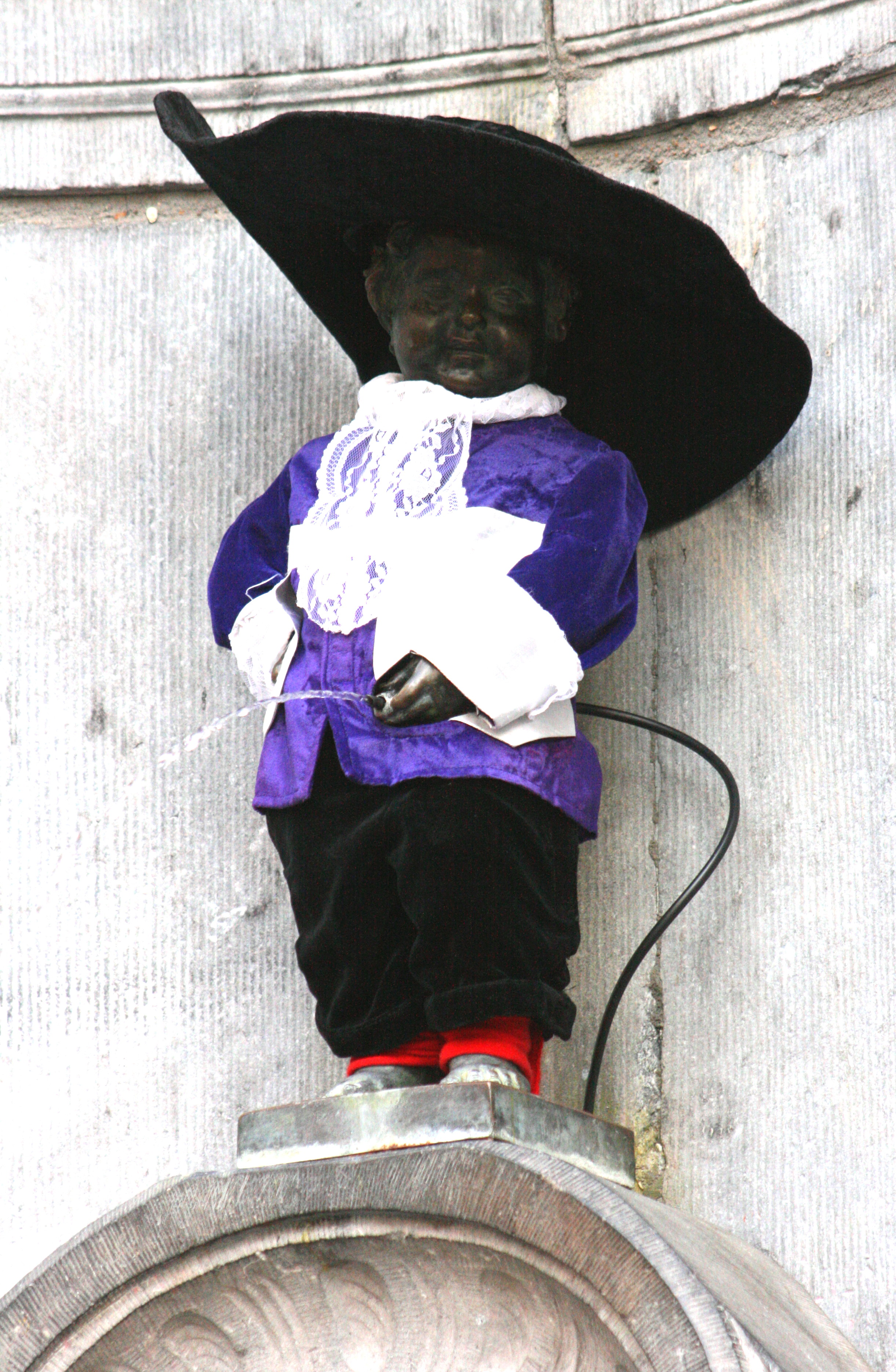
Replica of the outfit offered by Maximilien Emanuel of Bavaria in 1698 (17 October 2009)

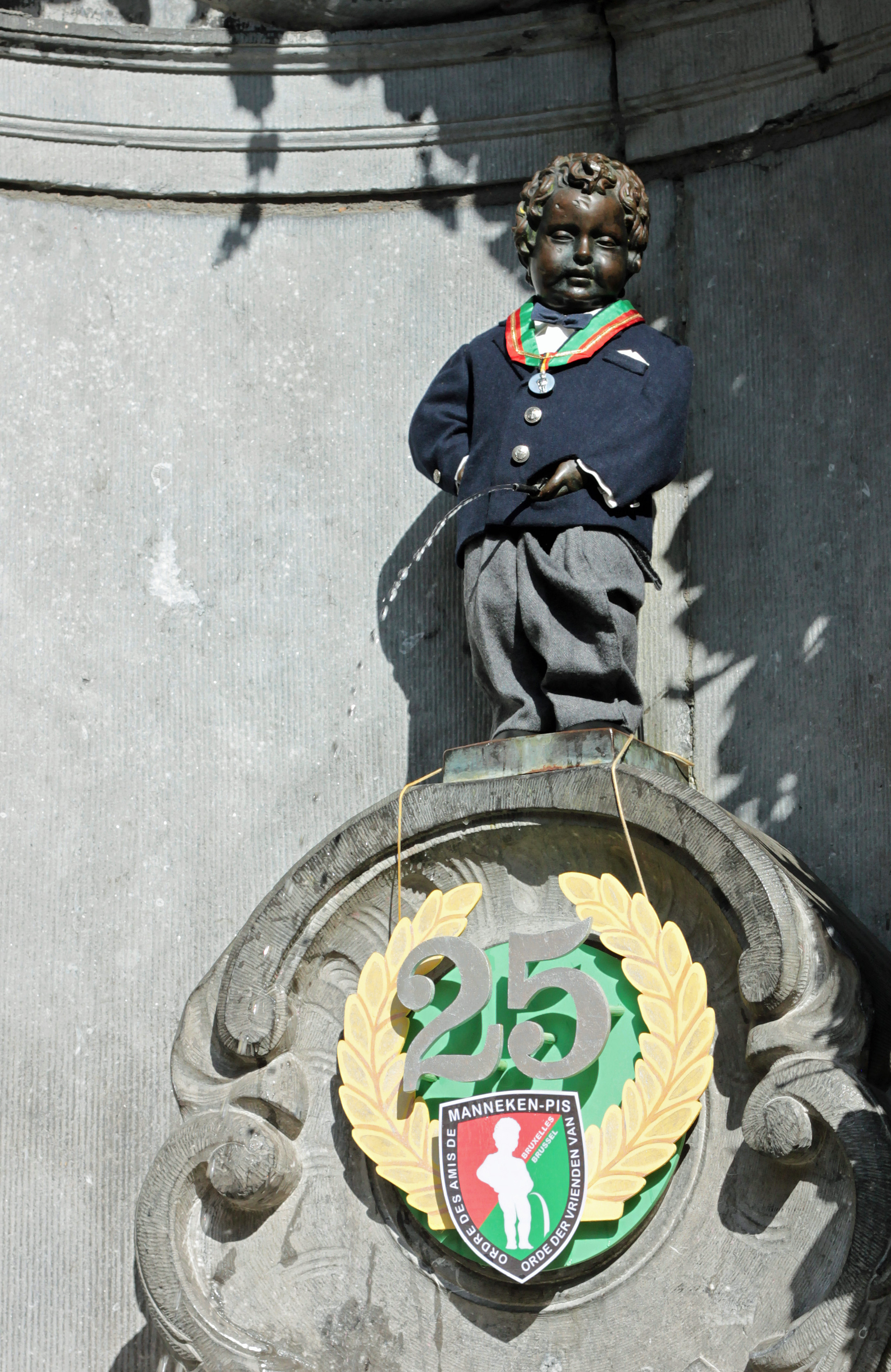
25th anniversary of the Order of the Friends of Manneken Pis (3 September 2011)

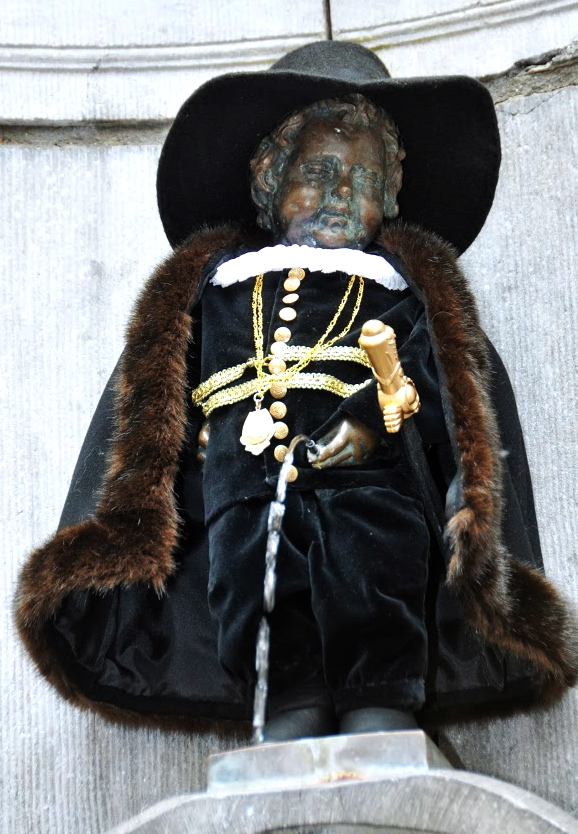
Manneken Pis dressed as a burgomaster from the Seven Noble Houses of Brussels (902nd costume, 22 June 2013 (Note: This costume was gifted by the Association des Descendants des Lignages de Bruxelles.)

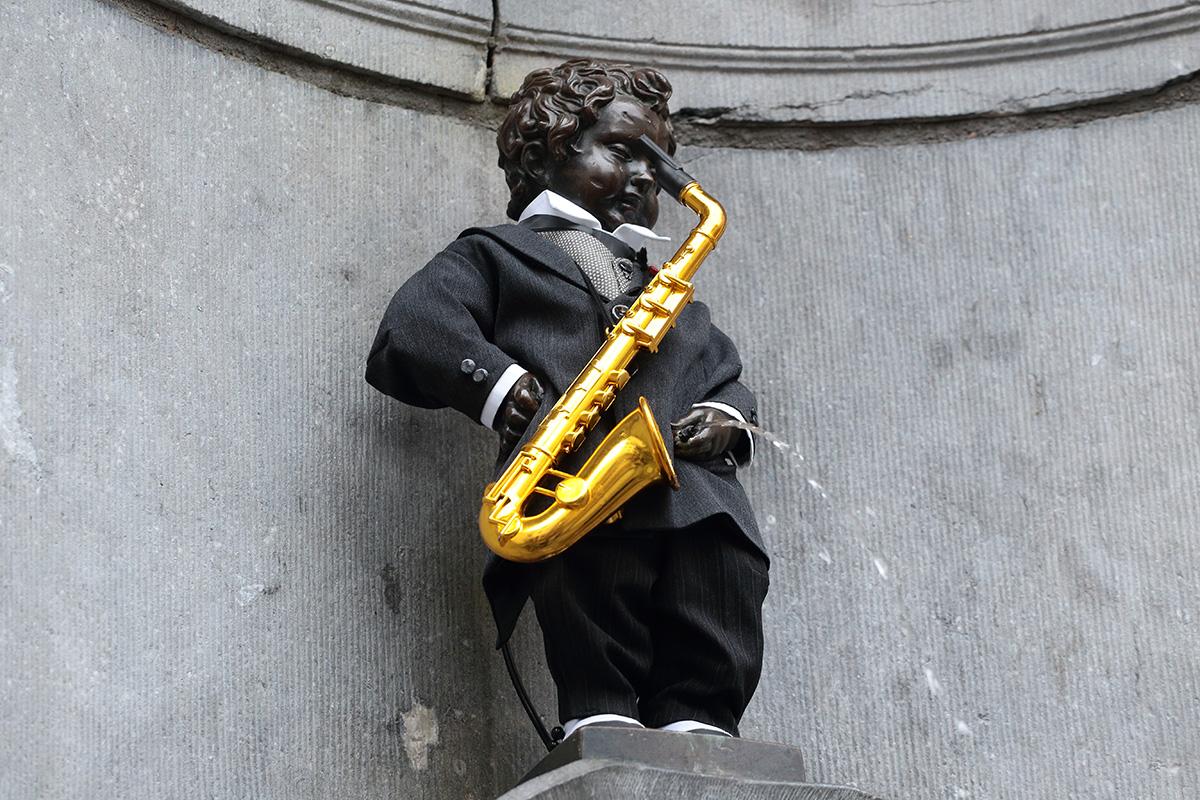
A saxophone for Manneken Pis on the 200th birthday of Adolphe Sax (6 November 2014)

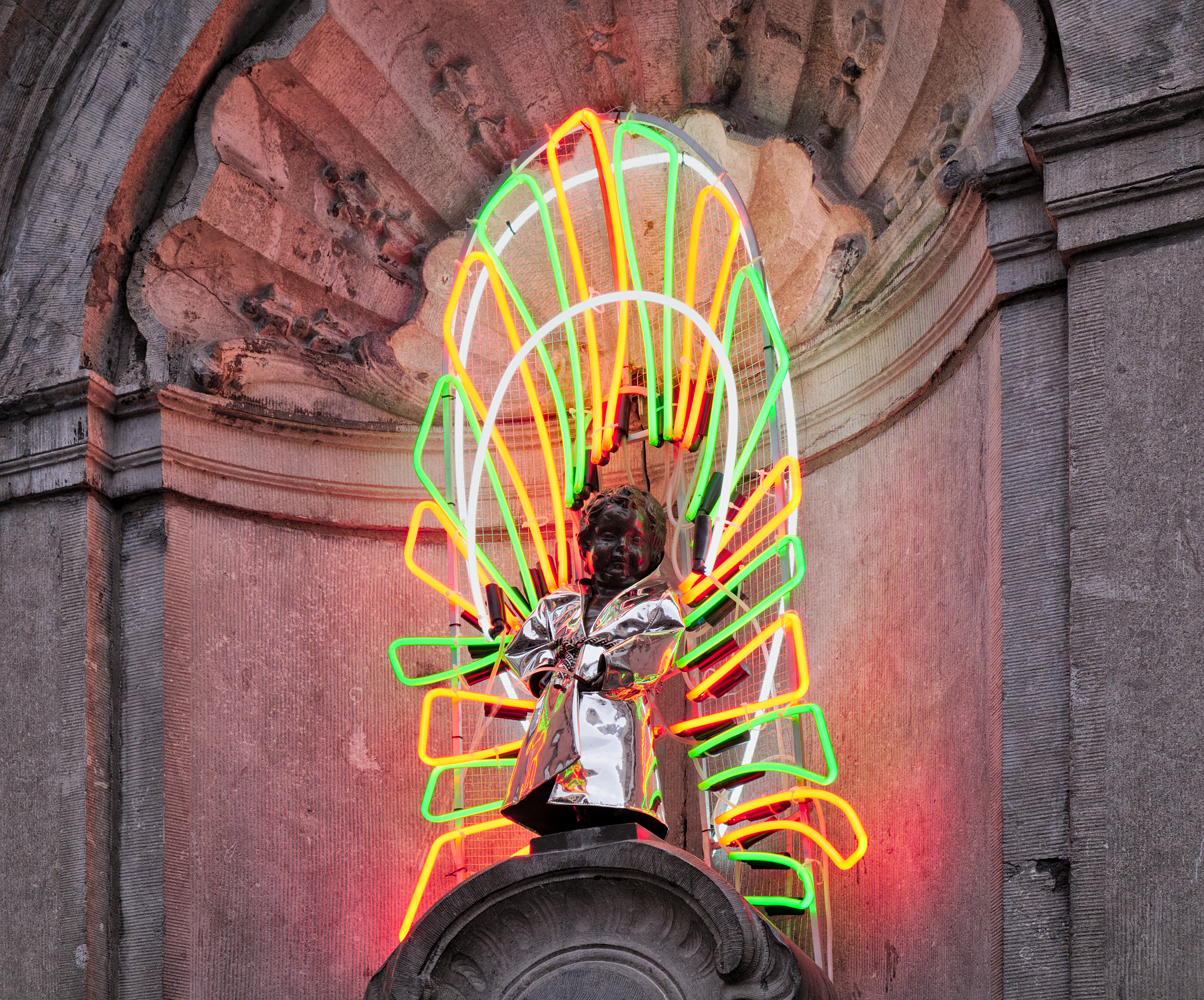
Manneken Pis in his 1000th costume, designed by Jean-Paul Lespagnard (13 May 2018)

== Copies and imitations ==
=== In Belgium ===
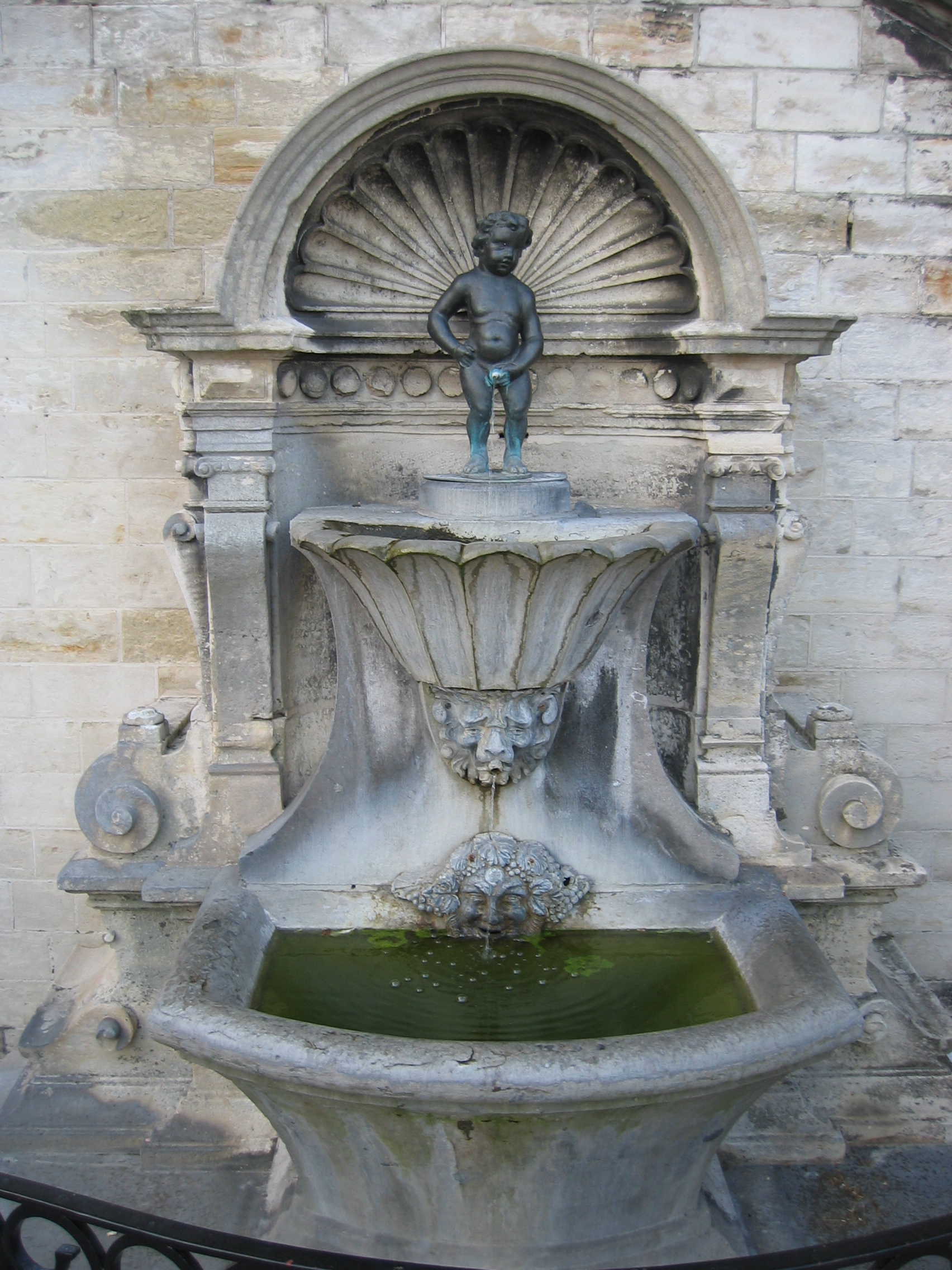
Geraardsbergen's Manneken Pis competes with that of Brussels as the oldest.

Although Brussels' Manneken Pis is the best known, others exist all across the country. As early as the 17th century, the statue was the subject of decorative replicas. The Brussels City Museum exhibits a copy which was crafted by Jacques Van den Broeck in 1630, probably from a cast of Duquesnoy's statue. Another local copy, from 1636, in a private American collection, is attributed to the German founder Daniel Haneman. Similar statues can also be found in the Flemish cities of Koksijde, Hasselt, Ghent, and Bruges, as well as in the Walloon municipality of Braine-l'Alleud (where it is called El Gamin qui piche, meaning "The Peeing Kid" in Walloon).

==== Feud with Geraardsbergen ====
There is an ongoing dispute over which Manneken Pis is the oldest; the one in Brussels or the one in Geraardsbergen. According to tradition, Geraardsbergen was in a rebuilding phase after the devastating passage of Jean II de Croÿ's troops in the spring of 1452, during a war opposing the city of Ghent and the Burgundian duke Philip the Good. On that occasion, the spout from one of the city's fountains, in the shape of a copper lion's head, was taken by the people of Ghent. The aldermen of Geraardsbergen thus had their own Manneken Pis made in 1459 to replace it. The statue was cast in brass by Reinier Van Tienen, based on a model designed by Gillis Vander Jeught.

It can be assumed that the first version of Brussels' Manneken Pis, dating from before 1451, served as inspiration to Geraardsbergen's statue. Looking at the ages of the statues, both of them are replicas; the one in Brussels dating from 1965 and the one in Geraardsbergen from 1985. The design of Geraarsbergen's original statue, however, which dates from 1459, antedates that of Duquesnoy's statue, from 1619. It is on this basis that Geraardsbergen asserts that its Manneken Pis is the oldest, but since there was probably already a Manneken Pis in 1452 in Brussels, the tradition might be slightly older there.

=== Internationally ===
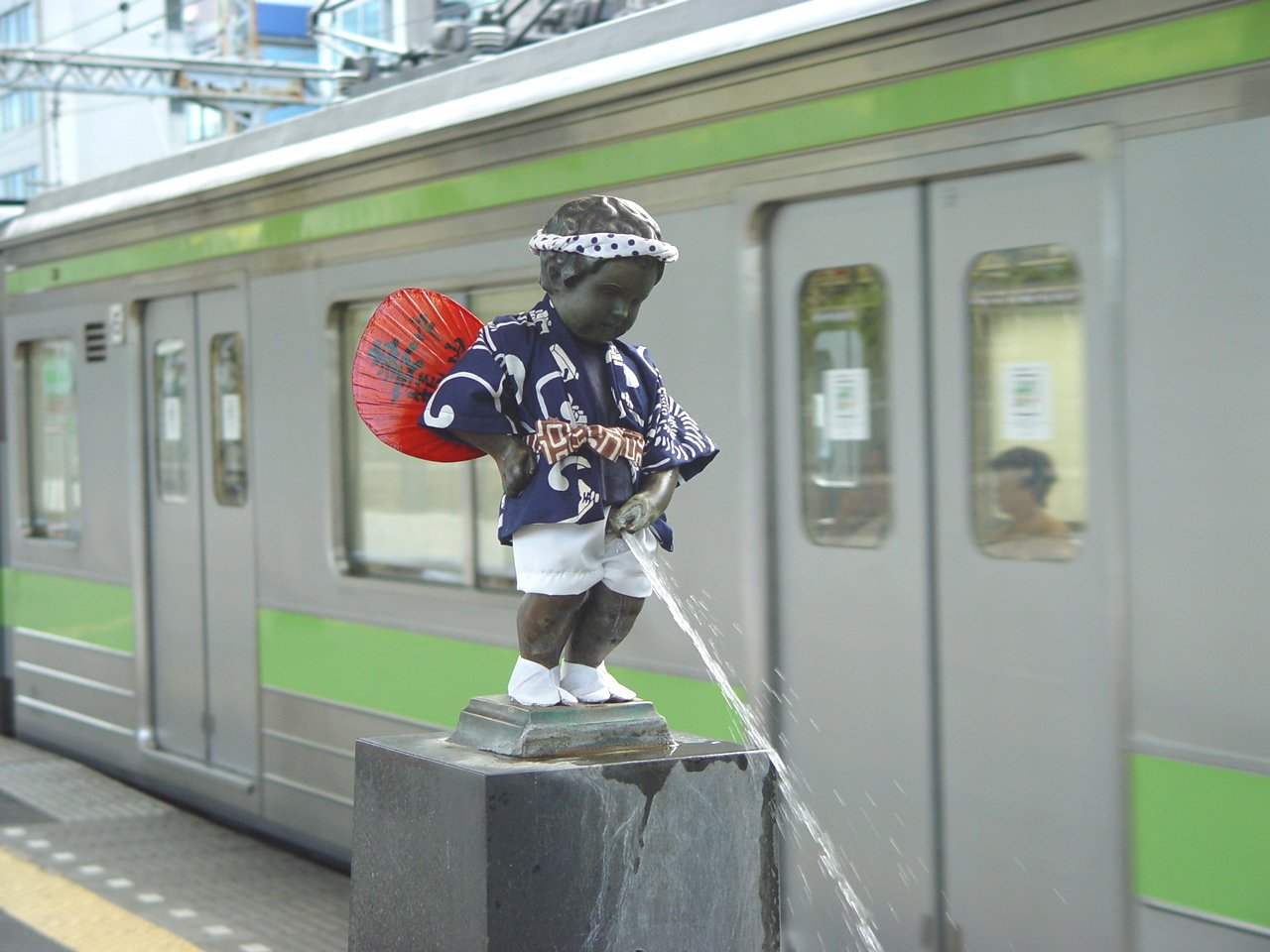
A Japanese variant of Manneken Pis on the platform of Tokyo's Hamamatsuchō Station

Since the 20th century, numerous copies or imitations of Manneken Pis have been created abroad. It is necessary to distinguish the official copies offered by the City of Brussels from copies and imitations carried out privately by admirers of the little statue. Official copies were offered to: Colmar, France (1922); Osaka, Japan (1928); Monaco (1951); London, United Kingdom (1959); Broxeele, France (1979); Benalmadena, Spain (1991); and Nagoya, Japan (2015).

A replica of Manneken Pis has pride of place in the lobby of the police station of Poitiers, France, commemorating the fact that this city was, for 26 days, the seat of the Belgian government during World War II. Similar copies of the statue exist in the Bulgarian city of Stara Zagora, in the Danish town of Bogense, as well as in Chiayi Park in Taiwan. Another working replica stands on the platform of Tokyo's Hamamatsuchō Station. There, the statue is dressed in various costumes —traditional and otherwise— by station workers at different times of year.

In September 2002, a Belgian-born waffle-maker set up a replica in front of his waffle stand in the Orlando Fashion Square mall, in Orlando, Florida. He recalled the legend as "the boy who saved Brussels from fire by extinguishing it with his urine" (perhaps confusing the legend with an incident in Gulliver's Travels). Some shocked shoppers made a formal complaint. Mall officials said that the waffle-shop owner did not follow procedures when he put up the statue and was therefore in violation of his lease.

In contrast, there is a 1-metre-tall (3.3 ft) similar statue known as Manequinho in Rio de Janeiro, Brazil, made in 1908. It used to be in front of the National Library, but after complaints about immorality, it was moved to the headquarters of Botafogo de Futebol e Regatas, a famous Brazilian football club, where it has been adopted as a mascot by the club. Fans usually dress it with the club's jersey after important wins.

== Similar statues ==
=== Jeanneke Pis ===
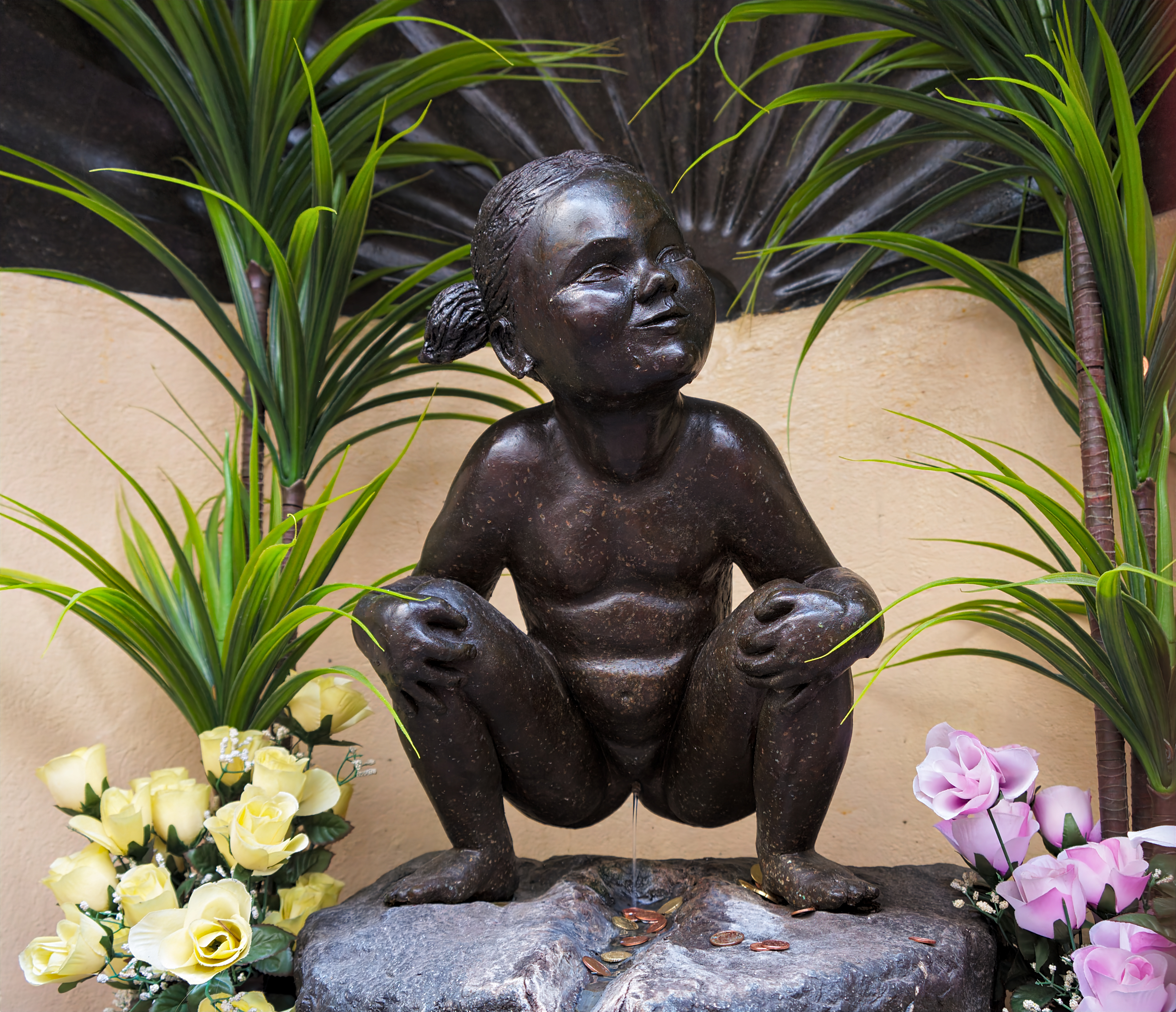
Jeanneke Pis

Manneken Pis is not the only peeing statue in Brussels. Since 1987, it has had a female equivalent, Jeanneke Pis ("Little Pissing Joan"), located on the eastern side of the Impasse de la Fidélité/Getrouwheidsgang ("Fidelity Alley"), a narrow cul-de-sac some 30 metres (100 ft) long leading northwards off the restaurant-packed Rue des Bouchers/Beenhouwersstraat, in central Brussels. The 50-centimetre (20 in) bronze sculpture depicts a naked little girl with short pigtails, squatting and urinating on a blue-grey limestone base. It feeds a small fountain and is now protected from vandalism by iron bars.

=== Het Zinneke ===
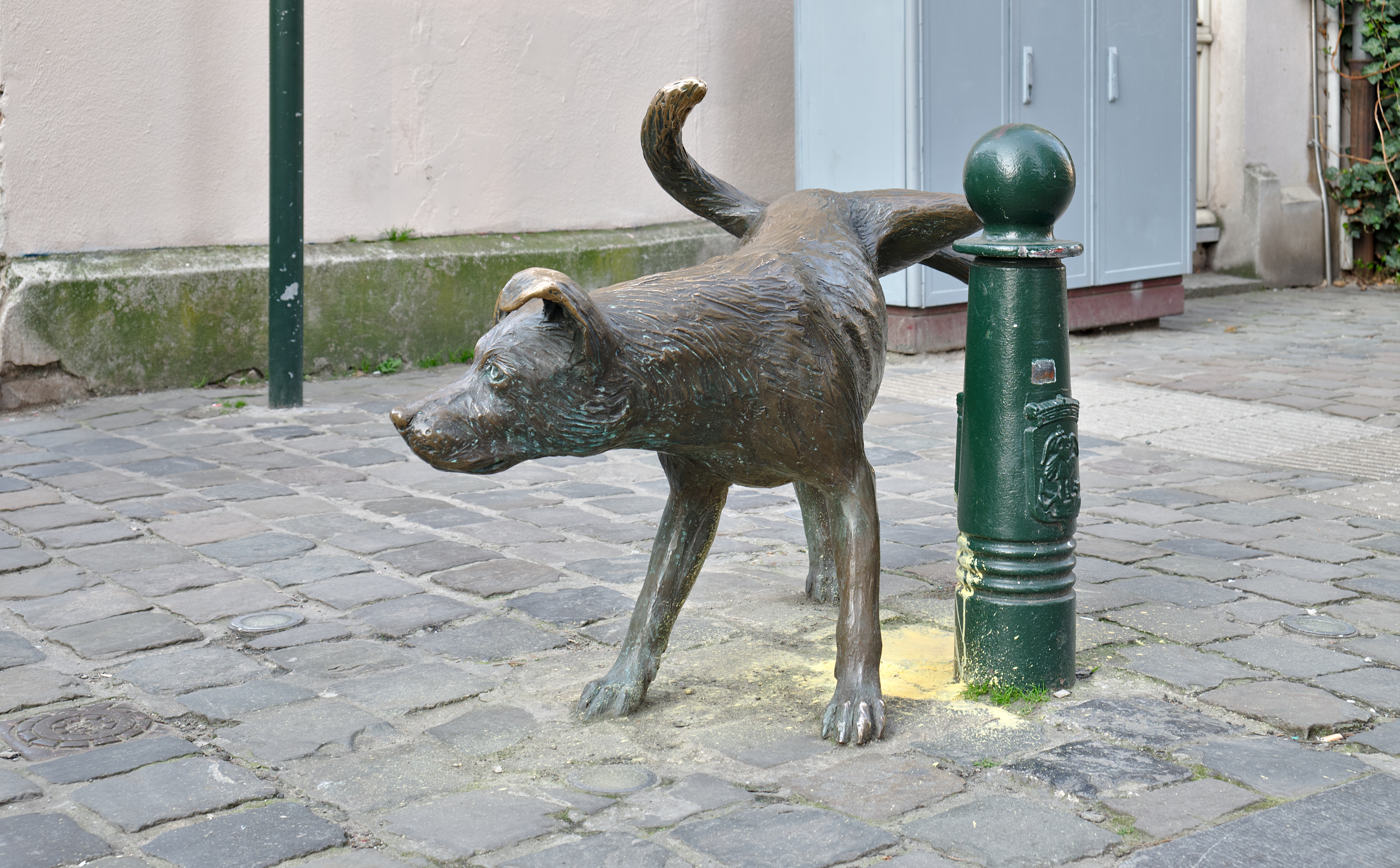
Het Zinneke

Het Zinneke, sometimes called Zinneke Pis, another bronze sculpture in central Brussels, depicting a dog urinating against a bollard, can also be seen as a reference to Manneken Pis. It is, however, not associated with a fountain. Zinneke is a nickname chosen to represent a person from Brussels who was not born there. The word means "mutt" or "bastard" in the Brusselian dialect, and originally referred to the city's stray dogs that hung around the streets by the Lesser Senne (a tangent canal of the river Senne, which circumnavigated Brussels along the city walls) until the end of the 19th century. It is located at the junction of the Rue des Chartreux/Kartuizersstraat and the Rue du Vieux-Marché-aux-Grains/Oude Graanmarkt, not far from the Halles Saint-Géry/Sint-Gorikshallen.

== In popular culture ==
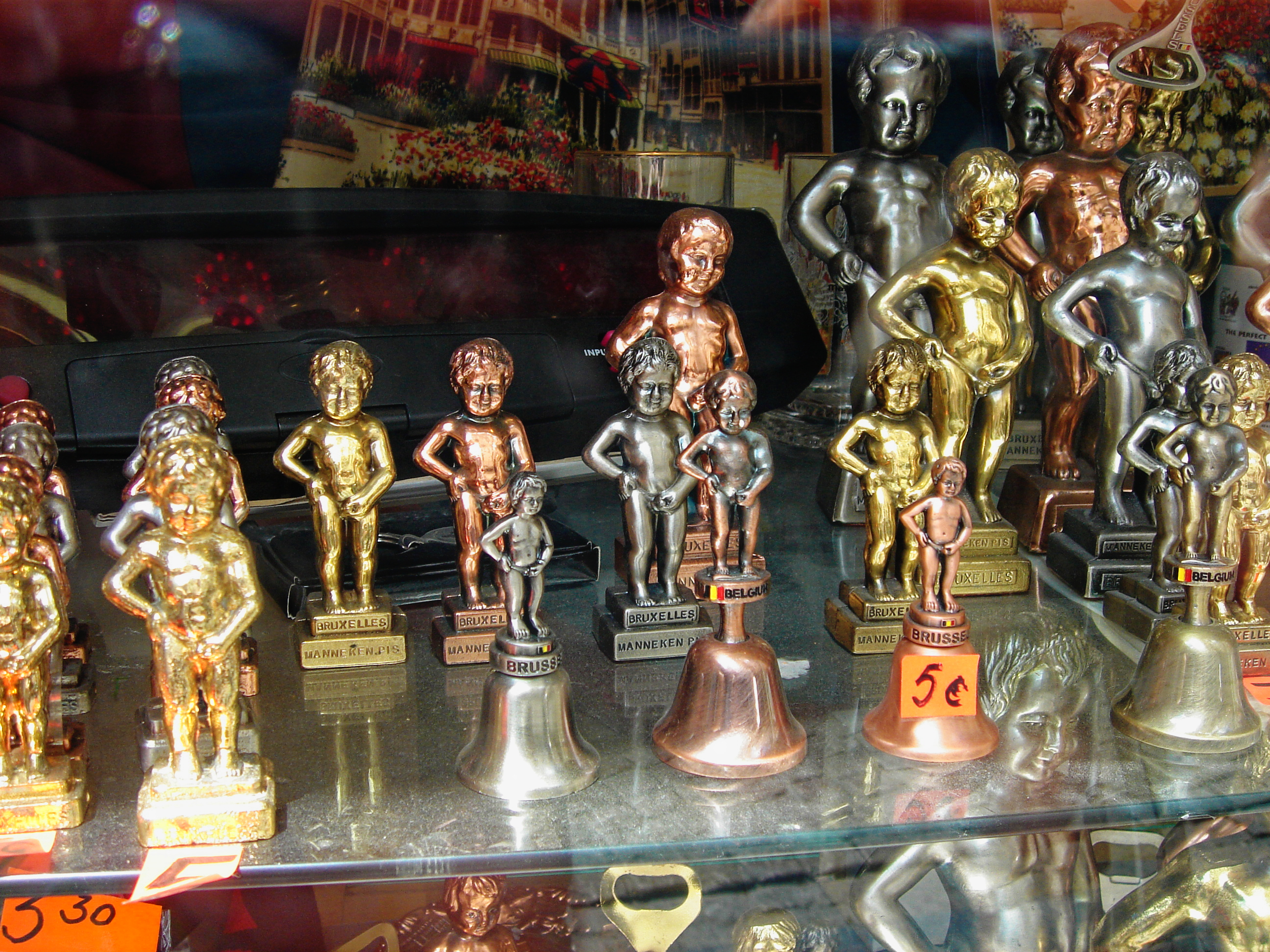
Souvenir figurines of Manneken Pis sold on the Rue de l'Étuve/Stoofstraat

Due to its prominent symbolic nature in relation to Brussels and Belgium in general, Manneken Pis is widely used to represent both the city and country (as well as its people) in advertising, branding, tourism, and as a national personification. The statue's self-derisive nature also embodies the typical Belgian identity, referred to as belgitude (French; lit. 'Belgianness'), as well as a type of folk humour specific to Brussels, known as zwanze in the Brusselian dialect.

Surrounded by souvenir shops, the fountain has become a major tourist attraction. Figurine-sized replicas of Manneken Pis made of brass, fibreglass, or even Belgian chocolate, are commonly sold there. The statue has also been adapted into risqué souvenir items such as ashtrays and corkscrews.

=== Use in campaigns ===
In 2001, the Irish low-cost airline Ryanair used an image of Manneken Pis in an advertisement targeting the Belgian national airline Sabena, with the slogan "Pissed off with Sabena's high fares?" Sabena sued Ryanair, claiming the comparison was misleading, and Ryanair was ordered to apologise. Their apology read "We're Sooooo Sorry Sabena!" and listed further price comparisons. Sabena went bankrupt later in 2001.

In June 2025, Manneken Pis was temporarily turned off to mark World Continence Week. This was part of an initiative by the Belgian charity PlasPraat vzw and the Dutch charity Bekkenbodem4all to raise awareness about incontinence, and to break down the stigma around people discussing the issue with medical professionals.

== See also ==
- List of depictions of urine in art
- Sculpture in Brussels
- History of Brussels
- Belgium in the long nineteenth century
