= Delirium Café =

Bar in Brussels, Belgium

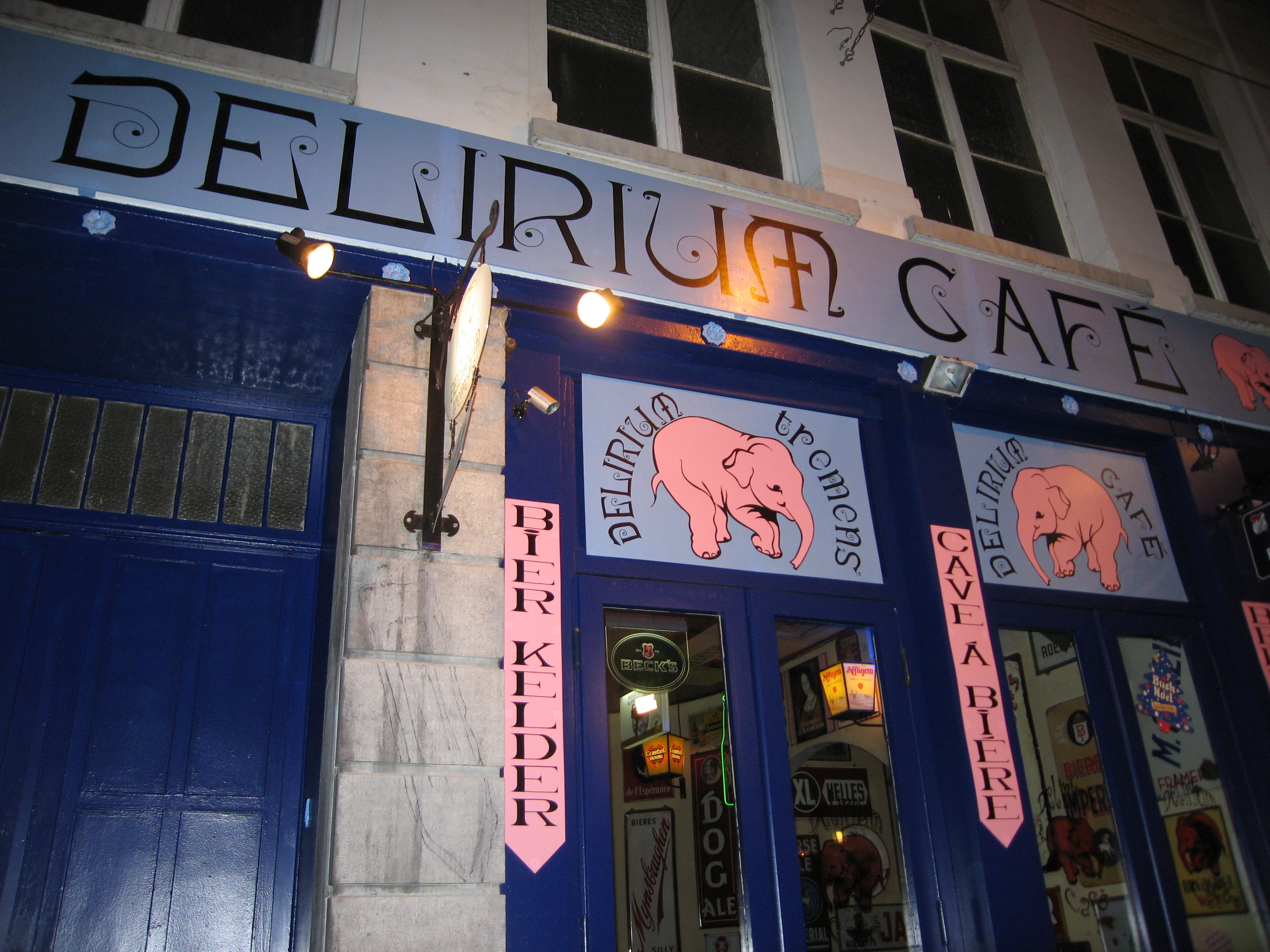
- Delirium Café
- Interactive map of the Delirium Café area

General information
- Type: Pub
- Location: Impasse de la Fidélité / Getrouwheidsgang, 1000 City of Brussels, Brussels-Capital Region, Belgium
- Coordinates: 50°50′54.27″N 4°21′14.16″E

Website
- delirium.be/en

Delirium Café is a bar in Brussels, Belgium, known for its long beer list, standing at 2,004 brands in January 2004 as recorded in the Guinness Book of Records. On offer are beers from over 60 countries, including many Belgian beers. The bar's name comes from the beer Delirium Tremens (produced by the Huyghe family brewery), the pink elephant symbol of which also decorates the bar's entrance.

The bar is located in a small alley called the Impasse de la Fidélité/Getrouwheidsgang ("Fidelity Alley"), only a couple of hundred metres from the Grand-Place/Grote Markt (Brussels' main square). The Jeanneke Pis statue is across the street from the entrance.

== History ==
The establishment was founded in December 2003 by Joël Pêcheur, Fabienne Charles and Jean De Laet. A month later, it was listed in the Guinness Book of Records as the establishment offering the most different brands of beer in the world (in this case 2004, imported from over 60 countries). By the mid-2000s, the bar was selling 1,500 hl of beer a year.

Delirium Café has been expanded internationally, opening 26 franchises as of 2024, including in Rio de Janeiro (2010), Tokyo (2011), São Paulo (2014), Lisbon (2017), Toulouse and Reims (dates unknown), Leesburg (2017), Strasbourg (2017), and Kuala Lumpur (2018).

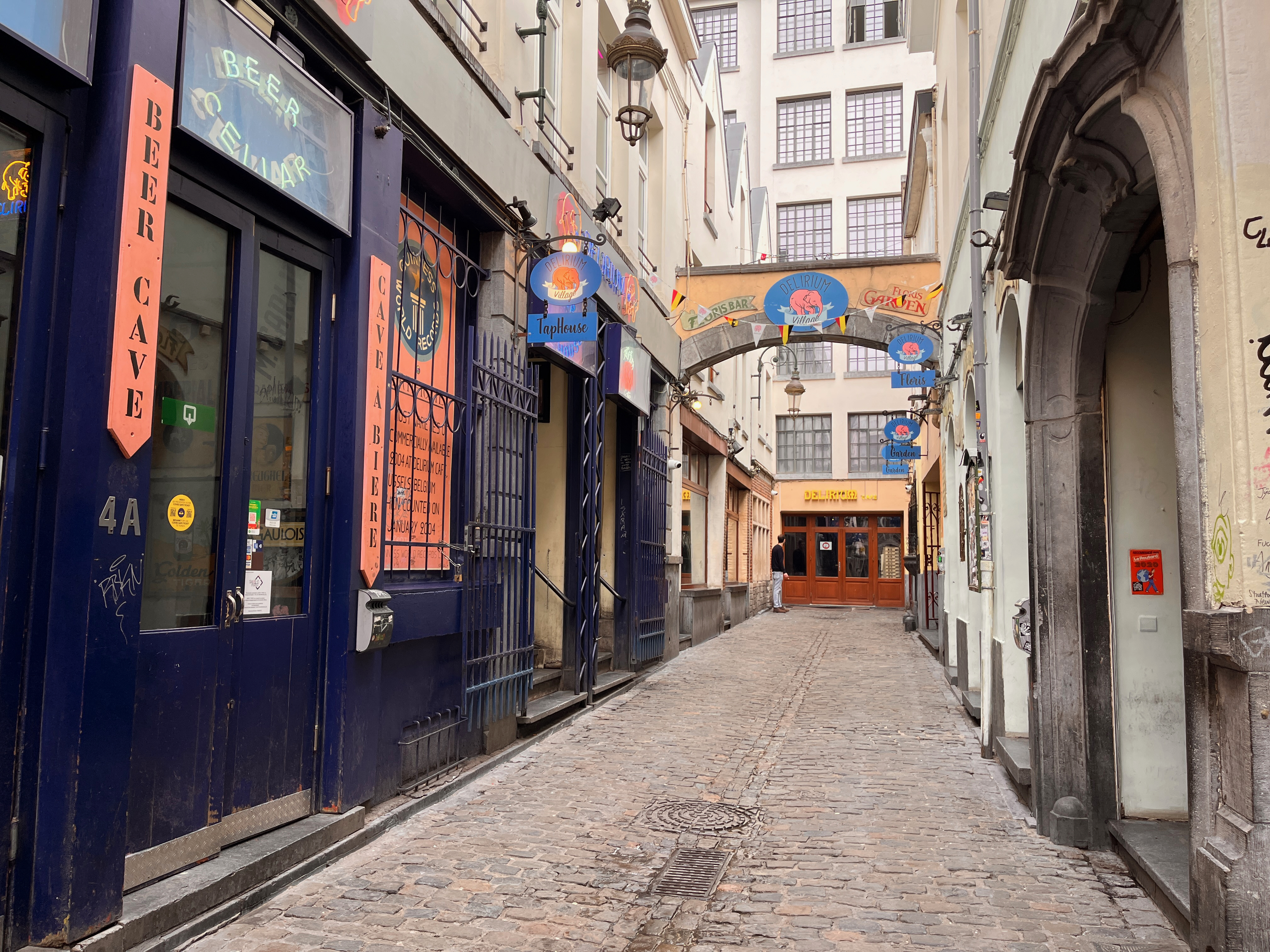
Location (on the left) in the Impasse de la Fidélité/Getrouwheidsgang

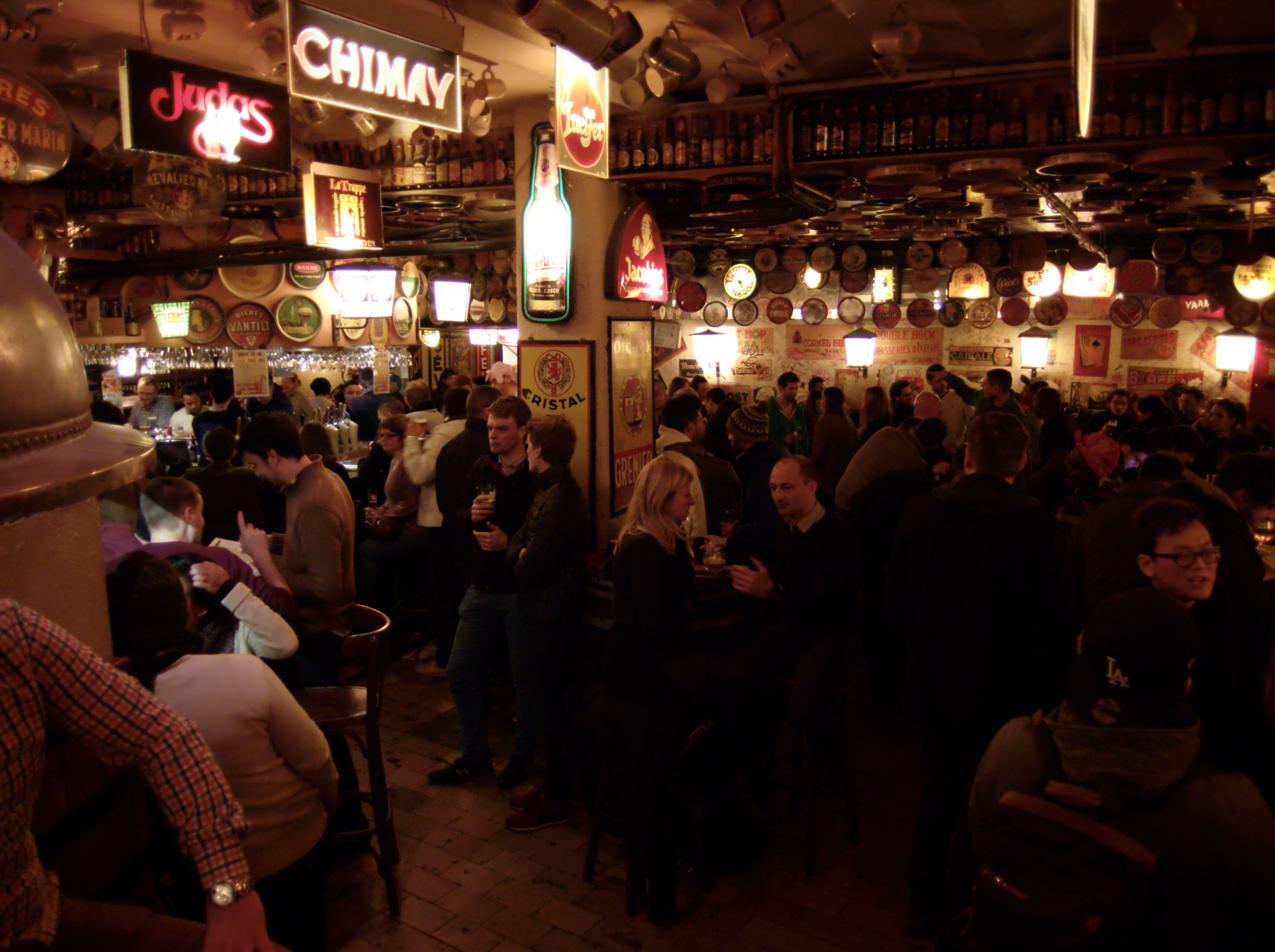
Interior of the café on a busy weekday night

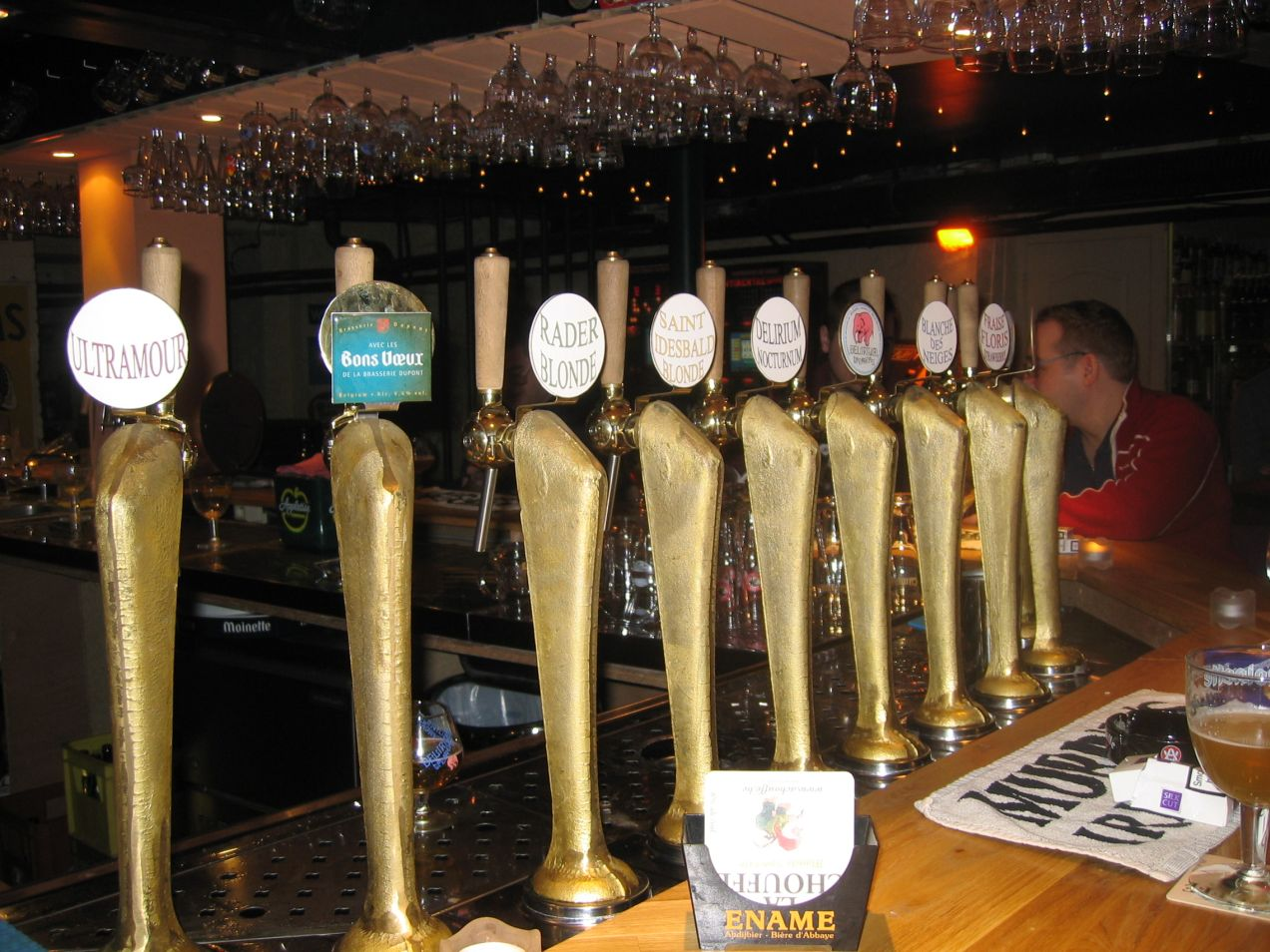
Beer taps serving some of the most popular brands
