= Tom Frantzen =

Belgian sculptor (born 1954)

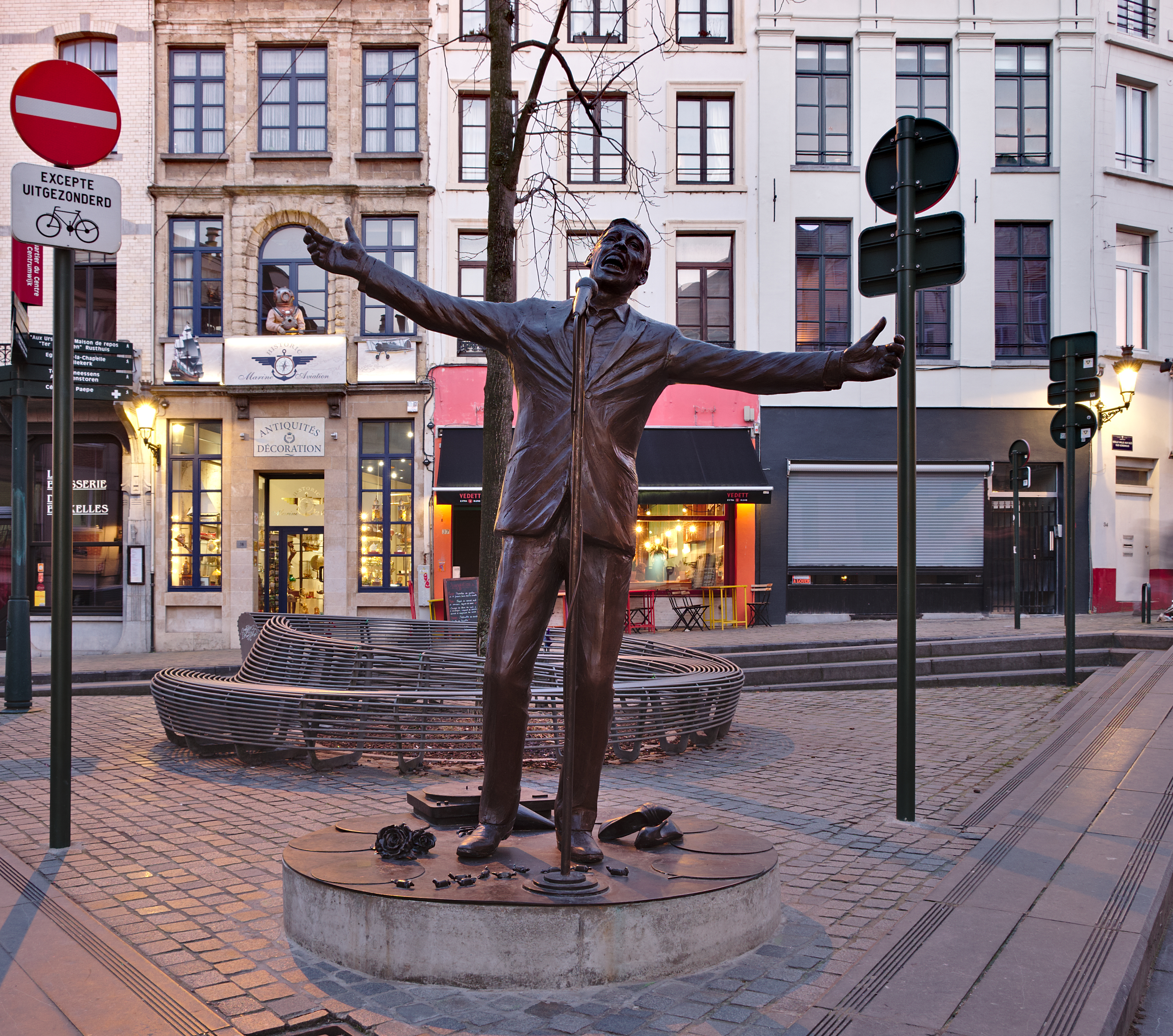
L'Envol in Brussels by Tom Frantzen

Tom Frantzen (born 1954) is a Belgian sculptor, known for his street images.

== Biography ==
Frantzen was born in 1954 in Brussels and studied at the National School of Architecture and Visual Arts, La Cambre. In 1977 he built his own foundry. He made study tours in France, Germany, Italy and the United States. Until 1990 he cast his images himself; since then he has contracted this work out.

== Main works ==
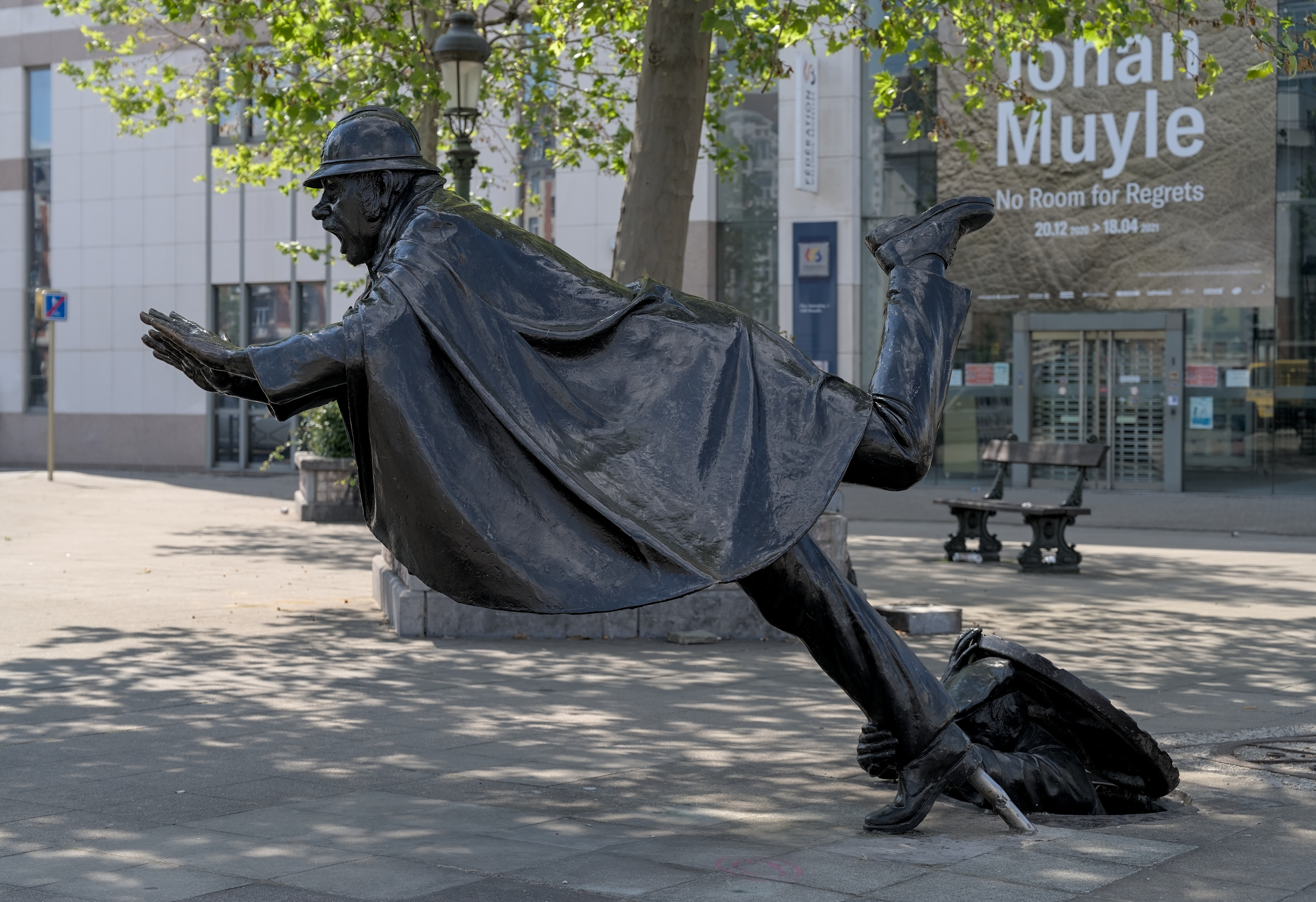
Vaartkapoen (1985)

- Vaartkapoen, Brussels, 1985
- Het Zinneke, Brussels, 1998
- Madame chapeau, Brussels, 2000
- De renaissance van de droom van Icarus, Steenokkerzeel, 2007
- De acrobaten, Berchem, 2012
- Bruegelbeeld, Brussels, 2015
- L'Envol, a statue depicting Jacques Brel, Brussels, 2017
- Ode aan het Verzet, Fort Breendonk, 2021
