= Broxeele =

- Commune
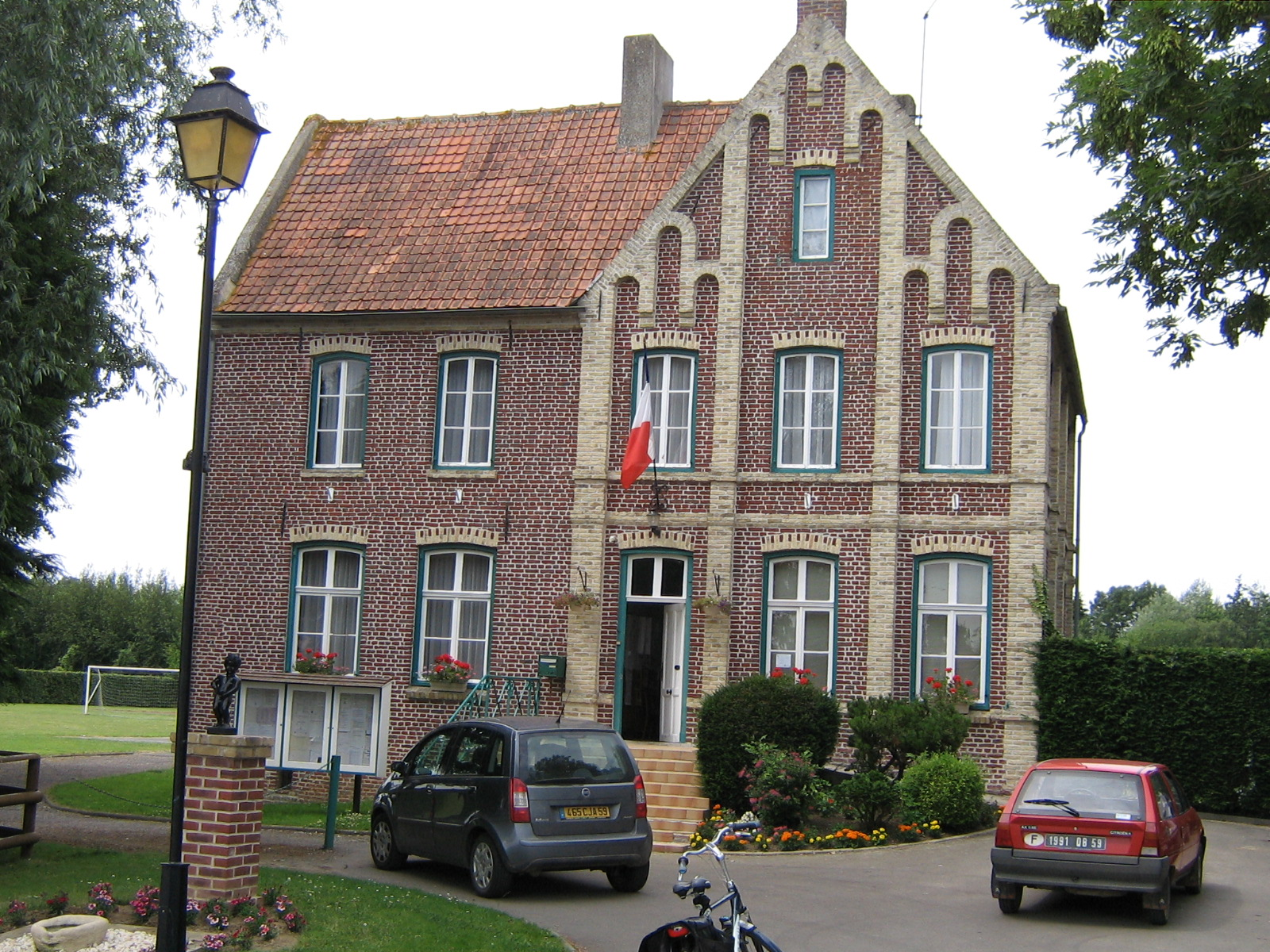
- The town hall in Broxeele

- Coat of arms
- Location of Broxeele
- Location within France Location within Hauts-de-France
- Coordinates: 50°49′51″N 2°19′20″E
- Country: France
- Region: Hauts-de-France
- Department: Nord
- Arrondissement: Dunkerque
- Canton: Wormhout
- Intercommunality: Hauts de Flandre

Government
  - Mayor (2020–2026): Vincent Pauwels
- Area^{1}: 3.77 km^{2} (1.46 sq mi)
- Elevation: 26 m (85 ft)
- Highest elevation: 30 m (98 ft)
- Lowest elevation: 23 m (75 ft)
- Population (2023): 425
  - Density: 113/km^{2} (292/sq mi)
- Time zone: UTC+01:00 (CET)
  - Summer (DST): UTC+02:00 (CEST)
- INSEE/Postal code: 59111 /59470
- ^{1} French Land Register data, which excludes lakes, ponds, glaciers > 1 km^{2} (0.386 sq mi or 247 acres) and river estuaries.

Broxeele (French pronunciation: [bʁɔksɛl]; Dutch: Broksele) is a commune in the Nord department in northern France.

It is 20 km (12 mi) south of Dunkirk and also 20 km (12 mi) west of the Belgian border.

== Name ==
The name is derived from the Dutch Broec sele (modern name: Broksele), which means "house (with one room) in the marsh" (in 1072: Brocsela). The name Brussels has exactly the same etymology.

== Population ==
Historical population
Year	Pop.	±% p.a.
1968	209	—
1975	190	−1.35%
1982	211	+1.51%
1990	270	+3.13%
1999	269	−0.04%
2007	305	+1.58%
2012	304	−0.07%
2017	403	+5.80%
2023	425	+0.89%
Source: INSEE

== International relations ==
Broxeele and Brussels are sister cities and the city of Brussels has given a replica of Manneken Pis to Broxeele.

== Heraldry ==
Arms of Broxeele	The arms of Broxeele are blazoned : Gules, a lion argent armed and langued Or. (Broxeele and Rubrouck use the same arms.)

== See also ==
- Communes of the Nord department
