= Eric Everard =

- Born: 10 July 1964 (age 62); Uccle, Brussels
- Education: Catholic University of Louvain
- Occupations: CEO and founder of Easyfairs Group

Eric Everard is the CEO and Founder of the Brussels-based company Easyfairs, which is currently ranked by AMR International as the world's 18th largest exhibition organizer. In 2018 Easyfairs was named as Belgium's Enterprise of the Year. The award was presented by Belgium's Prime Minister at a special ceremony on 15 October 2018. In addition to organising events, the company manages exhibition venues in Belgium, Sweden and the Netherlands. The newest of these, Åbymässan, was opened near Gothenburg in February 2019.

== Biography ==
As a student Everard founded the magazine Univers-Cité in 1986. Two years later he co-founded his first exhibition, Salon de l’Etudiant (the Student Fair) in Belgium, extending it to other European countries with the launch of the Erasmus Programme.

In 1997 Everard founded Artexis, organizer of the fine art fair, Art Brussels, which takes place at Tour & Taxis, and the European antiques exhibition, Eurantica, which takes place annually at Brussels Expo and was acquired by Artexis in [...]

In 2001, Everard took on directorships at The Best of Group s.a., the exhibition halls in Antwerp and the Palais des Expositions in Namur. Everard founded Easyfairs in 2003. The Artexis brand was retired in 2017.

Everard became the serving President of UFI (Union des Foires Internationales - the Global Association of the Exhibition Industry) at its 77th Congress in Singapore on 12 November 2010, having been selected at the Zagreb congress a year earlier. His term as president ended in November 2011. Everard is also a board member of Fortis Bank.

Everard was presented with the "Manager de l'Année 2012" award by Belgian Prime Minister Elio Di Rupo in a ceremony at Brussels Expo on 9 January 2013.
