= L'Envol (statue) =

Sculpture in Brussels, Belgium

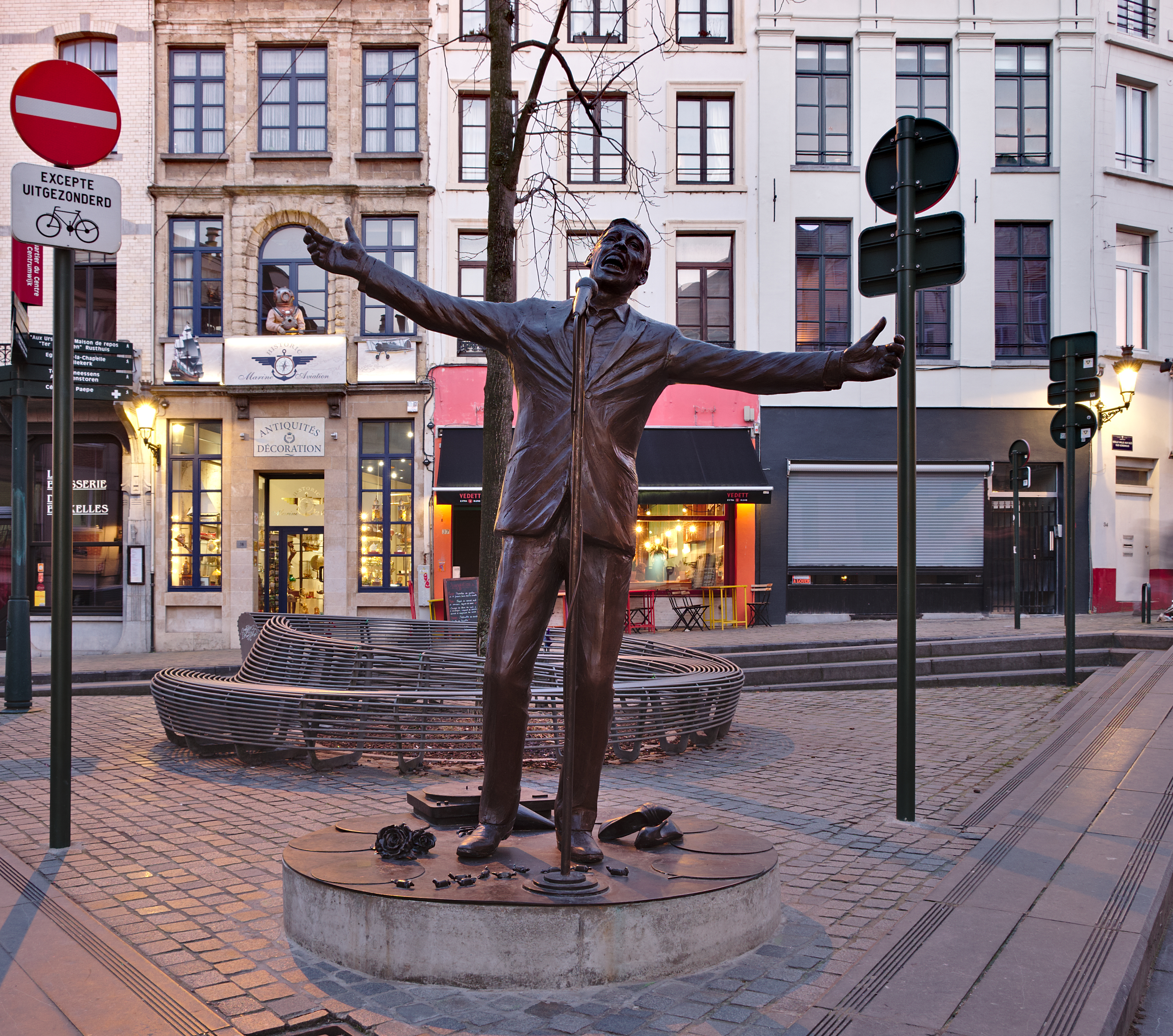
- Location within Brussels
- Artist: Tom Frantzen
- Year: 2017
- Type: Bronze
- Location: Brussels, Belgium
- 50°50′39″N 4°21′07″E

L'Envol (The Flight) is a bronze statue of Belgian singer Jacques Brel, sculpted by Tom Frantzen. It was inaugurated on the Place de la Vieille Halle aux Blés/Oud Korenhuisplein in Brussels, Belgium, on 11 October 2017.

== Statue ==
The statue depicts Jacques Brel singing in front of a microphone, whilst opening his arms in passion. It is located in the same street as the Brel Foundation. The title L'Envol (The Flight) refers to the line "Mille fois je pris mon envol" ("A thousand times I took my flight") from Brel's song La Chanson des Vieux Amants.

== Inauguration ==
The statue was revealed to the public on 11 October 2017 in the presence of Marion Lemestre, Councilor for Economic Affairs of the City of Brussels.
