= Flemish people =

Ethnic group native to Belgium

Flemings
Vlamingen (Dutch)
- Flag of Flanders, the symbol of the Flemish people.

- Flemish Community in Belgium and Europe

Total population
- c. 7 million (2011 estimate)

Regions with significant populations
- Belgium (Flanders): 6,450,765
- United States: Indeterminable^{[a]} (352,630 Belgians)
- France: 187,750
- Canada: 13,840–176,615^{[b]}
- South Africa: 55,200
- Australia: 15,130
- Brazil: 6,000

Languages
- Dutch (East Flemish, West Flemish, Brabantian); Limburgish; Flemish Sign Language

Religion
- Predominantly and historically Roman Catholic with Protestant minority (Note: Mainly in the Reformed tradition, although also a scarce population of Lutherans.); Increasingly irreligious

Related ethnic groups
- Dutch, Walloons, Afrikaners, Vilamovians, Germans,
- ^a U.S. population census does not differentiate between Walloons and Flemish, therefore the number of the latter is unknown.^b In 2011, 13,840 respondents stated Flemish ethnic origin. Another 176,615 reported Belgian. See List of Canadians by ethnicity

- Person: Fleming (Vlaming)
- People: Flemings (Vlamingen)
- Language: Flemish (Vlaams), VGT (Vlaamse Gebarentaal)
- Country: Flanders (Vlaanderen)

Flemish people or Flemings (Dutch: Vlamingen [ˈvlaːmɪŋə(n)]; French: Flamands) are the Dutch-speaking inhabitants of Flanders. They constitute the largest linguistic and cultural community in Belgium, accounting for about 60% of the country's population.

Flemish was historically a geographical term, as all inhabitants of the medieval County of Flanders in modern-day Belgium, France and the Netherlands were referred to as "Flemings" irrespective of their ethnicity or language. The contemporary region of Flanders comprises a part of this historical county, as well as parts of the medieval Duchy of Brabant and the medieval County of Loon, where the modern national identity and culture gradually formed.

== History ==
The sense of "Flemish" identity increased significantly after the Belgian Revolution. Prior to this, the term "Vlamingen" in the Dutch language was in first place used for the inhabitants of the former County of Flanders. Flemish, however, had been used since the 14th century to refer to the language and dialects of both the peoples of Flanders and the Duchy of Brabant.

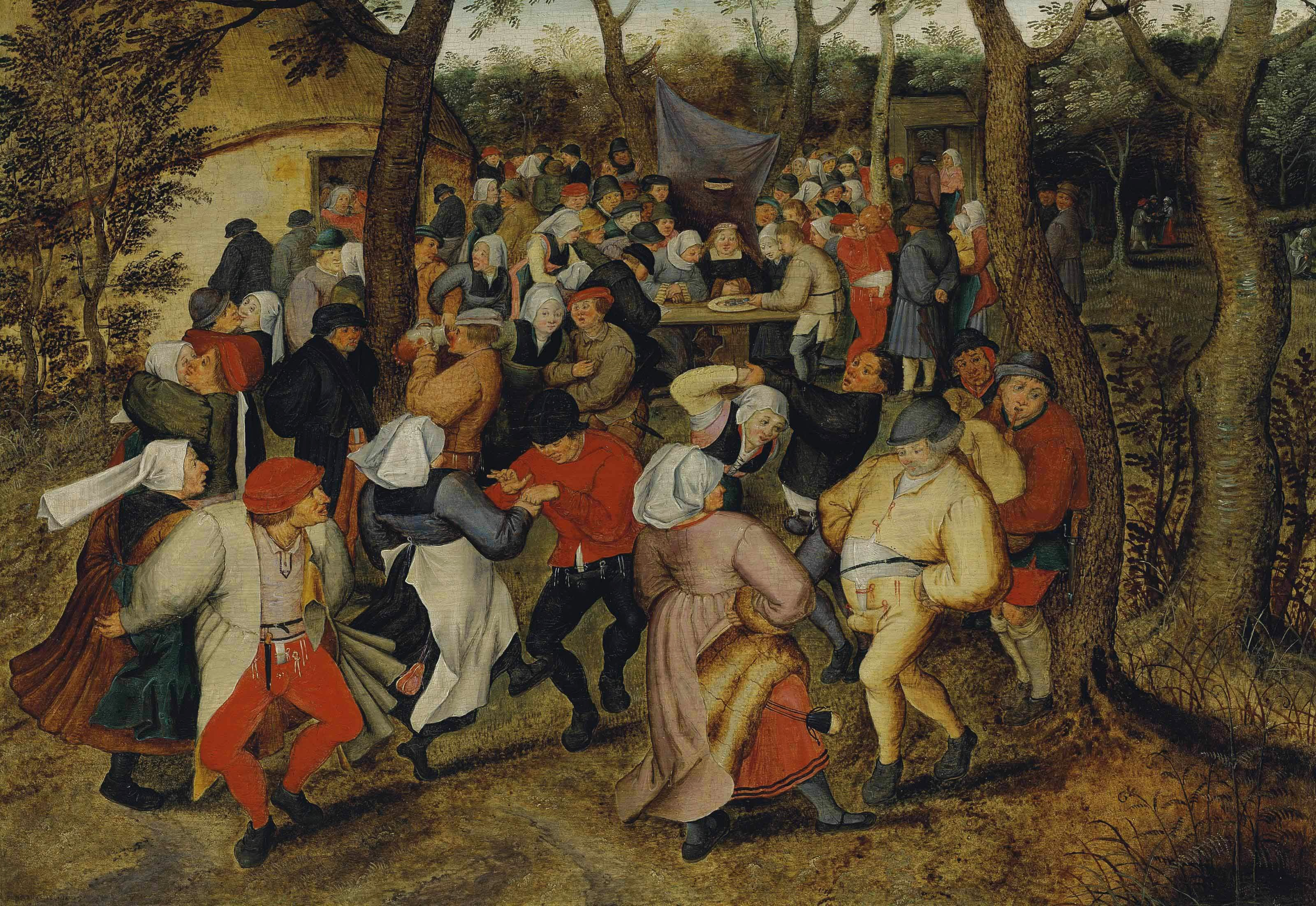
The Wedding Dance by Pieter Brueghel the Younger, 1625

In 1830, the southern provinces of the United Netherlands proclaimed their independence. French-dialect speaking population, as well as the administration and elites, feared the loss of their status and autonomy under Dutch rule while the rapid industrialization in the south highlighted economic differences between the two. Under French rule (1794–1815), French was enforced as the only official language in public life, resulting in a Francization of the elites and, to a lesser extent, the middle classes. The Dutch king allowed the use of both Dutch and French dialects as administrative languages in the Flemish provinces. He also enacted laws to reestablish Dutch in schools. The language policy was not the only cause of the secession; the Roman Catholic majority viewed the sovereign, the Protestant William I, with suspicion and were heavily stirred by the Roman Catholic Church which suspected William of wanting to enforce Protestantism. Lastly, Belgian liberals were dissatisfied with William for his allegedly despotic behaviour.

Following the revolt, the language reforms of 1823 were the first Dutch laws to be abolished and the subsequent years would see a number of laws restricting the use of the Dutch language. This policy led to the gradual emergence of the Flemish Movement, that was built on earlier anti-French feelings of injustice, as expressed in writings (for example by the late 18th-century writer, Jan Verlooy) which criticized the Southern Francophile elites. The efforts of this movement during the following 150 years, have to no small extent facilitated the creation of the de jure social, political and linguistic equality of Dutch from the end of the 19th century.

After the Hundred Years War many Flemings migrated to the Azores. By 1490 there were 2,000 Flemings living in the Azores. Willem van der Haegen was the original sea captain who brought settlers from Flanders to the Azores. Today many Azoreans trace their genealogy from present day Flanders. Many of their customs and traditions are distinctively Flemish in nature such as windmills used for grain, São Jorge cheese and several religious events such as the imperios and the feast of the Cult of the Holy Spirit.

== Identity and culture ==
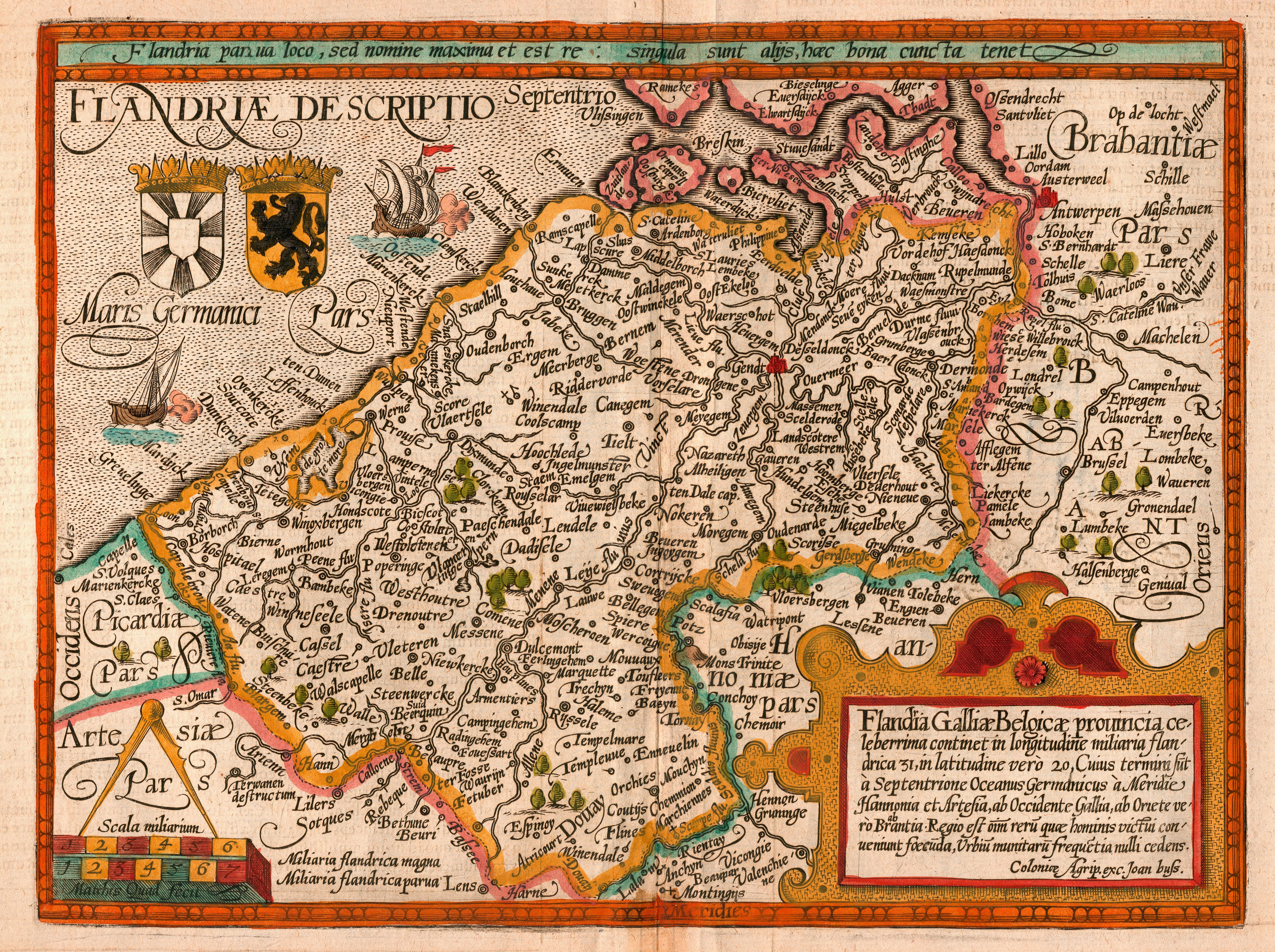
Map of the medieval County of Flanders

Within Belgium, Flemings form a clearly distinguishable group set apart by their language and customs. Various cultural and linguistic customs are similar to those of the Southern part of the Netherlands. Generally, Flemings do not identify themselves as being Dutch and vice versa.

There are popular stereotypes in the Netherlands as well as Flanders which are mostly based on the 'cultural extremes' of both Northern and Southern culture. Alongside this overarching political and social affiliation, there also exists a strong tendency towards regionalism, in which individuals greatly identify themselves culturally through their native province, city, region or dialect they speak.

=== Language ===
Flemings speak Dutch (specifically its southern variant, which is often colloquially called 'Flemish'). It is the majority language in Belgium, being spoken natively by three-fifths of the population. Its various dialects contain a number of lexical and a few grammatical features which distinguish them from the standard language. As in the Netherlands, the pronunciation of Standard Dutch is affected by the native dialect of the speaker. At the same time East Flemish forms a continuum with both Brabantic and West Flemish. Standard Dutch is primarily based on the Hollandic dialect (spoken in the northwestern Netherlands) and to a lesser extent on Brabantic, which is the most dominant Dutch dialect of the Southern Netherlands and Flanders.

=== Religion ===
Approximately 75% of the Flemish people are by baptism assumed Roman Catholic; however, a still-diminishing minority of less than 8% attends Mass on a regular basis and nearly half of the inhabitants of Flanders are agnostic or atheist. A 2006 inquiry in Flanders showed 55% chose to call themselves religious and 36% believe that God created the universe.

=== National symbols ===
The official flag and coat of arms of the Flemish Community represents a black lion with red claws and tongue on a yellow field (or a lion rampant sable armed and langued gules). A flag with a completely black lion had been in wide use before 1991 when the current version was officially adopted by the Flemish Community. That older flag was at times recognized by government sources (alongside the version with red claws and tongue). Today, only the flag bearing a lion with red claws and tongue is recognized by Belgian law, while the flag with the all-black lion is mostly used by Flemish separatist movements. The Flemish authorities also use two logos of a highly stylized black lion which show the claws and tongue in either red or black. The first documented use of the Flemish lion was on the seal of Philip d'Alsace, count of Flanders of 1162. As of that date the use of the Flemish coat of arms (or a lion rampant sable) remained in use throughout the reigns of the d'Alsace, Flanders (2nd) and Dampierre dynasties of counts. The motto "Vlaanderen de Leeuw" (Flanders the lion) was allegedly present on the arms of Pieter de Coninck at the Battle of the Golden Spurs on July 11, 1302. After the acquisition of Flanders by the Burgundian dukes the lion was only used in escutcheons. It was only after the creation of the United Kingdom of the Netherlands that the coat of arms (surmounted by a chief bearing the Royal Arms of the Netherlands) once again became the official symbol of the new province East Flanders.

== Diaspora ==
=== Canada ===
The first sizeable wave of Flemish migration to Canada occurred in the 1870s, when Saint Boniface proved a popular destination for work in local flour mills, brick yards and railway yards. Similarly, Flemish were drawn to smaller villages in Manitoba, where jobs in farming were available. In the early 20th century, Flemish settled in significant numbers across Ontario, particularly attracted by the tobacco-growing industry, in the towns of Chatham, Leamington, Tillsonburg, Wallaceburg, Simcoe, Sarnia and Port Hope.

=== France and the Netherlands ===
The original County of Flanders encompassed areas which today belong to France and the Netherlands, but are still host to people of Flemish descent and some continued use of Flemish Dutch. Namely, these are Zeelandic Flanders and the Arrondissement of Dunkirk (historically known as French Westhoek). The people of North Brabant also share related ancestry.

=== Poland ===
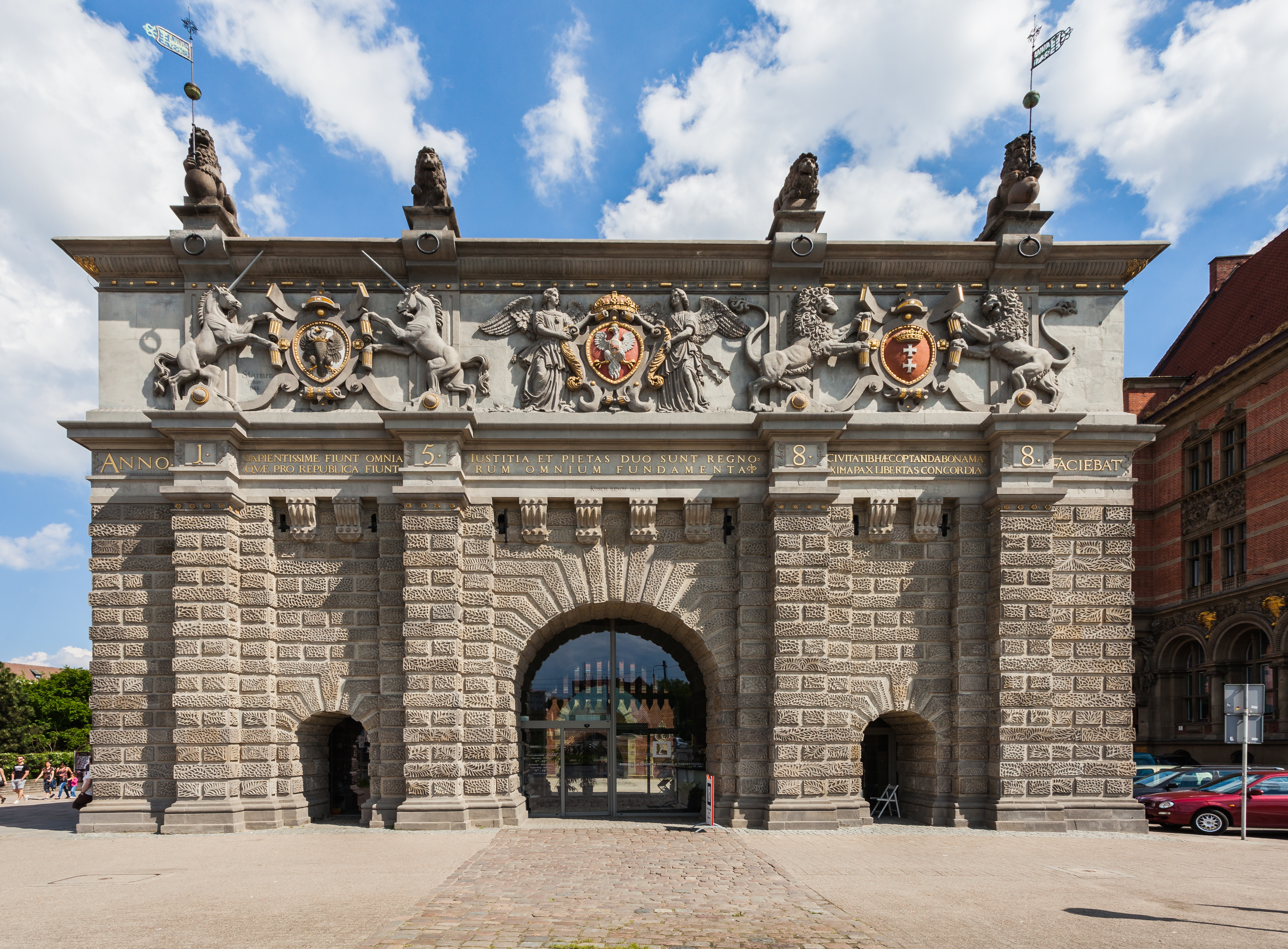
Highland Gate in Gdańsk, Poland, built in the 1580s by Flemish architect Willem van den Blocke

There were migrations of Flemish people to medieval and early modern Poland. The Flemming noble family of Flemish origin first settled in Pomerania and modern Poland in the 13th century with the village of Buk becoming the first estate of the family in the region. The family reached high-ranking political and military posts in Poland in the 18th century, and Polish Princess Izabela Czartoryska and statesman Adam Jerzy Czartoryski were their descendants. There are several preserved historical residences of the family in Poland.

Flemish architects Anthonis van Obbergen and Willem van den Blocke migrated to Poland, where they designed a number of mannerist structures, and Willem van den Blocke also has sculpted multiple lavishly decorated epitaphs and tombs in Poland.

=== Portugal ===
Flemish people also emigrated at the end of the fifteenth century, when Flemish traders conducted intensive trade with Spain and Portugal, and from there moved to colonies in America and Africa. The newly discovered Azores were populated by 2,000 Flemish people from 1460 onwards, making these volcanic islands known as the "Flemish Islands". For instance, the city of Horta derives its name from Flemish explorer Josse van Huerter.

=== United Kingdom ===
Prior to the 1600s, there were several substantial waves of Flemish migration to the United Kingdom. The first wave fled to England in the early 12th century, escaping damages from a storm across the coast of Flanders, where they were largely resettled in Pembrokeshire by Henry I. They changed the culture and accent in south Pembrokeshire to such an extent, that it led to the area receiving the name Little England beyond Wales. Haverfordwest and Tenby consequently grew as important settlements for the Flemish settlers.

In the 14th century, encouraged by King Edward III and perhaps in part due to his marriage to Philippa of Hainault, another wave of migration to England occurred when skilled cloth weavers from Flanders were granted permission to settle there and contribute to the then booming cloth and woollen industries. These migrants particularly settled in the growing Lancashire and Yorkshire textile towns of Manchester, Bolton, Blackburn, Liversedge, Bury, Halifax and Wakefield.

Demand for Flemish weavers in England occurred again in both the 15th and 16th centuries, but this time particularly focused on towns close to the coastline of East Anglia and South East England. Many from this generation of weavers went to Colchester, Sandwich and Braintree. In 1582, it was estimated that there could have been around 1,600 Flemish in Sandwich, today almost half of its total population. London, Norwich and North Walsham, however, were the most popular destinations, and the nickname for Norwich City F.C. fans, Canaries, is derived from the fact that many of the Norfolk weavers kept pet canaries. The town of Whitefield, near Bury, also claims to owe its name to Flemish cloth weavers that settled in the area during this era, who would lay their cloths out in the sun to bleach them.

These waves of settlement are also evidenced by the common surnames Fleming, Flemings, Flemming and Flemmings.

=== United States ===
In the United States, the cities of De Pere and Green Bay in Wisconsin attracted many Flemish and Walloon immigrants during the 19th century. The small town of Belgique was settled almost entirely by Flemish immigrants, although a significant number of its residents left after the Great Flood of 1993.

== See also ==
- De Vlaamse Leeuw
- Greater Netherlands
- Flemish Movement
- Flemish Region
- French Flemish
