= Lexifier =

Language providing most vocabulary to a creole language

A lexifier is the language that provides the basis for the majority of a pidgin or creole language's vocabulary (lexicon). Often, the language is also the dominant language, or superstrate, but that is not always the case, as can be seen in the historical Mediterranean Lingua Franca. In mixed languages, there are no superstrates or substrates but instead two or more adstrates. One adstrate still contributes the majority of the lexicon in most cases and would be considered the lexifier. However, it is not the dominant language, as there are none in the development of mixed languages, such as in Michif.

== Structure ==
Pidgin and creole language names are often written as the following: Location spoken + Stage of Development + Lexifier language. For example: Malaysian Creole Portuguese, with Portuguese being the lexifier and the superstrate language at the time of the creole development.

Often the autoglossonym, or the name the speakers give their contact language, is written Broken + Lexifier, e.g. Broken English. This becomes confusing when multiple contact languages have the same lexifier, as different languages could be called the same name by their speakers. Hence, the names are as stated above in the literature to reduce this confusion.

== Name ==
The word lexifier is derived from the modern Latin word lexicon, meaning a catalogue of the vocabulary or units in a given language.

== Examples ==
- Dutch is the lexifier of Dutch-based creole languages, such as:
  - Negerhollands
  - Berbice Dutch Creole
- English is the lexifier of English-based creole languages, such as:
  - Jamaican Patois
  - Belizean Creole
  - Miskito Coast Creole
  - San Andres Creole English
  - Singapore Colloquial English, a.k.a. "Singlish"
- French is the lexifier of French-based creole languages, such as:
  - Antillean Creole
  - French Guianese Creole
  - Haitian Creole
  - Louisiana Creole
  - Mauritian Creole
  - Réunion Creole
- German is the lexifier of German-based creole languages, such as:
  - Unserdeutsch
- Portuguese is the lexifier of Portuguese-based creole languages, such as:
  - Cape Verdean Creole
  - Korlai Creole Portuguese
  - Malaysian Creole Portuguese
  - Papiamento
  - Guinea-Bissau Creole
- Spanish is the lexifier of Spanish-based creole languages, such as:
  - Chavacano
  - Palenquero
- Zulu is the lexifier of Zulu-based creole languages, such as:
  - Fanagalo
