= Van Osta =

van Osta is a surname. Notable people with the surname include:

- Jean d'Osta (born Jean Van Osta, 1909–1993), Belgian writer, journalist, and humorist
- Ward van Osta, Belgian historian and etymologist
