= Krontjong =

Krontjong may refer to:

- Kroncong (Dutch: Krontjong), a ukulele-like Indonesian instrument and musical style
- Javindo language, also known by the pejorative name Krontjong, a Dutch-based creole language formerly spoken in Java, Indonesia
