= Tallman-Budke House =

Historic house

The Tallman-Budke House, also known as the Onderdonck-Tallman-Budke House, is a historic house in the Germonds neighborhood of West Nyack, New York. It is a four-bay, Jersey Dutch stone house constructed of locally quarried sandstone with an evolved two-door, four-room plan. The roof is of the gambrel style. The house was built in stages, with the earliest southwest quarter built about 1730 by Andros Onderdonck. He may have added the second section, enlarging the original room around 1755. Harmanus Tallman was the second owner, who expanded the house and changed the roofline about 1790. Later owner George H Budke Sr. made more changes starting around 1875. An attempted restoration began about 1978 but was never completed.

The house has remained unoccupied since the 1940s. In 2011, the Town of Clarkstown purchased the property, and in 2017, it was placed on the New York State Register of Historic Places and National Register of Historic Places.
