= Osta =

Osta or OSTA may refer to:

== People ==
- Benedict John Osta (1931–2014), Indian Roman Catholic archbishop
- Clairemarie Osta, French ballet dancer
- Eduardo Osta (born 1959), Spanish tennis player
- Jean d'Osta (1909–1993) Belgian writer, journalist, and humorist
- Pavlina Osta (born 1997), American radio personality

== Acronym ==
- Ontario Student Trustees' Association
- Optical Storage Technology Association

== See also ==
- ÖStA (Österreichisches Staatsarchiv, National Archives of Austria)
