= Pidgin Delaware =

Delaware-based pidgin

- Native to: Mid-Atlantic colonies
- Extinct: after 1785
- Language family: Unami-based pidgin

Language codes
- ISO 639-3: dep
- Glottolog: pidg1246

Pidgin Delaware (also Delaware Jargon or Trader's Jargon) was a pidgin language that developed between speakers of Unami Delaware and Dutch traders and settlers on the Delaware River in the 1620s. The fur trade in the Middle Atlantic region led Europeans to interact with local native groups, and hence provided an impetus for the development of Pidgin Delaware. The Dutch were active in the fur trade beginning early in the seventeenth century, establishing trading posts in New Netherland, the name for the Dutch territory of the Middle Atlantic and exchanging trade goods for furs.

Pidgin languages characteristically arise from interactions between speakers of two or more languages who are not bilingual in the other group's language. Pidgin languages typically have greatly simplified syntax, a limited vocabulary, and are not learned as a first language by its speakers. Words typically have very general meanings but do not carry more than one meaning concept, and do not have the type of structural complexity commonly found in many languages.

== History ==
Knowledge of Pidgin Delaware subsequently spread to speakers of Swedish, and later from Swedes to Englishmen, and was used beyond the immediate area where the pidgin originated. It is most likely that Swedes learned Pidgin Delaware from Dutch speakers; for examples, one of the early Swedish expeditions to the Delaware area had a Dutch interpreter. Similarly, succeeding English groups learned Pidgin from Swedes; Pennsylvania founder William Penn's interpreter Lars Petersson Crock was Swedish.

Pidgin Delaware was used by both Munsee and Unami Delawares in interactions with speakers of Dutch, Swedish, and English. Some non-Delaware users of the pidgin were under the impression that they were speaking true Delaware. Material cited by William Penn as being from a Delaware language is in fact from Delaware Pidgin, and he was apparently unaware of the difference between real Delaware and Pidgin Delaware.

Patterns of usage, involving both Munsee and Unami Delaware, as well as separate groups of Europeans, attests to a widespread and persistent use of Delaware Pidgin as a medium of communication for speakers of Dutch, Swedish, and English, as well as Unami- and Munsee-speaking Delawares.

== Derivation ==
Recordings of Pidgin Delaware suggest that Pidgin words originated from both Northern and Southern Unami. Although the best-known early Dutch settlement was New Netherland, on Manhattan Island, which is in Munsee Delaware territory, Pidgin Delaware has Unami vocabulary almost exclusively, with no terms that can be ascribed solely to Munsee. Even recordings of Pidgin Delaware that were clearly made in Munsee territory have Unami characteristics. The first permanent Dutch settlement in New Jersey was Fort Nassau (on the site of modern Gloucester City). Settlers to an earlier and short-lived factorij at Fort Wilhelmus arrived there in 1624 were subsequently removed to Manhattan between November 1626 and October 1628. Both of these locations are in traditional Unami Delaware territory. The origins of Delaware Pidgin must originate in the earliest contacts between Dutch settlers and Unami Delaware speakers at those locations.

== Sources ==
The first recorded mention of Pidgin Delaware dates from 1628, while the final recorded mention is from 1785. There are two main sources of Pidgin Delaware material. Swedish Lutheran minister Johan Campanius, who served in New Sweden from 1642 to 1648, prepared a vocabulary list and translated into Delaware Pidgin a version of Martin Luther's Little Catechism, which was published after Campanius returned to Sweden. As well, an anonymous vocabulary list of some 260 words entitled "The Indian Interpreter" compiled in the late seventeenth century in West Jersey (an early British colony), and found in a book of land records from Salem County, New Jersey, also contains words in Delaware Jargon. There are also small amounts of material in several other sources, including a 1633 vocabulary collected by Joannis deLaet (de Laet's first name is often spelled inconsistently). Gabriel Thomas collected some Delaware Pidgin materials that were published in 1698. Another vocabulary collected by Ebenezer Denny in 1785 from Delawares who had migrated to western Pennsylvania has features of Pidgin Delaware.

Although Thomason has suggested on theoretical grounds that Pidgin Delaware predated the arrival of Europeans and was used for communication with speakers of Iroquoian languages, there is no attestation of its existence prior to European contact. Against this suggestion are references to the difficulty of communication between Delawares and Iroquoian speakers. Similarly, while Dutch recordings in this early period contain words in the Iroquoian language Mohawk, and Swedish documents contain words in Susquehannock, another Iroquoian language, the primary Dutch and Swedish recordings of interactions with Delawares reflect Pidgin Delaware, suggesting that these Europeans were not using Pidgin Delaware to communicate with Iroquoian speakers.

The recordings of Delaware Pidgin reflect the background of the recorder. Campanius was consistent in mostly using Swedish spelling conventions to reflect phonetic details of Delaware Pidgin words, while the orthography used by deLaet shows Dutch influence, but is rendered less consistent by his attempts to using spelling conventions of other European languages to capture Delaware Pidgin characteristics. The writing used in the "Indian Interpreter" reflects both English and non-English features; some of the latter can be explained by assuming that its author learned the Pidgin from an individual or individuals with a Swedish or Dutch background.

The following table gives a sample of Pidgin Delaware recordings of the words for 'one' through 'ten' from four different sources, with the corresponding terms from Munsee Delaware and Unami Delaware. In cases where the Munsee and Unami terms differ, the Pidgin term corresponds to its Unami congener, confirming the position that Unami is the source language for Pidgin vocabulary.

Pidgin Delaware numbers from 'one' to 'ten'
English	Munsee Delaware	Unami Delaware	De Laet (1633)	Campanius (ca. 1645)	Interpreter (1684?)	Thomas (1698)
one	nkwə́ti	kwə́t·i	cotté	ciútte	Cutte	Kooty
two	ní·ša	ní·š·a	nyssé	nissa	Nisha	nisha
three	nxá	naxá	nacha	náha	Necca	nacha
four	né·wa	né·wa	wywe	næwo	Neuwa	neo
five	ná·lan	palé·naxk	parenagh	parenach	Palenah	pelenach
six	nkwə́ta·š	kwə́t·a·š	cottash	ciuttas	Cuttas	Kootash
seven	ní·ša·š	ní·š·a·š	nyssas	nissas	Neshas	nishash
eight	(n)xá·š	xá·š	gechas	haas	Haas	choesh
nine	nó·li·	pé·škunk	pescon	paéschun	Pescunk	peskonk
ten	wí·mpat	télən	terren	thæræn	Tellen	telen

Many Pidgin Delaware words are clearly of Unami origin, even though they were recorded in traditional Munsee territory in the greater New York area. For example, the Pidgin word cacheus 'crazy, drunk' was recorded from an Esopus sachem on the Hudson River in 1658; this word is from Unami kí·wsu 'he is drunk'. The corresponding Munsee word is the completely different waní·sə̆məw Similarly, the Pidgin expression rancontyn marinit, also recorded as rancontyn marenit 'make peace' was recalled by David de Vries as having been used by Delawares near Lewes, Delaware in 1632, and also near Rockaway, Long Island in 1643, the latter being in Munsee territory. The Pidgin verb marinit or marenit is based upon a Unami verb *maləni·to-· 'to make' that does not occur in Munsee.

== Grammar ==
Pidgin Delaware is characterized by its extreme simplification of the intricate grammatical features of Unami nouns and verbs, with no use of the complex inflectional morphology that Unami uses to convey grammatical information. Morphologically complex words are replaced by sequences of separate words. In cases where a Pidgin word is based on a Unami word that contains more than one morpheme, it can be argued in all cases that the word is treated in the Pidgin as a single unanalysable unit.

The Unami distinction between singular and plural inflection of nouns and verbs is eliminated.

The pronominal categories, which are extensively marked in Unami with prefixes on nouns and verbs, as well as through the system of demonstrative pronouns, are indicated instead with separate words, and distinctions of gender and number (i.e. singular and plural) are eliminated. Separate pronouns that are normally used only for emphasis are used in the Pidgin for first, second, and third person. Pronominal reference is made by using the separate Unami emphatic pronouns for first person singular, second person singular, and an emphatic form of the inanimate singular demonstrative pronoun ('this'). In the following examples, "C" = Campanius, "II" = Indian Interpreter, "T" = Thomas; Pidgin words are enclosed in angled brackets, and items separated by commas are orthographic variants.

(a) First person: C nijr, nijre, II ne, T nee; Unami ni· 'I'

(b) Second person: C chijr, chijre, II ke, T kee; Unami ki· 'you (singular)'

(c) Third person / demonstrative 'this, that': C jɷ̃ni, II une 'that, this'; Unami yó·ni 'this (emphatic)'

The third person pronoun appears both as a third person, and also with demonstrative uses; in the second example the third person is interpreted as plural.

(a) C yɷ̃ni Aana 'this way, that road'

(b) C mátta yɷ̃ní tahottamen nijre 'they do not love me' (not third-person love first-person)

The pronouns are used with both singular and plural reference.

(a) II Nee hatta 'I have' (First-person have)

(b) II Ne olocko toon 'We run into holes' (First-person hole go)

The Unami plural independent personal pronouns are used with both plural and singular reference.

(a) C nirɷ̃na 'my, our', II Ne rune 'we'; Unami ni·ló·na 'we (exclusive)'

(b) C chirɷ̃na 'your (singular or plural)', II Ke runa 'thou', ke rune 'thee'; Unami ki·ló·na 'we (inclusive)', compare Unami ki·ló·wa 'you (plural)'

Delaware Pidgin features include: (a) elimination of the distinction between singular and plural forms normally marked on nouns with a plural suffix; (b) simplification of the complex system of person marking, with no indication of grammatical gender or plurality, and concomitant use of separate pronouns to indicate grammatical person; (c) elimination of reference to plural pronominal categories of person; (d) elimination of negative suffixes on verbs, with negation marked solely by independent particles.

== Treatment of gender ==
A central concept in the Delaware languages, and in all other Algonquian languages is the distinction made between the two grammatical genders, animate and inanimate. Every noun in Unami and Munsee is categorized as either animate or inanimate. Gender does not always correspond to biological categories. All living entities are animate, but so are items such as tobacco pipes, bows, nails, potatoes, and others. Nouns agree in gender with other words in a sentence. For example, the form of a transitive verb will vary depending upon the gender of the grammatical object. The Unami verb for 'I saw it' has the form nné·mən if the grammatical object is inanimate (e.g. a knife, pumpkin, water) but the form nné·yɔ if the object is a ball, an apple, or snow. Demonstrative pronouns also agree in gender with the noun they are in construction with, so that wá (with emphatic form wán) means 'this' referring to animate nouns, such as man, peach, kettle; yə́ (emphatic form yó·n or yó·ni) also means 'this', referring to inanimate nouns such as stone, pumpkin, or boat.

In the Pidgin grammatical gender is not distinguished anywhere. The pronoun yó·n in Pidgin Delaware is used for any demonstrative use as well as the third person pronoun; hence the meaning can be interpreted as 'he', 'she', 'it', 'they', 'this', 'that', 'these', and 'those'.

In the treatment of verbs, Pidgin Delaware typically uses the form a verb specialized for inanimate gender, regardless of the gender of the entity being referred to. Unami uses the verb wələ́su 'be good, pretty' to refer to anything that is classified as animate in gender (e.g. a person, animal), and the corresponding verb wələ́t 'be good, pretty' to refer to anything that is classified as inanimate (e.g. a house, gun). Pidgin Delaware only uses the inanimate form regardless of the gender of the referent; the word is typically represented as orthographic orit or olit. Hence the Pidgin expression 'good friend' occurs as orit nietap, with nietap being the Pidgin word for 'friend'. The same pattern holds for transitive verbs as well.

Learning the patterns of when to use animate and inanimate forms of verbs and pronouns would be very difficult for Europeans to learn since there are no overt cues to help learners decide whether nouns are animate or inanimate. It is likely that the most difficult point would come from nouns such as 'snow' or 'tobacco' which are not biologically alive but count as grammatically animate in gender. Goddard proposes that the strikingly consistent use of inanimate forms, rather than a mixture of animate or inanimate, derives from a systematic strategy adapted by native Delaware speakers to simplify their language when addressing Europeans by employing the inanimate as a default, presumably triggered by the erroneous use of inanimate forms of verbs and pronouns with nouns that are animate in gender but not logically animate. Comments by Jonas Michaëlis, an early observer, suggest that Delaware speakers deliberately simplified their language to facilitate communication with the small numbers of Dutch settlers and traders they encountered in the 1620s. The same observer also notes that when the Delaware talked among themselves, their language was incomprehensible to Dutch speakers who were otherwise able to communicate with the Delaware using the Pidgin, strongly suggesting that the Delawares reserved the full Delaware language for themselves and used the simplified Pidgin when addressing Europeans.

Delaware Pidgin appears to show no grammatical influence at all from Dutch or other European languages, contrary to the general patterns occurring in pidgin languages, according to which a European contributing language will constitute a significant component of the pidgin.

Delaware Pidgin also appears to be unusual among pidgin languages in that almost all its vocabulary appears to come from the language spoken by the Delaware users of the Pidgin, with virtually none coming from European users. The relatively few Pidgin Delaware words that are not from Unami likely were borrowings mediated through Unami or Munsee or other languages.

== Other Algonquian pidgin languages ==
Pidgin Delaware is only one of a number of pidgin languages that arose on the Atlantic coast due to contact between speakers of Algonquian languages and Europeans. Although records are fragmentary, it is clear that many Indians used varieties of pidginized English, and there are also recorded fragments of a pidgin Massachusett, an Eastern Algonquian language spoken to the north of Delaware territory in what is now Boston and adjacent areas.

It is likely that, as with Pidgin Delaware, Europeans who learned other local pidgins were under the impression that they were using the actual indigenous language.

== See also ==
- Mohawk Dutch

== Sources ==
- Goddard, Ives. 1977. "Some early examples of American Indian Pidgin English from New England." International Journal of American Linguistics 43: 37–41.
- Goddard, Ives. 1997. "Pidgin Delaware." Sarah G. Thomason, ed., Contact Languages: A Wider Perspective, pp. 43–98. Amsterdam: John Benjamins Publishing Company.
- Goddard, Ives. 1999. "The use of pidgins and jargons on the east coast of North America." Edward R. Gray and Norman Fiering, eds., The Language Encounter in the Americas, pp. 61–78. New York: Berghahn Books.
