= Negerhollands =

Extinct Dutch creole in the Caribbean

- Creole Dutch
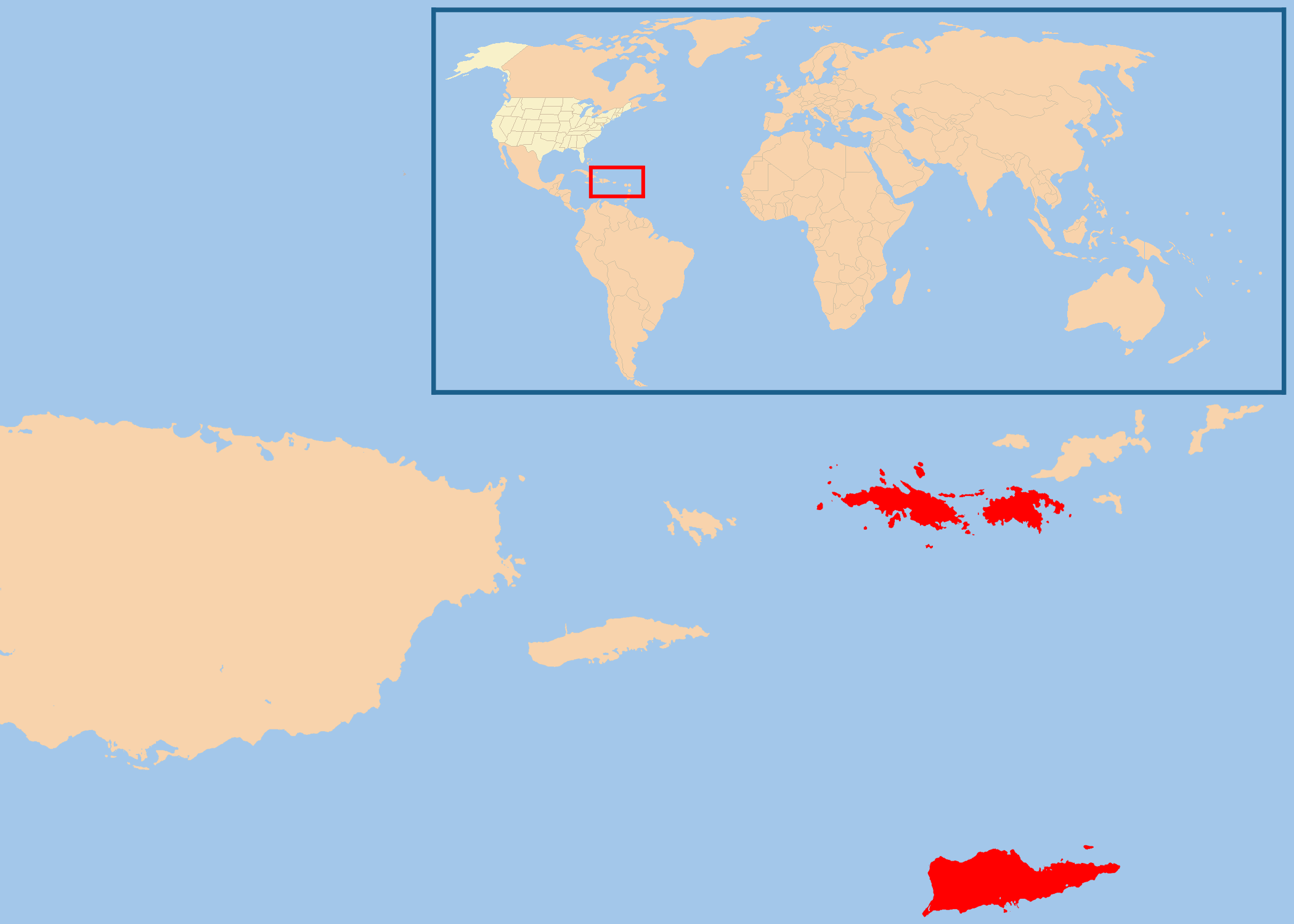
- Negerhollands emerged on the islands of Saint Thomas and Saint John, the upper two islands highlighted in red on the map.
- Region: U.S. Virgin Islands; British Virgin Islands
- Extinct: 1987, with the death of Alice Stevens
- Language family: Dutch Creole: Negerhollands
- Writing system: Latin (Dutch alphabet)

Language codes
- ISO 639-3: dcr
- Glottolog: nege1244

Negerhollands (lit. 'Negro-Dutch'), also known as Virgin Islands Creole Dutch, was a Dutch-based creole language that was spoken in the Danish West Indies, now known as the U.S. Virgin Islands. Dutch was its superstrate language with Danish, English, French, Spanish, and African elements incorporated. Notwithstanding its name, Negerhollands drew primarily from the Zeelandic and probably also from the closely related West Flemish, rather than the Hollandic, dialects of Dutch.

== History ==
Negerhollands emerged around 1700 on the Virgin Islands Saint Thomas and Saint John, then Danish colonies. According to one of the most prevalent theories about its origin, slaves took the embryonic creole language to the island of Saint Thomas when they accompanied the Dutch planters who fled the island of Sint Eustatius after it had been raided by the English in 1666. A census on Saint Thomas from 1688 indeed shows that of the 317 European households on Saint Thomas, 66 (21%) were Dutch, 32 (10%) were English, and 20 (6%) were Danish. This also helps explain the considerable influence English and Danish had on the development of Negerhollands. On Saint John a similar observation can be made, with a 1721 census establishing that 25 (64%) of the 39 planters there were Dutch, and only nine (23%) were Danes. Another theory is that the language was taken to the Caribbean by slaves from the Dutch slave forts in West Africa and Central Africa (e.g. the Dutch Gold Coast or Dutch Loango-Angola).

From 1732 onwards, Moravian missionaries began visiting the Virgin Islands, who introduced an acrolectal version of the language, called Hoch Kreol. From 1765 till 1834, many texts were produced in this language, which gives Negerhollands an almost unparalleled amount of source texts among creole languages. In 1770, Moravian missionaries printed a primer and a small Lutheran catechism, followed in 1781 by a translation of the New Testament into Hoch Kreol.

The language began to decline in the early-mid 19th century as English became the dominant language of the islands. The service in the Lutheran church was held in Hoch Kreol for the native congregation until the 1830s. As younger generations learned English as a native language, use of Hoch Kreol, whose use became limited to church services, was slowly abandoned, having been replaced by the English-based Virgin Islands Creole. It did, however, survive by the Moravian Orphanage at Nyherrenhut near Tutu well into the twentieth century. As older former orphans were volunteers the old Creole dialect persisted around the orphanage with the encouragement of the elders of the denomination. There was a television special on WBNB in the 1970s which had some former orphans who were by that time quite old.

A collection of folk recordings from the US Virgin Islands contains one very short song in Negerhollands: "Twee Shishi" or anglified "Tway She She". It was recorded from Mrs. Gerda Benjamin (1925 - 1983) in 1980. She was not a native speaker, but had learned this song from her mother who did speak the language. The recording is available on Spotify.

Alice Stevens, likely the last native speaker, died in 1987.

== Text samples ==
=== Sample 1 ===
Negerhollands

Die hab well twee drie onder die swart Volk, die sender a leer voor verstaan beetje van die hollandisch Taal, as sender woon na die Stadt, en hoor die ider Dag van die Blanko, maar die Plantey-Volk no kan vor verstaan die soo. Doch, die no sal maak een Verhinder, as die lieve Broeer will skriev eenmaal na sender, maski die ben Hollandisch of na die Hoogduytsch, soo die sal maak sender moeschi bli, en ons sal lees die Brief voor sender na Creol. Na St. Croix die hab meer van die Negers, die sender kan verstaan English, as na St. Thomas en St. Jan, maar doch sender English Praat ka mingel ook altoeveel met die Creol- en Guinee-taal... Da Neger-English die ben.

Modern Dutch

Onder het zwarte volk zijn er wel twee of drie die hebben geleerd om een beetje van de Hollandse taal te verstaan, omdat zij in de stad wonen, en het iedere dag van de blanken horen, maar het plantagevolk kan het niet verstaan. Doch, dit zal hen niet verhinderen, omdat de lieve broeder hun zo nu en dan schrijft, of in het Hollands of in het Hoogduits, wat hen heel erg blij zal maken, en wij zullen die brief aan hen voorlezen in het Creool. Op St. Kruis zijn er meer van die negers, die Engels kunnen verstaan dan op St. Thomas en St. Jan, maar toch is hun Engels veelal gemixt met de Creool- en Guineese talen. Dat is Neger-Engels.

English translation

There are some among the black people who have learned to understand a bit of the Hollander language, as they live in town, and hear it every day from the whites, but the plantation folk cannot understand it. This should not impede if the dear brethren will write to them sometimes, albeit in Dutch or High German, for this will make them very happy, and we will read the letter for them in Creole. On St. Croix, there are more blacks who can understand English than in St. Thomas and St. John, but still their English speech is mixed very much with the Creole and Guianese languages. It is Negro-English.

— Moravian missionary Johan Auerbach in 1774

=== Sample 2 ===
Negerhollands

Maer, wanneer ons sa krieg Tee van Dag? Die Waeter no ka kook nogal. Die Boterham sender no ka snie? Ja, maer die no hab Kaes, en Tata no keer voor Botterham soso. Lastaen sender braen van die rook Karang sender. Kassavie sa wees meer suet mit die Karang as Broot. Ju bin een Creol waer-waer.

Modern Dutch

Maar, wanneer zullen wij vandaag thee krijgen? Het water kan niet nogal koken. Kunnen zij de boterham niet snijden? Ja, maar zij hebben geen kaas en blanken geven niet zo zeer om boterhammen zonder. Laat staan dat zij het warm krijgen van het roken van karang. Cassave met de karang zal meer zoet zijn dan brood. Jij bent een ware creool.

English translation

But, when will we be having tea today? The water can’t be boiling yet. Can’t they cut the bread? Yes, but they don’t have any cheese, and white people don’t care much for bread without it. Let alone enjoying smoking karang. Cassava with karang will be sweeter than bread. You’re a true Creole.

— From 1770

=== Sample 3 ===
Negerhollands

Die how cirj bin fol, en sal gaw ha calluf. Die boricka ka marro en caló over die bergi, mi ka stier die jung fo lo fang die. Die farki bin na cot, mi lolo suk bateta-tow fo jeet fo die. Een cuj ka kom over die barcad en ka destroi alga die jung plantsoon; wen mi fang die mi sal drag die na fort, mak die eigenaer betal. Mi lolo na taphus, mi lolo suk stekki sowed gut fo mi goj na pot.

Modern Dutch

De oude koe is hoogzwanger ('vol') en zal gauw kalven. De muilezel is ontsnapt en de berg overgelopen; ik heb de jongen eropuit gestuurd om hem te vangen. Het varken zit in de stal; ik ga op zoek naar zoete aardappelstengel ('touw') om hem te voeren. Er is een koe over het hek gekomen en heeft de hele jonge aanplant vernield; als ik haar te pakken krijg, breng ik haar naar het fort, en laat ik de eigenaar betalen. Ik ga naar de stad; ik ben op zoek naar een stukje gezouten vlees om in mijn pan te doen.

English translation

The old cow is at full term and will soon have calf. The mule has escaped and gone over the hill; I have sent the youth to catch it. The pig is in the pen; I'm going to look for sweet-potato vine for food for it. A cow has come over the fence and has destroyed all the new plantation; when I catch it, I will bring it to the jail, make the owner pay. I am going to town; I am looking for a bit of salt meat to throw into my pot.

— From 1881

== See also ==
- Berbice Creole Dutch
- Skepi Creole Dutch
- Jersey Dutch
