= East Flemish =

Flemish dialects

- Oost-Vlaams
- Uest-Vloams, Uust-Vloams, Oeëst-Vloams
- Native to: Belgium, Netherlands
- Region: East Flanders
- Language family: Indo-European: Germanic; West Germanic; Istvaeonic; Low Franconian; Dutch; East Flemish

Language codes
- ISO 639-3: –
- Glottolog: oost1241 Oost-Vlaams oost1242 Oostvlaams

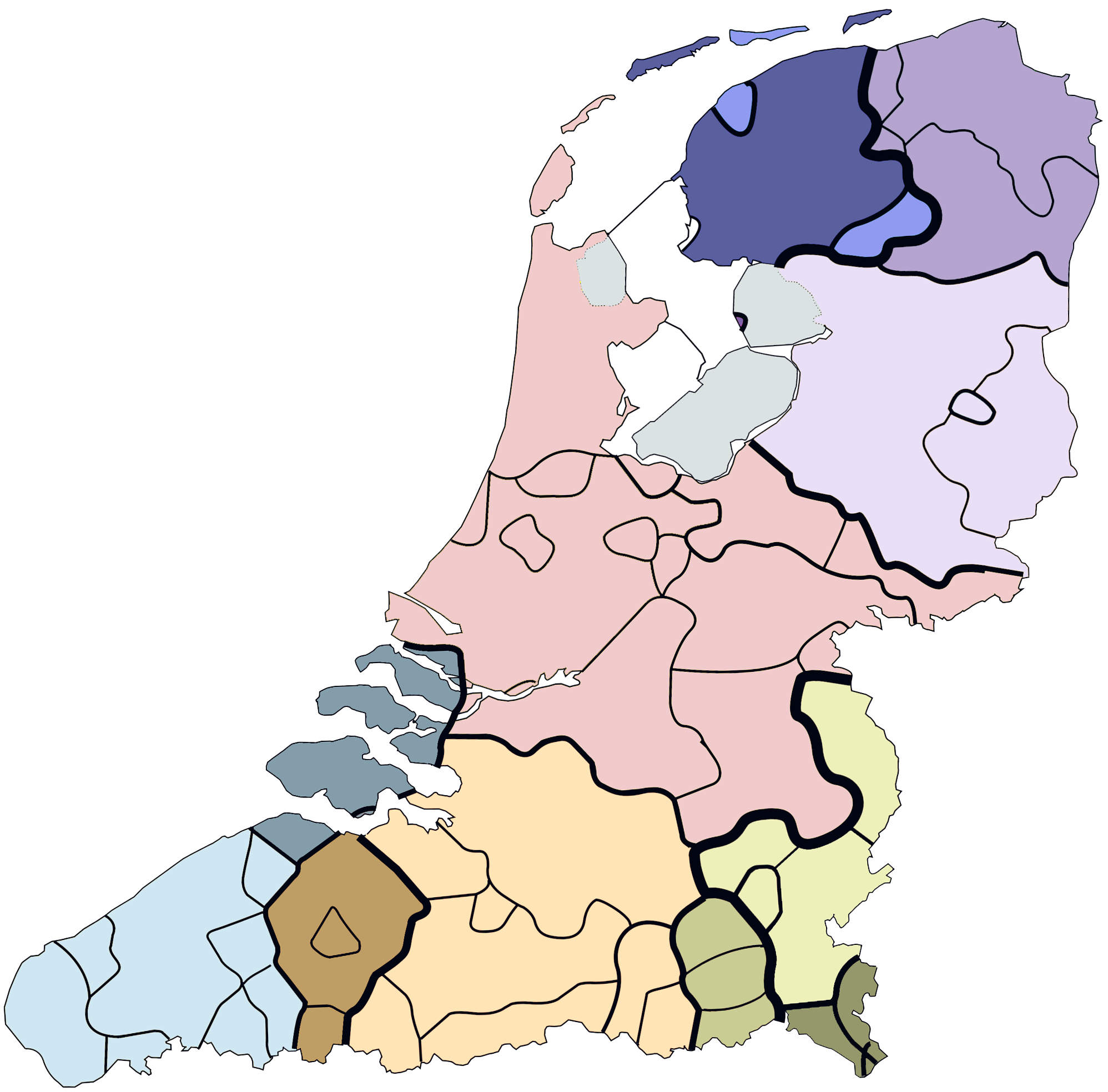
Position of East Flemish (colour: brown) among the other minority languages, regional languages and dialects in Belgium and the Netherlands

East Flemish (Dutch: Oost-Vlaams, French: flamand oriental) is a collective term for the two easternmost subdivisions ("true" East Flemish, also called Core Flemish, and Waaslandic) of the so-called Flemish dialects, native to the southwest of the Dutch language area, which also include West Flemish. Their position between West Flemish and Brabantian has caused East Flemish dialects to be grouped with the latter as well. They are spoken mainly in the province of East Flanders and a narrow strip in the southeast of West Flanders in Belgium and eastern Zeelandic Flanders in the Netherlands. Even though the dialects of the Dender area are often discussed together with the East Flemish dialects because of their location, the latter are actually South Brabantian.

== History ==
Before the occurrence of written records, the dialect continuum that took shape in the Old Dutch language area was characterised mainly by differences from east to west, with the east showing more continental Germanic traits and the west having more coastal Germanic features. In East Flanders, it can be noted that not a single typical eastern Low Franconian trait has reached the region, but coastal characteristics are fairly common, albeit less so than more to the west.

In the 15th century, the dominant position in the Low Countries shifted from the County of Flanders to the Duchy of Brabant, which brought an expansian of linguistic traits from Brabant, the so-called 'Brabantic Expansion'. As the Scheldt delta formed a large barrier in the north, those traits were introduced mainly from South Brabant, particularly the city of Brussels. The Dender area probably already started the process in the 14th century, but Ghent (and probably the rest of the province) resisted those changes for at least another century, as writings from Ghent still indicated a phonology that was typically West Flemish phonology in the mid-16th century. Eventually, two processes caused the spread of Brabantian traits in eastern Flanders:

- The slow infiltration from the east, the Dender area;
- The spread of a trait in the biggest city (usually Ghent) from where it spread to the smaller cities and rural areas. For example, the Brussels pronunciation [yə] for [oə] was first used in Ghent and later spread to most of the province.

While the second process has caused a fairly wide extension of some traits, the traits spread by the first process have reached only the eastern quarter of the province: the Dender and Waasland areas.

Having been dominated by the French, the Austrians and the Spanish, their languages have been other influences on the vocabulary of East Flemish.

== Subdivisions ==
=== Principal dialects ===
- Core Flemish
  - "True" East Flemish (often called "Boers", Dutch for peasant language, by speakers of city dialects)
    - Northeast Flemish
    - Southeast Flemish
  - The Ghent dialect (insular city dialect)
  - The Ronse dialect (insular city dialect)
  - Central Flemish (transitional with West Flemish with which it is also commonly classified)
- Waaslandic (transitional with Brabantian)
  - Waas
  - Eastern Zeelandic Flemish or the Land-van-Hulst dialect
  - The Hulst dialect (insular city dialect)

=== Transitional and mixed dialects ===
- The Maldegem dialect (transitional with coastal West Flemish though it also shows several innovative and intermediary traits)
- The Philippine dialect (mixing East Flemish and Zeelandic Flemish traits)
- The Sas van Gent dialect, a mixture of several dialects, as Sas van Gent was a colonial town with many people from different regions.

A special mention should go to continental West Flemish, which, despite being a West Flemish dialect, has some East Flemish colouring, as Kortrijk was historically governed under Ghent.

== Notable characteristics ==
Even though the East Flemish dialect area is one of the most diverse linguistic landscapes in Belgium, the dialects share some traits that set them apart from Standard Dutch as well as the neighbouring dialects:

- The vowels in ziek ("ill") and voet ("foot") are pronounced as a short [i] and [u], respectively, like in Standard Dutch. In Brabantian, they are long [i:] and [u:], and in West Flemish the ancient diphthongs [iə] and [uə] have been retained though the sound [u] occurs before velars and labials. A notable exception is the dialects of Ghent and Ronse, which, apart from having a general tendency to stretch vowels, have diphthongised them in certain positions to [ɪ.i] and [o.u], respectively. The latter sound can also be heard in Central Flemish before velars and labials.
- The so-called sharp 'oo' in boom ("tree") is pronounced [yə], monophthongised to [y(:)] in the city dialects of Ghent and Ronse, but surrounding dialects have [uə], [wo] or [ɔə]. That trait originally came from the dialect of Brussels and was spread through East Flanders via Ghent. Therefore, that pronunciation also occurs in the southernmost Brabantian dialects. Also, [y(ə)] has not spread across the entire East Flemish dialect area: the Maldegem dialect, the easternmost dialects of the Waasland and most dialects in Zeelandic Flanders use [uə] instead, and the Central Flemish dialects use [yə] or [uə], depending on the following consonant.
- The Old Dutch long vowels in ijs ("ice") and huis ("house") are pronounced as the diphthongs [ɛi] and [œi], respectively. Depending on their dialect and position, they have often been monophthongised to [ɛ] and [œ], respectively. Coastal West Flemish has retained the old monophthongs [i] and [y]. In Maldegem and continental West Flemish, intermediary monophthongs also occur: [e] and [ø] and [ɪ] and [ʏ], respectively. Exceptions are the city dialects of Ghent and Ronse as well as the Central Flemish dialects.
- Plural pronouns usually end in "ulder", like wulder ("we"), gulder ("you") and zulder ("they"). Those pronouns are also used in continental West Flemish, but Maldegem appears to use the coastal pronouns.
- The past tense of weak verbs is formed with "-tege" or "-dege", as opposed to "-te" and "-de" of Standard Dutch and the surrounding dialects. While present in most East Flemish dialects as well as continental West Flemish and some Dender Brabantian dialects, that phenomenon seems to be diminishing in all but the Core Flemish area.
- The -n of plurals and infinitives is usually retained, like in West Flemish, but it has been lost in Brabantian and in the dialects of Ghent and some Waaslaandic towns on the banks of the Scheldt.
- Subordinating conjunctions are conjugated. The Dutch combination ...dat ze... would be in East Flemish ...da(t) ze..., pronounced /dɑ sə/, in the singular, and ...dan ze ..., pronounced /dɑn zə/, in the plural. That occurs also in West Flemish and Zeelandic.
- As in West Flemish and Brabantian, the subject is doubled or even tripled. Standard Dutch "ik ga" becomes East Flemish "'k goa-kik". In the dialects of Ghent and its surroundings, that duplication can occur even after nouns and names.
- As in West Flemish, Zeelandic and Brabantian, infinitive clusters are always ordered V1-V2-V3, with the auxiliary verb first.
- As in most Belgian dialects, except those from the coast and Westhoek and Brabantian dialects, double negations like niemand niet are commonly used.

== Phonology ==
As the realisation of phonemes can be quite divergent in different East Flemish dialects, the phonemes represented here are based on the most common Core East Flemish realisations.

=== Consonants ===
	Labial	Alveolar	Post- alveolar	Velar/ Uvular
Nasal	m	n		ŋ
Plosive	p b	t d		k (ɡ)
Fricative	f v	s z	(ʃ) (ʒ)	x ɣ
Affricate		ts	tʃ	
Approximant	β̞	l		j
Trill		r		

Notes:

- /g/ occurs only in the consonant cluster /gz/ or as an allophone of /k/ when it undergoes the assimilation of voicing or, for Core Flemish, intervocalic lenition.
- The most common realization of the /r/ phoneme is an alveolar trill [r], but uvular realisations [ʀ] or [ʁ] are used in the dialects of Ronse and Ghent and are spreading from the latter.
- The lateral /l/ is velarised postvocalically. In the dialects around Maldegem, syllable-final /l/ is omitted altogether.
- In the western dialects, /ɣ/ is usually realised as an approximant [ɣ˕].
- /ʃ/ and /ʒ/ are not native to many East Flemish dialects and usually occur from the palatalisation of /s/ and /z/, respectively. That is especially common close to the Dender area. Similarly, /tʃ/ may merge into /ts/ in some dialects like Platgents that lack postalveolar fricatives.
- As in Standard Dutch, all plosives and fricatives are devoiced word-finally, but Core Flemish tends to voice plosives between a coloured vowel and /ə/. In some dialects, /k/ also has the allophone [ʔ] in that position.

=== Vowels ===
The following table gives an overview of some common phonemes in stressed syllables. Many East Flemish dialects have lost the phonemic vowel length distinction, but the distincition is made in the following table for the dialects that have kept it. Also, the central vowel /ə/ occurs only in unstressed syllables and is often heavily reduced or even omitted in many dialects.

	Front unrounded	Front rounded	Back
Close	i	y	u
Close-mid	ɪ e(ː)	ʏ ø(ː)	o (oː)
Open-mid	ɛ	œ	ɔ
Open	æ		ɑ

Notes:

- In the true East Flemish dialects, /ɪ ʏ/ are usually diphthongised to [ɪə øə]. In the dialects of Ghent and Ronse, on the other hand, /e ø/ are diphthongised to /ɛɪ œʏ/.
- /ʏ/ is merged into /ɪ/ in several dialects. That included a now-extinct lower-class Ghent dialect, which had the indirect effect of current Platgents rounding /ɪ/ to /ʏ/ in multiple words as a counterreaction.
- /ɛ œ/ are diphthongised to [ɛi œi] before /z/ and /v/. In some northwestern dialects, that is the common pronunciation in most positions. The same goes for /æi/, which has merged with /æ/ in most dialects.
- After /d/ or word-finally, /ɛ/ is pronounced [æ] in most dialects. In the dialect of Ghent, it is pronounced [æ] or even [a] in most positions except before /ŋ/.
- /ɪ ɛ æ/ are merged into [ɛ(i)] when they are followed by /ŋ/.
- When followed by alveolars, /ɔ/ is diphthongised to [oə] in most dialects. In the dialect of Ronse, it is always pronounced [u].
- In many dialects, /o/ and /o:/ have merged. In the dialect of Ghent, the phoneme has later split, based on its position: [ɔu] before velars and labials and [o] before alveolars. One exception is the short /o/ in front of nasal consonants nasals, which has consistently become [u] in Ghent.
- /æ/ and /ɑ/ have become [ɪ] or [ɪə] and [æ], respectively, when followed by an /r/, but that is no longer productive on more recent borrowings or when the /r/ is followed by an alveolar. When they are followed by /rm/, they become [oə] in many dialects.
- In the Ghent dialect, /i/ has diphthongised to [ɪi], /y/ has diphthongised to [yə] when followed by an /r/ or /l/, and /u/ has inconsistently diphthongised to [ou]. The same diphthongisations of /i/ and /u/ occur consistently in the dialect of Ronse.
- Word-finally or before /β̞/, /y/ can be pronounced [œ], [ɔ], [ʏ] etc., depending on the dialect.
- In Platgents, /ə/ has an allophone [o] when it is followed by /l/.

=== Diphthongs ===
The following table shows the common diphthong phonemes in East Flemish, but it also includes some allophones or alternative realisations of the vowels mentioned above.

Starting point		Ending point		
Starting point		Front	Central	Back
Close	front unrounded		iə̯	iu̯
Close	front rounded		yə̯ ~ uə̯	
Close	back	ui̯	yə̯ ~ uə̯	
Close-mid	front unrounded		ɪə̯	
Close-mid	front rounded	øi̯	øə̯	
Close-mid	back		oə̯	ou̯
Open-mid	front unrounded	ɛi̯	ɛə̯	
Open-mid	front rounded	œi̯		
Open-mid	back	ɔi̯		ɔu̯
Open	front	æi̯		æu̯ ~ ɑu̯
Open	back	ɑi̯		æu̯ ~ ɑu̯

Notes:

- In most dialects, /yə̯/ is realised [yə̯], but some peripheral dialects have [uə̯]. Central Flemish has both sounds, depending on its position, but in the southeast of the Waasland, it is pronounced [uə̯] or [iə̯], depending on its position.
- In the city dialects of Ghent and Ronse, /yə̯/ and /iə̯/ are monophthongised to [y] and [i], respectively. In the Ghent dialect, diphthongs, however, are still realised before /r/ and /l/.
- [ɪə̯] and [øə̯] are the "true" East Flemish realisations of /ɪ/ and /ʏ/.
- [oə̯] is an allophone of /ɔ/.
- [ɛi̯] and [œi̯] are northwestern realisations of /ɛ/ and /œ/, respectively, but /æi̯/ is a separate phoneme from /æ/ only in the same area. In many other dialects, diphthongs occur only before /v/ or /z/. In the Central Flemish and the city dialects, those phonemes are generally realised as dark diphthongs.
- /ɛə̯/ used to be an allophone of /e/ before /r/. Because of elision the elision of /r/, /ɛə̯/ can now also be found before other consonants, and the elision of /d/ and French loanwords have reintroduced [e] before /r/. In the dialect of Ghent, /ɛə̯/ is either similar or identical to /ɪ/.
- In the dialect of Ghent, /u/ has inconsistently split into two phonemes /ou̯/ and /u/. In the dialect of Ronse, [ou̯] is the common realisation for /u/, but in Central Flemish, [ɔu̯] is an allophone of /u/ after velars or labials.
- [ɔu̯] is an allophone of /o/ in the dialect of Ghent, and its most common realisation in the dialect of Ronse.
- /ɑu̯/ is a highly-divergent phoneme in East Flanders. In most dialects, it has two different realisations: when followed by /d/ or /w/, [ɑu̯] and [æu̯] are common realisations, bur before /t/ and /s/, it is usually pronounced [ɑi̯] or [æ]. Other realisations may, however, occur in both positions.

== Grammar ==
=== Verbs ===
As in many other southern Dutch dialects, verbal constructions can take several forms, depending on stress, the position of the subject and the next word. Unlike West Flemish, however, there is no subjunctive mood. The following table gives the general rules of conjugation in the present tense and the regular example of zwieren ("to toss"). The spelling is based on Dutch orthography with the addition of ̊ to show devoicing and ̆ to show vowel shortening.

	Ending	Regular order (SVO)			Inversed order (VSO or OVS)		Subordinate clauses (SOV)	
Person and number	Ending	Unstressed	Duplicated	Stressed	Unstressed	Stressed	Unstressed	Stressed
1st sing.	-e / -∅ / (-n)	'k zwiere	'k zwiere-kik	ik zwiere	zwiere-k	zwiere-kik	da-k ... zwiere	da-kik ... zwiere
2nd sing.	-t	ge zwiert	ge zwier-g̊ij	gij zwiert	zwier-de	zwier-de gij	da-de ... zwiert	da-de gij ... zwiert
3rd sing. masc.	-t / ̆-t	ij zwiert	ij zwiert-jij	jij zwiert	zwiert-ij	zwiert-jij	dat-ij ... zwiert	dat-jij ... zwiert
3rd sing. fem.	-t / ̆-t	ze zwiert	ze zwier-z̊ij	zij zwiert	zwier-z̊e	zwier-z̊e zij	da-z̊e ... zwiert	da-z̊e zij ... zwiert
3rd sing. ntr.	-t / ̆-t	't zwiert	-	-	zwier-et	-	da-t ... zwiert	-
1st plural	-en	me zwieren(-me(n))	me zwiere-me wij/wulder	wij/wulder zwieren(-me(n))	zwiere-me(n)	zwiere-me wij/wulder	da-me(n) ... zwieren	da-me wij/wulder ... zwieren
2nd plural	-t	ge zwiert	ge zwier-g̊ulder	gulder zwiert	zwier-de	zwier-de gulder	da-de ... zwiert	da-de gulder ... zwiert
3rd plural	-en	ze zwieren	ze zwieren zulder	zulder zwieren	zwieren ze	zwieren zulder	dan ze ... zwieren	dan zulder ... zwieren

Notes:

- The first-person singular varies depending on the dialect: western dialects tend to add -e, but Waaslandic simply uses the stem. For verbs with a vocal stem, like doen ("to do") Waaslandic and the dialects around Maldegem add -n, but Core Flemish simply uses the stem.
- The ending -t in the second-person and the third-person singular has several realisations. When it is followed by a consonant or the neuter pronoun et, it is not pronounced even if it devoices the following consonant. Before a pause, it is pronounced [t]. In front of vowels, it is usually prononounced [d] except when it follows a voiceless consonant, when it becomes [t].
- In dialects that differentiate between long and short vowels, the stem vowel tends to be shortened in the third-person singular. Compare Waaslandic "gij sloapt" with "ij slopt".
- Inversed forms tend to contract with the subject: verb + ge"l becomes -de (-te after a voiceless consonant), verb + singular ze becomes -se (written as -̊ze in the table above) and verb + we becomes -me. When it is stressed, the pronoun is simply added to contracted form. In the first-person plural the contracted form also commonly occurs in the regular indicatives in main clauses.

==== Preterite ====
Like most other Germanic languages, East Flemish differentiates between strong verbs and weak verbs. Even though there are a few strong verbs in East Flemish that are weak in Standard Dutch, the overall tendency is that East Flemish has more weak verbs. Unlike many other Germanic languages, the rules for the conjugation of the strong preterite are exactly the same as in the present tense. The weak preterite is formed by adding the suffix "-dege" ("-tege" when the stem ends in a voiceless consonant) to the verbal stem. While an -n is usually added in the first-person and the third-person plural, the t-ending is not added except in a few southwestern dialects.

== Ghent dialect ==
The dialect of the province's capital, Ghent, is also different from the language of the surrounding region. The Brabantic expansion is believed to have started in Ghent, which has separated its speech from the other Flemish dialects. Some Brabantic traits were exported to other East Flemish dialects, but many were not. The most notable differences include n-dropping and the more extreme diphthongisation of ii and uu. At the same time, Ghent resisted many innovations characteristic for rural East Flanders. In the 19th and the early 20th centuries, the French uvular r was adopted.
