= Brabantian Dutch =

Dialect group of the Dutch language

Brabantian
- Brabantish, Brabantic, Brabantine
- Brabants
- Pronunciation: [ˈbrɑːbans]
- Native to: Belgium, Netherlands
- Native speakers: ~5 million
- Language family: Indo-European: Germanic; West Germanic; Weser–Rhine Germanic; Low Franconian; Dutch; Brabantian
- Dialects: Eastern; Western; Southern

Official status
- Recognised minority language in: Brussels-Capital Region (Note: Recognized Flemish Brusselian dialect as a intangible heritage language.)

Language codes
- ISO 639-3: –
- Glottolog: brab1243
- Linguasphere: 52-ACB-ak (varieties: 52-ACB-aka to-akk)
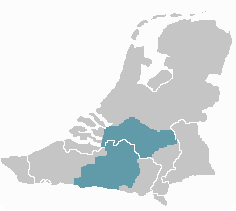
- Brabantian dialectal region (blue, in the Netherlands and northern Belgium), within the Dutch language area (grey)

A Brabantic speaker, recorded in Slovakia.

Brabantian or Brabantish, also Brabantic or Brabantine (Dutch: Brabants, Standard Dutch pronunciation: [ˈbraːbɑnts], Brabantian pronunciation: [ˈbrɑːbans]), is a dialect group of the Dutch language. It is named after the historical Duchy of Brabant, which corresponded mainly to the Dutch province of North Brabant, the Belgian provinces of Antwerp and Flemish Brabant as well as the Brussels-Capital Region (Brusselian; where its native speakers have become a minority) and the province of Walloon Brabant. Brabantian expands into small parts in the west of Limburg, and its strong influence on the Flemish dialects in East Flanders weakens toward the west. In a small area in the northwest of North Brabant (Willemstad), Hollandic is spoken. Conventionally, the Kleverlandish dialects are distinguished from Brabantian, but for no reason other than geography.

Over the relatively-large area in which it is spoken, Brabantian can be roughly divided into three subdialects, all of which differ in some aspects:

- West Brabantian is spoken in the area west of the river Donge, in the west of North Brabant (around the cities Breda, Roosendaal and Bergen op Zoom) and in the north and west of the Province of Antwerp in Belgium.
- East Brabantian is spoken in the area east of the river Donge; in the middle and east of North Brabant (the area around the cities Tilburg, Eindhoven, 's-Hertogenbosch and Helmond), the east of the Province of Antwerp and the northwestern edge of the Dutch Province of Limburg (Netherlands).
- South Brabantian is spoken in the province of Flemish Brabant and the south of Antwerp.

Over 5 million people live in the area where some form of Brabantian functions as the predominant colloquial language; this compares with a total of 22 million Dutch-speakers across the Netherlands and Flanders.

== History ==
Compared to the other dialects and sublanguages of Dutch, Brabantian has historically had a major influence on the development of Dutch. During the Middle Ages, manuscripts from the 10th to 15th centuries show that Limburgish and then West Flemish were the predominant literary languages, but there is no evidence of literary manuscripts farther north.

In the second half of the 14th century, emphasis in society shifted to Brabant and so the Brabantian dialect became dominant. A migration to the north was occurring; the West Flemish dialect influenced the coastal area of the province of South Holland ('s-Gravenhage and Leiden), and migrants from Brabant came to the provinces of North Holland and Utrecht.

In the 16th century, when the Low Countries were in turmoil, another migration occurred from the Spanish Netherlands (roughly what is now Belgium) to the United Provinces of the Netherlands. That made the cultural elite move from the oppressive Spanish and Roman Catholic region to the more liberal (and Protestant) north. Dutch linguistics historian Nicoline van der Sijs says that it is a popular myth that Brabantian was a dominant influence during the standardisation of Dutch from the 16th century. She says that Standard Dutch is a standardised Hollandic dialect. However, researchers of variance linguistics at the Ghent University and Dutch linguists in Berlin recognise the distinctive influence of Brabantian on the first Dutch standardisation in the 16th century. The first major formation of Standard Dutch also took place in Antwerp, where a Brabantian dialect is still spoken. That made the standard language develop mainly from Brabantian influence.

== Current use ==
=== Netherlands ===
The early modern Dutch written language was initially influenced primarily by Brabantian, with strong influence from the Hollandic dialect after the 16th century. Since then, it has diverged from Standard Dutch and evolved its own way, but it is still similar enough for both to be mutually intelligible.

Berlin scientists point to a very important phenomenon in the 20th century in the south of the Dutch language area: there has been an expansion in the use of Brabantian by the dominant presence of native Brabantian-speakers in the modern mass media like radio and television.

About one quarter of the Dutch-speaking population lives in the Brabantian dialect zone. In the Netherlands, rural areas still retain some of their original Brabantian dialects. In large Dutch cities, such as Breda and Eindhoven, where the Industrial Revolution drew many people from other parts of the country, the dialect has been diluted by contact with Standard Dutch. Because people tended to migrate towards the cities from the surrounding rural areas, Brabantian influence is still seen in some terms and in pronunciation (the "Brabantian accent" of Dutch), but the original Brabantian city dialects have largely disappeared there.

However, some large cities, such as Tilburg and 's-Hertogenbosch, still have many people speaking the original Brabantian dialect.

=== Belgium ===
In Antwerp, the local dialect, known as "Antwerps" in Dutch, is Brabantian; however, Het Nieuwsblad wrote in 2020 that "few people can still master it", with its city folk now speaking Tussentaal and Standard Dutch instead. In Brussels, French largely replaced Dutch in the mid-20th century, but there are many cultural activities that use the Brussels dialect (sometimes called Marols), such as the Mass in a church in Jette. Moreover, the use of Dutch is reviving because of young Dutch-speaking families moving back from the suburbs to the old city of Brussels, and an increasing number of non-Dutch-speaking families putting their children in Flemish schools.

The comic artist Hergé based fictional languages like Syldavian in his childhood Marols.

== Differences from Standard Dutch ==
Brabantian is rather close to and contributed to the development of Standard Dutch. A characteristic phrase, houdoe ("take care"), derives from houd u goed (literally, "keep yourself all right"), but colloquial Dutch and Hollandic use doei ("bye").

In South Brabantian (Belgium), "Ale, salu(kes) e!", based on loanwords from French "Allez!" and "Salut!", is a common parting phrase.

Brabantian dialects have a characteristic historic tendency toward accusativism, the use of the accusative case instead of the nominative case. While the cases themselves have fallen out of use in modern language, the accusative form survives in Brabantian, rather than the nominative case of the more northern dialects (nominativism). As the accusative case had different forms for masculine and feminine nouns, both genders have thus remained separate in Brabantian.

== Standardisation ==
The first attempts at standardising Dutch were in the 1540s and based on the Brabantian dialect of Antwerp and its surroundings. However, after the Dutch Revolt, the Dutch economical and political focus shifted north to centre on the County of Holland, which caused the importance of Brabantian to dwindle. Later attempts to establish a standard form of Brabantian have met little success. However, the new phenomenon of tussentaal is becoming widespread.

== Bibliography ==
- Jos Swanenberg (2002). "Brabantish". Language in the Netherlands. Streektaal.net. Archived from the original on 11 October 2017. Dutch versions: Brabants or as PDF archived at Archive.org
