= Javindo =

Endangered Dutch Creole language of Java

- Region: Java, Indonesia
- Native speakers: 10–99 (2007)
- Language family: Dutch Creole: Javindo
- Writing system: Latin

Language codes
- ISO 639-3: jvd
- Glottolog: javi1237
- ELP: Javindo

Javindo, also known by other name Krontjong, is a Dutch-based creole language spoken on Java, Indonesia, such as Semarang. The name Javindo is a portmanteau of Java and Indo, the Dutch word for a person of mixed Indonesian and Dutch descent. Javindo developed from communication between Javanese-speaking mothers and Dutch-speaking fathers in Indo families. Its main speakers were Indo-Eurasian people. Its grammar was based on Javanese, and its vocabulary was based on the Dutch lexicon but pronounced in a Javanese manner. It shows simplification of morphological verb system from Javanese grammar such as merging verb class, disappearance of verbal subcategories.

== Differences with Petjo ==
It should not be confused with Petjo, a different Dutch- and Malay-based creole also spoken by Indo-Eurasians. With the loss of the generation that lived in the Dutch East Indies era, that language has almost died out, but it become identity for Indo descent. In contrast, the colonial society saw the creole languages as a corrupted Dutch which should be corrected as quickly as possible.

Comparison between Javindo and Petjo
	Javindo	Petjo
Actor vs non-actor	strong preference for non-actor-oriented sentences	
Lexifier language	Dutch	
Origin of the Speakers	Semarang	Batavia
Substrate language	Javanese	Batavian Malay
Speaker as actor indicator	taq, tak, ta`	ku-
Hearer as actor	koq	kau- / absent
Affixation by suffix		lack of

== Writing system ==
Javindo is written using Latin script, specifically Dutch orthography.

== Grammar ==
Even though most of the lexicon is derived from Dutch, the grammar of the language is mostly of Javanese origin, including elements such as morphology; lack of verbs; no past tense; no finite verb. The inherited feature of Javindo from Javanese is the non-actor-oriented verb morphology.

- The actor-oriented in Javindo shows similarity to the Dutch construct as there is no nasal prefix morpheme such as in Javanese.

Javindo	dan	wij	kijken	geldnja
Dutch	dan	wij	kijken	het geld
English	then	we	look for	the money

- The suffix -i indicates transitive verb similar to Javanese, but only happens on construct with morpheme taq or koq.
- The suffix -(s)ke shows indirect-relational value with possibility of causative value. For example, jij taq doenske means "I do (it) for you" from Dutch doen "to do".
- Actor preceded taq (sometimes written as tak- or ta`) and koq constructs, but it is not expressed with prefix di- (such as jij digoendoeli 'you are cut bald') and prefix ke- (such as ketjeklik mijn enkel 'my angkle has been strained'). Sometimes, prefix ke- is combined with non-obligatory suffix -an. The difference between construct with prefix di- and prefix ke- is the difference on non-accidental nature vs accidental nature.
- Reduplication shows iterative, intensive, or conative value.
- Dutch influence in non-actor-oriented sentence manifests as usage of passive auxiliary verb (such as worden or zijn) and past participle or usage of past participle only.
