= Ward van Osta =

Belgian historian

Ward van Osta is a Belgian historian and etymologist. He is a member of the Koninklijke Commissie voor Toponymie en Dialectologie.

== Works ==
- van Osta, Ward, Review: "J. Van Loon: De ontstaansgeschiedenis van het begrip 'stad': een bijdrage van de diachrone semantiek tot de sociaal-economische geschiedenis van Noord-West-Europa, inzonderheid van de Nederlanden". Gent, Koninklijke Academie voor Nederlandse Taal en Letterkunde, 2000, 277 p., ill. ISBN 90-72474-30-9.- In: Naamkunde, 32:3-4(2000), p. 221-229
- van Osta, Ward, Overzicht van Noord- en Zuid-Nederlandse lo-namen- Tongeren: Michiels, 2001.- 192 p.- (Werken / Koninklijke Commissie voor Toponymie en Dialectologie Vlaamse Afdeling; 22)

== Sources ==
- Ward van Osta publications, Universiteit Antwerpen Bibliotheek
