= Dutch-based creole languages =

Creole language family with Dutch as lexifier

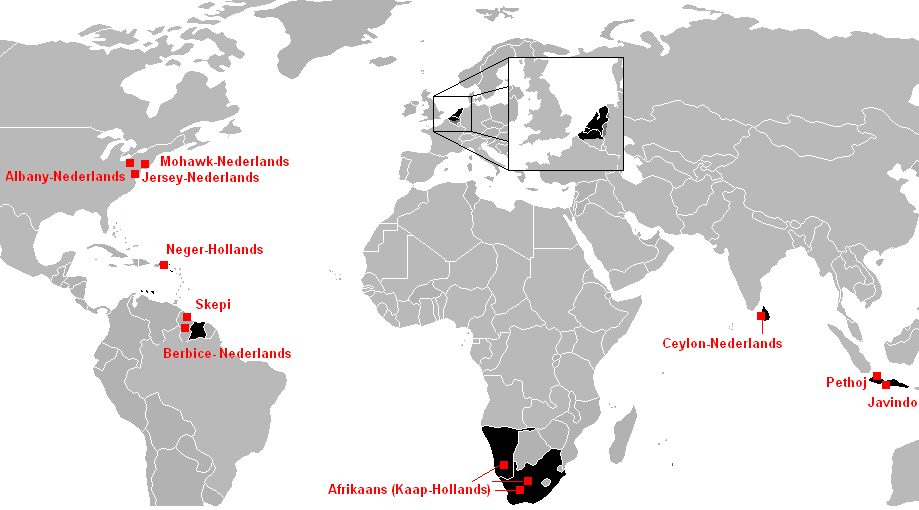
Dutch-based creoles, pidgins, and contact vernaculars (map also includes Afrikaans, a daughter language of Dutch)

A Dutch creole is a creole language whose main lexifier is the Dutch language, a West Germanic language of the Low Countries. These creoles usually developed from Dutch-based pidgins or through language mixing where Dutch served as a major influence.

Most Dutch-based creoles originated in Dutch colonies in the Americas and Southeast Asia, after the 17th century expansion of Dutch maritime trade network and naval power. Almost all of them are now extinct, while two known varieties are classified as "critically endangered" and nearing extinction. The extinction has generally been attributed to a wilful cultural and generational language shift towards standard Dutch or the majority language of the area with each successive generation.

Afrikaans is considered to be a daughter language of Dutch, and by contrast, it is vibrant and has completely displaced Dutch in southern Africa, primarily South Africa and Namibia. Though not a majority-held position, it is considered by some linguists to be a creole because of its simplified grammar relative to Dutch.

== List ==
The following is a list of described Dutch creoles with their locale and status:

Creole	Location	Status
Berbice	Guyana	extinct
Skepi	Guyana	extinct
Ceylon Dutch	Sri Lanka	extinct
Negerhollands	U.S. Virgin Islands	extinct
Petjo	Indonesia, Netherlands (immigrant population)	extinct or critically endangered
Javindo	Indonesia, Netherlands (immigrant population)	critically endangered
Mohawk Dutch	United States	extinct
Jersey Dutch (Bergen Dutch)	United States	extinct

Dutch has also made a significant contribution to other creoles:

- Papiamento — based mostly on Portuguese and Spanish, spoken in Aruba, Bonaire and Curaçao.
- Saramaccan — based mostly on English, Portuguese, and African languages, spoken in Suriname.
- Sranan Tongo — based mostly on English and African languages, spoken in Suriname.
- Manado Malay — based on Malay with a significant number of Dutch vocabulary, spoken in the city of Manado, Indonesia.
  - Borgo — based on Manado Malay as its main lexical, but has a greater influence of Dutch vocabulary compared to the other Manado Malay dialects.

Despite its name, Pennsylvania Dutch is not descended from Dutch but from Deutsch (German), as it is a variety of West Central German.

== See also ==
- Differences between Afrikaans and Dutch
- List of countries and territories where Afrikaans or Dutch are official languages
