= Nicoline van der Sijs =

Dutch linguist and etymologist

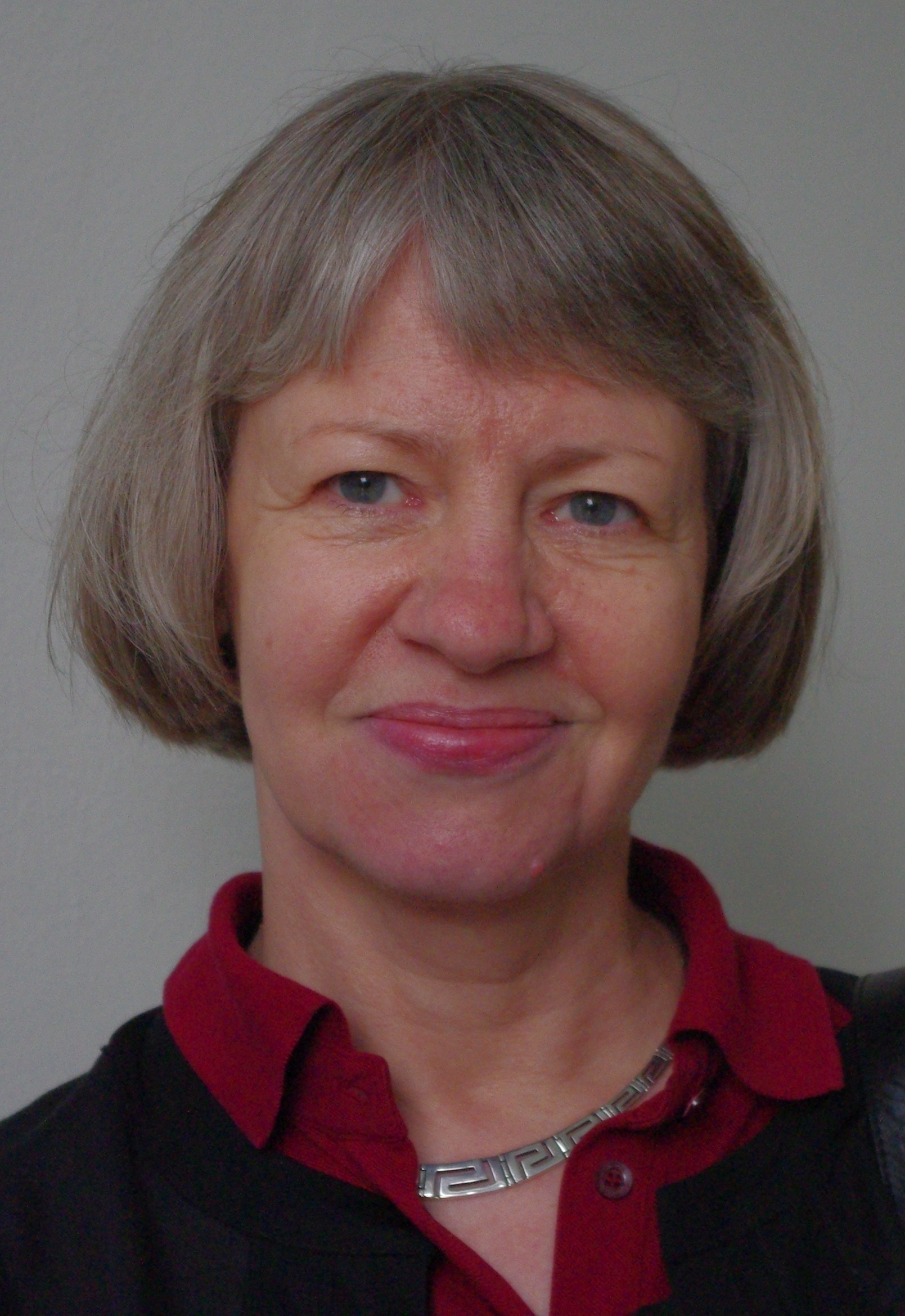
- Born: 1 April 1955 (age 71); Heerlen, Netherlands

Academic background
- Education: University of Utrecht (MA); Leiden University (PhD)

Academic work
- Discipline: Linguist
- Institutions: Radboud University Nijmegen

Nicoline van der Sijs (born 1 April 1955) is a Dutch linguist and etymologist who is Professor of Historical Dutch Linguistics at Radboud University Nijmegen.

== Biography ==
Nicoline van der Sijs was born in Heerlen on 1 April 1955. She received a master's degree in Slavistics from the University of Utrecht in 1979, and a Ph.D. in Dutch historical linguistics from Leiden University in 2001. On 1 January 2013 Van der Sijs was appointed Professor of Historical Dutch Linguistics at Radboud University Nijmegen.
