= Jersey Dutch language =

Extinct dialect of New Jersey and New York, US

Jersey Dutch
- Laag Nederlands (Low Dutch)
- The Jersey Dutch, descendants of New Netherlanders.
- Region: New Jersey and New York, United States
- Ethnicity: Descendants of New Netherlanders
- Extinct: April 17, 1949 (Passing of last native speaker, James Storms.) January 4, 1962 (Passing of the last L2 speaker, John Clifton Storms)
- Language family: Indo-European: Germanic; West Germanic; Istvaeonic; Low Franconian; Dutch; Jersey Dutch
- Writing system: Latin (Dutch alphabet)

Language codes
- ISO 639-3: –
- IETF: nl-u-sd-usnj

Jersey Dutch (Dutch: Laag Duits) (Low Dutch), also known as Bergen Dutch, was a Dutch dialect formerly spoken in northeastern New Jersey from the late 17th century until the early 20th century. It evolved in one of the two Dutch-speaking enclaves that remained for over two centuries after the dissolution of Dutch control in North America, the other (around Albany, New York) giving rise to Mohawk Dutch. It may have been a partial creole language based on Zeelandic and West Flemish Dutch dialects with English and possibly some elements of Lenape.

Jersey Dutch was spoken by the White descendants of New Netherlanders who settled in Bergen, New Netherland, in 1630, and by Black slaves and free people of color also residing in that region, including the Ramapough Mountain People.

== Varieties ==
By the mid-eighteenth century, according to one estimate, up to 20% of the population of the areas of New Jersey with "a strong Dutch element" were enslaved people. Black people who grew up in insular Dutch communities were raised speaking the Dutch language, or adopted it later in life, to speak both with their white Dutch-descendant counterparts and with each other. Some Blacks during this period spoke Dutch as their primary or only language, and for some knowing the language was a point of pride:

"They were Dutch and proud of it. I can remember my Aunt Sebania telling me about her great-grandmother, a stern old lady who both spoke and understood English, but who refused to speak it except in the privacy of her home. In public she spoke Dutch, as any proper person should do, a dignified language."

=== Negerduits ===
Some contemporary reports from white speakers of Jersey Dutch reported a distinct variety of the language unique to the black population, which they called Negerduits ("Negro Dutch", not to be confused with the Dutch creole Negerhollands). This term was used both for the speech of the Ramapo Mountain People, and of black people in Bergen County.

However, as attestation of Jersey Dutch from black and Ramapough speakers is scarce, scholars disagree whether Negerduits can be considered a distinct variety. Sojourner Truth's Dutch, for example, was described by her owner's daughter around 1810 as "very similar to that of the unlettered white people of her time." The only contemporaneous linguistic treatment of Jersey Dutch draws primarily on the speech of four speakers, three whites and one person from the Ramapo Mountain people. It notes phonetic, syntactic, and lexical differences between the two groups.

== Phonology ==
=== Vowels ===
The vowel system of Jersey Dutch differs markedly from Standard Dutch, as well as from the Dutch dialects from which it derives, perhaps due to the influence of American English. The following chart is based on the speech of two white Jersey Dutch speakers recorded in 1910 and 1941 respectively. Parentheses "indicate that the vowel is attested in few forms."

Jersey Dutch vowel phonemes
	Front				Central	Back	
	unrounded		rounded		Central	Back	
	short	long	short	long	Central	short	long
Close	(ɪ)	iː		yː		(ʊ)	uː
Close-mid		eː	œ	œː			oː
Open-mid	ɛ				(ʌ)	ɔ	ɔː
Open	æ	æː				ɑ	ɑː
Diphthongs	ai̯ (æi̯) ɛu̯ (œːu̯) aːu̯						

=== Consonants ===
Jersey Dutch consonants are largely the same as those of Standard Dutch, with a few exceptions.

		Labial	Alveolar	Dorsal	Glottal
Nasal		m	n	ŋ	
Plosive	voiceless	p	t	k	
Plosive	voiced	b	d	(ɡ)	
Fricative	voiceless	f	s	x	h
Fricative	voiced	v	z	(ɣ)	
Approximant		w	ɫ	j	
Rhotic			ɹ		

== Example ==
An example of Jersey Dutch, transcribed in 1913, spoken by Matthew Hicks of Mahwah, the white sexton of a Dutch church.

=== Jersey Dutch ===
De v'lôrene zön:
En kääd’l had twî jongers; de êne blêv täus;
de andere xöng vôrt f’n häus f’r en stât.
Hāi wāz nît tevrêde täus en dârkîs tû râkni ārm.
Hāi doǵti ôm dāt täus en z’n vâders pläk.
Tû zāide: äk zāl na häus xâne. Māin vâder hät plänti.

=== Standard Modern Dutch ===
Below is a word-by-word translation of the Jersey Dutch quote, rather than a fluent Dutch rendering.

De verloren zoon:
Een kerel had twee jongens; de ene bleef thuis;
de andere ging voort van huis voor een vermogen.
Hij was niet tevreden thuis en daardoor toen raakte hij arm.
Hij dacht aan dat thuis en zijn vaders plek.
Toen zei hij: ik zal naar huis gaan. Mijn vader heeft overvloed.

=== English ===
The prodigal/lost son:
A man had two sons; the one stayed at home;
the other went abroad from home to make his fortune.
He was not content at home and therefore then he became poor.
He thought about it at home and his father’s place.
Then said: I shall go home. My father has plenty.

== See also ==
- List of Bergen, New Netherland placename etymologies
- Mohawk Dutch
