= Skepi Creole Dutch =

Extinct Dutch Creole once spoken in Guyana

Skepi Dutch Creole
- Region: Guyana
- Extinct: by 1998
- Language family: Dutch Creole: Skepi Dutch Creole

Language codes
- ISO 639-3: skw
- Glottolog: skep1238

Skepi is an extinct Dutch-based creole language of Guyana, spoken in the region of Essequibo. It was not mutually intelligible with Berbice Creole Dutch, also spoken in Guyana. This language has been classified as extinct since 1998.

== Description ==
By the twentieth century, the existence of a Dutch creole language in the former Essequibo colony was largely forgotten about, and the language only gained the interest of linguists after the Guyanese linguist Ian E. Robertson, who had already brought Berbice Creole Dutch to the attention of the scientific community, also found people on the Essequibo River who remembered a Dutch creole language. In contrast to Berbice Creole Dutch, however, Skepi—which name derives from Yskepi, the first Dutch name of the Essequibo River—was not actively spoken anymore during Robertson's fieldwork. The sample sentences and a Swadesh list compiled by Robertson were thus based on the memories of non-native speakers of the language still spoken by their parents or grandparents.

After Robertson published his material, some older sources emerged. In the memoir of reverend Thomas Youd, who was a missionary in British Guiana, it is asserted that British missionaries learnt Skepi in the 1830s and that they used this language in their church services. According to this memoir, these missionaries also produced a dictionary of the language, which since has been lost, however. This is equally the case for a "word list submitted by a German veterinary surgeon."

In 2013, a letter written by Essequibo planter Wernard van Vloten emerged which contained a small fragment in Skepi Dutch. This letter, which was dated 26 September 1780, is believed to be the oldest source of the Skepi language. In 2020, 125 Skepi sentences and 250 Skepi words found in the diary of Thomas Youd were published in the Journal of Pidgin and Creole Languages by Bart Jacobs and Mikael Parkvall.

== Sample texts ==
Since the language was already extinct when Ian Robertson first investigated the Dutch creoles in Guyana in 1975, much of Skepi is known only through the memory the descendants of native speakers have of the language their forefathers spoke. The following three sample sentences appeared in a Zeelandic newspaper in 1997.

Ek we stekkie brot.

Translation: I want a slice of bread.

War ek sa lek em?

Translation: Where shall I put it?

'Em ne ben joe, 'em ben ander domnie.

Translation: "It was not you, it was that other minister (clergyman)."

=== Fragment from the 1780 letter by Van Vloten ===
[...] en sok kum kloeke dagka van noom di sitte bi warme lantta, en als um kom weeran bi Bikkelante, Hom sel brengk van die 4 blabba moye goeto.

Translation: "[...] and try to come one beautiful day to Uncle who lives in a warm country, and when he comes back to the country of the White people, he will bring nice things for the four children.’"
