= Mohawk Dutch =

Extinct language of North America

- Native to: New Netherland
- Region: North America
- Extinct: possibly late 19th to early 20th century
- Language family: Dutch-based creole with Mohawk: Mohawk Dutch

Language codes
- ISO 639-3: None (mis)
- Glottolog: None

Mohawk Dutch (Dutch: Mohawk-Nederlands) is an extinct Dutch-based creole language mainly spoken during the 17th century west of Albany, New York, in the area around the Mohawk River, by the Dutch colonists who traded with or to a lesser extent mixed with the local population from the Mohawk nation.

At the height of the Republic of the Seven United Netherlands' North American colony of New Netherland, there were 18 languages spoken within Dutch-controlled territory. Dutch settlers frequently married indigenous women, most commonly from the Mohawk, with whom they were strong allies. The resulting children often drifted between the territory of the Haudenosaunee Confederacy and New Netherland, forming among themselves a creole taking elements from both languages.

One lullaby purported to be in Mohawk Dutch was recorded as part of the research for the Dictionary of American Regional English; it is mostly German with one Dutch diminutive suffix (whose German equivalent also occurs), one Dutch word and one word ("baby") that probably comes from a local language.

== See also ==
- Jersey Dutch
- Michif
- Mohawk language
- Pidgin Delaware
