= Berbice Creole Dutch =

Extinct Dutch creole spoken Guyana

Berbice Dutch Creole
- Region: Berbice (Guyana)
- Extinct: 2005, with the death of Bertha Bell
- Language family: Dutch Creole: Berbice Dutch Creole

Language codes
- ISO 639-3: brc
- Glottolog: berb1259
- ELP: Berbice Creole Dutch

Berbice Dutch Creole (also known as Berbice Dutch) is a now-extinct Dutch creole language, once spoken in Berbice, a region along the Berbice River in Guyana. It had a lexicon largely based on Dutch and Eastern Ijo varieties from southern Nigeria. In contrast to Virgin Islands Dutch Creole (previously known as Negerhollands), a Dutch creole formerly spoken in the Virgin Islands, Berbice Dutch Creole and its geographically adjacent Skepi Dutch Creole of the Essequibo were unknown to the outside world until Ian Robertson first reported on the two languages in 1975. The Dutch linguist Silvia Kouwenberg subsequently investigated the creole language, publishing its grammar in 1994, and numerous other works examining its formation and uses.

== History ==
Berbice was settled as a privately managed colony in 1627 under the patronage of the Dutch merchant Abraham van Peere. Berbice remained a Dutch possession for nearly two centuries. On 22 April 1796, the British occupied the territory. On 27 March 1802, Berbice was restored to the Batavian Republic (the then-current name of the Netherlands). In September 1803, the British re-occupied the territory again. Along with Essequibo and Demerara, the Berbice colony was formally ceded to Britain in 1815. The three were united to create British Guiana in 1831, which gained independence as Guyana in 1966.

The Dutch established sugar plantations and cacao & coffee plantations on the banks of the Berbice and Canje Rivers. The plantations created close contact between numerous language groups as enslaved people were trafficked to Berbice. While the enslaved populations initially included Indigenous Lokono (Arawak) people, the practice of using enslaved Indigenous people declined and ultimately ceased altogether in the course of the seventeenth century. Linguistic evidence supports the view that early in the establishment of the Dutch colony, enslaved people were trafficked to Berbice from the Eastern Niger Delta in the Bight of Biafra. Thus, the initial contact situation consisted of Indigenous Lokono speakers, Eastern Ijo varieties from the Bight of Biafra, and Dutch colonisers mostly speaking southwestern varieties from Zeeland. It is in this context that Berbice Dutch emerged. Kouwenberg has argued that the language was largely constructed by children born locally in the colony, of mixed Amerindian-Dutch, African-Dutch and Amerindian-African parentage.

One-third of the most basic words in Berbice Dutch, including words for 'eat', 'know', and 'speak' are of Niger–Congo origin in West Africa, from a single language-cluster, the Eastern Ijo languages. Not counting a substantial number of words borrowed from Creolese (Guyanese Creole English), with which Berbice Dutch coexisted for well over a century before its final demise, and around a hundred words of unknown origin (many likely from Lokono), the language's overall lexicon derives from Dutch (63%), Eastern Ijo (19%) and Arawak (18%). Berbice Dutch is considered unique among Creole language because only one African language appears to have impacted its formation..

Like the other Dutch-lexified Caribbean Creole languages Virgin Islands Dutch Creole and Skepi Dutch Creole, the Dutch component is based on Zeelandic, rather than the Hollandic dialect of Dutch (the dialect that is closest to the modern standard of the Dutch Language Union). Comparatively, Berbice Dutch is lexically farthest from Dutch due to the large Eastern Ijo component in its lexicon.

The Dutch plantations where the language arose were located on the Berbice River and its tributaries and the Canje River. The English period saw a shift of planting activity downriver to the coast in the 19th century. For the next century, small groups of mixed heritage Berbice Dutch-speakers continued to live in the original locations up-river, alongside Lokono speakers in Arawak communities. The Berbice Dutch language survived into the 20th century among a small number of families in the heart of the former plantation colony, on the Wiruni Creek (a tributary to the Berbice River) and in locations on the Berbice River upstream from the Wiruni Creek. Berbice became part of British Guiana at this time and as enslaved people from Barbados arrived, a new English-lexified Creole emerged.

As the isolation of their upriver locations was gradually breached from the mid nineteenth century, by the introduction of missionary outposts and schools, and by opportunities for men to earn money in multilingual timber and balata work gangs, use of Berbice Dutch began to decline. The combination of stigma (it was seen as "broken" language) and the realisation that opportunities for work and education required knowledge of Creolese and English, meant that parents stopped transmitting it to their children. A few families retained use of the language longer than others, and it is the last members of these families who were found in the mid 1970s by Guyanese linguist Ian Robertson. Most were then already of advanced age, and had not used Berbice Dutch in decades.

It is Ian Robertson's 1979 dissertation 'Berbice Dutch - A Description' which brought the language to the attention of Dutch linguists with a strong interest in the study of Creole languages. Thanks to the coincidental availability of a comparative Ijo word list, Norval Smith (University of Amsterdam, the Netherlands) identified Eastern Ijo as the source of the African component in the language. Silvia Kouwenberg did further investigations on the language and published a grammar in 1994 as well as a variety of other works relating to the language.

== Extinction ==
The last known Berbice Dutch Creole speaker was Albertha Bell, who was 103 years old when last interviewed by Ian Robertson and a UWI linguistics research team in March 2004. In February 2010, the language was declared officially extinct, according to an article in the March issue of the Dutch edition of National Geographic magazine and the international language database Ethnologue had declared it extinct.

== Phonology ==
=== Vowels ===
	Front	Back
High	i	u
Mid	e	o
Mid	ɛ	
Low	a	

There is a degree of free variation in the vowels, with the range of realisations of some phonemes overlapping.

/e/ and /ɛ/ are almost in complementary distribution, and were probably allophones at an earlier stage of the language.

=== Consonants ===
		Labial	Alveolar	Palato- alveolar	Velar	Glottal
Nasal		m	n			
Plosive	Voiceless	p	t		k	
Plosive	Voiced	b	d		ɡ	
Fricative	Voiceless	f	s	(ʃ)		h
Fricative	Voiced	(v)	(z)			
Approximant	Median		ɹ			
Approximant	Lateral		l			

[ʃ] is usually in complementary distribution with [s], occurring mainly before /i/, but there are a handful of exceptions.

/v/ and /z/ occur only in loanwords from Guyanese Creole.

== Syntax ==
=== Pronouns ===
Personal Pronouns
1SG	ɛkɛ
2SG	ju
3SG	o, ori ʃi [GEN]
1PL	enʃi, iʃi
2PL	jɛndɛ
3PL	eni, ini

Each pronoun, apart from o, can be made reflexive when followed by the word selfu ('self').

alma da ɛkɛ selfu so brɛkɛ-tɛ eni
all COP 1SG REFL FOC break-PFV 3PL
'All, (it) is myself (that) broke them.'

The suffix -di is added for emphasis:

ɛkɛ pama-tɛ ɛkɛ-di jɛrma [...]
1SG tell-PFV 1SG-EMPH woman [...]
'I told my wife [...]'

The enclitic nominaliser jɛ can similarly mark emphasis on pronouns:

iʃi-jɛ "language" masi onli hiri
1PL-NMLZ language must only here
'Our language probably exists only here.'

The 1st and 2nd person forms and the empathic marker di are of Dutch origin, while the nominaliser jɛ and the 3rd person forms o, ori and eni ~ ini are from Eastern Ijo.

== Other Reading ==
- Kouwenberg, Silvia (1994). "Berbice Dutch". In Jacques Arends, Pieter Muysken & Norval Smith (ed.). Pidgins and Creoles: An Introduction. John Benjamins. pp. 233–243.
