= Jean d'Osta =

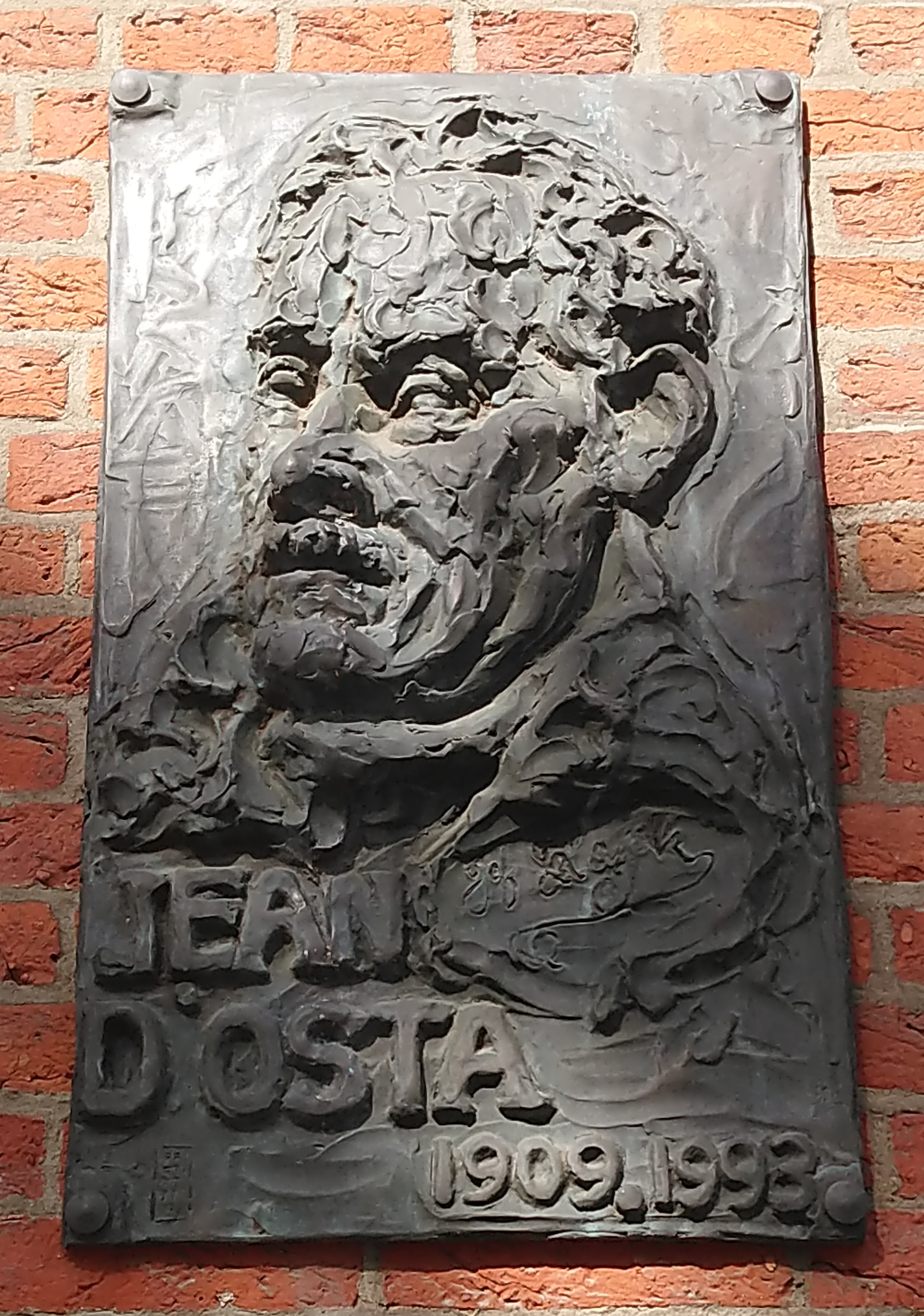
Memorial plaque of Jean d'Osta in Brussels

Jean d'Osta pseudonym of Jean Van Osta, (Brussels – Belgium, 1909–1993) was a Belgian writer, journalist, humorist, and great lover of Brussels. He has written many books about Brussels and its local dialect called Marols. He created the personage Jef Kazak, which appeared for several decades in the Belgian weekly magazines Pourquoi Pas? (E: Why not) and Vlan.

== Bibliography ==
- Primevères (poetry), Jean d'Osta.
- Le livre du bonheur (novel), Jean d'Osta, 1927.
- Encyclopédie du Kitsch, Jean d'Osta, Pierre De Meyer Editeur, Brussels, 1972.
- Jef Kazak, professeur de belles manières (disque LP 33 tours), sketches bruxellois par Jean d'Osta, Bruxelles : Daron-Bruyninckx Brussels, 1972, Decca LPD 224-X 345 & Omega International 333.114-X.
- Bruxelles d'hier et d'aujourd'hui, Jean d'Osta, ed. Rossel Edition, 1976.
- Notre Bruxelles oublié, Jean d'Osta, ed. Rossel, 1977.
- Bruxelles Bonheur, Jean d'Osta, ed. Rossel, 1980.
- Dictionnaire historique et anecdotique des rues de Bruxelles, Jean d'Osta, Brussels, Ed. Paul Legrain, 1986, 358p.
- Dictionnaire historique des faubourgs de Bruxelles, Jean d'Osta, Brusselss, Ed. Paul Legrain, 1989.
- Dictionnaire du dialecte bruxellois, by Louis Quiévreux, Bruxelles, 1951; 1985 5th edition with un addedum Phonétique et grammaire du flamand de Bruxelles by Jean d'Osta.
- Mémoires de Jef Kazak, Jean d'Osta, Brussels : Racine, 2002. 148 p.; 24 cm. ISBN 2-87386-285-8. BB A 2002 6.107.
- Bob Fish Detectief (Comic strip), author Yves Chaland translation in Bruxellois by Jean d'Osta, Magic Strip, 1982, 45p.
- Mémoires candides d'un Bruxellois ordinaire, Jean d'Osta, Brussels, Ed. Paul Legrain, 1984.
- Le Calendrier de Jean d'Osta, Jean d'Osta, Brussels, Ed. Paul Legrain, 1987, 320p.
