= Marollian dialect =

Traditional dialect spoken in Brussels, Belgium

Marollian
- Marollien (French); Marols (Dutch)
- Native to: Belgium, specifically Brussels
- Language family: Indo-European: French and Dutch; Belgian French, Picard and Flemish Brusselian; Marollian
- Writing system: Latin script

Official status
- Recognised minority language in: Brussels-Capital Region

Language codes
- ISO 639-3: None (mis)
- Location within Brussels
- Coordinates: 50°50′48.05″N 4°21′9″E

Marollian (French: Marollien; Dutch: Marols) is a traditional dialect native to Brussels, Belgium, sometimes considered by some speakers and linguists as a distinct variety of Brusselian. A mixture of French, Picard and Flemish Brusselian, it was widely spoken in the Marolles/Marollen neighbourhood of the City of Brussels, from which it takes its name, until the 20th century. It still survives among a small minority of inhabitants called Brusseleers (or Brusseleirs), many of them quite bi- and multilingual in French and Dutch.

== Toponymy ==
The toponyms Marols in Dutch or Marollien in French refer to the Marolles/Marollen, a neighbourhood of the City of Brussels, near the Palace of Justice, which itself takes its name from the former abbey of the Apostoline sisters, a religious group based in this area during the Middle Ages (from Mariam Colentes in Latin ("those who honour the Virgin Mary"), later contracted to Maricolles/Marikollen, and finally Marolles/Marollen). Historically a working class neighbourhood, it has subsequently become a fashionable part of the city.

== Description ==
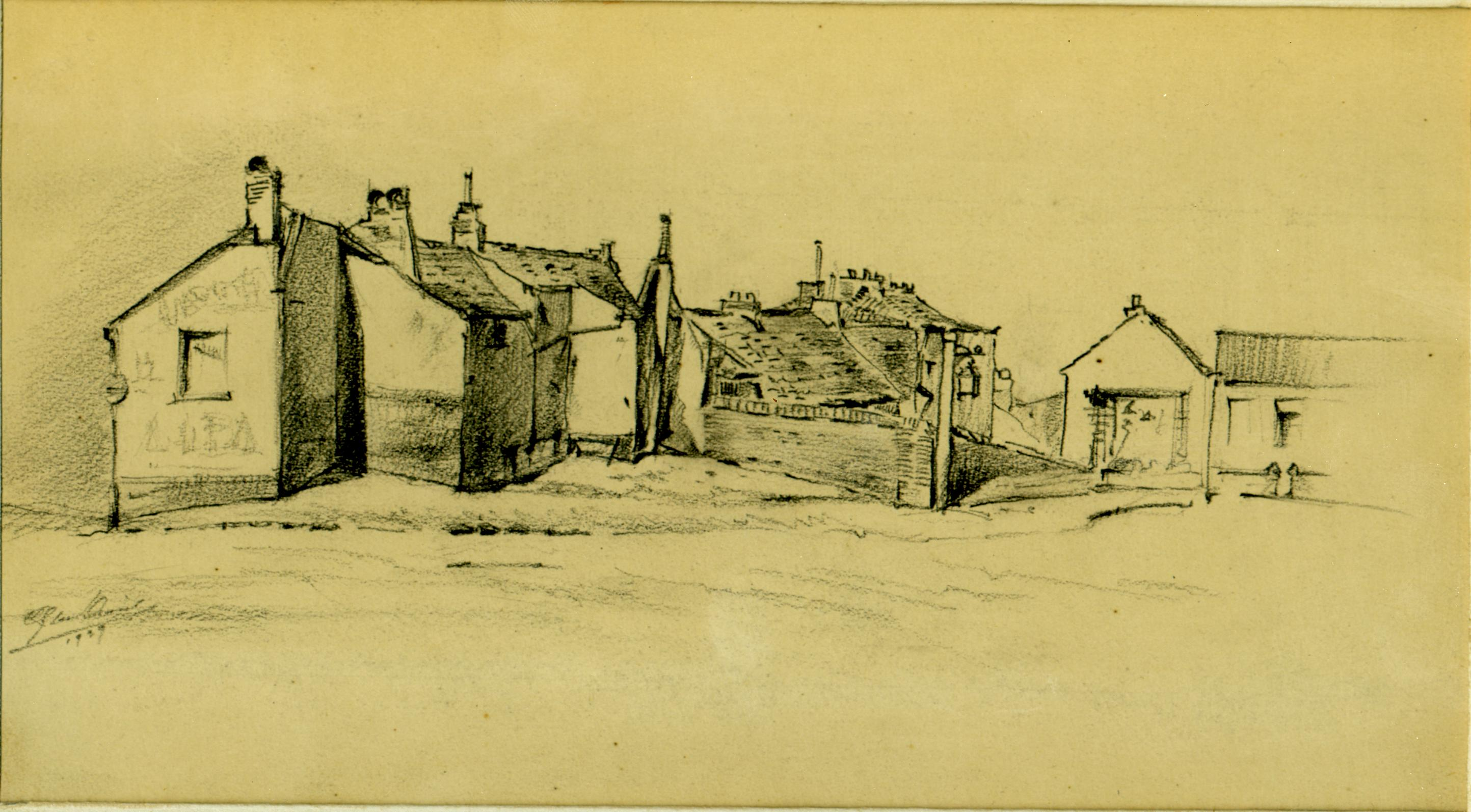
Sketch of the Marolles/Marollen in 1939 by Léon van Dievoet

There is a dispute and confusion about the meaning of Marollian, which many consider to be a neighbourhood jargon distinct from a larger Brusselian dialect, while others use the term as an overarching substitute for that citywide dialect. It is a triple language based on a mixture of French and Picard, incorporating vocabulary and expressions from Flemish Brusselian. According to Jeanine Treffers-Daller, "the dialect has a tremendous prestige and a lot of myths are doing the rounds."

If you ask ten Brusselers what "Marollien" is, you get ten different answers. For some people it is French contaminated by Flemish and spoken in the neighborhood of the rue Haute and the rue Blaes, whereas for others it is Frenchified Flemish. Still others say that it is a vernacular variety of French, spoken in the whole city, etc., etc. Marollien, however, is exceptional if not unique, because it is a double language. In fact it is not between the germanic and romance languages, it is both.

— Jacques Pohl, 1953,

Marollian is described as "totally indecipherable to the foreigner (which covers everyone not born in the Marolles), which is probably a good thing as it is richly abusive."
