= Ablington Manor =

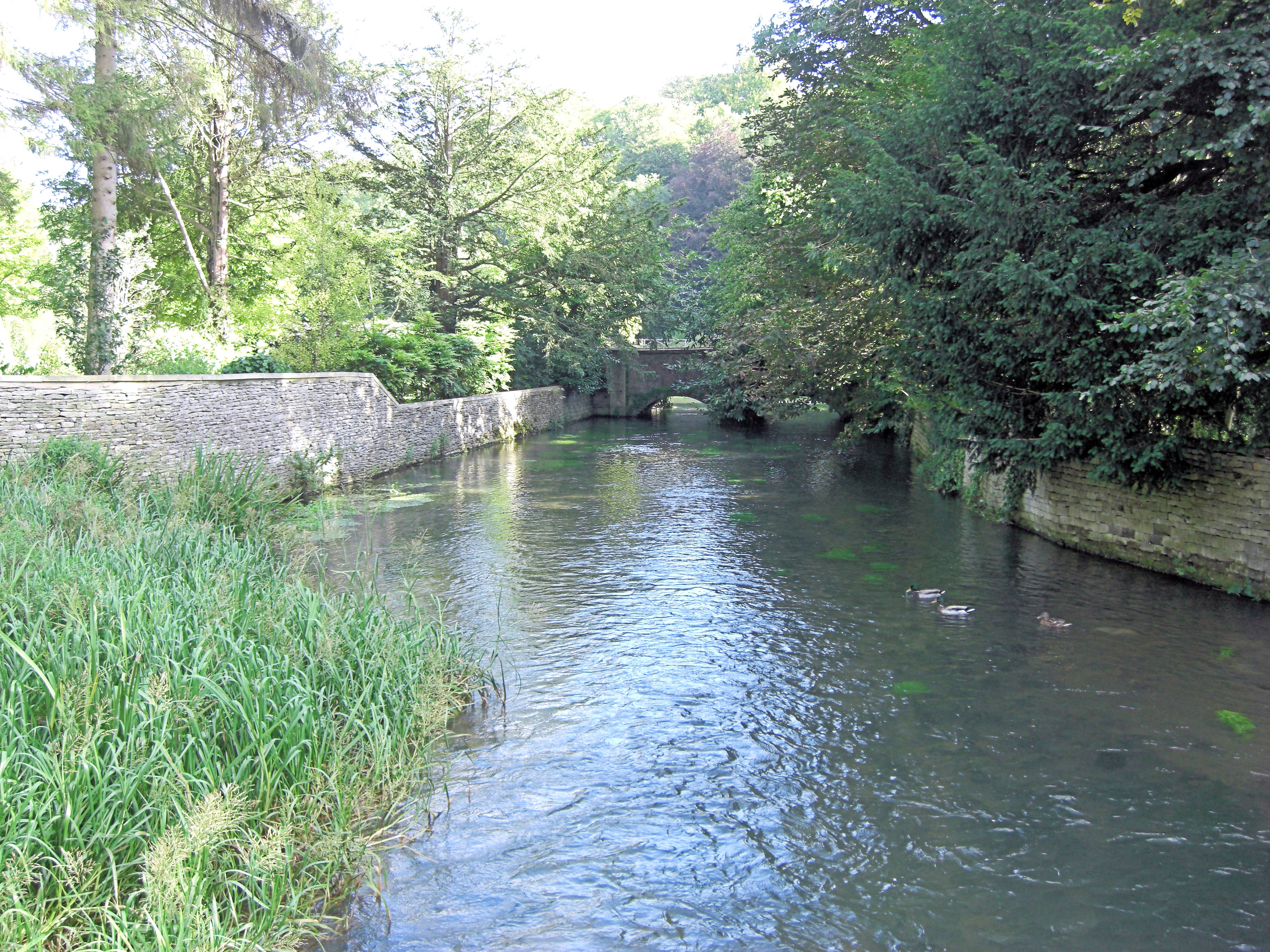
- The bridge over the River Coln which carries the access road to the house.

- Location in Gloucestershire
- 51°46′01.56″N 01°51′04.68″W
- Location: Ablington, Gloucestershire, England

Ablington Manor is a Grade I listed country house in Potlicker's Lane, Ablington within the parish of Bibury, Gloucestershire, England. The estate was owned by the Howse family, until John Coxwell purchased it in 1574. Coxwell built the house in 1590, and alterations and additions were added in around 1780. The house is a Grade I listed building.

== History ==
The Manor at Ablington was originally the property of Gloucester Abbey. After the dissolution of the monasteries, it was leased to the Howse family before being bought in 1574 by John Coxwell. He was a self-made man who had made his money in the wool trade. He raised his family's social status from middle class to being members of the gentry, and by the time he died, aged about one hundred, he owned he owned part of the Manor of Siddington and all of the Manor of Ablington. The manor house was built in about 1590, and his descendants lived there until at least 1829, when Charles Coxwell was the incumbent. After the English Civil War, the wool trade improved and a number of elegant large barns were built. The barn at Ablington Manor was one of these, and has a date stone "1727 JC", denoting the fact that the lord of the manor at the time was John Coxwell.

== The house ==
The house is built of rubble limestone with roughcast render and a stone slate roof. It is a two-storey building with attic and cellar. The house of 1590 had a three-room plan but later additions in the seventeenth century and around 1780 enlarged this, and internal remodelling was done in the late nineteenth and early twentieth centuries.

== The gardens ==
Ablington House is set in extensive grounds. The pleasure gardens are described as "consisting of terraced lawns with parterres and a sundial, shaded by specimen trees. The gardens ran down to the River Coln which flowed under a picturesque bridge on the estate and had a summerhouse on its bank. There were also croquet, archery and tennis lawns. It became a Grade I listed building on 23 January 1952.
