= Arlington, Gloucestershire =

Community in South West England

Coordinates: 51.7589°N 1.8415°W

Arlington
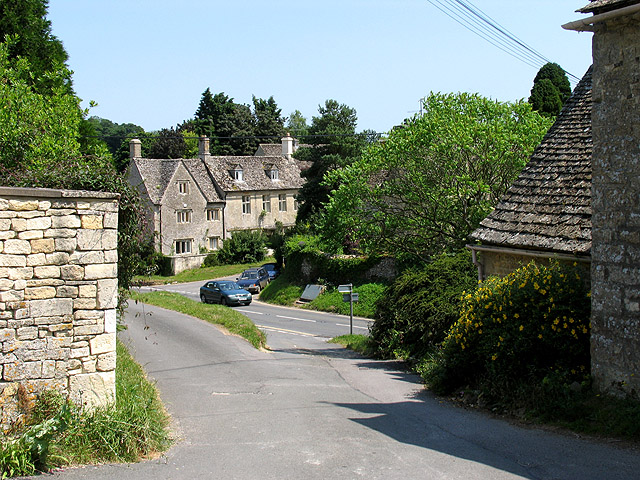

- Location within Gloucestershire
- OS grid reference: SP1006
- Civil parish: Bibury
- District: Cotswold
- Shire county: Gloucestershire
- Region: South West
- Country: England
- Sovereign state: United Kingdom
- Post town: Cirencester
- Postcode district: GL7
- Police: Gloucestershire
- Fire: Gloucestershire
- Ambulance: South Western
- UK Parliament: North Cotswolds

Arlington is a Cotswold village in the parish of Bibury, Gloucestershire, England.

== History ==
In 1066, Arlington had two mills and continued to thrive, driven by the wool trade, until the 18th century.

Arlington was the ancestral home of John Custis II, great-great-grandfather to George Washington's stepson, who emigrated to the Colony of Virginia and named his grand, four-story brick mansion (built in 1675) in Northampton County, Virginia, "Arlington" after his hometown.

== Landmarks ==
Arlington Row is a nationally notable architectural conservation area featured on the inside cover of all United Kingdom passports. Originally built in 1380 as a monastic wool store, the structure was later converted into a row of cottages for weavers in the 17th century. Its picturesque setting has made it a popular film and television location, most notably for the films Stardust and Bridget Jones's Diary.

Arlington Manor was built in the 17th century. It has an adjoining 18th century barn.

== Religious sites ==
On the green is a Baptist church built in 1833.
