= Mini-Europe =

Miniature park in Brussels, Belgium

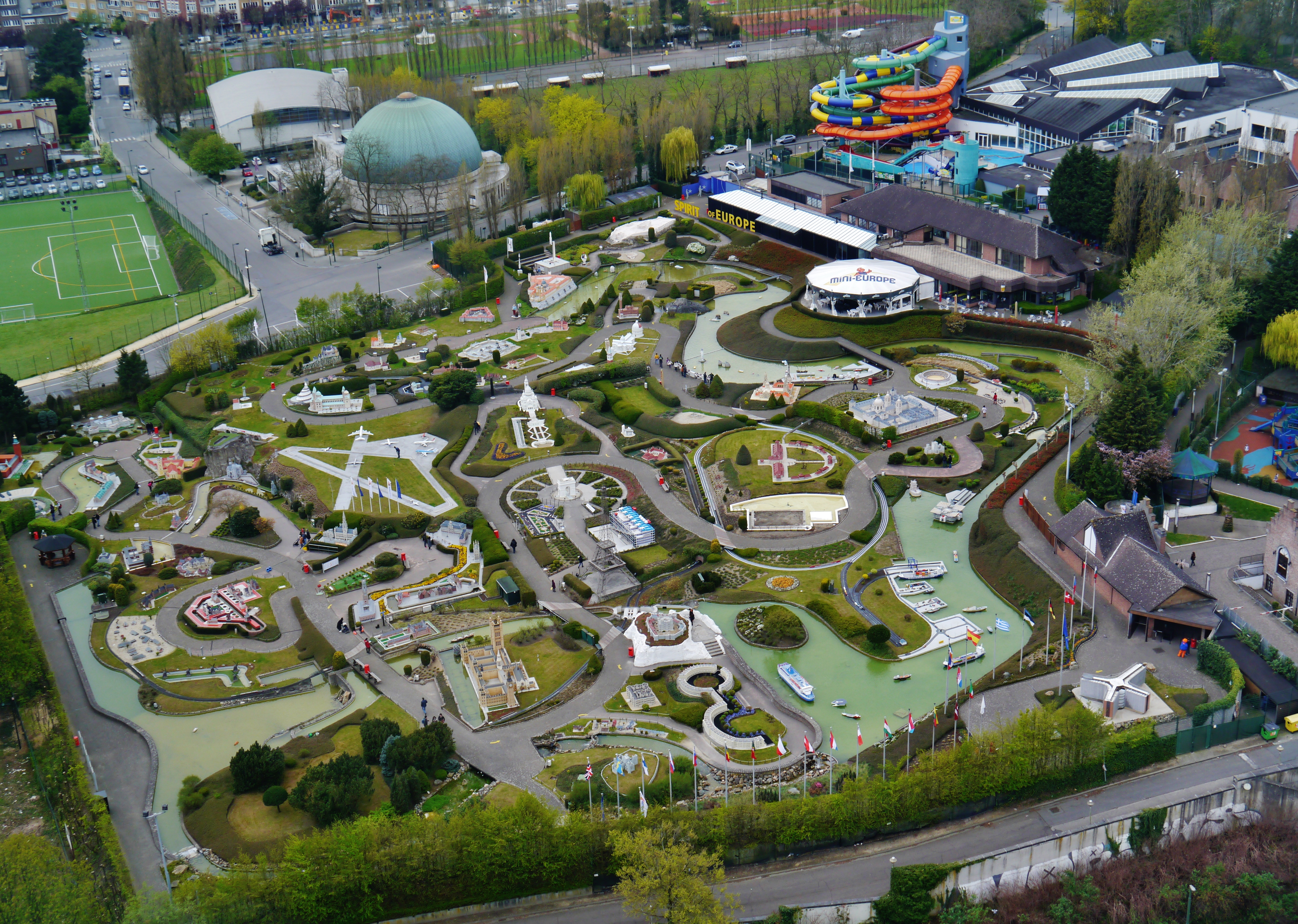
- Mini-Europe viewed from the Atomium
- Interactive map of Mini-Europe
- Location: Avenue du Football / Voetballaan 1, 1020 Laeken, City of Brussels, Brussels-Capital Region, Belgium
- Coordinates: 50°53′38″N 4°20′20″E
- Status: Operating
- Opened: 1989
- Operating season: March–October
- Website: www.minieurope.eu/en

Mini-Europe is a miniature park located in the Bruparck entertainment park, at the foot of the Atomium, in Brussels, Belgium. Mini-Europe has reproductions of monuments in the European Union and other countries within the continent of Europe on display, at a scale of 1:25. Roughly 80 cities and 350 buildings are represented. Mini-Europe receives 350,000 visitors per year and has a turnover of €4 million.

Mini-Europe is the brainchild of Johannes A. Lorijn, who founded similar miniature parks in Austria and Spain. The park contains live action models such as trains, mills, an erupting Mount Vesuvius, and cable cars. A guide gives the details on all the monuments. At the end of the visit, the Spirit of Europe exhibition gives an interactive overview of the EU in the form of multimedia games.

The park is built on an area of 24,000 m^{2} (300,000 sq ft). The initial investment was of 50 million Belgian francs in 1989, (Note: This amount is roughly equivalent to €12 million in 2025 when taking into account inflation.) on its inauguration by then-Prince Philippe of Belgium.

== History ==
=== Inception, opening and growth ===
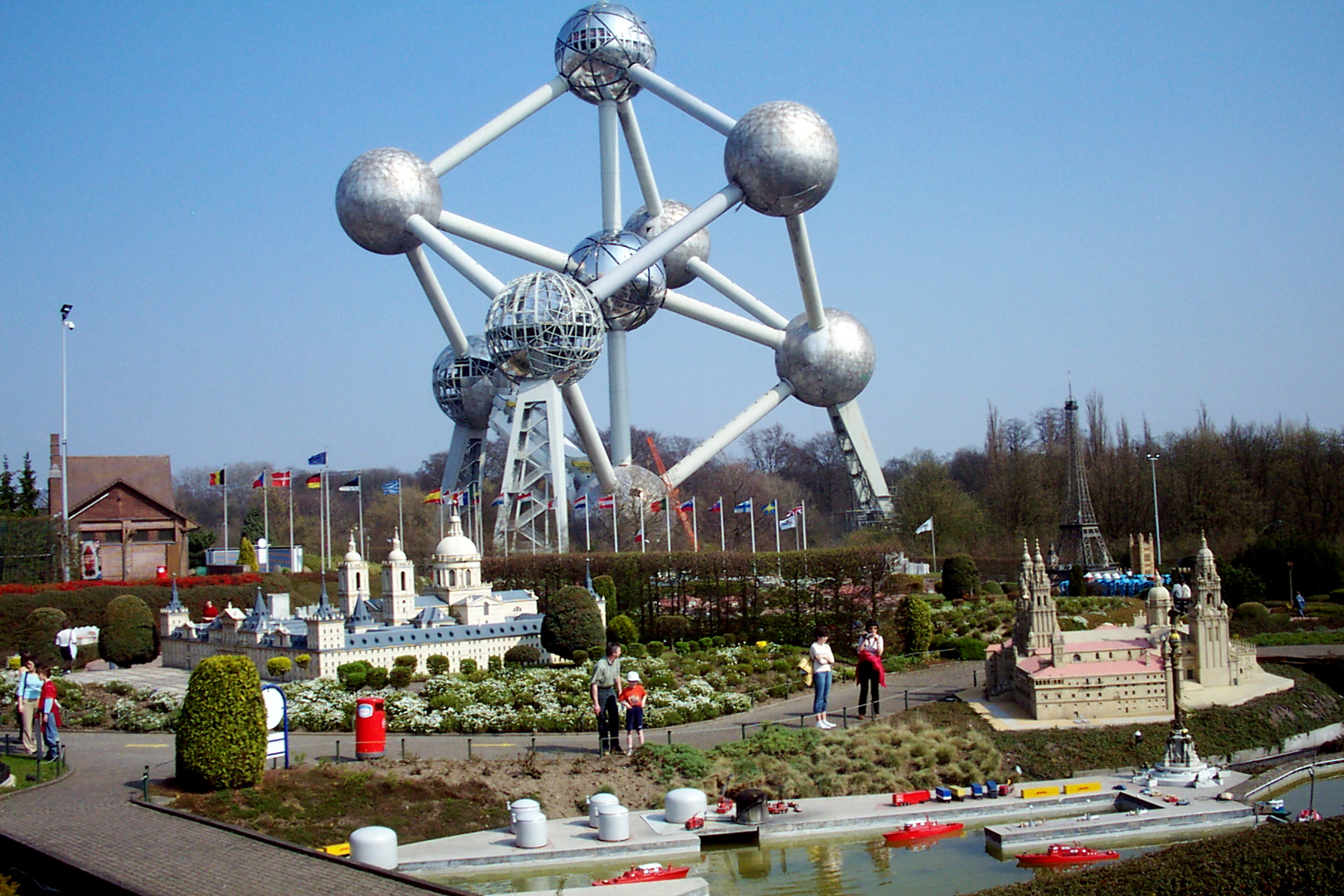
Mini-Europe in 2005, with the Atomium under renovation

The original idea for the park originated from the Dutch businessman Johannes A. Lorijn who, in 1986, came up with the idea of creating a miniature park on the Heysel/Heizel site in Brussels. After his association with the Société régionale d'Investissement bruxelloise, which took a stake in the miniature park, he withdrew from the project following bad business fortunes. The park having already been sketched out and the models ordered, the Société approached the Walibi group, headed by Eddy Meeùs, about becoming a joint shareholder by taking over the designer's shares. In June 1988, Walibi's directors bought the business.

The revised plan consisted of a new park section at Walibi Belgium in Wavre, but that idea proved too large for the amusement park, so a search was made for a location where it could open as a separate park. Mini-Europe was eventually built on the old site of the Meli Heysel/Heizel amusement park, a branch of the West Flanders-based Meli Park, which had closed in 1986. The initial investment was of 50 million Belgian francs. Mini-Europe opened in 1989 as part of Brussels' Bruparck entertainment park, which also housed a branch of the Kinepolis cinema chain and the Océade tropical water park, which closed in 2018. Then-Prince Philippe of Belgium inaugurated the site on 1 June 1989 with Thierry Meeùs at the helm.

Mini-Europe proved less profitable than the theme parks owned by the Meeùs family. The turnover was between 100 million and 120 million Belgian francs in the first few years. (Note: Equivalent to €3 million and €4 million in 2025 when taking into account inflation.) The Escurial Monastery, the Palace of Westminster, the Nyhavn in Copenhagen, the Grand-Place/Grote Markt, the Arc de Triomphe, the Leaning Tower of Pisa, the Parthenon and the Brandenburg Gate were among the first models visible to visitors. Mini-Europe welcomed 300,000 visitors in 1998. With 350,000 visitors in 2012 and €4 million in turnover, Mini-Europe has become one of Brussels' leading attractions. In 2018, 390,000 admissions were recorded.

=== NEO project and potential closure ===
Mini-Europe and Océade were threatened by the NEO project at the Heysel—a large shopping, residential and office project—and were originally due to close their doors at the end of 2013. This deadline was extended for a first time until the end of 2016. Océade ultimately closed in October 2018. Mini-Europe appeared to have an approved demolition permit in 2019. The 2020 season, marked by the COVID-19 pandemic in Belgium, was initially announced as the park's last. Finally, an agreement was reached at the beginning of 2021 to extend operations until the arrival of NEO and to guarantee Mini-Europe's inclusion in NEO.

== Exhibits ==
=== Building the monuments ===
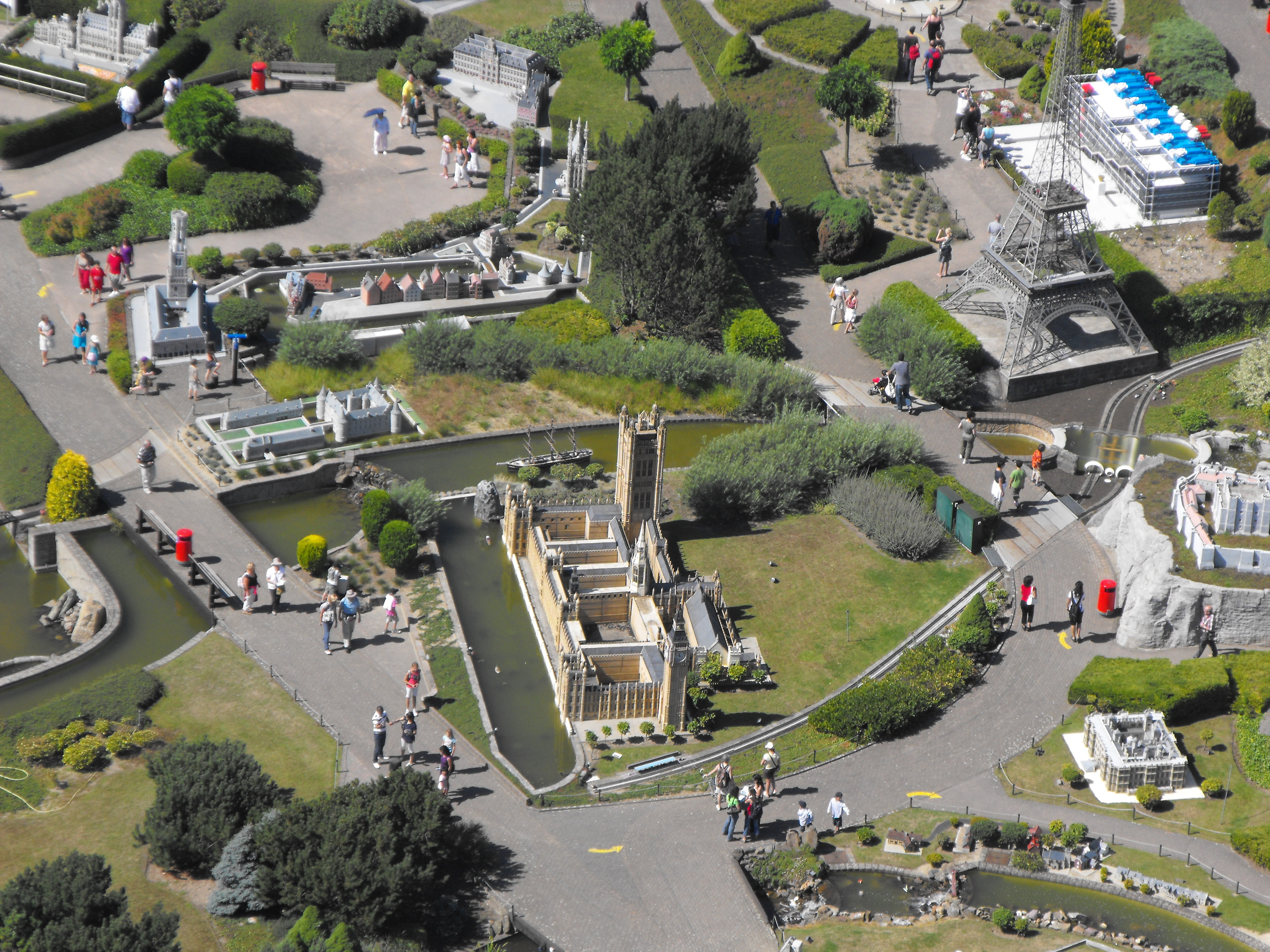
Part of the site, viewed from the Atomium

The monuments exposed are selected for the quality of their architecture or their European symbolism. Numbering 165, the designers and model makers are Belgian, British, Dutch, French, German, Portuguese and Spanish. Most of the monuments were made using moulds. The pieces are constructed from a variety of materials, then copied by silicone moulding. The final copy used to be cast from epoxy resin, but nowadays polyester is used. Three of the monuments were made out of natural stone (e.g. the Leaning Tower of Pisa and the Château de Chenonceau, in marble). A computer-assisted milling procedure was used for two of the models. After painting, the monuments are installed on site, together with decorations and lighting.

Many of the monuments were financed by European countries or regions. For instance, in 2008, Mini-Europe received: from the Hungarian Government, the gigantic Széchenyi Bath in Budapest (8 by 6 metres (26 by 20 ft) at Mini-Europe); from the Bulgarian Government, the Rila Monastery; and from the Government of Saxony-Anhalt (Germany), the Jahrtausendturm in Magdeburg. In collaboration with the Slovenian Government, Prešeren Square in Ljubljana was inaugurated with several Slovenian symbols. The Brussels Grand-Place/Grote Markt model cost €375,000 to make. The Cathedral of Santiago de Compostela required more than 24,000 hours of work. Until 2018, no monuments from Rome were represented. The inauguration of the Trevi Fountain in 2019 to mark Mini-Europe's 30th anniversary filled this gap.

=== Animations ===
In addition to static models, the park brings the site to life with a variety of animations: trains, windmills, sounds, the eruption of Mount Vesuvius, the fall of the Berlin Wall, gondolas in Venice, wire-guided lorries, etc. These animations are industrial prototypes designed to withstand the many hours of operation and the different seasons (frost, rain, heat).

=== Gardens ===
Ground cover plants, dwarf trees, bonsais and grafted trees are used alongside miniature monuments, and the paths are adorned with bushes and flowers. These paths are accessible for Persons with Reduced Mobility (PRM).

=== Spirit of Europe ===
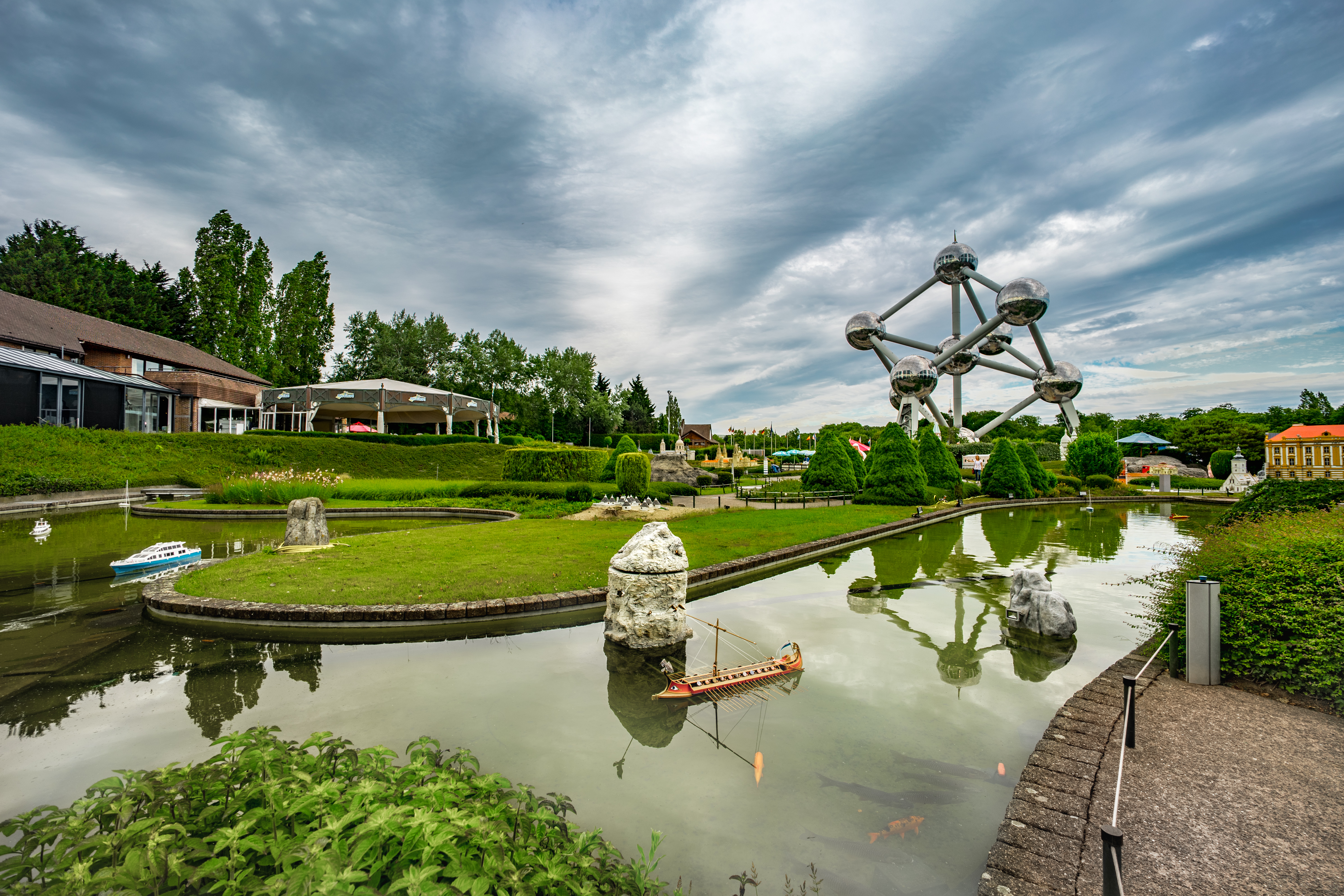
The Spirit of Europe, with a view of the Atomium

At the end of the tour, the area reserved for the European Union gives a brief presentation of its history, its successes, its culture, the workings of its institutions, the single market and the reasons for enlargement, usually in the form of multimedia games. There are also many educational projects for schools. For all these activities, Mini-Europe has received the moral support of the European Commission and the European Parliament.

== List of models ==
=== Austria ===
- Melk Abbey

=== Belgium ===
- Grand-Place/Grote Markt (City Hall, City Museum, Flower Carpet and guild houses), Brussels
- Belfry, Bruges
- Town Hall, Leuven
- Castle of Vêves, Celles
- Citadel and Collegiate Church of Our Lady, Dinant
- Berlaymont building, Brussels
- Graslei (street) and Rabot, Ghent
- Alden Biesen Castle, Rijkhoven
- Grote Markt (City Hall, Brabo Fountain and guild houses), Antwerp
- Curtius House, Liège

=== Bulgaria ===
- Rila Monastery, Rila Mountains

=== Croatia ===
- St. Mark's Church, Zagreb

=== Cyprus ===
- Ancient Greek theatre, Kourion

=== Czech Republic ===
- Old Town Hall, Prague

=== Denmark ===
- Viking ring fort
- Nyhavn waterfront, Copenhagen
- Børsen (old stock exchange), Copenhagen

=== Estonia ===
- Great Coastal Gate and Fat Margaret Tower, Tallinn

=== Finland ===
- St. Olaf's Castle, Savonlinna

=== France ===
- Eiffel Tower, Paris
- Arc de Triomphe, Paris
- Basilica of the Sacré Cœur, Paris
- Centre Georges Pompidou, Paris
- Notre Dame du Haut, Ronchamp
- Clos Vougeot, near Dijon
- Château de Chenonceau, Loire Valley
- Royal Saltworks, Arc-et-Senans

=== Germany ===
- Speyer Cathedral
- Eltz Castle, Wierschem
- Holstentor, Burgtor and Salzspeicher, Lübeck
- Brandenburg Gate and Berlin Wall, Berlin
- Bonngasse (street) with Beethoven's birth house, Bonn
- Wies Pilgrimage Church
- Porta Nigra, Trier
- Osthofentor, Soest
- Jahrtausendturm, Magdeburg

=== Greece ===
- Acropolis, Athens
- Traditional village, Santorini

=== Hungary ===
- Széchenyi Bath, Budapest

=== Ireland ===
- Glendalough monastery, County Wicklow
- Rock of Cashel, County Tipperary
- Gallarus Oratory, County Kerry

=== Italy ===
- Piazza dei Miracoli (Leaning Tower, Duomo and Baptistry), Pisa
- Trevi Fountain, Rome
- Doge's Palace and St Mark's Campanile, Venice
- Palazzo Pubblico, Siena
- Villa Capra (La Rotonda), Vicenza
- Trulli of Alberobello
- Mount Vesuvius

=== Latvia ===
- Freedom Monument, Riga

=== Lithuania ===
- Vilnius University campus, Vilnius

=== Luxembourg ===
- Adolphe Bridge, Luxembourg City

=== Malta ===
- Mnajdra temple, Qrendi

=== Netherlands ===
- Munttoren and Montelbaanstoren, Amsterdam
- City Hall, Maastricht
- Hoensbroek Castle, Hoensbroek
- Church and houses, Ootmarsum
- Abbey and Kloveniersdoelen, Middelburg
- Museum village of Orvelte
- Weigh House and Tax Tower, Alkmaar
- Windmills, Kinderdijk
- Hoofdtoren and Oude Doelenkade street, Hoorn
- Town Hall, Veere

=== Poland ===
- Artus Court, Gdańsk
- Monument to Fallen Shipyard Workers, Gdańsk
- Palace on the Isle, Warsaw
- Statue of Frédéric Chopin, Warsaw

=== Portugal ===
- Belém Tower, Lisbon
- Castle of Guimarães
- Ribeira, Porto
- Traditional village of the Algarve
- Oceanarium, Lisbon

=== Romania ===
- Mogoșoaia Palace, near Bucharest

=== Slovakia ===
- Blue Church, Bratislava

=== Slovenia ===
- Prešeren Square with Tromostovje, Ljubljana

=== Spain ===
- Cathedral of Santiago de Compostela
- El Escorial, San Lorenzo de El Escorial
- Plaza de Toros, Seville
- Christopher Columbus monument, Barcelona
- Landscape with windmills, La Mancha

=== Sweden ===
- City Hall, Stockholm

=== Ukraine ===
- Independence Monument, Kyiv

=== United Kingdom ===
- Houses of Parliament and Elizabeth Tower, London
- Stratford-upon-Avon (Shakespeare's birth house, Anne Hathaway's cottage, etc.)
- Longleat House, Wiltshire
- Royal Crescent and Circus, Bath
- Dover Castle
- Arlington Row, Bibury

=== Other ===
- Ariane 5
- Pride of Dover ferry
- An airport
- A Ferris wheel
- A North Sea oil platform
- TGV train
- Calypso (Jacques Cousteau's ship)
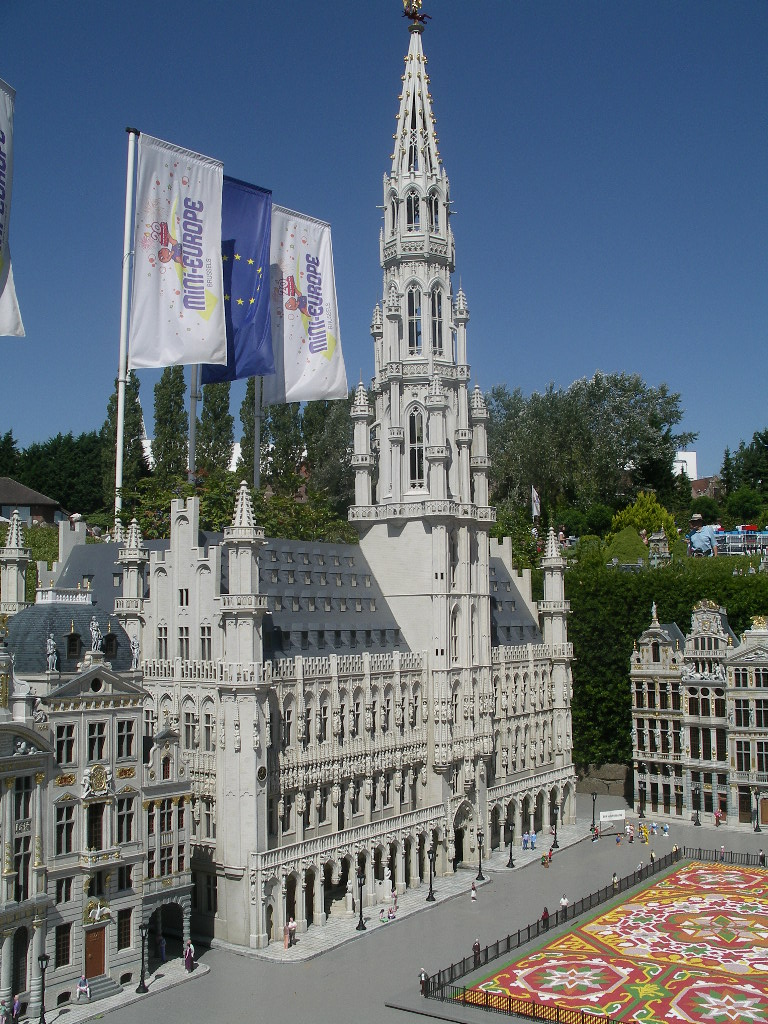
Grand-Place/Grote Markt, Brussels (Belgium)

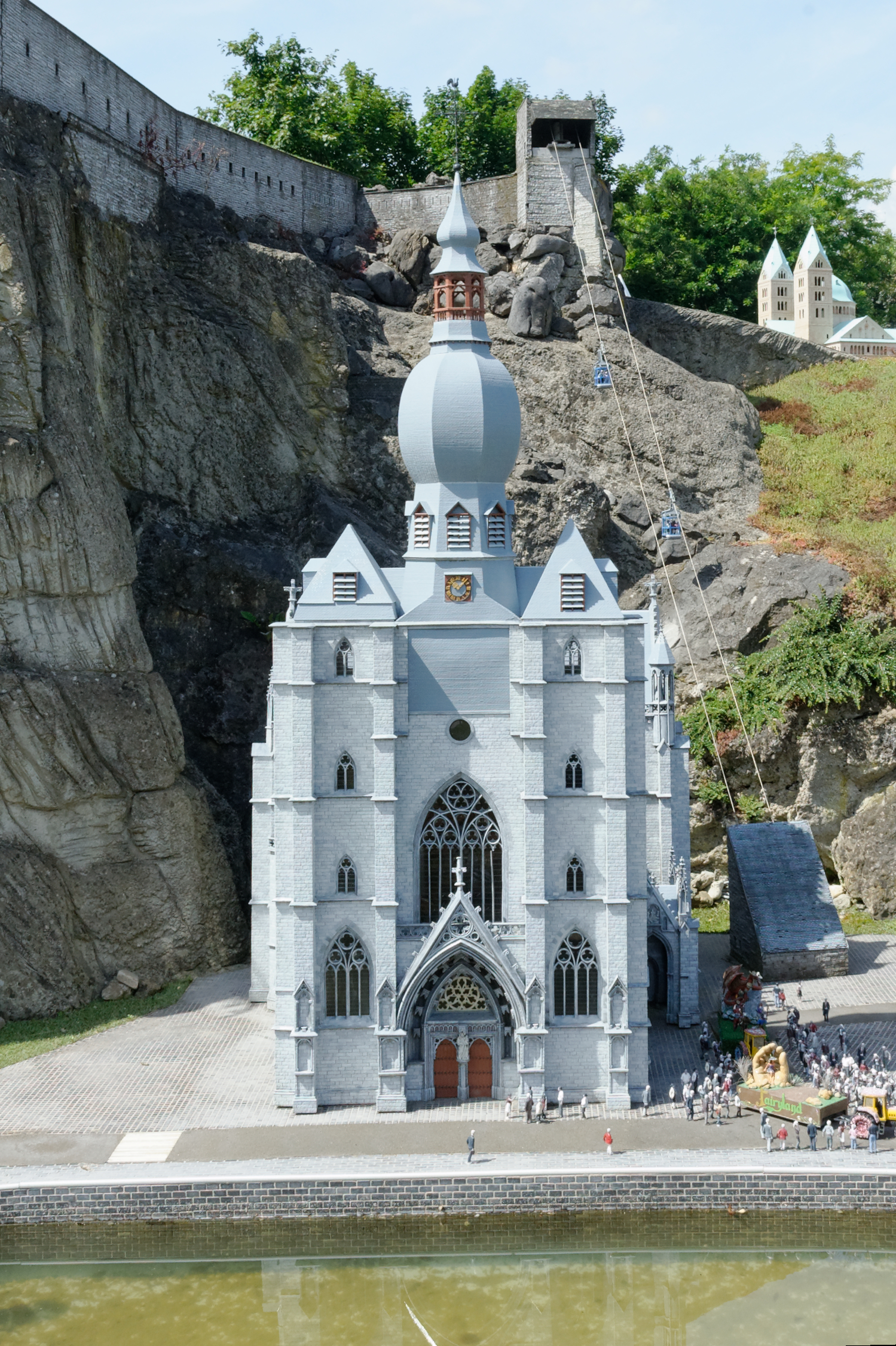
Collegiate Church of Our Lady, Dinant (Belgium)

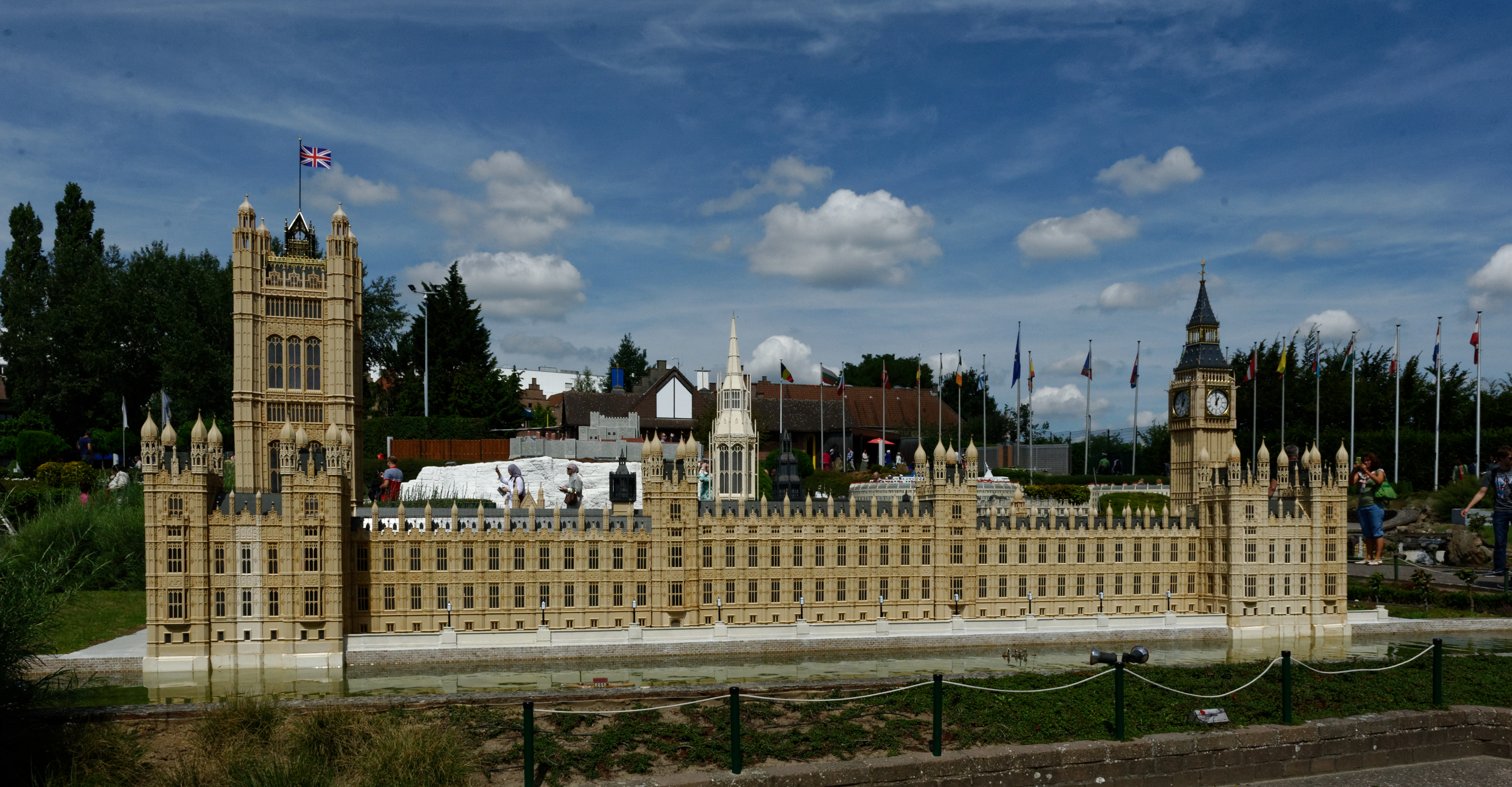
Palace of Westminster and Elizabeth Tower, London (United Kingdom)

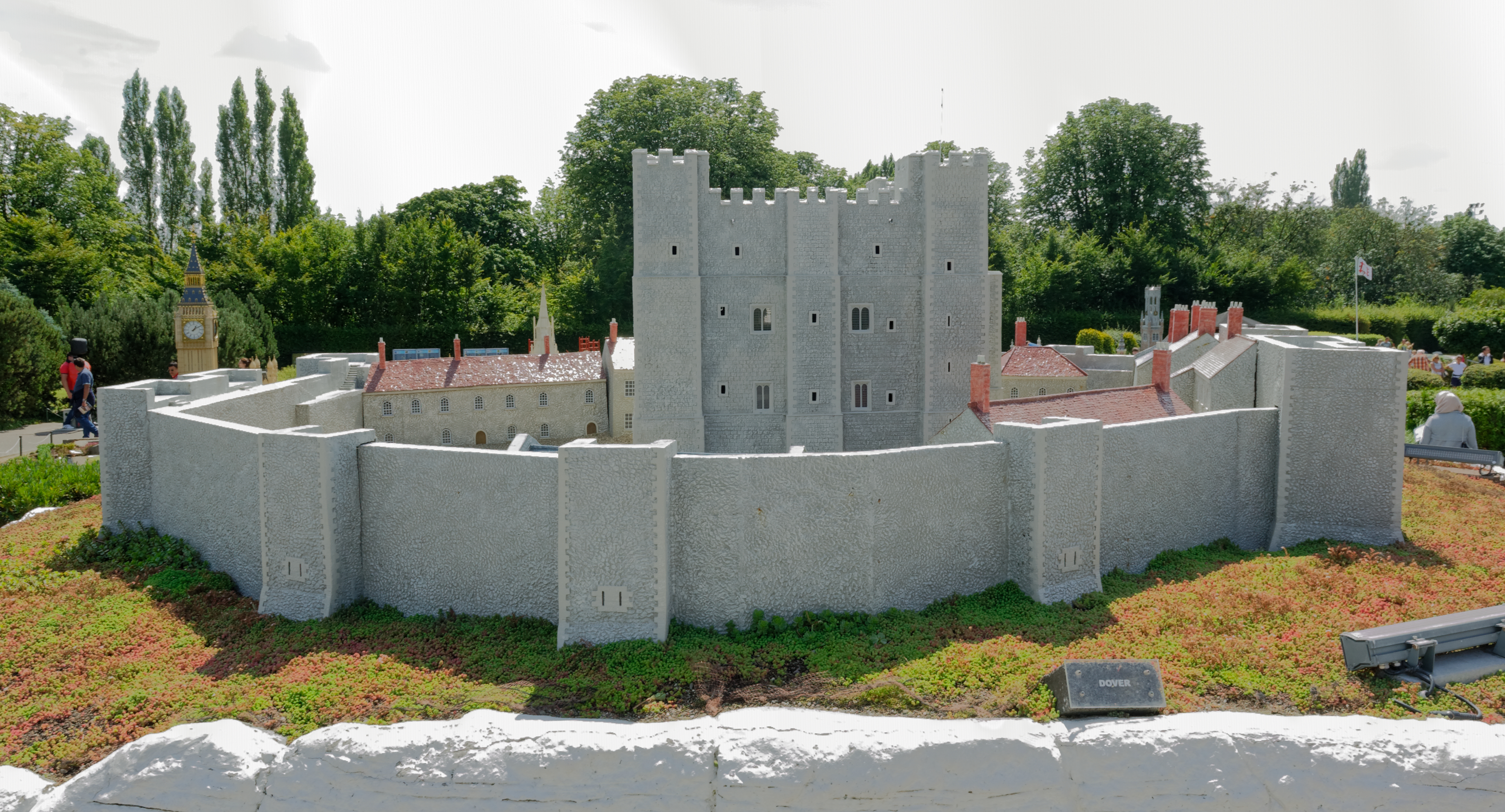
Dover Castle, Dover (United Kingdom)

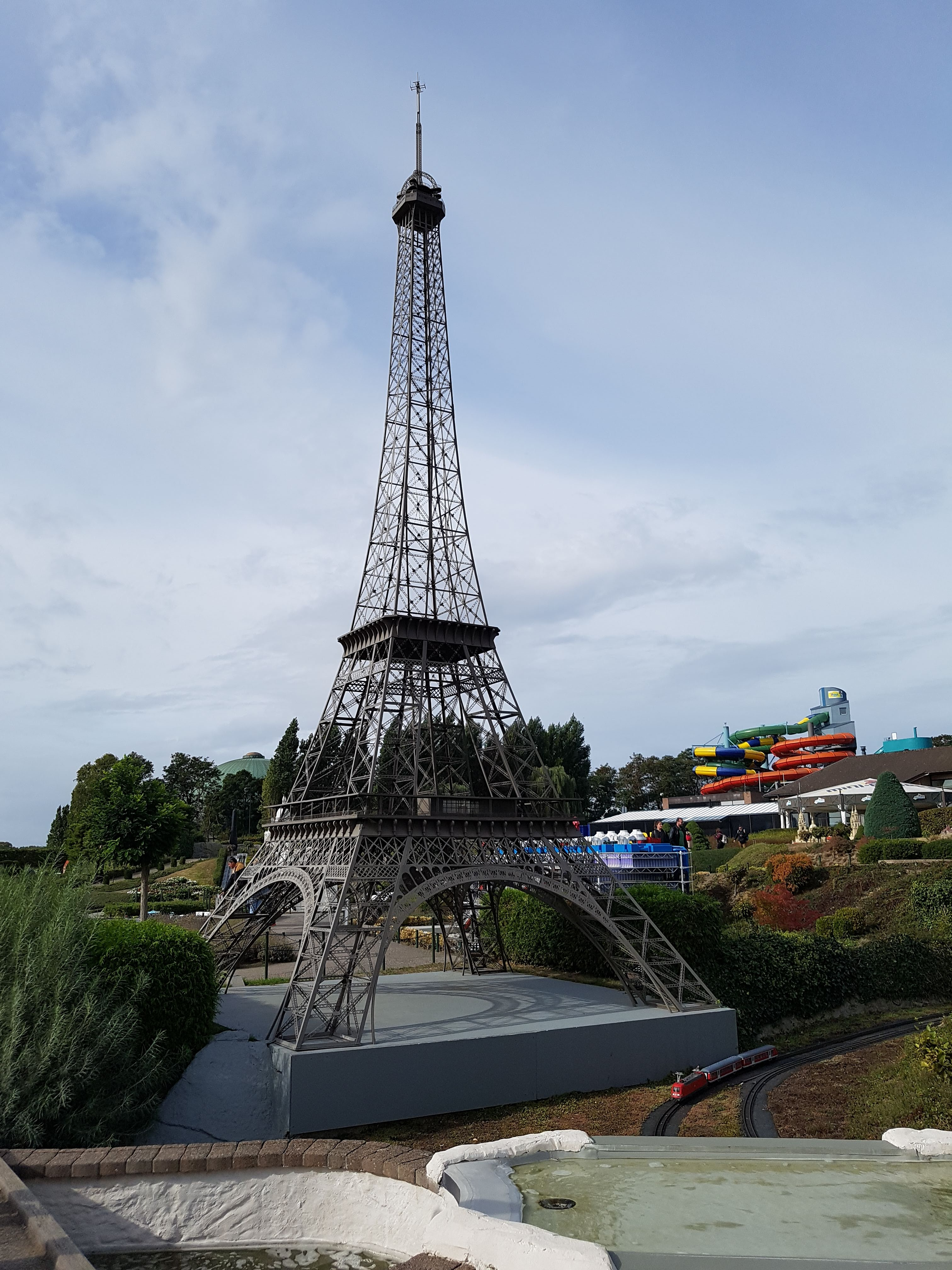
Eiffel Tower, Paris (France)

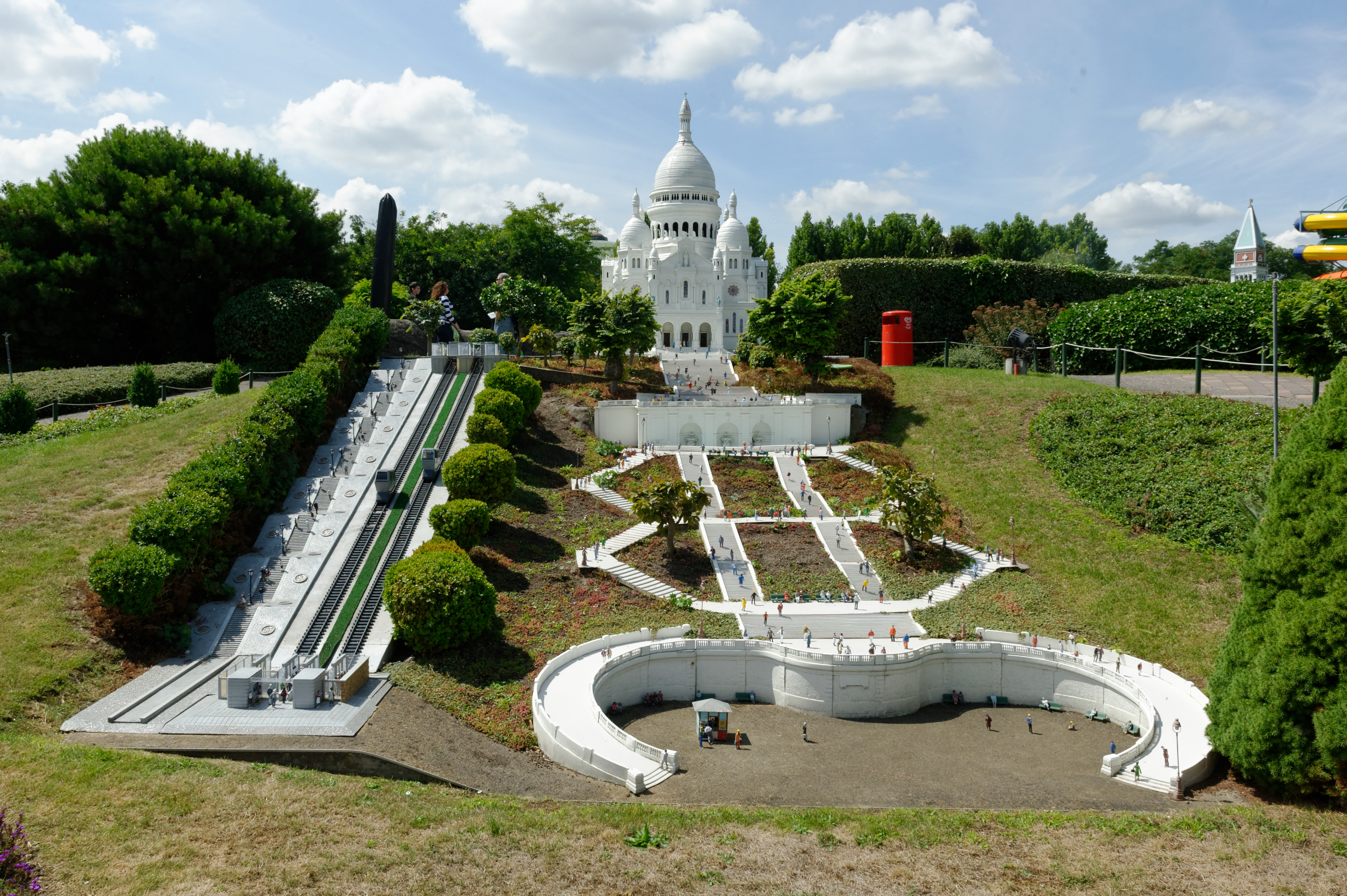
Sacré Cœur, Paris (France)

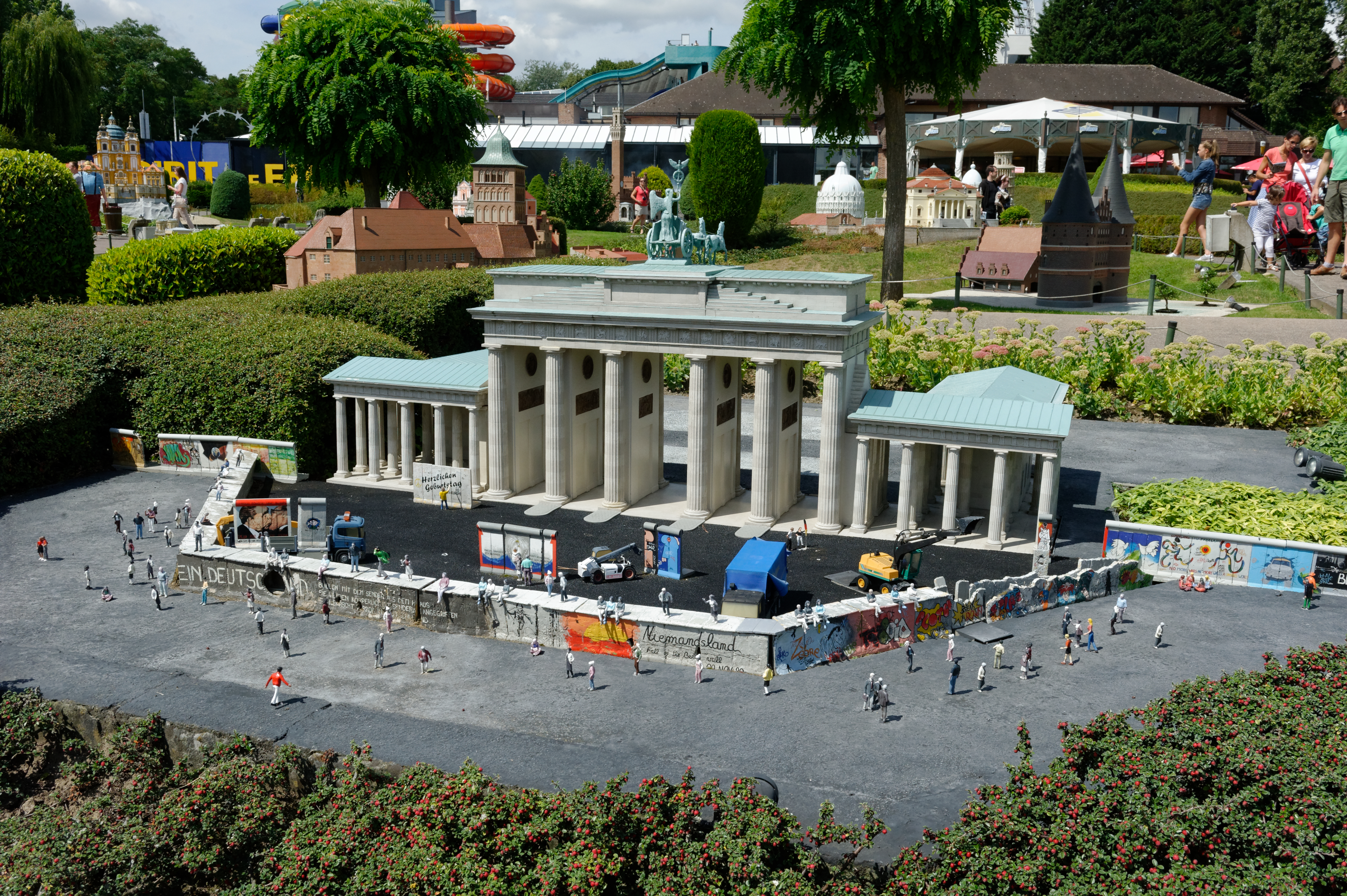
Brandenburg Gate and Berlin Wall, Berlin (Germany)

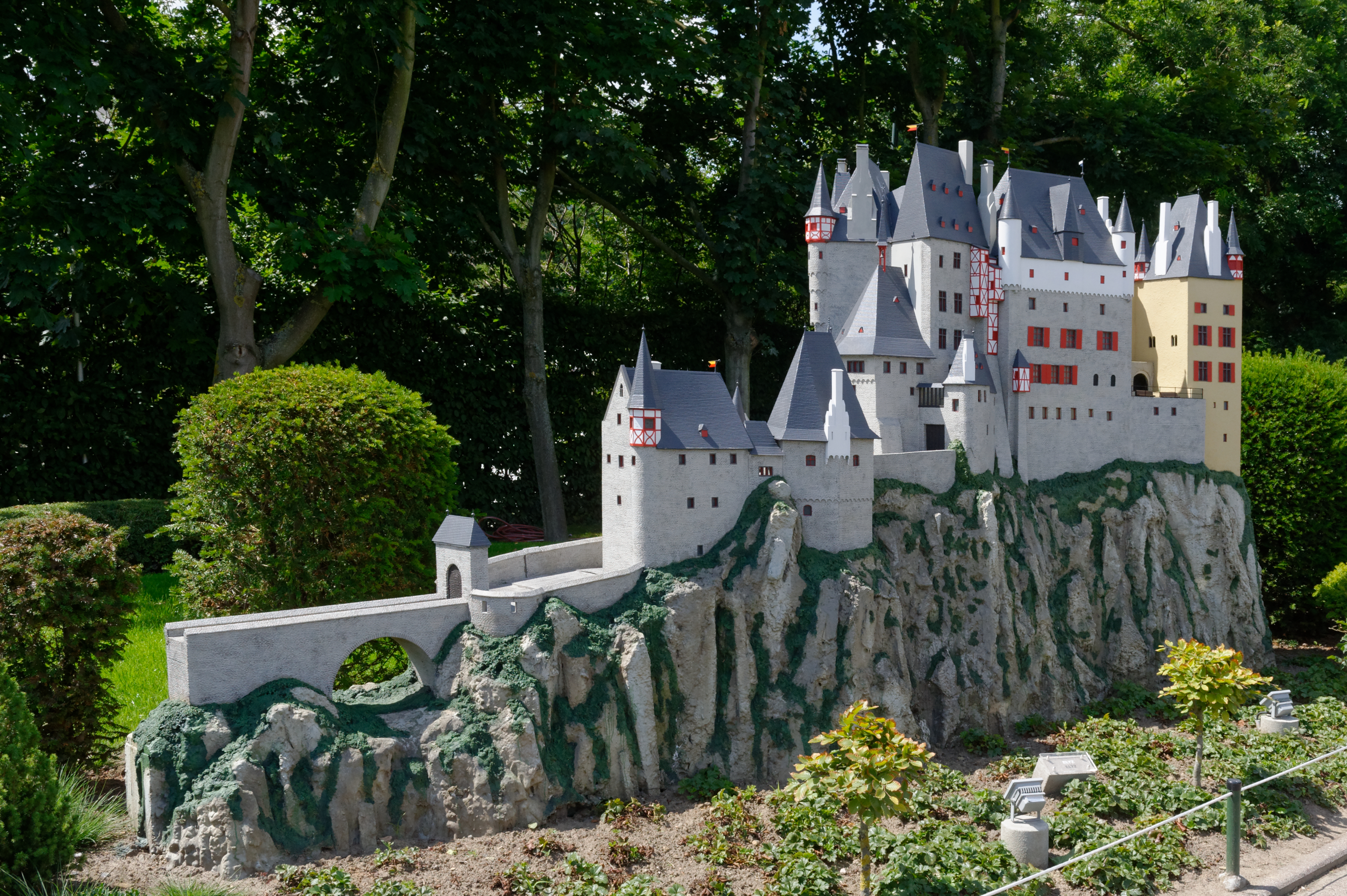
Eltz Castle, Wierschem (Germany)

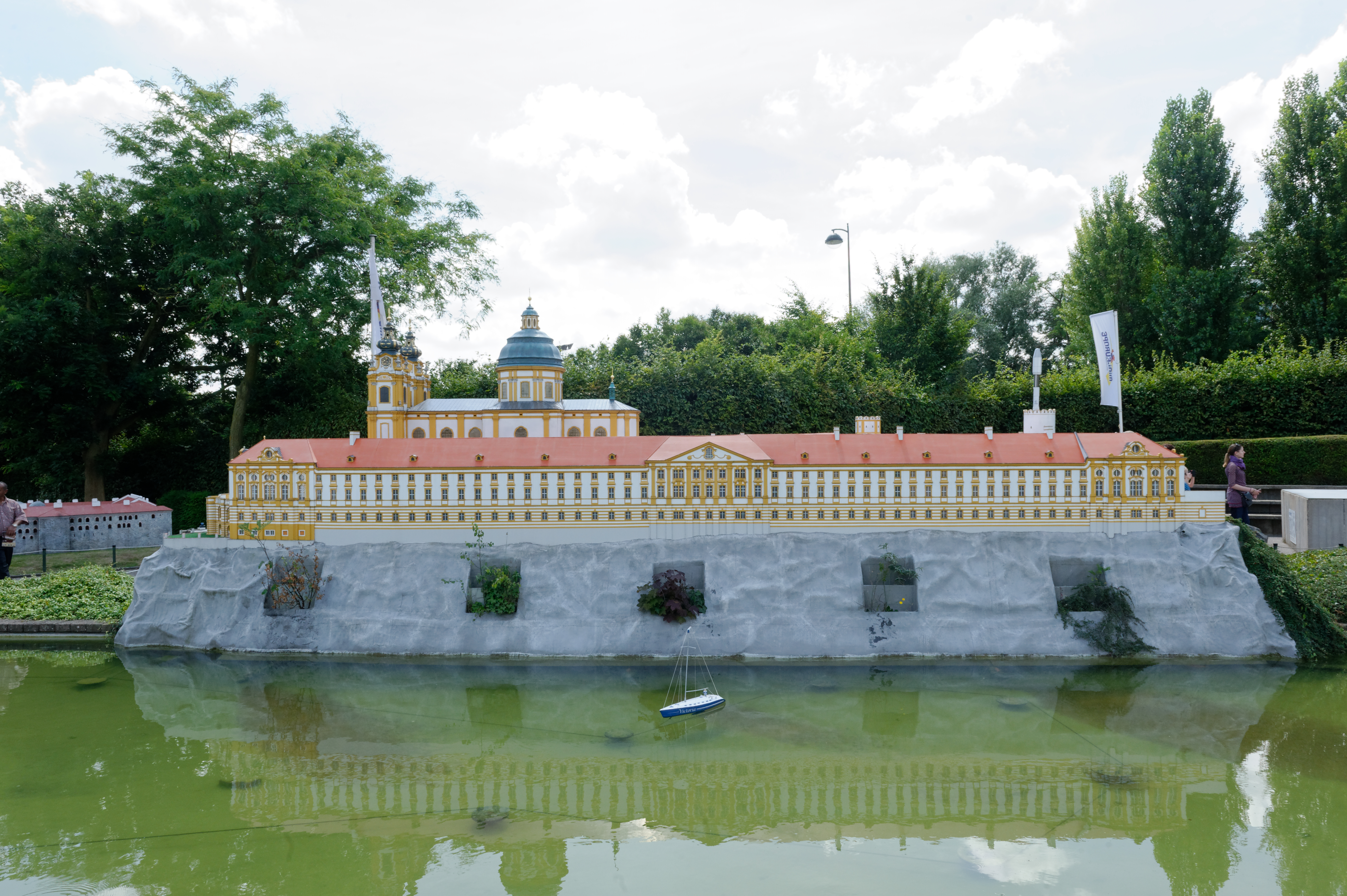
Melk Abbey, Melk (Austria)

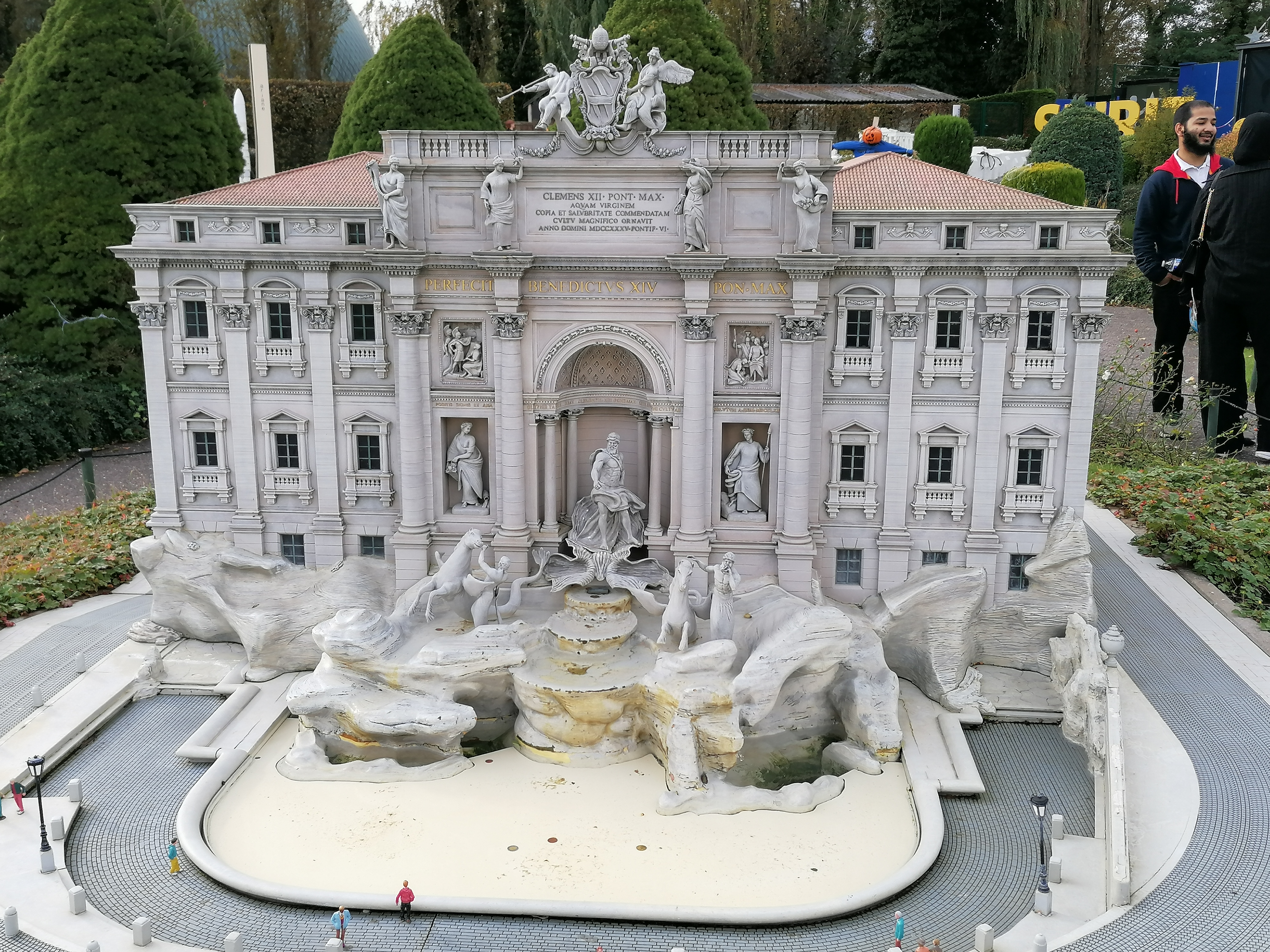
Trevi Fountain, Rome (Italy)

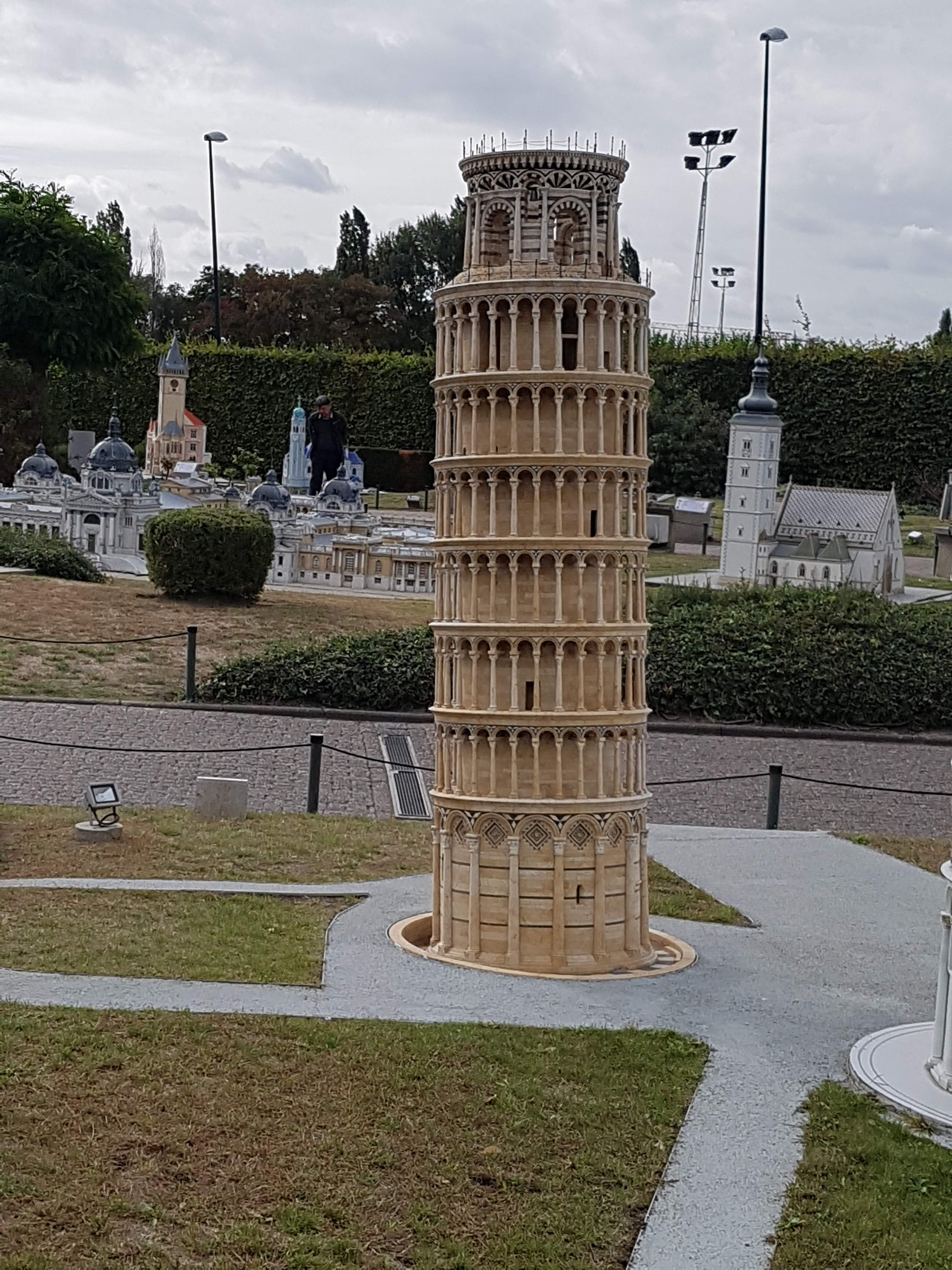
Leaning Tower, Pisa (Italy)

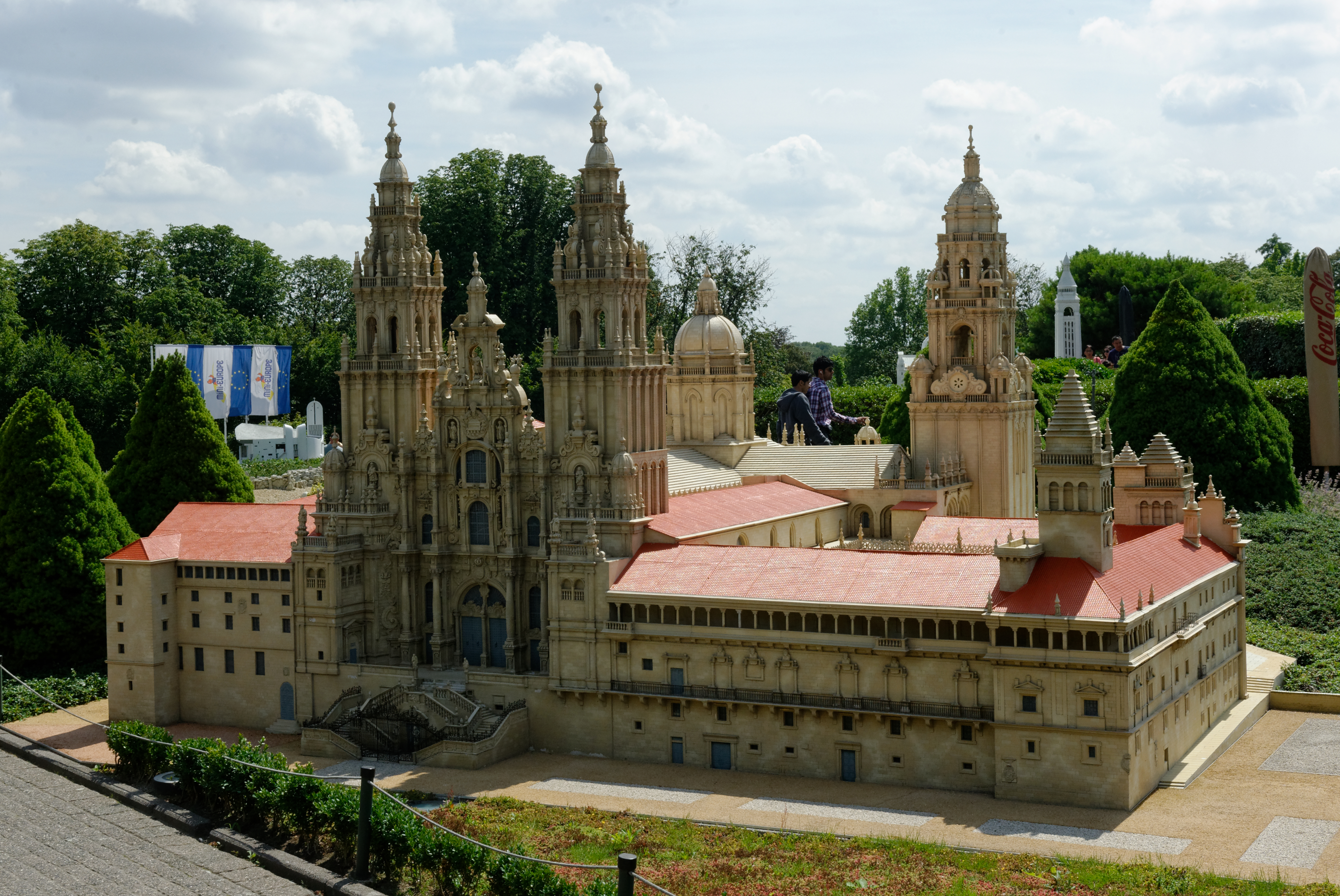
Santiago de Compostela Cathedral, Santiago de Compostela (Spain)

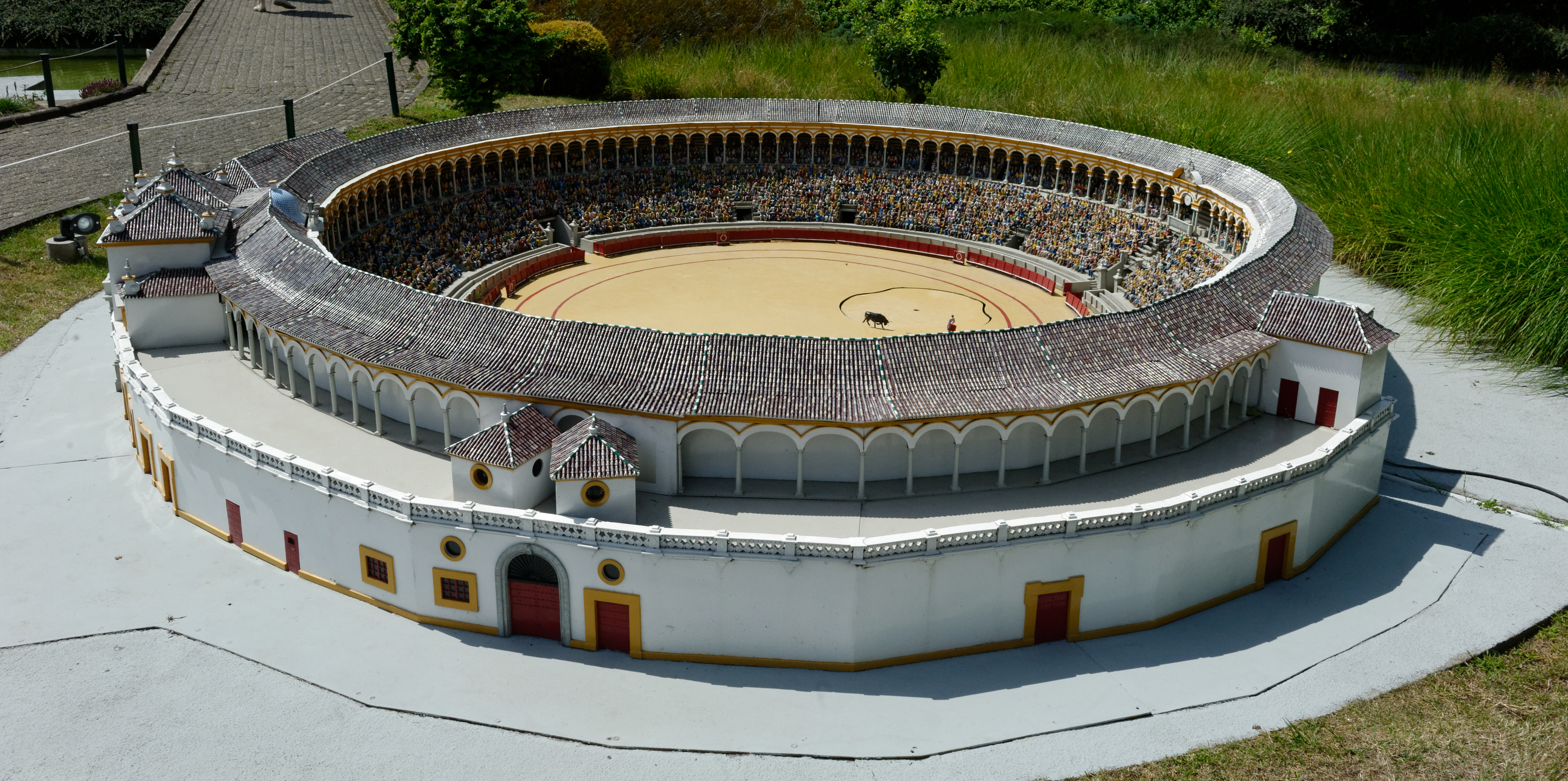
Maestranza, Seville (Spain)

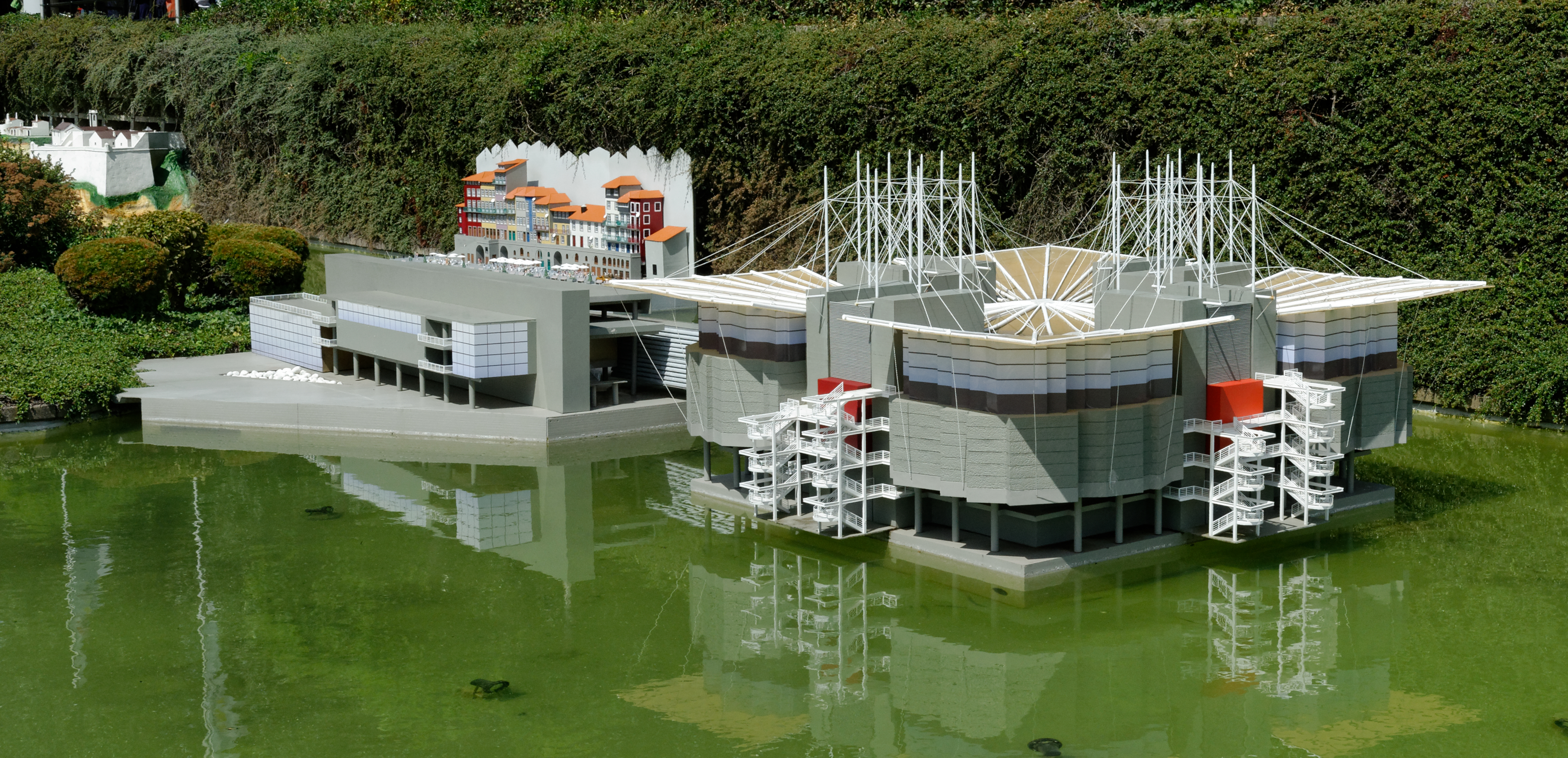
Oceanarium, Lisbon (Portugal)

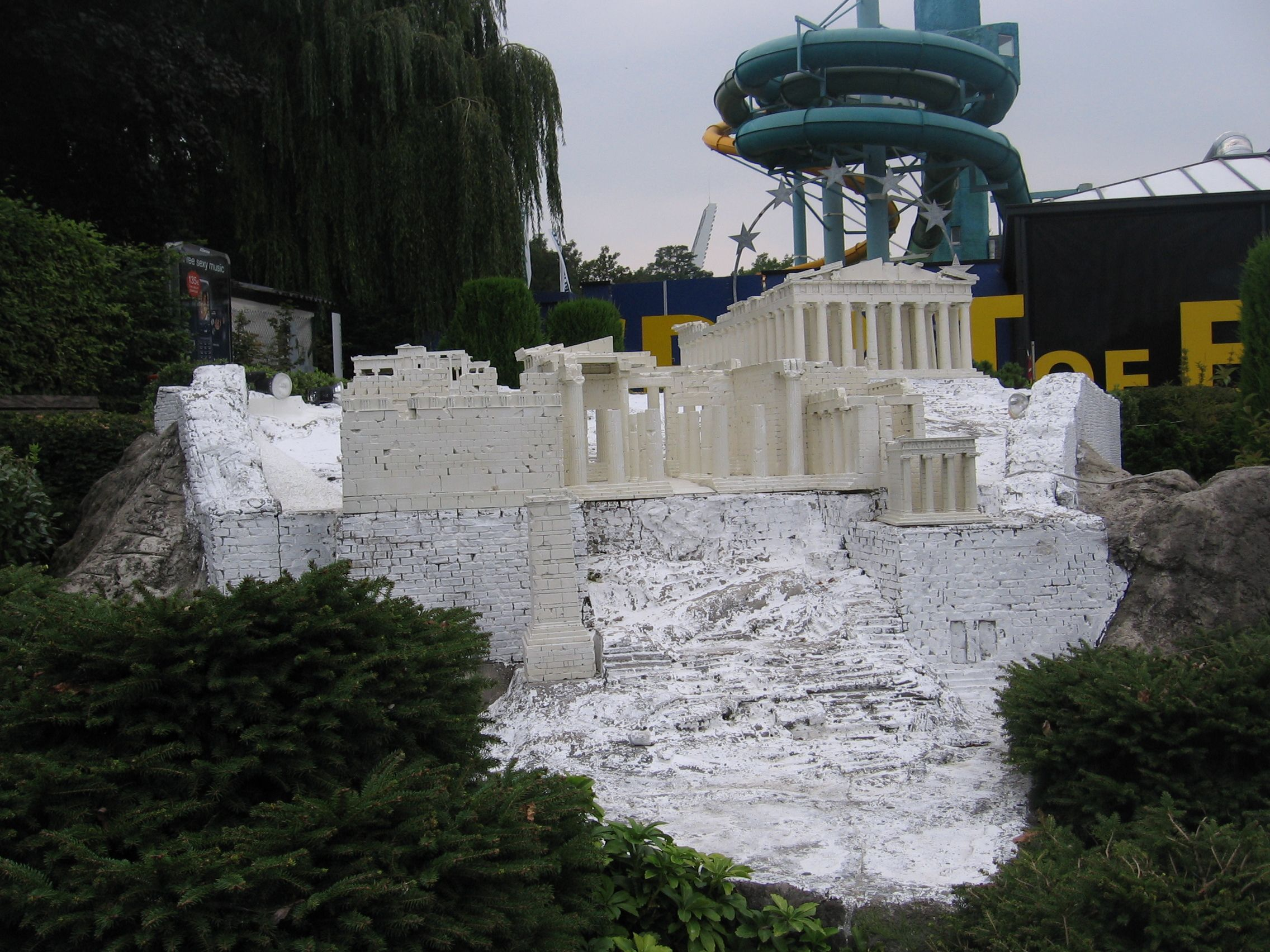
Acropolis, Athens (Greece)

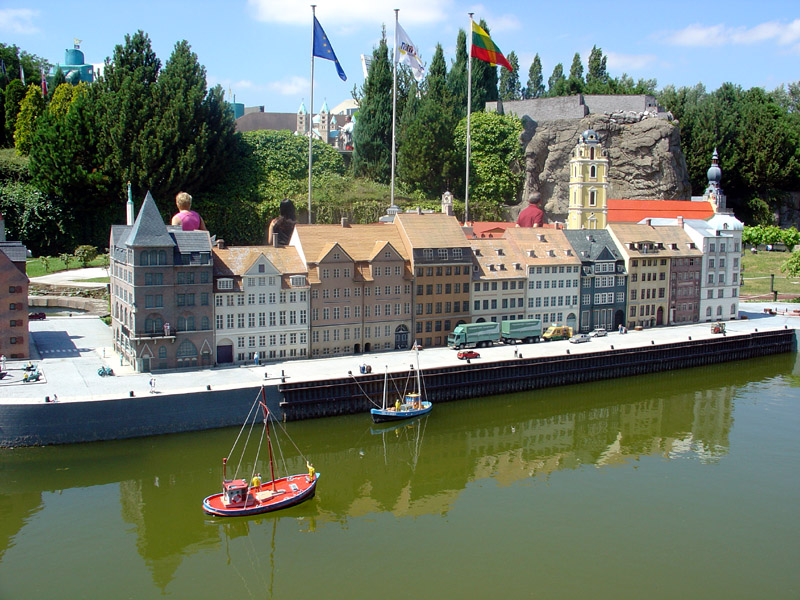
Nyhavn waterfront, Copenhagen (Denmark)

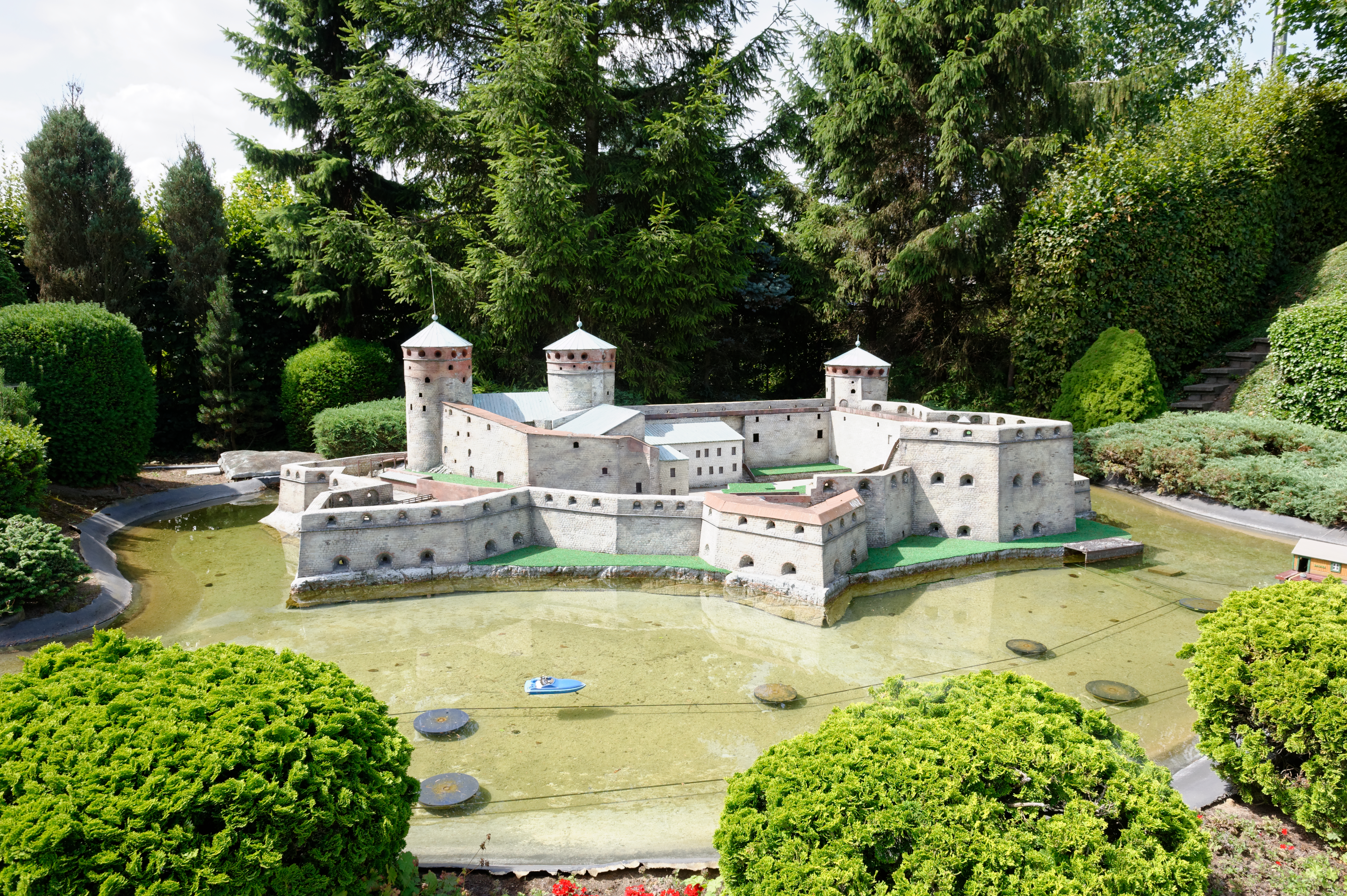
St. Olaf's Castle, Savonlinna (Finland)

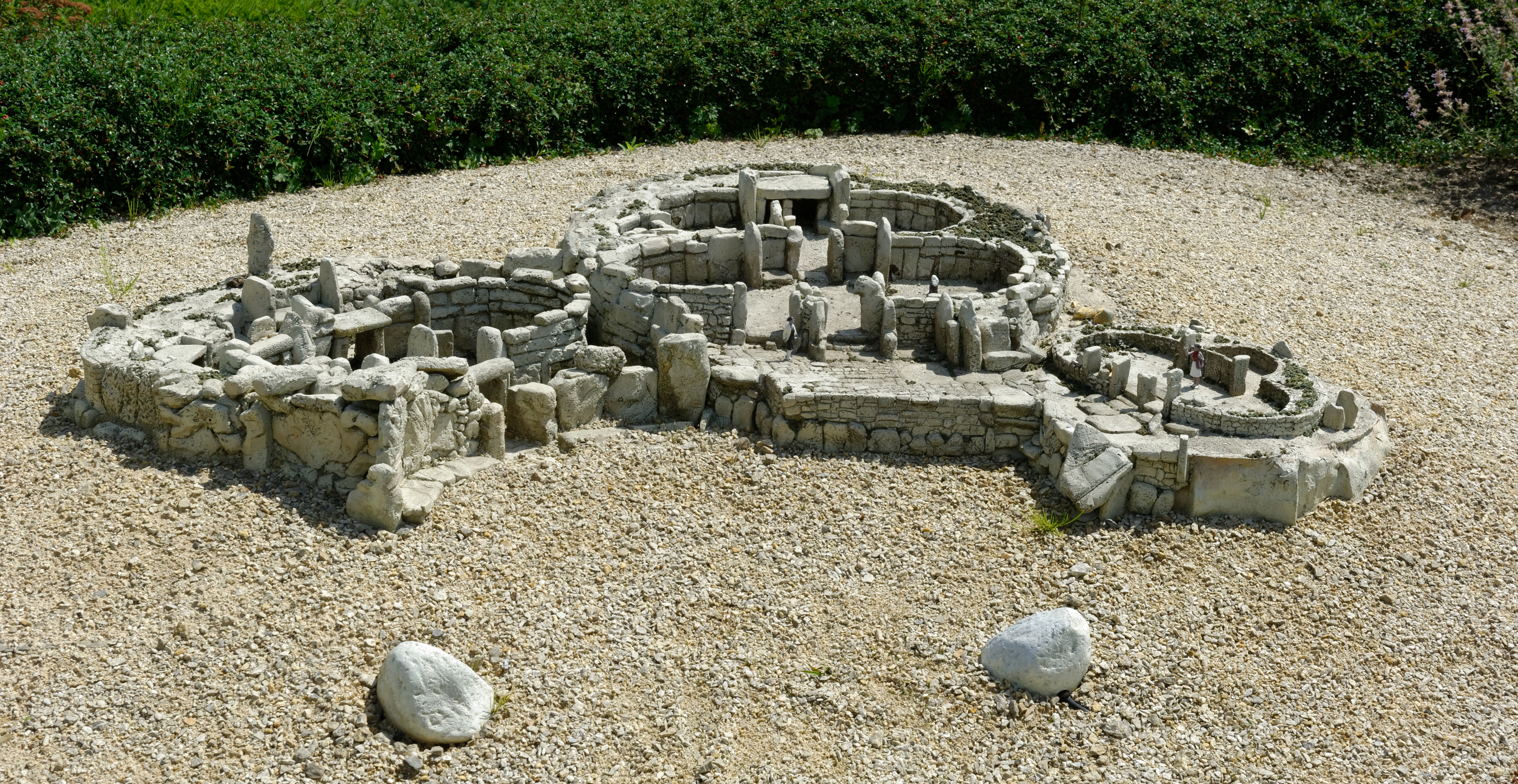
Mnajdra temple, Qrendi (Malta)

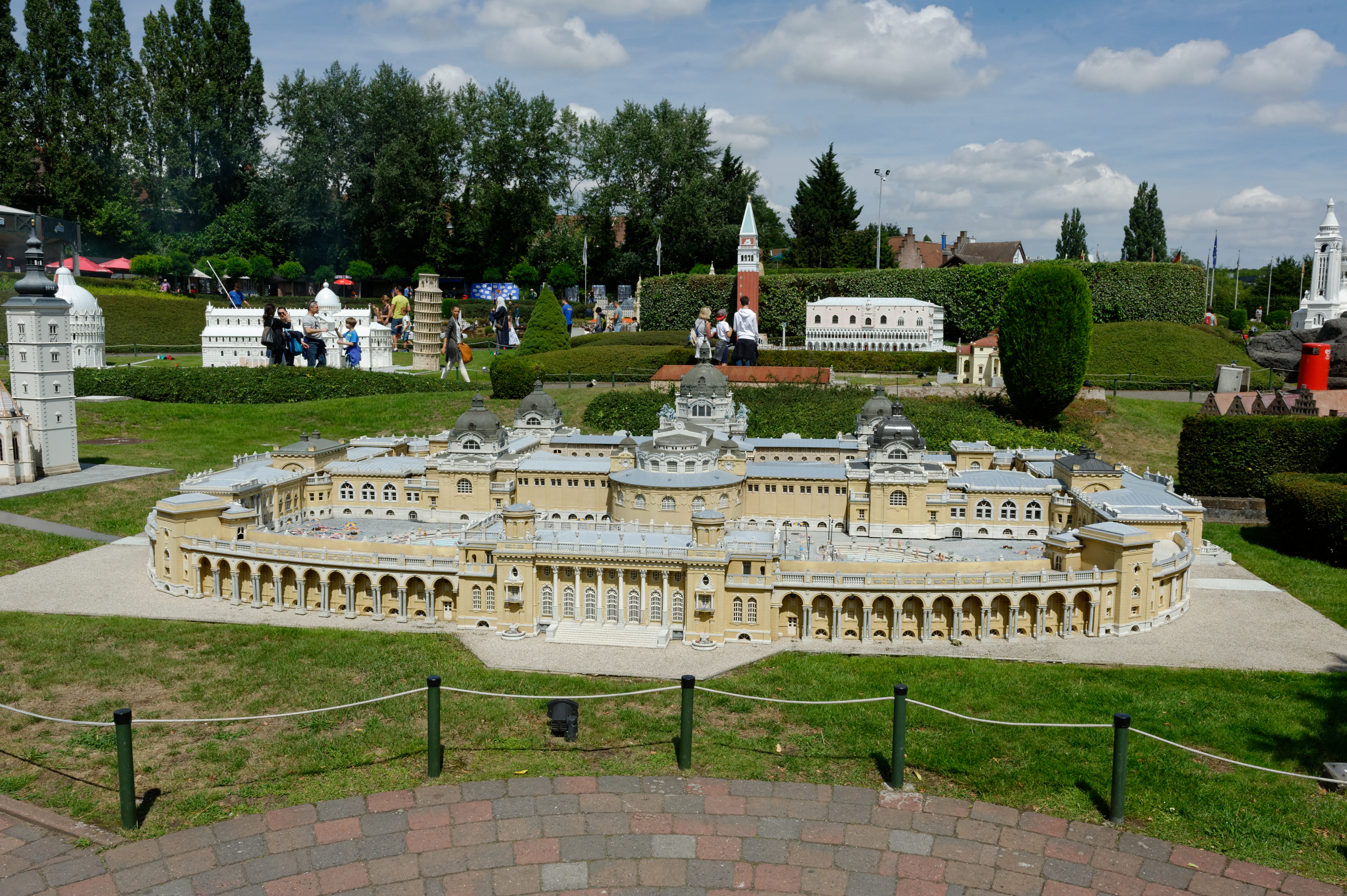
Széchenyi Bath, Budapest (Hungary)

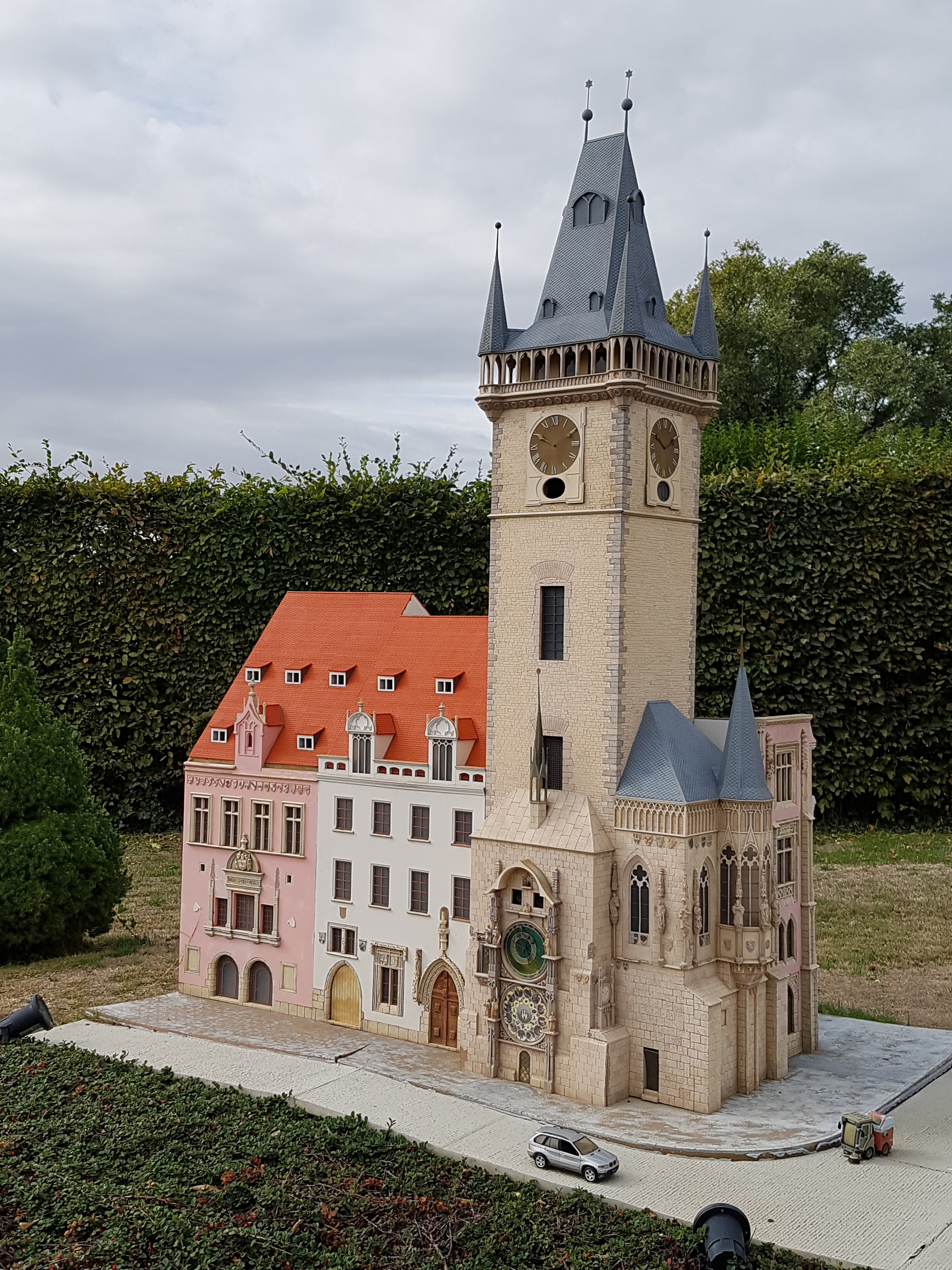
Old Town Hall, Prague (Czech Republic)

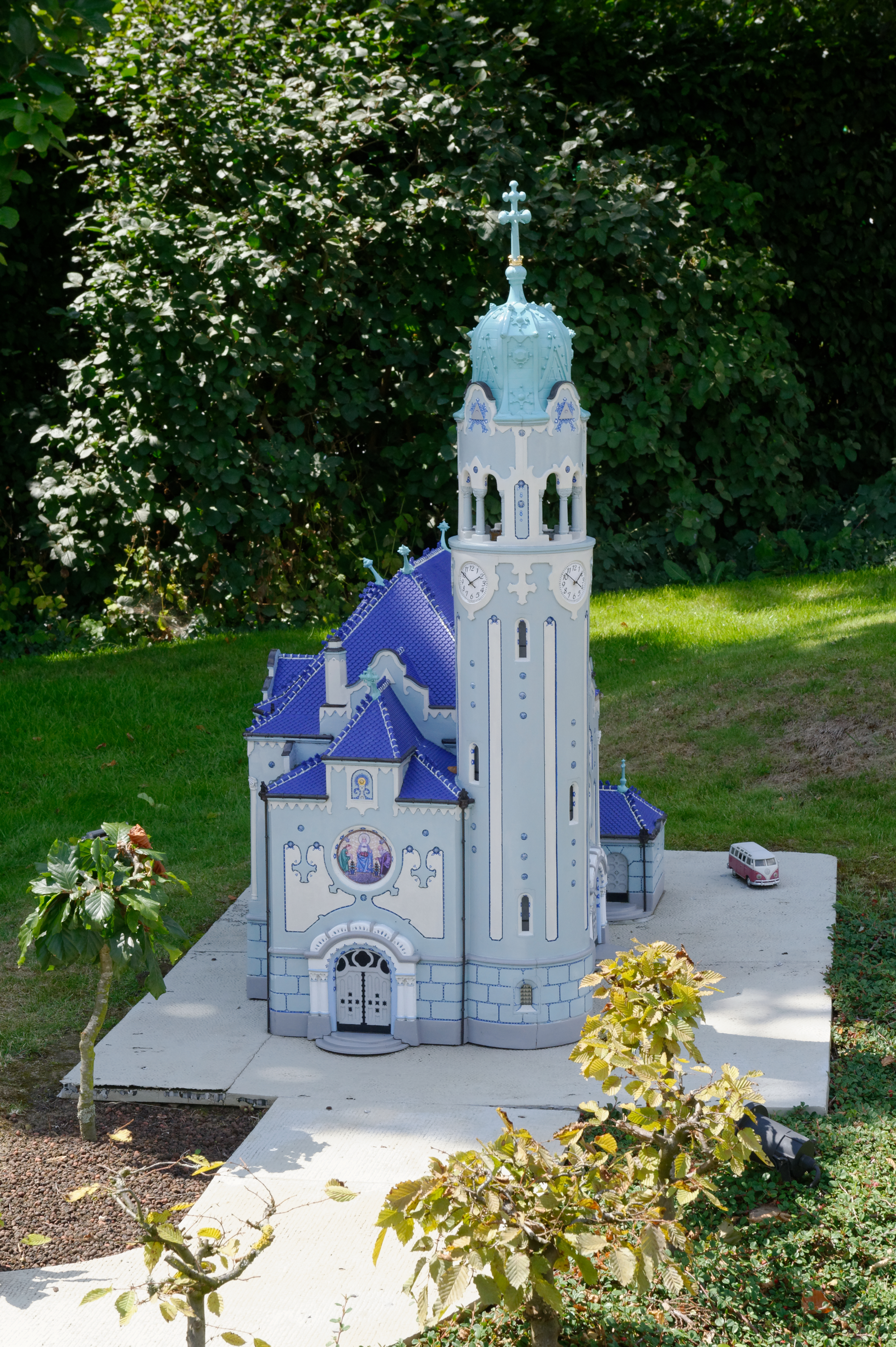
Blue Church, Bratislava (Slovakia)

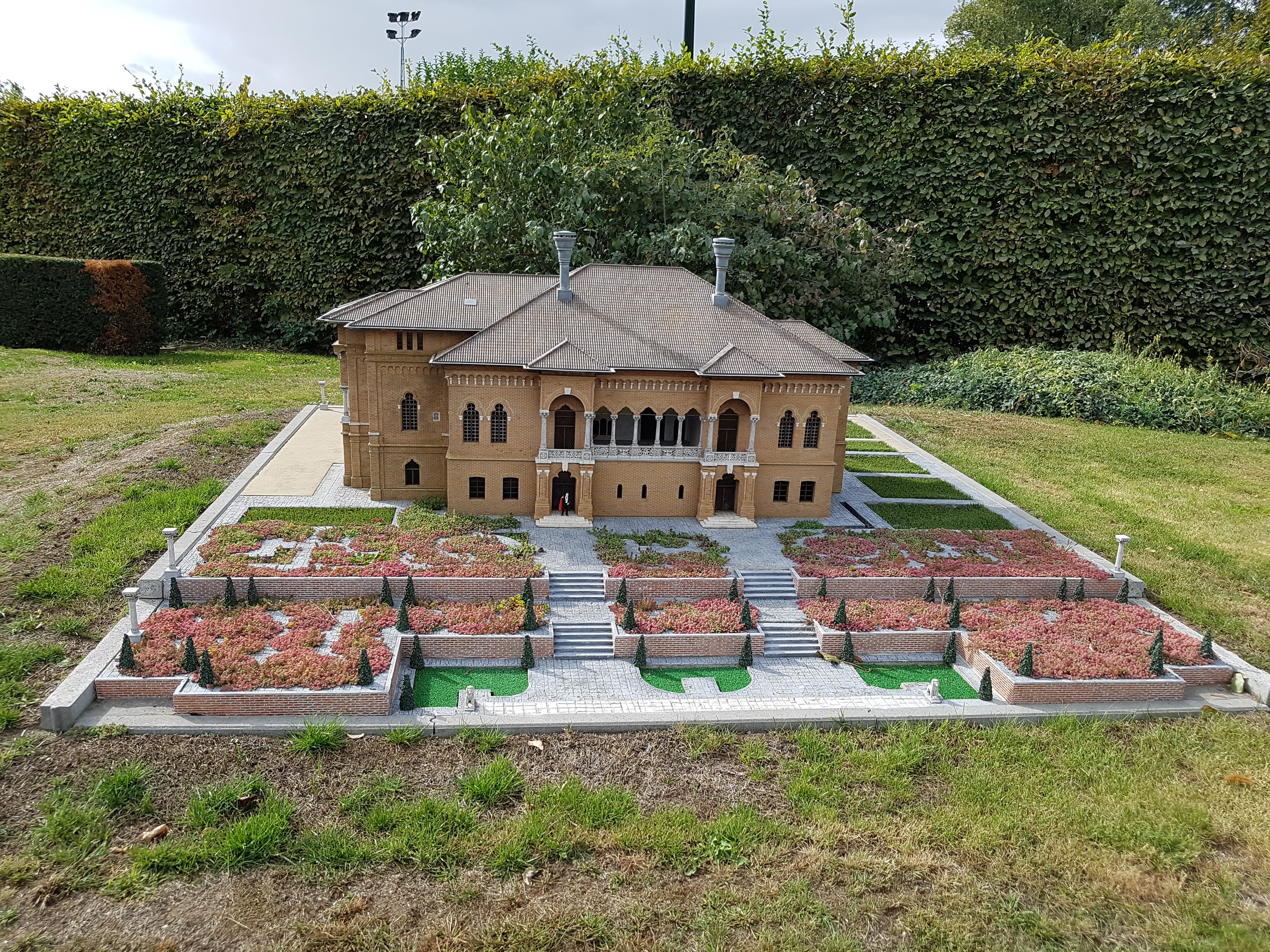
Mogoșoaia Palace, Mogoșoaia (Romania)

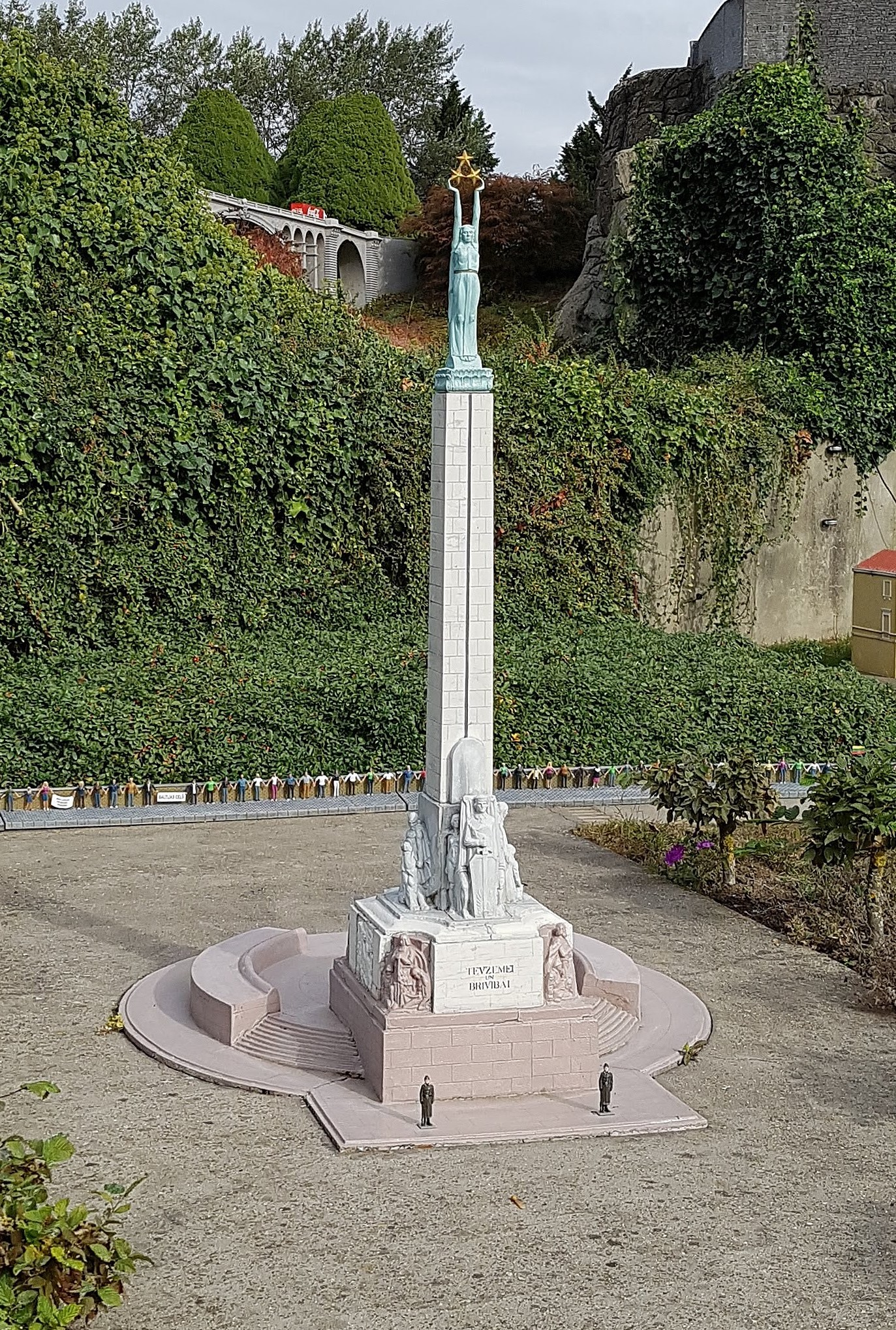
Freedom Monument, Riga (Latvia)

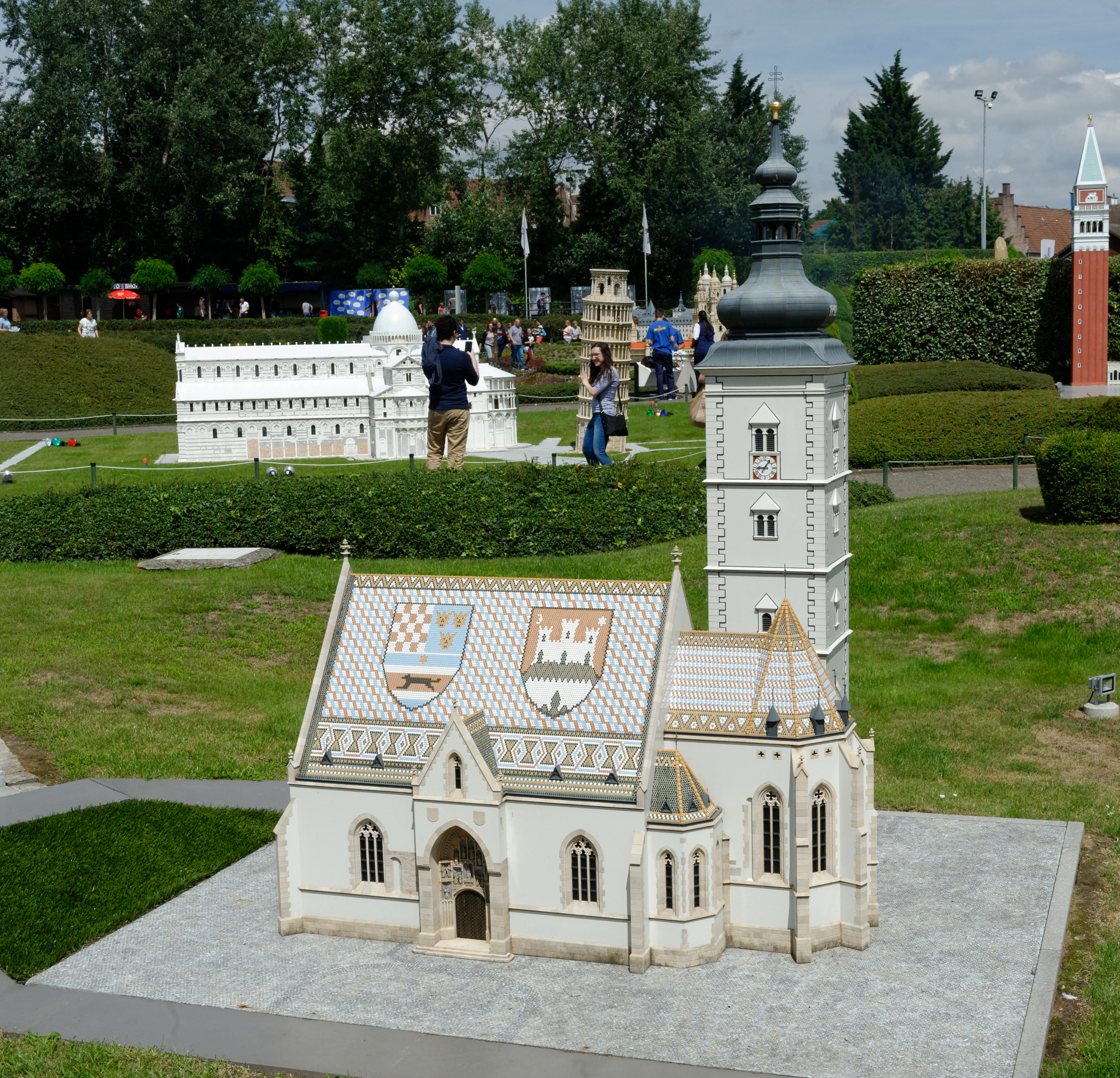
St. Mark's Church, Zagreb (Croatia)

== See also ==
- Madurodam — model village in the Netherlands containing miniature famous Dutch landmarks
- Catalunya en Miniatura — miniature park located 17 km (11 mi) away from Barcelona, with an exhibition area of 35,000 m^{2} (380,000 sq ft) including all major buildings of Catalonia and of Antoni Gaudí
- Italia in miniatura — miniature park near Rimini, Italy
- Bekonscot — typical English village in miniature
- Huis ten Bosch — Japanese theme park modelled on the cities and landscape of the Low Countries
- Minimundus — miniature park in Klagenfurt, Austria
