= Ablington, Gloucestershire =

Village in Gloucestershire, England

Coordinates: 51.767°N 1.851°W

Ablington
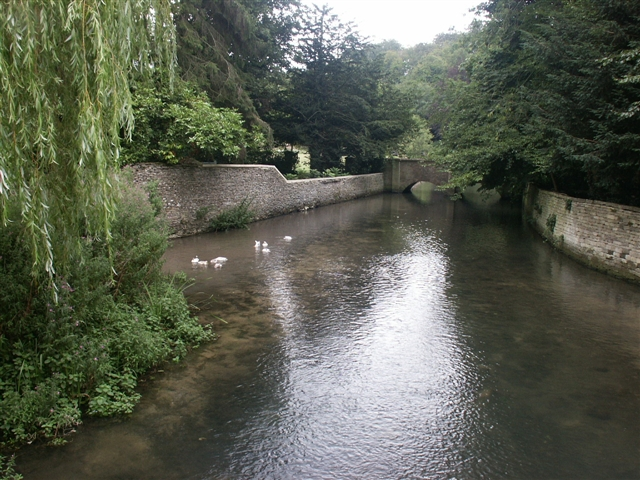
- The River Coln in Ablington

- Location within Gloucestershire
- OS grid reference: SP104076
- Civil parish: Bibury
- District: Cotswold
- Shire county: Gloucestershire
- Region: South West
- Country: England
- Sovereign state: United Kingdom
- Post town: Cirencester
- Postcode district: GL7

Ablington is a village in the county of Gloucestershire, England. It is located in the Coln Valley and is part of the Bibury civil parish, 6 miles (9.7 km) north-east of Cirencester. Ablington is in the Cotswolds which has been designated by Natural England as an Area of Outstanding Natural Beauty (AONB).

Ablington Manor, a late 16th century country house with later additions, is a Grade I listed building.

The name 'Ablington' is derived from the 'estate called after Eadbald' (personal name Ēadbald + ing + tūn) and is recorded as Eadbaldingtun in 855, as Ablinton between 1209-1509 and Ablyngton between 1286 and 1601.
