= Arlington Row =

Building in Bibury, England

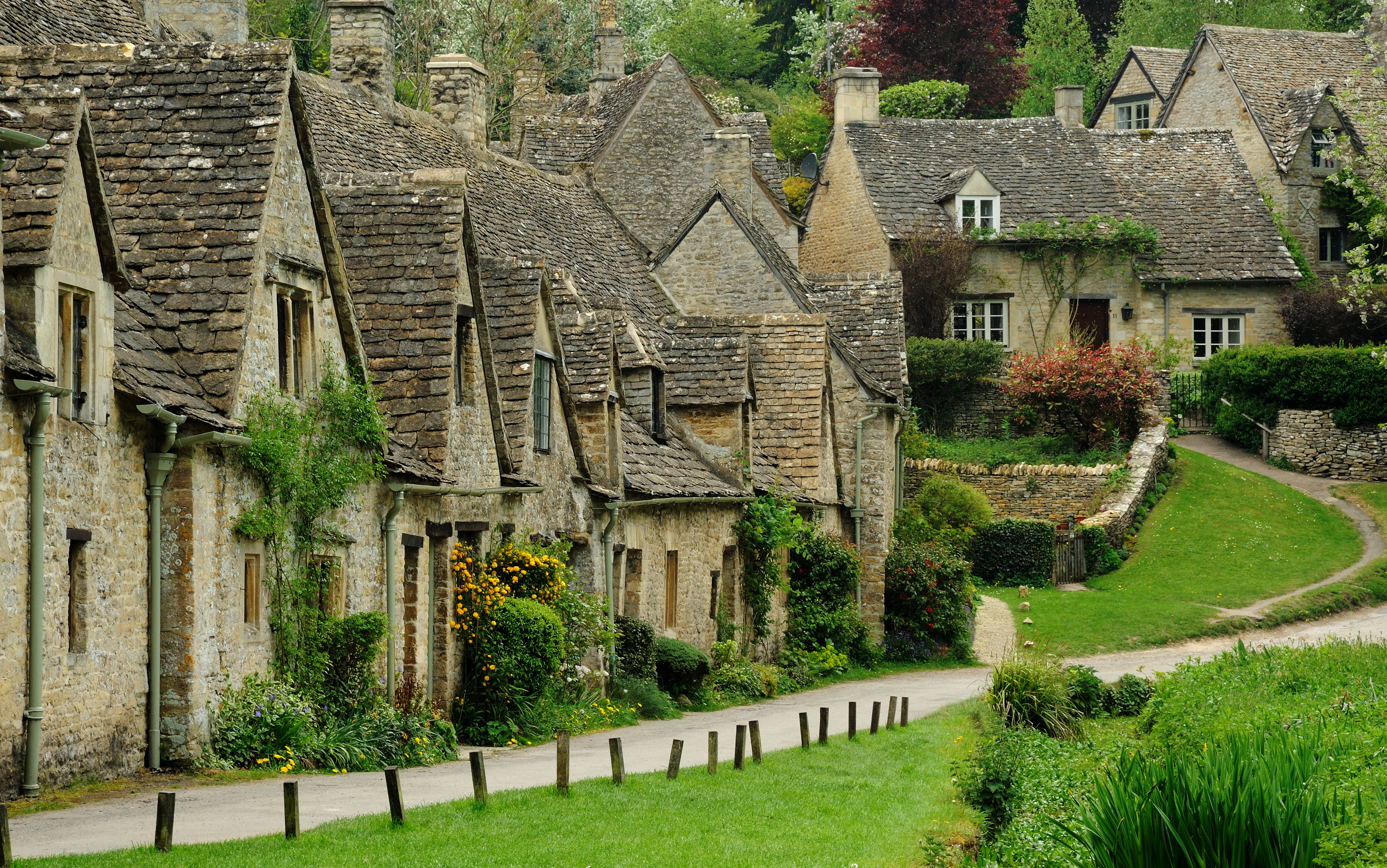

- Location within Gloucestershire
- 51.7584°N 1.8348°W
- Location: Arlington, Bibury, Gloucestershire, England

Listed Building – Grade I
- Official name: Arlington Row
- Designated: 23 January 1952
- Reference no.: 1155677

Arlington Row at Arlington in the parish of Bibury, Gloucestershire, England was built in the late 14th century as a wool store and converted into weavers' houses in the late 17th century. It is a Grade I listed building, owned by the National Trust.

Arlington Row on Awkward Hill is a nationally notable architectural conservation area depicted on the inside cover of all United Kingdom passports. It is a popular visitor attraction, reportedly one of the most photographed Cotswold scenes.

== History ==
The cottages were built in 1380 as a monastic wool store. This was converted into a row of cottages for weavers in the late 17th century, with some late 17th- or early 18th-century additions.

The cloth produced there was hung out on racks to dry on The Rack Isle opposite, before being sent on to Arlington Mill for degreasing.

It was preserved by the Royal Society of Arts in 1929 and restored by the National Trust in the 1970s.

It has been used as a film and television location, most notably for the films Stardust and Bridget Jones's Diary.

In 2017 the BBC reported that an "ugly" car parked by an elderly motorist had been vandalised, possibly by visitors who had repeatedly complained that it spoilt photographs.

== Architecture ==
The limestone two-storey buildings have gables below cruck roofs covered with slate.
