= Bibury =

Village in Gloucestershire, England

Coordinates: 51.7582°N 1.8324°W

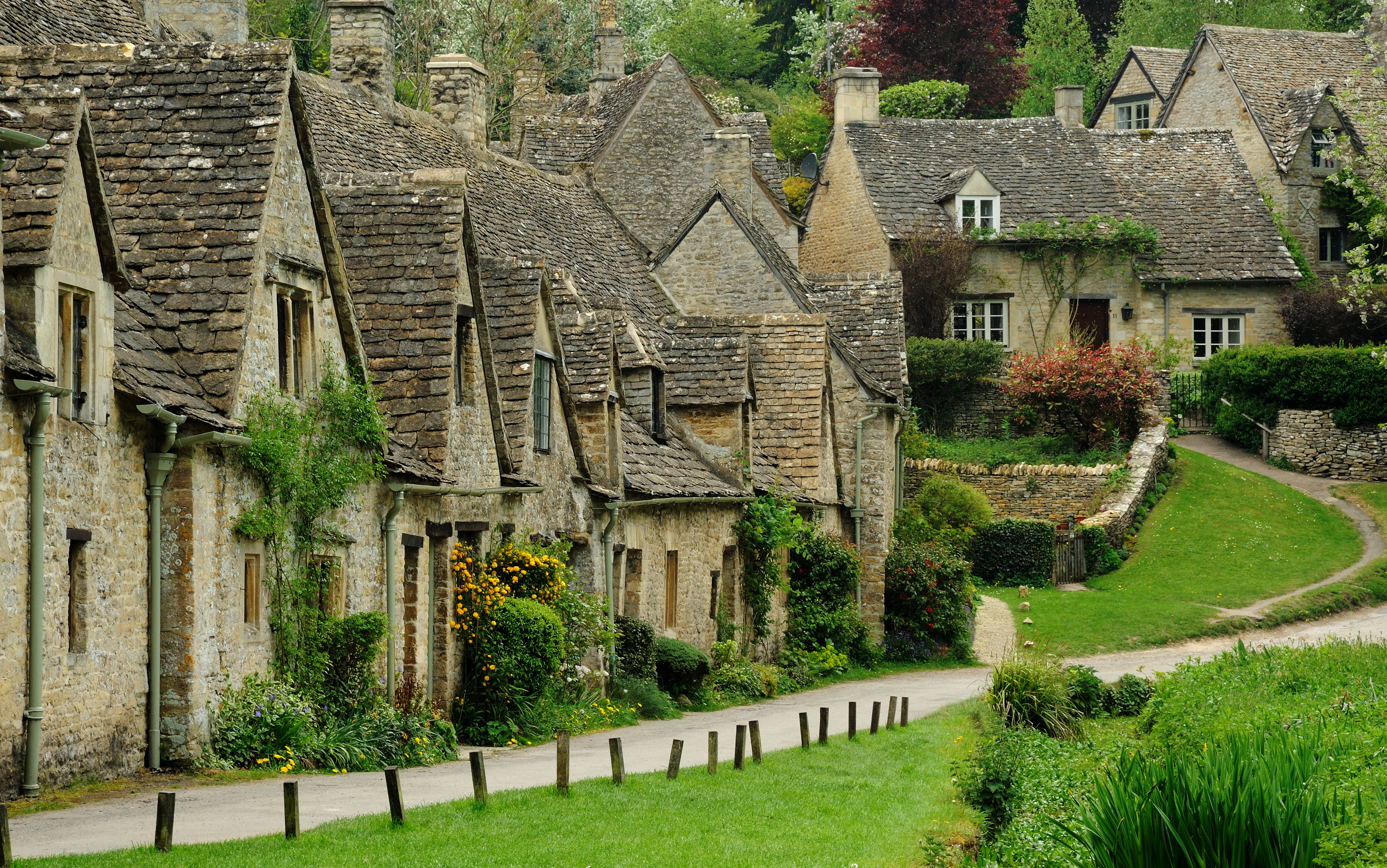
- Arlington Row: Cotswold stone cottages

- Location within Gloucestershire
- Population: 627 (2011)
- OS grid reference: SP115066
- Civil parish: Bibury
- District: Cotswold
- Shire county: Gloucestershire
- Region: South West
- Country: England
- Sovereign state: United Kingdom
- Post town: CIRENCESTER
- Postcode district: GL7
- Police: Gloucestershire
- Fire: Gloucestershire
- Ambulance: South Western
- UK Parliament: North Cotswolds
- Website: Bibury Parish Council

Bibury is a village and civil parish in Gloucestershire, England. It is on the River Coln, a Thames tributary that rises in the Cotswolds. The village centre is 6 miles (10 kilometres) northeast of Cirencester. Arlington Row is a nationally notable architectural conservation area depicted on the inside cover of some British passports. It is a major destination for tourists visiting the traditional rural villages, tea houses and many historic buildings of the Cotswold District; it is one of six places in the country featured in Mini-Europe, Brussels.

== History ==
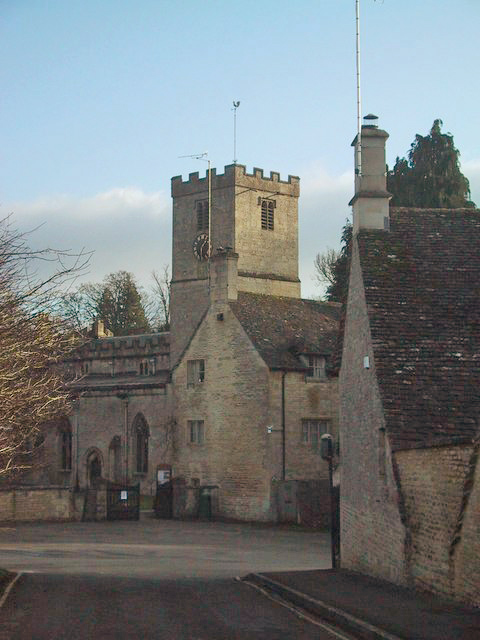
St Mary's Church, Bibury

In the Domesday Book (1086), a record of survey done under William the Conqueror, the place is named Becheberie, and it is recorded that the lands and church in Bibury were held by St Mary's Priory at Worcester, from whom it passed in 1130 to Osney Abbey, near Oxford: the Abbey continued to hold it until its dissolution in 1540.

The Church of England Church of St Mary is very late Anglo-Saxon with later additions and listed in the top of the three heritage/architecture categories, Grade I. Its main material is random (cobblestone) and coursed rubble limestone with a slate roof. It is formed of a nave with north and south aisles, south porch, north west tower and chancel, tower, arched doorways. The churchyard has been described as being "of special interest because of the remarkable survival of so many excellently carved table tombs with bale tops, and headstones with cherubs and symbolic figures of the seventeenth and eighteenth centuries". There is an early canonical sundial on the south wall. From AD 1130 until the English Reformation during the 16th century, the church was a peculier of Osney Abbey in Oxford.

Adjacent to the church is the village primary school that was built in the 1850s. In 2023 the school had 27 pupils in two classes. On the Arlington (west) side of the village is Arlington Baptist Church, where a congregation has been meeting since the 1740s.

Late in the 19th century George Witts recounted the discovery of the Bibury Roman villa: "In the year 1880 a Roman villa was accidentally discovered in the parish of Bibury, about 6 miles (10 kilometres) northeast of Cirencester. Some Roman pottery, coins, remnants of tesselated pavements, &c., were found, but as no examination has yet taken place, no description of the building can be given."—George Witts, 1883. The site fills a small low meander downstream of the bridge on the Arlington, Bibury side. Bibury village proper, on the east bank, consists of approximately 40 homes and businesses, of which two are prominent hotels.

== Visitor attractions ==
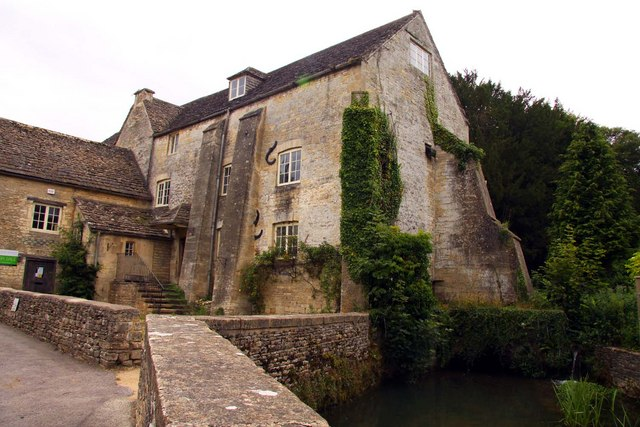
Arlington Mill in Bibury in 2009

The 19th-century artist and craftsman William Morris called Bibury "the most beautiful village in England" when he visited it.

The village is known for its honey-coloured 17th-century stone cottages with steeply pitched roofs, which once housed weavers who supplied cloth for fulling at nearby Arlington Mill. Until the 1980s, that building also housed the museum of Arlington Mill with a collection of period clothing, before it was shifted to Barnsley House. The Mill is now a private residence.

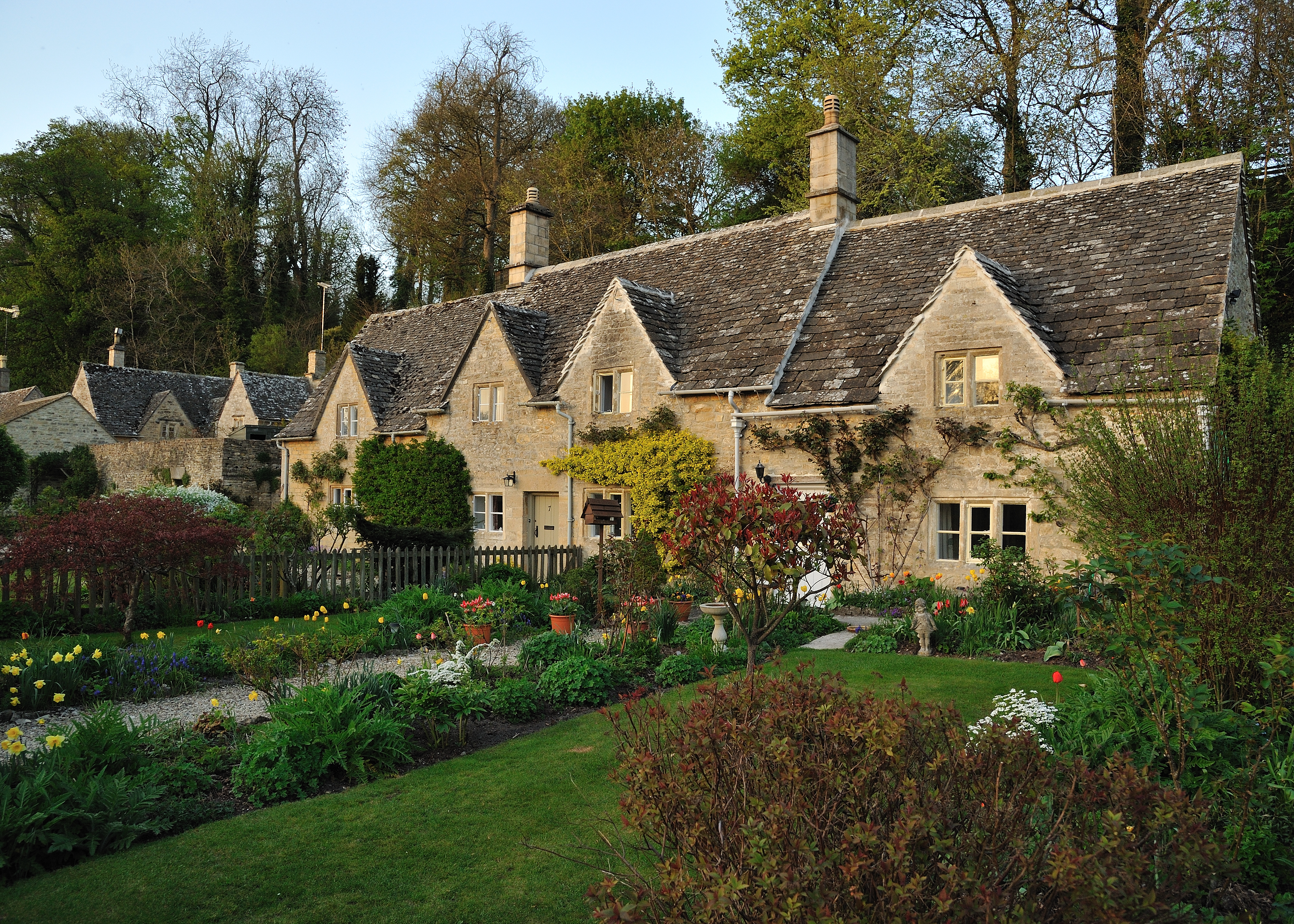
Bibury cottages

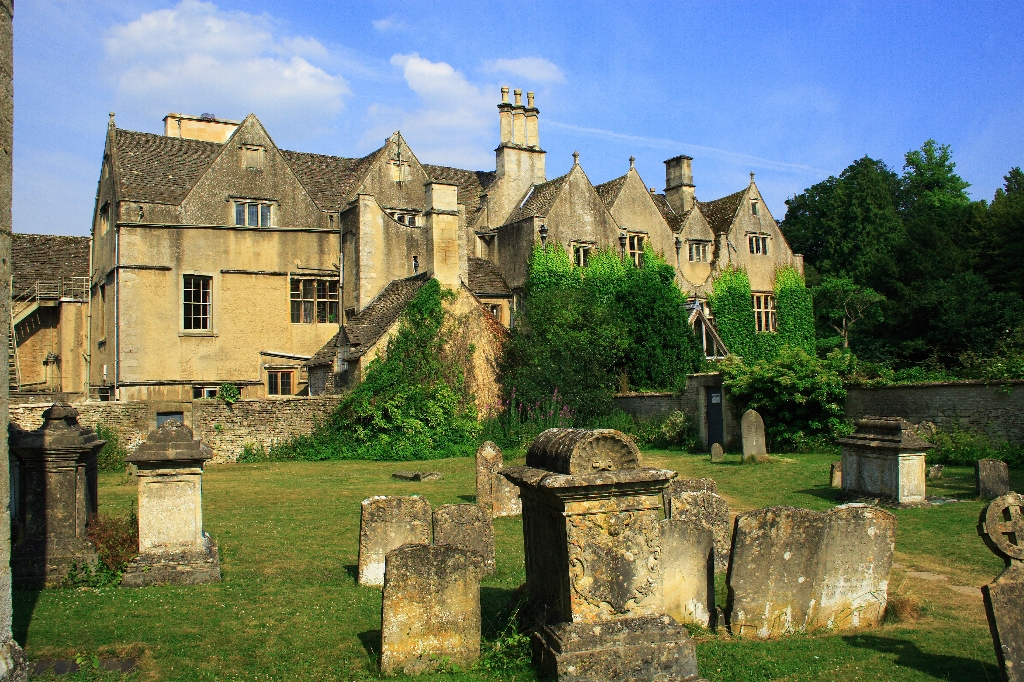
Bibury Court, built in 1633

The place where the wool was hung to dry after being washed in Arlington Row, was known as "Rack Isle". Today, this water meadow and marshy area, which is seasonally flooded and surrounded by water from three sides, is an important habitat for water-loving plants and birds including mallards, coots, and moorhens; it is also a National Trust Wildfowl Reserve.

Bibury is particularly frequented by Japanese tourists; this is largely attributed to emperor Hirohito having stayed in the village on his European tour.

The largest building in Bibury is Bibury Court, built in 1633 in the Jacobean style, and lived in by Lord Sherborne during the nineteenth century. It is now a Grade I listed building, and was a hotel from 1968 to 2014, when it closed. It was then purchased by the designer Marc Newson to be his family home.

=== Arlington Row ===
The picturesque Arlington Row cottages were built in 1380 as a monastic wool store. This was converted into a row of cottages for weavers in the 17th century. The cloth produced there was sent to Arlington Mill. Arlington Row is a popular visitor attraction, probably one of the most photographed Cotswold scenes, and was preserved by the Royal College of Arts. It has been used as a film and television location, most notably for the film Stardust. Claims that Bridget Jones's Diary was also filmed at Arlington Row seem incorrect. In 2017 the BBC reported that an "ugly" car parked by an elderly resident had been vandalised, possibly by visitors who had repeatedly complained that it spoilt photographs.

== Geography ==
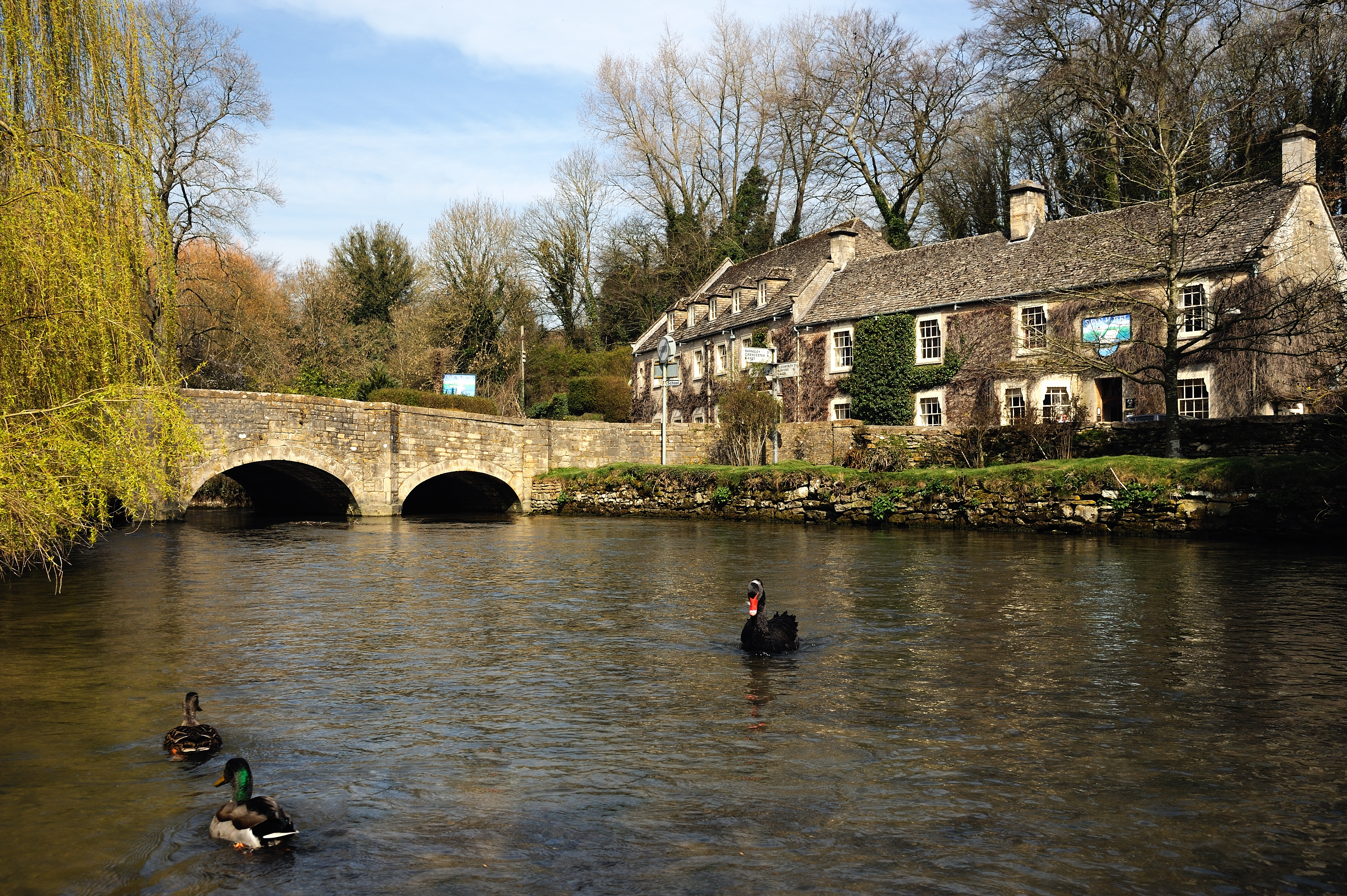
Grade II listed buildings in Bibury along the River Coln

The Coln, a tributary of the Thames, flows in a very steep valley (in Thames Basin terms) southeastwards. It flows alongside the midsection of Bibury with Arlington's main street which doglegs to achieve this. Each side has a similar concentration and scale of development; each bank's development falls mainly in the Bibury conservation area which has an insightful district surveyor's statement for building owners and visitors.

The parish is approximately rectangular and stretches far to the rolling, elevated, north. It includes on outlying settlement, Ablington, in the upper valley. Bibury Farm is 300 metres (330 yd) from the village, 151 metres (495 ft) above Ordnance Datum (AOD), which is a similar elevation to much of the north. The south rises to a maximum of 141 metres (463 ft) on its periphery along Akeman Street, a Roman road, before ascending further in other more distant lands. The valley floor within the Bibury boundary, northwest and southeast, ranges from 108 to 98 metres (354 to 322 ft) AOD.

The Coln, along with the Bibury Spring, supplies Bibury Trout farm, founded in 1902 by the naturalist Arthur Severn, to stock the local rivers and streams with the native brown trout. The hatchery spawns up to six million trout ova every year. Three medieval clusters are all interspersed by substantial grass, making for a dense developed area compared to suburbs but not in terms of roads; a footbridge connects both sides (Arlington and Bibury) as well as various footpaths in all directions. Elevations vary widely even throughout the village parts, with the gentlest slope in the eastern escarpment of the Cotswold Hills for 1 mile (1.5 kilometres) or more in each direction taken by the main village road.

== Culture ==
The world's first horse racing club, The Bibury Club, was formed in 1681 and held race meetings on Macaroni Downs above the village until the early 20th century.

== In popular media ==
Bibury is prominently featured as a character's hometown in the manga series Kin-iro Mosaic. The director of its animated adaptation, Motoki "Tensho" Tanaka, later founded Bibury Animation Studios.

== Notable inhabitants ==
In 2000, Daniel Brennan KC, barrister, was made Lord Brennan and Bibury is his territorial designation as his home village.

The merchant and writer Thomas Tryon was a native of Bibury.

== See also ==
- Grade I listed buildings in Gloucestershire
- List of Roman villas in Gloucestershire

== Bibliography ==
- Ray Lipscombe (photographs) (2011). Bibury Seasons. Memoirs Publishing. ISBN 978-0-9565102-1-1.
