= Belga =

Belga may refer to:

- Belga News Agency, Belgian news agency
- Belga (cigarette), Belgian brand
- Belga Films, Belgian film production and distribution company
- SS Belga, Swedish merchant ship
- Beau Belga (born 1986), Filipino basketball player
- Belga, mid-20th century Belgian gold currency worth five Belgian francs
