= Leo Marfurt =

SwissBelgian artist (1894–1977)

- Born: 1894; Aarau, Aargau, Switzerland
- Died: 1977 (aged 82–83); Antwerp, Belgium
- Education: Basel School of Arts and Crafts
- Known for: commercial art
- Style: Art Deco

Leo Marfurt (1894–1977) was a Swiss-Belgian commercial artist, known for his posters of the 1930s, in an innovative Art Deco style that sometimes incorporated elements of Futurism, Cubism and Surrealism.

== Life ==
Marfurt was born in Aarau, Switzerland, in 1894. He moved to Belgium in 1921, marrying there in 1922.

In 1927, Marfurt set up his own business in Brussels under the name Les Créations Publicitaires ("Advertising Creations"). His customers included the Brussels world fairs (the 1935 Brussels International Exposition and the 1958 Expo 58), Minerva automobiles, Chrysler automobiles, Belga cigarettes, cross-channel ferries, and railways in both Belgium and the United Kingdom.

He died in Antwerp in 1977.

== Exhibitions ==
An exhibition of Leo Marfurt's posters advertising gins and liqueurs was held in the Nationaal Jenevermuseum, Hasselt, from January to May 2002.
