= Belga (cigarette) =

Former Belgian cigarette brand

- An old Belgian pack of Belga cigarettes.
- Product type: Cigarette
- Current owner: British American Tobacco
- Country: Belgium
- Introduced: 1923; 103 years ago
- Discontinued: June 2014
- Markets: Belgium, Luxembourg, Netherlands, Spain

Belga was a Belgian brand of cigarettes that was owned and manufactured by British American Tobacco.

== History ==
The brand was launched in 1923 by the tobacco vendors Alphonse and François Vander Elst. After World War I ended, Alphonse and François Vander Elst wanted to launch a brand which the Belgians could be proud of. The new brand was named after the then currency Belga, exactly the price of a pack.

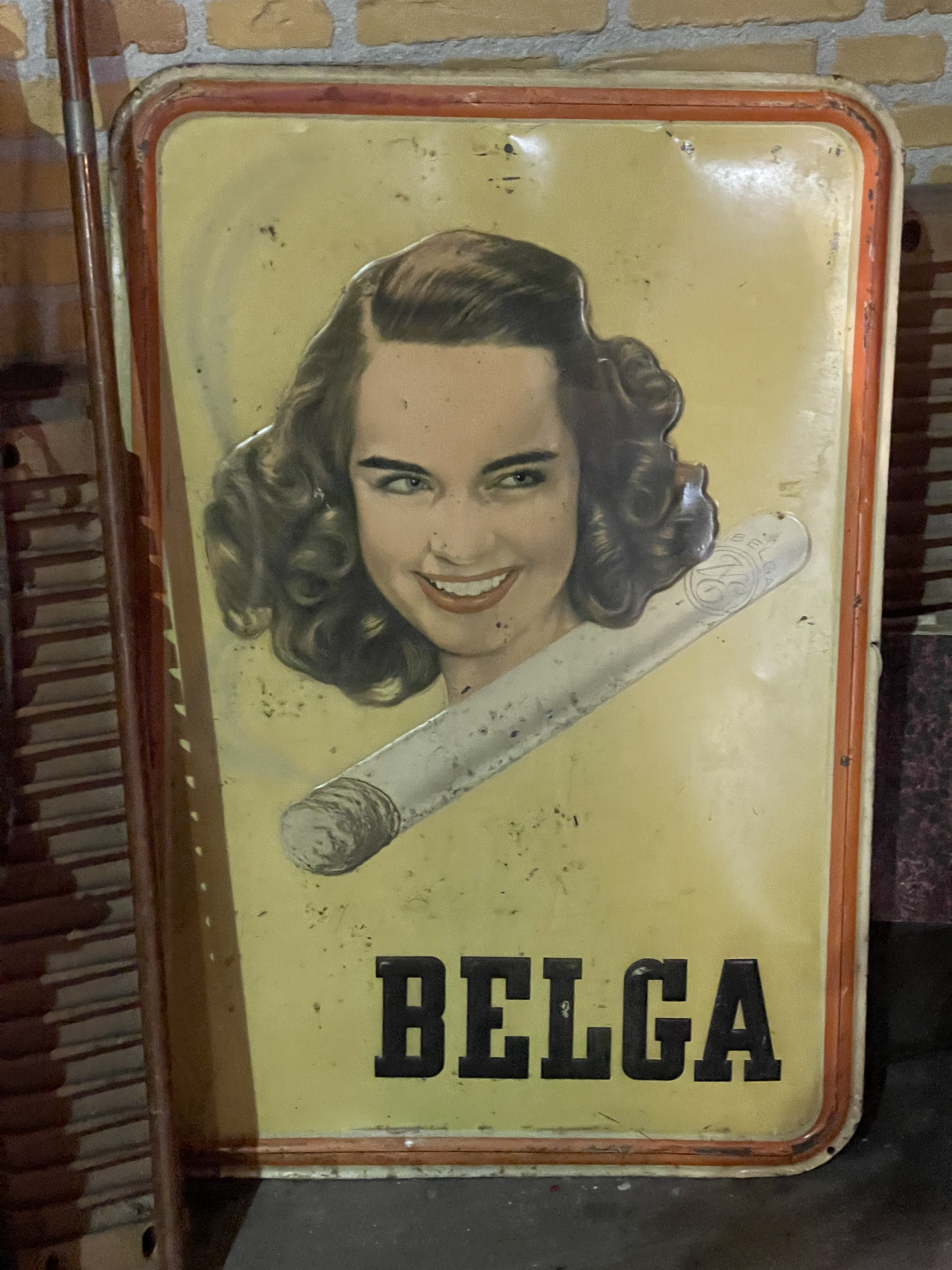
Old Belga advertising sign

In addition, the brand name was adorned in the Belgian tricolour in order to stir up patriotic feelings of the citizens. Soon Belga grew into the most popular brand of Belgium. In 1941, the brand was removed from the market for a few years after the German occupation of Belgium during World War II because of its patriotic character.

The brand was known for its iconic image, designed by Leo Marfurt, of a lady with a yellow scarf and black hat with a yellow feather standing against a red background. Paula Colfs-Bollaert, from Antwerp, was the model. Advertising posters invariably showed a smoking woman: the American illustrator Lawrence Sterne Stevens made a well-known poster depicting Netta Duchâteau as a flapper in 1930.

In 1990, the woman's head was removed from the packet, but later returned in a modified form in 2005.

In 2004, the cigarette factory Tabacofina-Vander Elst located in Merksem closed its doors and moved production to the Netherlands.

In June 2014, it was announced that the brand would be pulled off the shelves and replaced by Lucky Strike.

The company's main market was Belgium. Other markets were Luxembourg, the Netherlands and Spain.

== See also ==
- Tobacco smoking
