= František Kahuda =

Czech politician and educator

František Kahuda (January 3, 1911 – February 12, 1987) was a Czechoslovak physicist and educator. Between 1954 and 1963 he served as the Minister of Education, and from 1967 to 1985 he was one of the major promoters of psychotronics, within which he founded his own school, called psychoenergetics.

== Minister of Education and Culture ==
As Minister of Education and Culture during the 1950s he encouraged films with "ideological" content and limited the proportion of Western films screened. He left the post in the mid-1960s, being thought insufficiently "progressive", although he later publicly supported the Prague Spring.

== Scientific career ==
His scientific career began in 1952, when he successfully defended a dissertation thesis on photonics and thus obtained a doctorate in natural science. For a period he taught mathematics at Gymnázium třída Kapitána Jaroše in Brno. After a short period on the faculty of math and physics at the Charles University in Prague and at Chemical-technological University, he was a chairman of the Czechoslovak Unity of mathematicians and physicists.

He also studied new possibilities of pedagogy and aspects of learning in education and upbringing in general. During this work he achieved knowledge that he summed up in his work "Dynamics of sociological and pedagogical aspects in the education of youth." He stressed the role of nonverbal factors in the process of education and upbringing, which he considered to be so crucial that he began to focus on them in his scientific research. Later on, he developed theories about certain mental factors unknown within current natural science and claimed to be related to the so-called "mental energy." His next scientific work was oriented in this direction. He published his findings in the Journal of Czech Physicians. Later on, his research was directed towards a scientific assignment at Chemical-technological University: "Mental energy and its use in practice." While completing this task he formulated the hypothesis of the so-called "fundamental radiation of materials." The radiation was subjected to research in his psychoenergetic laboratory.

From 1970 to 1987 he worked as a director of the Psychoenergetic Laboratory at the Chemical-technological University – Faculty of chemical engineering in Prague. After his death, the Psychoenergetic Laboratory was led by V. Grešík. The laboratory closed at the beginning of the 90s. The work of Kahuda's laboratory was taken up by the Psychoenergetic Society, later renamed the Czech Psychoenergetic Society (ČEPES). Among scientists, Kahuda was renowned for his peculiar views, which he promoted in public educational institutes, e.g. his theory of "mentions" and "psychons" – small particles of thought process – as well as extrasensory (mentionic) communication.
