= Verregat =

Neighbourhood in Brussels, Belgium

- Neighbourhood
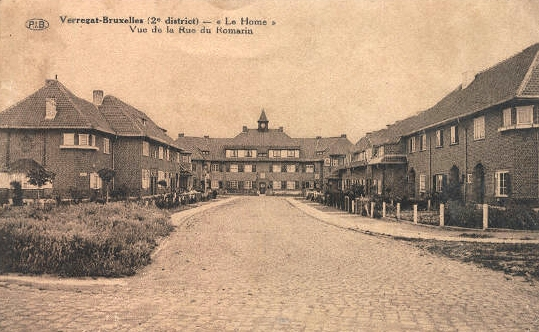
- Rue du Romarin/Rosmarijnstraat seen from Chaussée Romaine/Romeinsesteenweg c. 1935

- Location within Brussels Verregat (Belgium)
- Coordinates: 50°54′0.4828″N 4°19′51.6821″E
- Country: Belgium
- Region: Brussels-Capital Region
- Arrondissement: Brussels-Capital
- Municipality: City of Brussels
- Separated from Osseghem: 1618
- Construction start: 1924
- Time zone: UTC+1 (CET)
  - Summer (DST): UTC+2 (CEST)
- Postal code: 1020
- Area codes: 02

Verregat is a neighbourhood of Brussels, Belgium, located north of the Heysel/Heizel, east of the Cité Modèle, and bordering the Flemish Region to the north. The area was developed in phases between 1922 and 1926 by the architects Henri Derée and Jules Ghobert, in a style influenced by the Amsterdam School and with picturesque character, and then from 1951 to 1953 by the same Ghobert.

== History ==
Verregat originally formed part of Osseghem/Ossegem, named after the 4th-century Frankish family Osso. By the 12th century, the area had developed into a monastic estate under the ownership of Afflighem Abbey. In 1618, a separate farmstead was established at Verregat, comprising 70 bunder of land. The estate's importance grew notably during the reigns of Charles V and Philip II, the latter of whom chose Laeken as his residence. Following the abolition of monasteries in 1797, Verregat was publicly sold, passing through the hands of various owners over time.

In 1922, the Société Coopérative Le Home was founded by 120 prospective tenants, mainly clerks and workers from the Compagnie du gaz of Saint-Josse-ten-Noode. They were later joined by employees from the railway and postal services. That same year, it purchased about two hectares of farmland that once belonged to the Verregat farm, located south of the current junction of the Rue des Genévriers/Jeneverbomenstraat and the Rue du Verregat/Verregatstraat.

Between 1922 and 1926, Le Home developed a social garden city on the site, based on plans by the architect Henri Derée. Although the original project envisioned 450 homes, only 177 houses and 14 apartments were completed. The last remains of the original Verregat farm were demolished in 1929. The site also replaced the former Verregat hippodrome, designed in 1908 along the Chaussée Romaine/Romeinsesteenweg.

Construction of the garden city formally began in 1924, focusing on 150 social houses mainly intended for employees of the post and railway services. The architect Raymond Moenaert initially drafted the urban development plan, later revised by Henri Derée. Derée designed nearly all houses in the first phase, except for sixteen dwellings (numbers 10 to 40 Rue des Genévriers) created by Jules Ghobert for a group of small private owners. While the initial blueprint proposed 450 houses, only 177 were realised, comprising five distinct architectural types. A block of fourteen flats, intended for childless households, was built at the highest point of the site.

In 1925, a part of the Verregat area was purchased by the City of Brussels. This section later became the location of the Palace 3, constructed for the Brussels International Exposition of 1935.

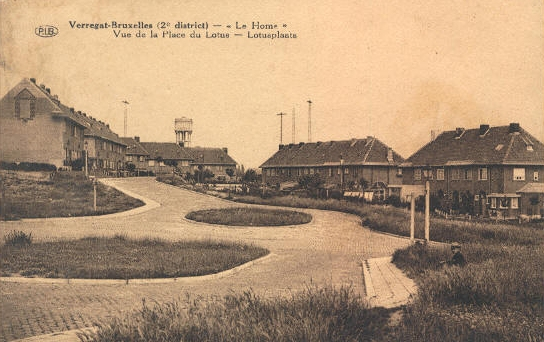
Place du Lotus/Lotusplein c. 1935

The neighbourhood's street names, derived from plants, herbs, shrubs, and bushes, were officially assigned by the Brussels City Council on 24 April 1925, except for the Chemin du Pourpier/Posteleinweg (named on 3 May 1927) and the Place du Lotus/Lotusplein, which, although named from the outset, was only officially confirmed on 26 April 1935. Over the years, around two-thirds of the houses were sold to cooperative members. Initially, Le Home reserved plots along the Avenue des Magnolias and the Chaussée Romaine for private development. In 1939, Ghobert drafted a plan for seventeen villas along the avenue between the Rue des Pivoines/Pioenenstraat and the Rue des Genévriers, though the project was never executed.

Thanks to the proceeds from house sales to cooperative members, a second construction phase became possible between 1951 and 1953. In this phase, Ghobert designed 144 additional apartments. These were constructed at various locations including the Avenue des Magnolias (numbers 14 to 30 and 55 to 59), the Chaussée Romaine (621 to 639), the Rue du Verregat (22), the Place du Lotus (1 and 3), and the Rue des Pivoines (1). These three-storey blocks featured pitched roofs, brick façades framed with yellow ceramics, and red ceramic latticework.

The neighbourhood underwent renovation in the 1980s, with further works carried out in 1990.

Verregat Park was officially inaugurated in December 2022. Its expansion and redevelopment were part of the NEO project, which aims to revitalise the Heysel and improve accessibility while offering new green space to local residents and visitors.

== Description ==
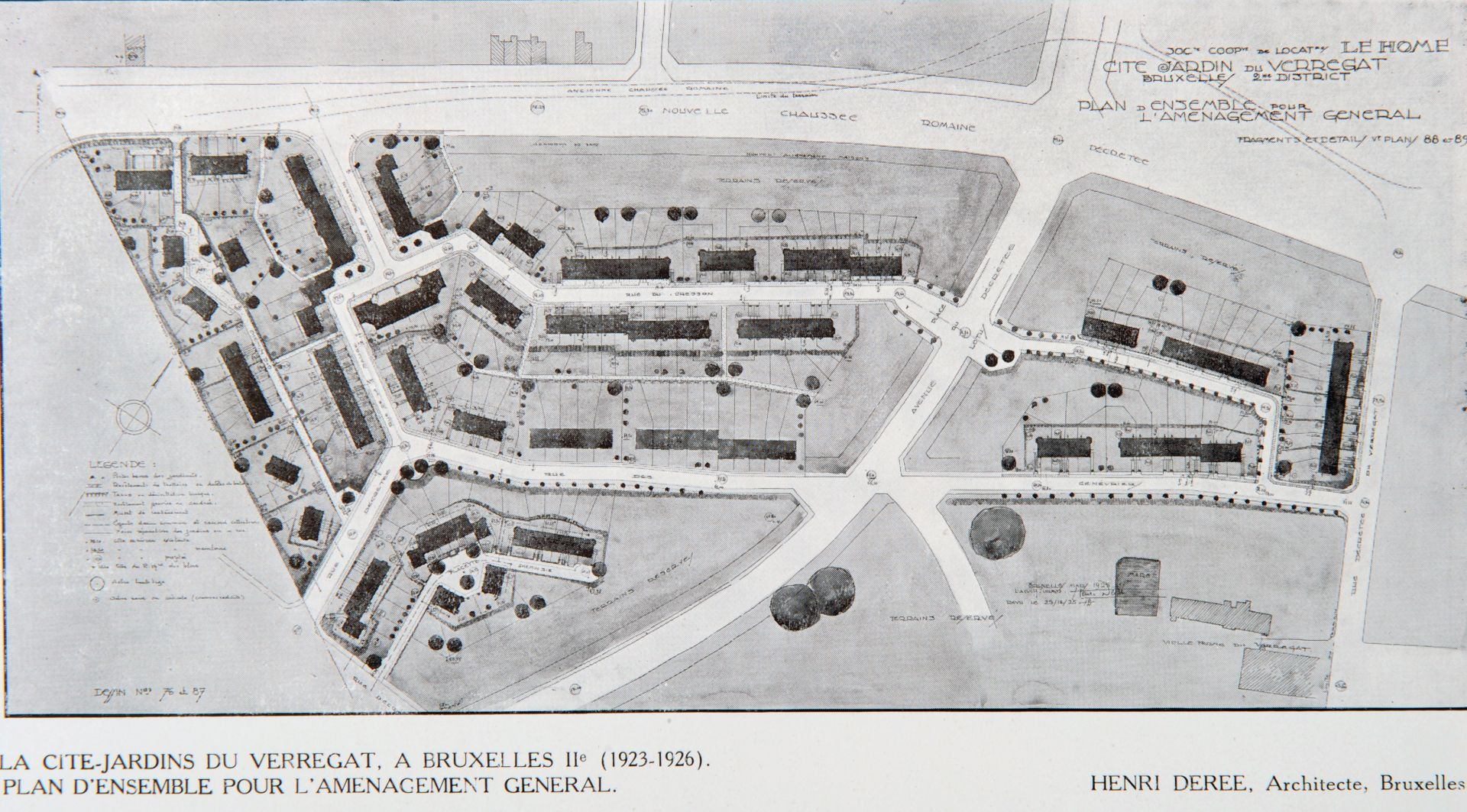
Verregat general construction plan.

Verregat is arranged on sloping terrain with curved streets and variously shaped squares, such as triangular and semi-circular plazas, creating diverse visual perspectives. Houses are staggered with front gardens and mainly accessed from the Chaussée Romaine via the Rue du Romarin/Rosmarijnstraat, where a prominent apartment building stands.

Early houses feature brick façades with blue stone details, originally surrounded by hedged front gardens. There are five main house types, mostly two-storey with gabled or hipped roofs, arranged in mirrored pairs with varied window and brick decoration. Derée's houses typically include a basement, ground floor with living spaces, first floor with bedrooms, and attic.

The apartment building at Rue du Cresson/Waterkersstraat 1–5 consists of two storeys under a hipped roof with a U-shaped plan around a courtyard, containing fourteen apartments. Over the years, houses have seen additions such as verandas, dormers, and garages, with many façades painted or plastered and much original woodwork replaced.

Building types:

- Type A: Paired entrance bays with narrow windows under a curved brick cornice; small upper windows; corner houses with triangular projections and sawtooth brick friezes.
- Type B: Single-storey façades in two groups, with paired entrances topped by trapezoidal dormers and additional brick dormers in the roof.
- Type C: Doors with transoms and hexagonal oculi above; angled corners with projections and side entrances on end houses.
- Type D: Doors with slanted reveals and chamfered arches; upper-floor corners with grouped windows and decorative brickwork; some side façades have trapezoidal projections with sawtooth friezes.
- Ghobert Houses: Doors flanked by pilasters, octagonal oculi, broad upper windows with parapets, and small wooden dormers; first houses in rows have risalit bays with hexagonal oculi.

== See also ==
- Neighbourhoods in Brussels
- History of Brussels
