= Brussels Planetarium =

Planetarium in Brussels, Belgium

Planetarium of the Royal Observatory of Belgium
- Planetarium van de Koninklijke Sterrenwacht van België (Dutch); Planétarium de l'Observatoire royal de Belgique (French); Planetarium der Königlichen Sternwarte von Belgien (German)
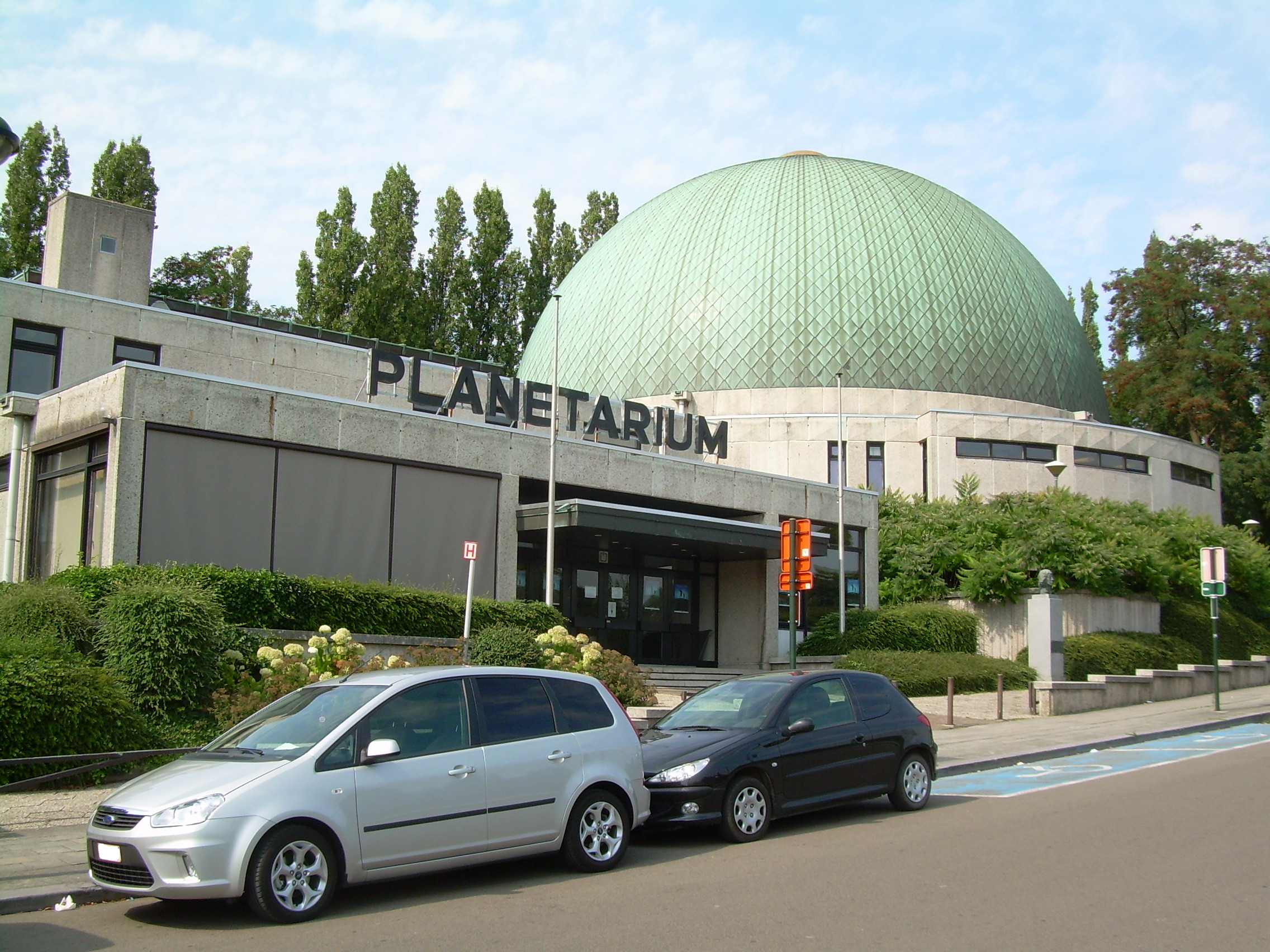
- Front of the Brussels Planetarium
- Former names: Alberteum Aedes Scientiae
- Alternative names: Brussels Planetarium

General information
- Type: Planetarium
- Location: Avenue de Bouchout / Boechoutlaan 10, 1020 Laeken, City of Brussels, Brussels-Capital Region, Belgium
- Coordinates: 50°53′36″N 4°20′15″E

Other information
- Public transit: 6 Heysel/Heizel and Houba-Brugmann

Website
- planetarium.be/en

The Planetarium of the Royal Observatory of Belgium (Dutch: Planetarium van de Koninklijke Sterrenwacht van België; French: Planétarium de l'Observatoire royal de Belgique; German: Planetarium der Königlichen Sternwarte von Belgien), commonly known as the Brussels Planetarium (Dutch: Planetarium van Brussel; French: Planétarium de Bruxelles; German: Planetarium von Brüssel), is the country's primary planetarium.

The planetarium was first established during the Brussels International Exposition of 1935 as the Alberteum Aedes Scientiae under the patronage of King Albert I; it closed in 1966. In the 1970s, the current building was constructed in its place. In 1979, the institution was integrated into the Royal Observatory of Belgium and it is now part of the Belgian Federal Science Policy Office (BELSPO).

The building is located on the Heysel/Heizel Plateau in Laeken (northern part of the City of Brussels), on the border of the Bruparck entertainment park (with the Atomium, Mini-Europe miniature park and Kinepolis cinema).

== History ==
=== Alberteum Aedes Scientiae ===
For the Brussels International Exposition of 1935, a Palace of Science, called Alberteum Aedes Scientiae ("Albert Science Building"), was constructed between the Avenue de Marathon/Marathonlaan and the Avenue du Football/Voetballaan, under the patronage of King Albert I. Designed by the architects Adrien and Yvan Blomme, the complex included exhibition halls, an auditorium, and a planetarium. The latter, created by Charles Van Nueten and Maurice Keym, was a circular structure topped with a copper-clad concrete dome. Its projection hall seated 500 visitors beneath a dome 23 metres (75 ft) in diameter, making it one of the largest planetaria in Europe at the time. The facility was equipped with an optical-mechanical projector built by Carl Zeiss of Jena, Germany, powered by 17 motors and incorporating 119 moving projectors that displayed the movements of celestial bodies on the dome.

=== Planetarium ===
Although the original planetarium was meant to survive beyond the 1935 exposition, its activities were interrupted during the Second World War. Partially reopened for the 1958 Brussels World's Fair (Expo 58), it closed permanently in 1966. Two years later, the City of Brussels leased the site to the State with the aim of building a new scientific centre, leading to the demolition of the Alberteum Aedes Scientiae around 1970. A replacement was built between 1971 and 1973, based on designs from 1969, and inaugurated on 28 September 1976. The new planetarium featured a dome measuring 23.55 metres (77.3 ft) in diameter, ensuring it ranked among the largest in Europe. At its centre was the Zeiss UPP 23/5 projector, containing 119 projectors capable of simulating the Sun, the Moon, the planets, the Milky Way, and more than 8,500 stars. In 1979, the planetarium was integrated into the Royal Observatory of Belgium.

Technological improvements continued into the 21st century. In 2009, a digital projection system was installed to complement the Zeiss projector. In April 2021, the dome was fully renovated and fitted with eight state-of-the-art Barco projectors installed by RSA Cosmos, accompanied by the SkyExplorer 2021 astronomical software.

== Architecture ==
=== Exterior ===
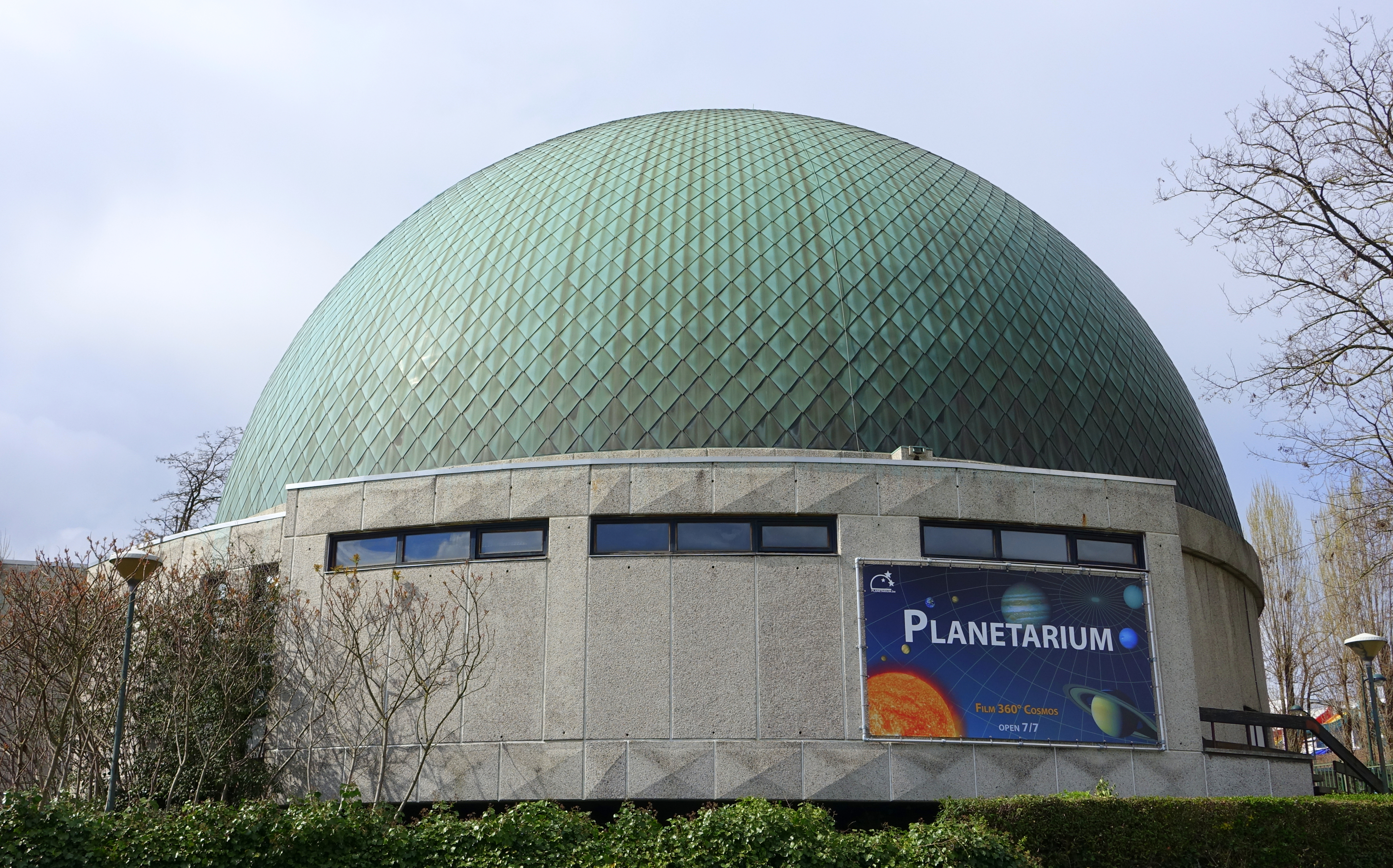
Exterior view of the dome

The planetarium is a concrete complex of three volumes. Two rectangular blocks with flat roofs form a cross-shaped plan: the first is single-storey and perpendicular to the street, while the second has two storeys topped with a copper-clad hipped roof. At the corner with the Avenue du Football, a circular volume with a copper dome houses the projection hall, partly surrounded by an annexe. Access is provided by exterior staircases leading to a terrace with parapet and wooden-railed balustrades.

The façades are clad in exposed aggregate concrete with diamond-shaped relief, broad window openings, and original wooden joinery. A recessed entrance under a canopy marks the street side, with PLANETARIUM in cut-out letters above. The site is enclosed by decorative concrete walls and hexagonal paving. In front stands Kopernik, a bronze bust of Nicolaus Copernicus by L. Kraskowska Nitschowa, commemorating the 500th anniversary of the astronomer's birth.

=== Interior ===
The entrance hall is paved with stone tiles and leads to a broad artificial stone staircase with metal railings and a wooden handrail. From the landing, curved staircases give access to the projection hall, while L-shaped stairs lead to a conference room. This room, set in a cantilevered extension, retains wooden panelling, a slatted ceiling with integrated lighting, and original seating with foldable writing tablets.

The circular projection hall has 351 seats arranged in arcs, designed to optimise visibility and acoustics beneath the dome.

== See also ==
- Belgian Institute for Space Aeronomy
- Royal Meteorological Institute
- Observatory
- Astrarium
- Astrolabe
- Astronomical clock
- Fulldome video
- Star atlas
