= Design Museum Brussels =

Museum in Brussels, Belgium

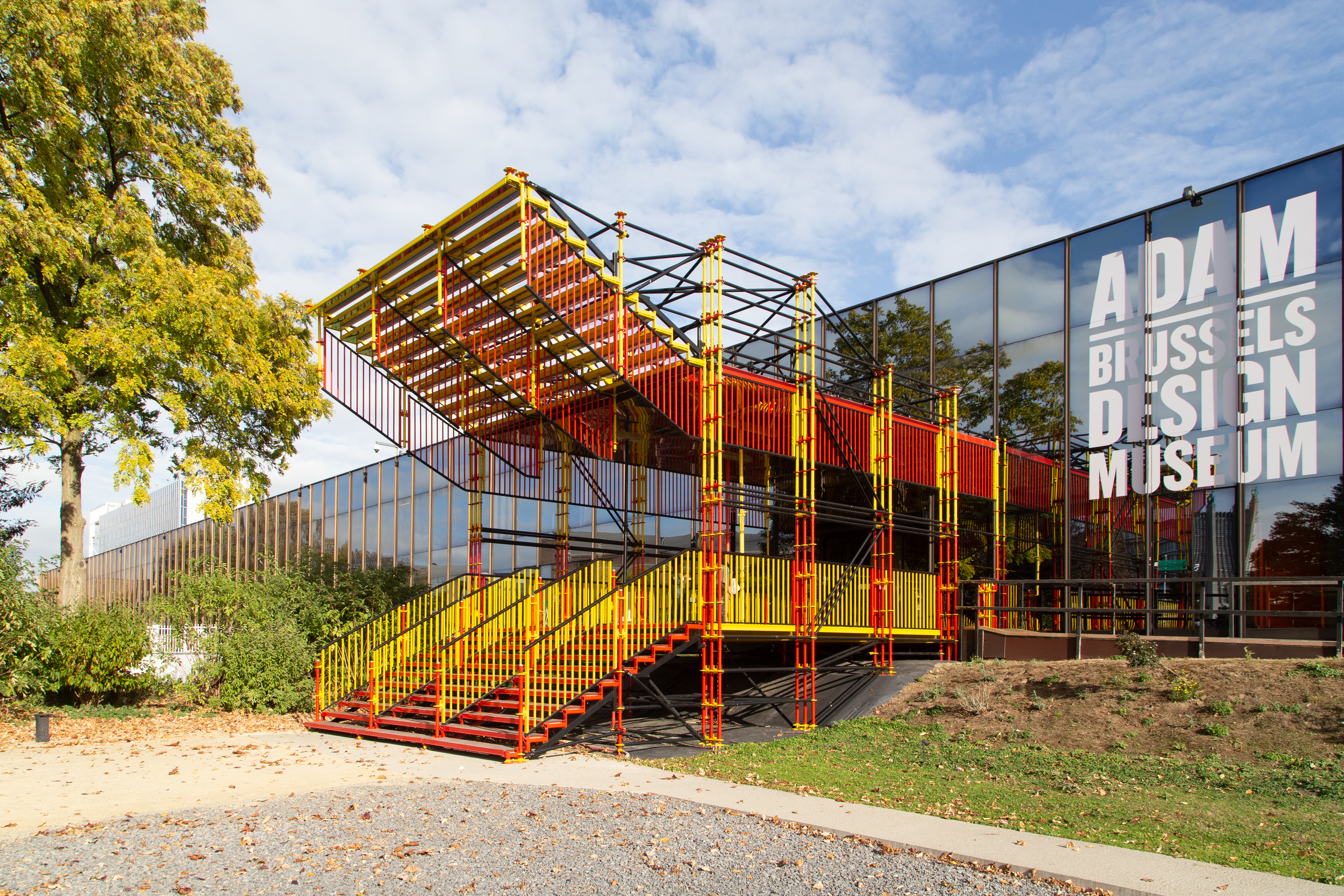
- The Design Museum Brussels in the Heysel/Heizel Park
- Interactive fullscreen map
- Former name: Art & Design Atomium Museum (ADAM)
- Established: 11 December 2015; 10 years ago
- Location: Place de Belgique / Belgiëplein, 1020 Laeken, City of Brussels, Brussels-Capital Region, Belgium
- Coordinates: 50°53′51″N 4°20′31″E
- Type: Design museum
- Founder: Philippe Decelle
- Owner: Atomium
- Public transit access: 6 Heysel/Heizel
- Website: designmuseum.brussels/en

Design Museum Brussels is a museum located in the Heysel/Heizel Park in Brussels, Belgium, close to the Atomium. The space focuses on design works from the 20th and 21st centuries. It was formerly called the Art and Design Atomium Museum (ADAM) until 2020. The size of the museum is 5,000 m^{2} (54,000 sq ft) and it received about 126,000 visitors in 2019. Arnaud Bozzini is the museum's director.

== History ==
The origins of the Design Museum Brussels trace back to 1987, when the collector Philippe Decelle discovered a discarded Joe Colombo chair, sparking his interest in plastic design. Over the following decades, Decelle assembled an extensive private collection of plastic objects, artworks, and furniture dating from the 1960s to the early 2000s. This collection, known as the Plasticarium, featured over 1,100 pieces by notable designers such as Verner Panton, Eero Aarnio, and Joe Colombo. It was initially displayed across three floors of Decelle's private residence on the Rue Locquenghien/Locquenghienstraat in central Brussels.

In December 2015, the Atomium acquired the Plasticarium and opened a new museum space in Trademart Brussels, adjacent to the Atomium, under the name Art & Design Atomium Museum (ADAM). The museum covered 5,000 m^{2} (54,000 sq ft), with approximately half of the space dedicated to the permanent collection and the remainder allocated to temporary exhibitions. On 2 October 2020, the museum was renamed Design Museum Brussels to reflect its evolving mission towards contemporary design. On the same day, it opened Belgisch Design Belge, a new permanent exhibition space dedicated to the history and practice of Belgian design. That year, the Plasticarium was also rebranded as the Plastic Design Collection.

== Collection ==
The collection includes works by Anna Castelli-Ferrieri, Apple Design Team (Jonathan Ive), Evelyne Axell, Joe Colombo, Ruth Francken, Konstantin Grcic, Quasar Khanh, Shiro Kuramata, Cesare Leonardi and Franca Stagi, Verner Panton, Gaetano Pesce, Ettore Sottsass and Perry King, Philippe Starck, Studio 65, and Roger Tallon. In 2016, the museum exhibited 240 previously unseen photographs by Charles and Ray Eames.

== See also ==
- List of design museums
- List of museums in Brussels
- Culture of Belgium
