= ING Arena =

Indoor arena in Brussels, Belgium

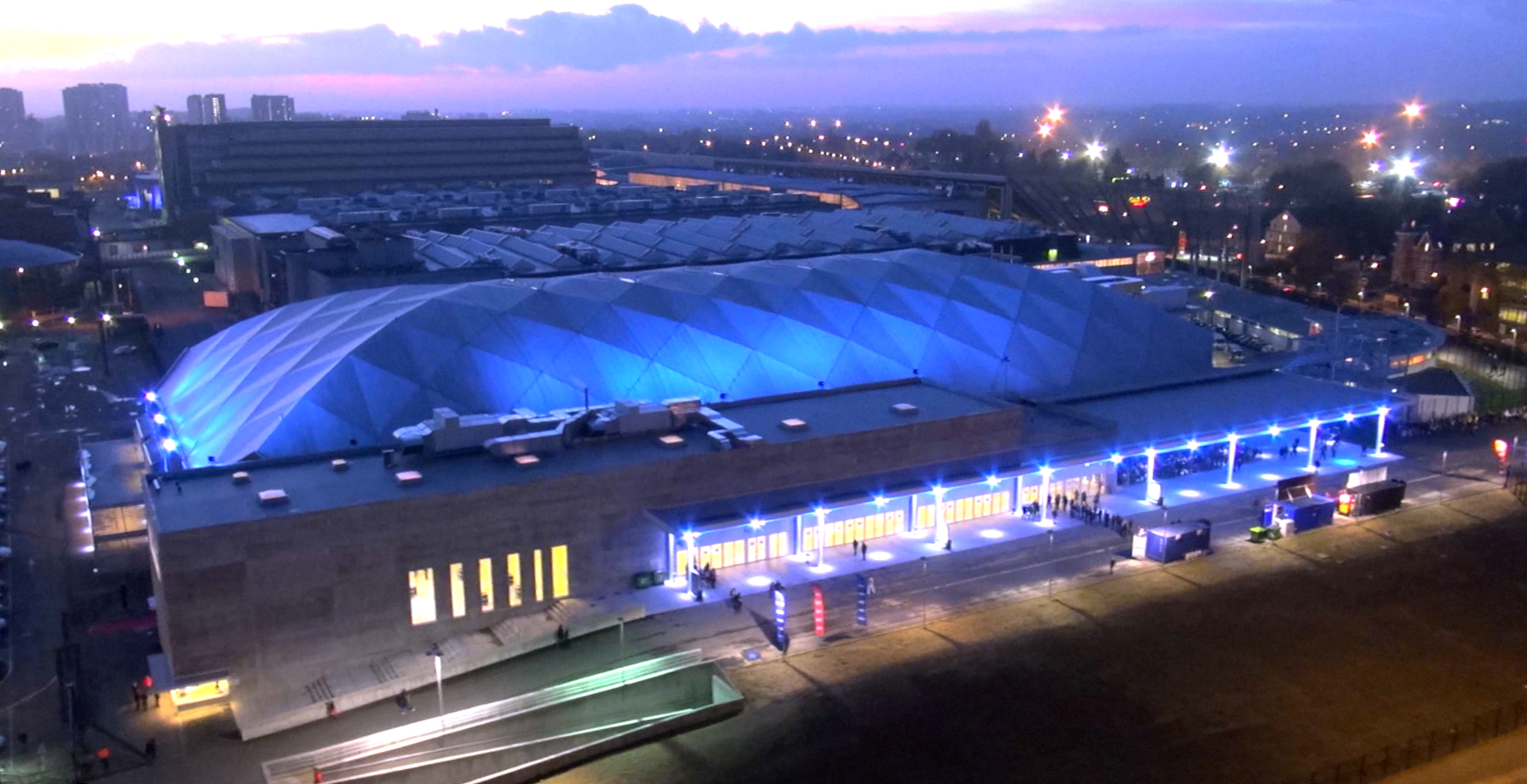
- Building from the outside
- Interactive map of ING Arena
- Former names: Palais 12 (French); Paleis 12 (Dutch)
- Location: Heysel/Heizel Plateau, Brussels-Capital Region, Belgium
- Coordinates: 50°54′03″N 4°20′32″E
- Capacity: 15,000
- Public transit: 6 Heysel/Heizel

Construction
- Groundbreaking: 1987
- Opened: 1989
- Renovated: 2011–2013
- Expanded: 2011–2013
- Architect: Alliage
- Structural engineer: Bureau Van Wetter
- General contractor: Verelst SA

Website
- Official website

The ING Arena is an indoor arena in Brussels, Belgium, that is part of the Brussels Expo complex. Located on the Heysel/Heizel Plateau in Laeken (northern part of the City of Brussels), it was originally built as the twelfth hall of the complex in 1989, but was extensively redesigned and reopened in its current form in September 2013. It now hosts major events, such as concerts, conferences, entertainment shows and major sporting events for a maximum capacity of 15,000 people.

The ING Arena forms the foundation stone for the NEO project, which aims to refurbish the Heysel Plateau into a new, modern, multipurpose neighbourhood in northern Brussels. Until 14 September 2023, the arena was known as the Palais 12 (French) or Paleis 12 (Dutch).

== Notable concerts and events ==
In 2016, the Dalai Lama was a guest at an event at the Palais 12. The Music Industry Awards have been presented annually in the hall since 2017. The 2017 Davis Cup World Group semifinals saw the Belgium Davis Cup team play Australia on 15–17 September. The hosts at the Palais 12 won the game 3–2 on clay.

The Palais 12 was one of nine venues for the 2019 Men's European Volleyball Championship held in Belgium, France, Netherlands and Slovenia.

Other notable concerts and events held in the arena include:

- 2013: David Guetta; Mylène Farmer; Elton John; Indochine; Riverdance
- 2014: Stromae; Scorpions; Kylie Minogue; Drake; André Rieu; Il Divo; Peter Gabriel; Calogero; John Newman; Elbow; Cliff Richard
- 2015: 5 Seconds of Summer; Ennio Morricone; Nicki Minaj; Johnny Hallyday; Santana; Eros Ramazzotti; Major Lazer; André Rieu; Supertramp; Oscar and the Wolf; Violetta; Shaka Ponk; Editors; The Prodigy; Faithless; 2015 League of Legends World Championship;
- 2016: Massive Attack; Muse; Queen + Adam Lambert
- 2017: Martina Stoessel
- 2018: Soy Luna
- 2019: Nicki Minaj; Take That; Twenty One Pilots
- 2023: Eurosong 2023; Chris Brown; Fally Ipupa
- 2024: Ado; Miku Expo
- 2025: ATEEZ, Sabrina Carpenter, Taemin, Ferre Gola, Koffi Olomidé

== See also ==
- Brussels Expo
- List of indoor arenas in Belgium
