= Heysel Plateau =

Neighbourhood, park and exhibition space in Brussels, Belgium

Heysel: Heysel (French); Heizel (Dutch); Plateau du Heysel (French); Heizelplateau (Dutch)
- Neighbourhood
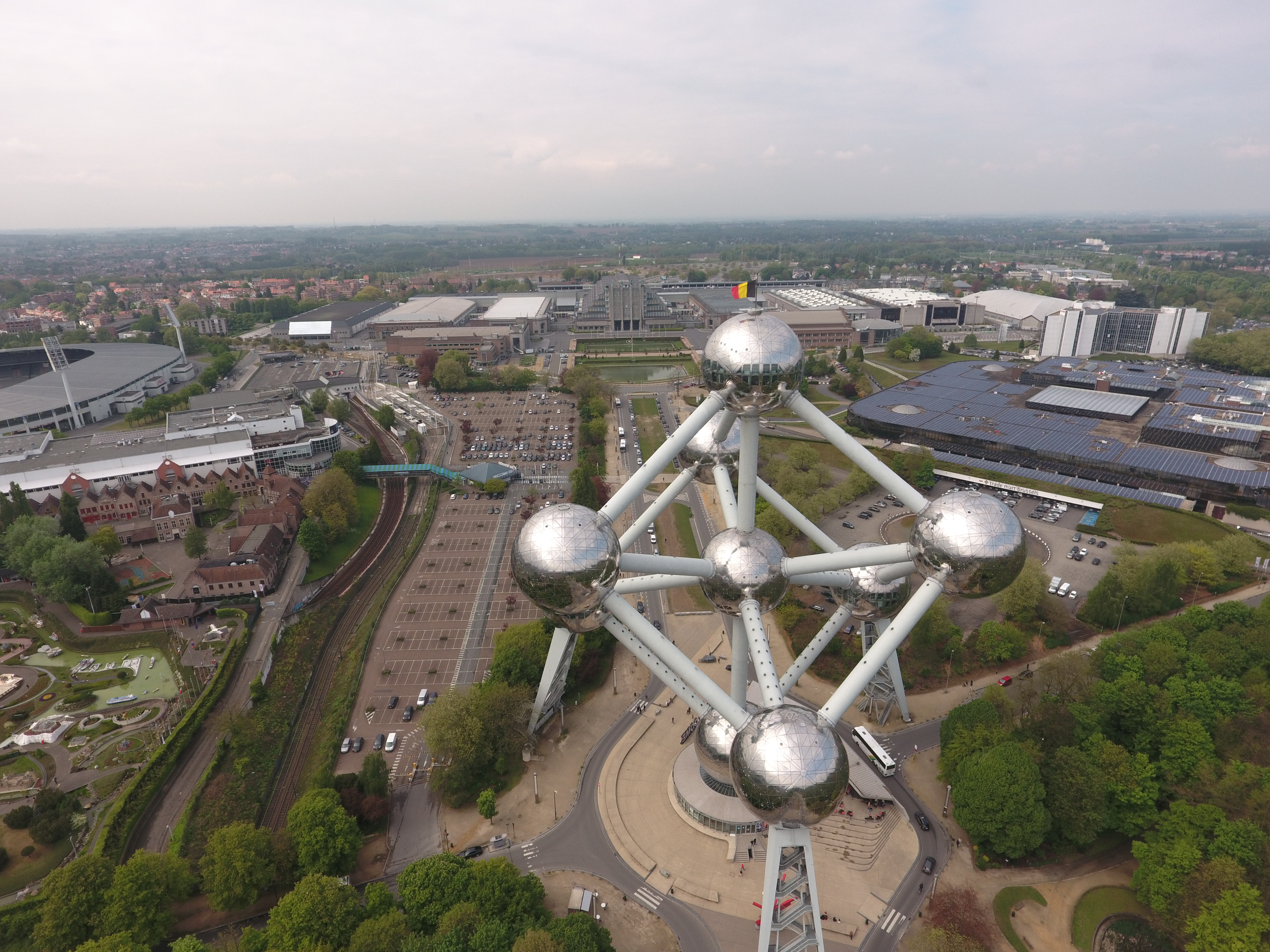
- Panoramic view of the Heysel/Heizel with the Atomium in the foreground

- Location within Brussels Heysel (Belgium)
- Country: Belgium
- Region: Brussels-Capital Region
- Arrondissement: Brussels-Capital
- Municipality: City of Brussels
- First mention: 1152 (as Ossengem)
- Time zone: UTC+1 (CET)
  - Summer (DST): UTC+2 (CEST)
- Postal code: 1120
- Area codes: 02

The Heysel (French: [ɛzɛl]) or Heizel (Dutch: [ˈɦɛizəl]), sometimes the Heysel Plateau (French: Plateau du Heysel [plato dy ezɛl]; Dutch: Heizelplateau [ˈɦɛizəlplaːˌtoː]) or Heysel Park (French: Parc du Heysel [paʁk dy ezɛl]; Dutch: Heizelpark [ˈɦɛizəlˌpɑr(ə)k]), is a neighbourhood, park and exhibition space in Laeken, in the north-west of the City of Brussels, Belgium, where the Brussels International Exposition of 1935 and the 1958 Brussels World's Fair (Expo 58) took place.

The Atomium, a symbolic 102-metre-tall (335 ft) modernist structure, originally built for Expo 58, is the main monument on the Heysel Plateau and is now considered a landmark of Brussels. Opposite it, the Centenary Palace is one of the lasting remaining buildings of the 1935 World's Fair. It was also the venue for the 32nd Eurovision Song Contest in 1987. It is now home to the Brussels Exhibition Centre (Brussels Expo), the city's most important event complex in Belgium and the largest exhibition space in the Benelux.

The Heysel Plateau was also the location of the Heysel Stadium, Belgium's former national stadium, originally built in 1930. After the Heysel Stadium disaster of 1985 at the European Cup final, it was demolished and in its place the King Baudouin Stadium was built. The Bruparck entertainment park (with among others Mini-Europe miniature park and Kinepolis cinema) and the Planetarium of the Royal Observatory of Belgium are also located there, as is the Palais 12/Paleis 12, a large and modern multiuse indoor arena.

== Toponymy ==
The French name Heysel derives from the Dutch word heizel, meaning "meager pasture" or "hill". There is also evidence of a brook in the Middle Ages, the Heyselbeek, a tributary of the Molenbeek brook, formed from several sources on the heights of Osseghem/Ossegem. Heyssel is retained as a toponym on the Huvenne map of 1848 and in the Geographical Dictionary of Letter Posts of the Kingdom of Belgium of 1857.

The terms Heysel in French and Heizel in Dutch have in fact gradually imposed themselves to fairly broadly designate this district of Laeken, to the detriment of two other toponyms, which designate more precise parts of it: Hossegem Dries to the north-west, at the current location of Osseghem Park, and Kauwenberg to the south-east, around the Chapel of St. Anne.

== History ==
=== Rural beginnings ===
The Osseghem/Ossegem estate on the Heysel Plateau was first mentioned in the Early Middle Ages and may have been on the site of a former Roman villa. In 1152, a sale of the Hof van Ossegem by the heirs of Meinard van Brussel to Affligem Abbey is documented, which also included the old Church of Our Lady of Laeken. This church, whose origins date back to the 8th century, was located nearby, as was the Chapel of St. Anne with its miraculous spring, which attracted many pilgrims.

During the Ancien Régime, the Heysel Plateau was still largely owned by the Affligem fathers, and the area belonged to the parish of Laeken. At the height of the plateau were two other hamlets: Verregat and Osseghem. The latter was found just south of today's King Baudouin Stadium and gave its name to today's Osseghem Park, while Verregat was further north, near the Chaussée Romaine/Romeinse Steenweg, where the Verregat residential area is today.

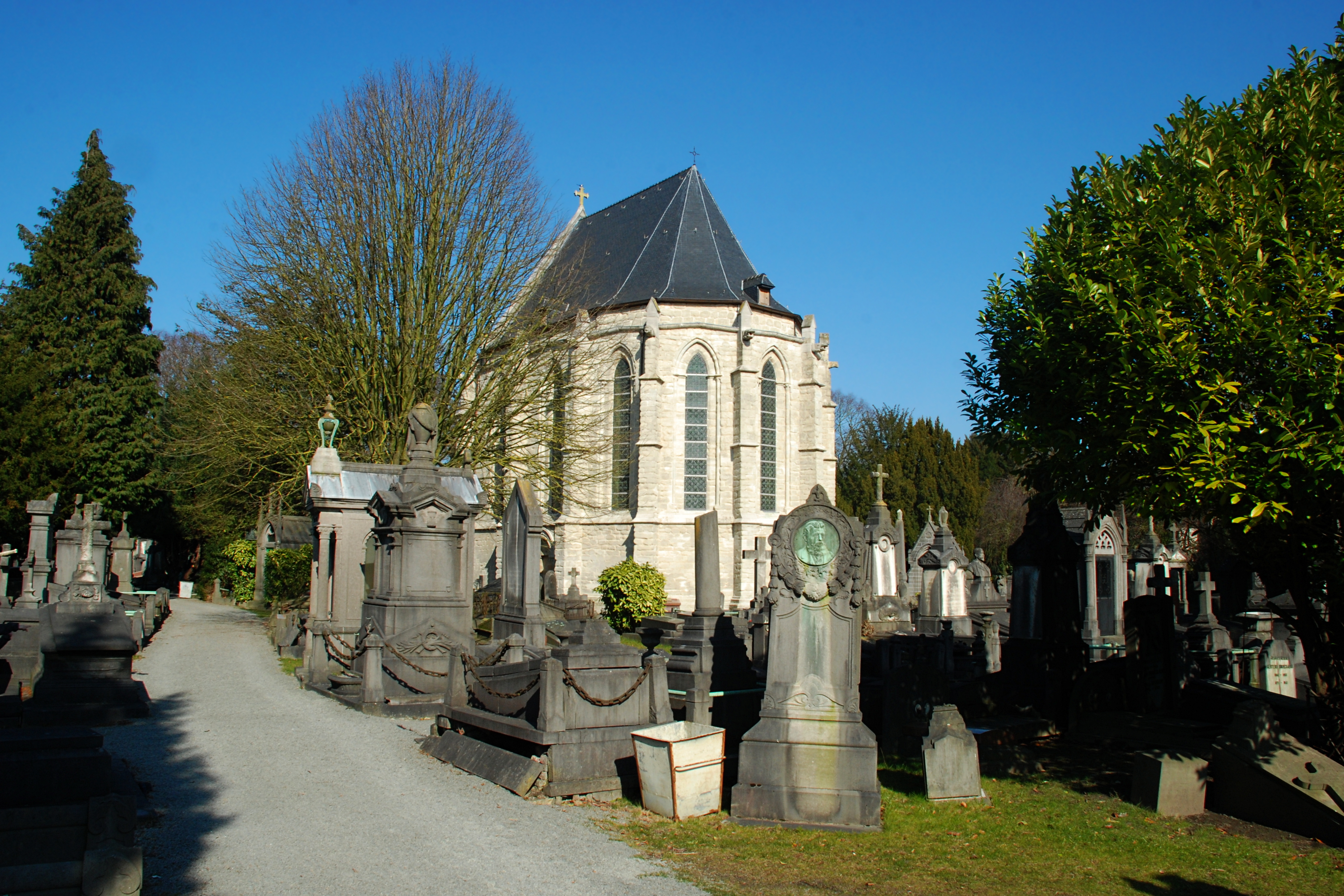
Choir of the old Church of Our Lady of Laeken in Laeken Cemetery

In the 16th century, the Coensborgh Castle occupied an island on a pond formed by the Molenbeek. It was the property of the Meeûs family in the 17th century. In the 18th century, the beauty of the landscape motivated the construction of the Château of Stuyvenberg in 1725, the Palace of Schonenberg (today's Royal Palace of Laeken) between 1782 and 1784, and the Belvédère Château in 1788. The Ferraris map of 1777 does not show these first two châteaux but indicates the Osseghem farm, located a little south of the current King Baudouin Stadium. The Osseghem farm grew into a small village, which, in the 18th century, also included a Speelhuys, a pavilion where the Archbishop of Mechelen stayed when visiting Brussels.

Numerous quarries were also operated on the Heysel Plateau, which supplied the building material for, among other things, the Abbey Church of Affligem, the Church of Our Lady of Scherpenheuvel, the Jesuit Church in Antwerp and the Church of Our Lady of Finisterrae in central Brussels. Quarrying ceased towards the end of the 17th century, though traces can still be seen on the slopes to the east, in the Kattenberg and the depressions in Osseghem Park.

=== 19th-century urbanisation ===
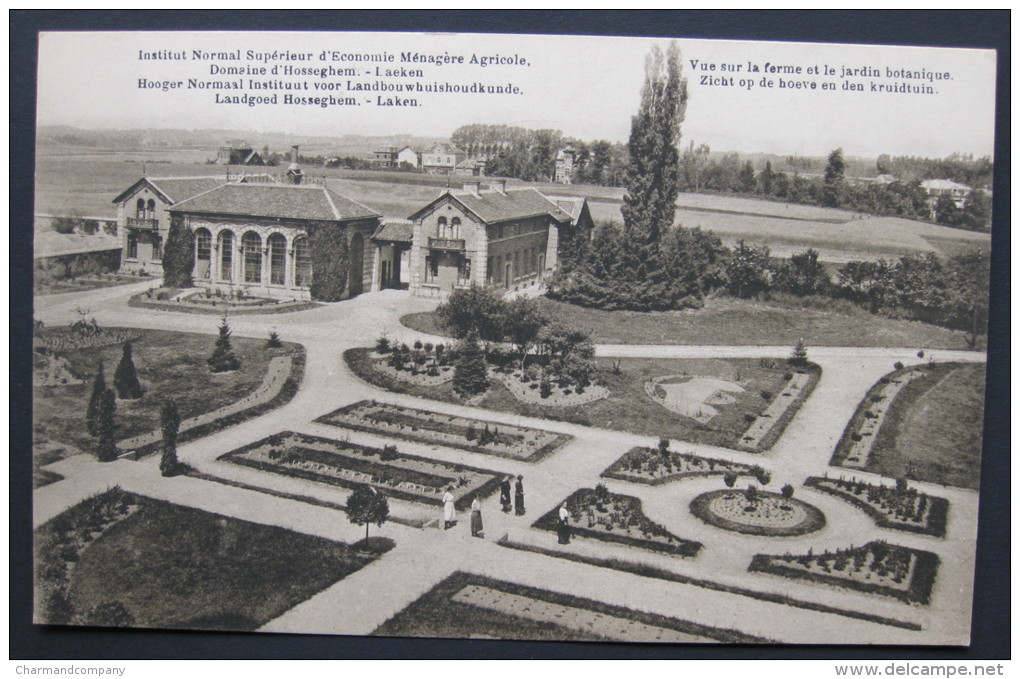
Former Institute of Agricultural Home Economics of Osseghem

At the end of the 19th century, the Heysel still had a distinctly rural character, although there were already plans to develop it into a new urban area. In 1850, the Belgian government authorised the construction of a new Church of Our Lady of Laeken, intended to replace the medieval building (destroyed except for its choir, which is still visible in the cemetery adjacent to the current church). King Leopold I himself laid the first stone in 1854, although the new church, much larger than the old one, was not completed until 1909. In 1869, a school was inaugurated in the hamlet, probably on the Rue du Heysel/Heizelstraat. The Rue du Heysel itself was attested in an official document in 1875, and stretched between the Ancienne chaussée de Meysse/Oude Meisesesteenweg and the Rue de la Cave/Kelderstraat (today's Rue Émile Wauters/Emile Wautersstraat). The Villa Van der Borght was built in 1885 at the bottom of what is now the Boulevard du Centenaire/Eeuwfeestlaan, which was not yet laid out (the building will be razed in 1956), followed by the Church of St. Lambert around 1890.

Upon ascending to the throne, in 1865, King Leopold II was concerned with the construction of a memorial to his father in the perspective of the Royal Palace of Laeken. The development of a surrounding public park was approved in 1867. Laeken Park was gradually developed between 1876 and 1880 based on plans by the German landscape architect Édouard Keilig, associated with the civil engineer Louis Van Schoubroeck. The park and the monument were completed in 1880, in time for the 50th anniversary of Belgian independence. The king acquired more land on the Heysel in 1899. Plans to enlarge the Royal Palace lead to the demolition of the barracks located on its right flank, where a detachment of grenadiers, responsible since 1840 for the surveillance of the royal palaces, had been stationed. A new barracks was constructed between 1899 and 1902, in a neo-Flemish Renaissance style, according to the plans of the architect Jules-Jacques Van Ysendyck. The buildings are now made available by Belgium for the European School, Brussels IV. In 1905, the 75th anniversary of the country's independence was celebrated with great fanfare, among others in Laeken Park. Later, the Institute of Agricultural Home Economics, a girls' school for agriculture and domestic science, was also set up in Osseghem.

=== Later development (1920s–present) ===
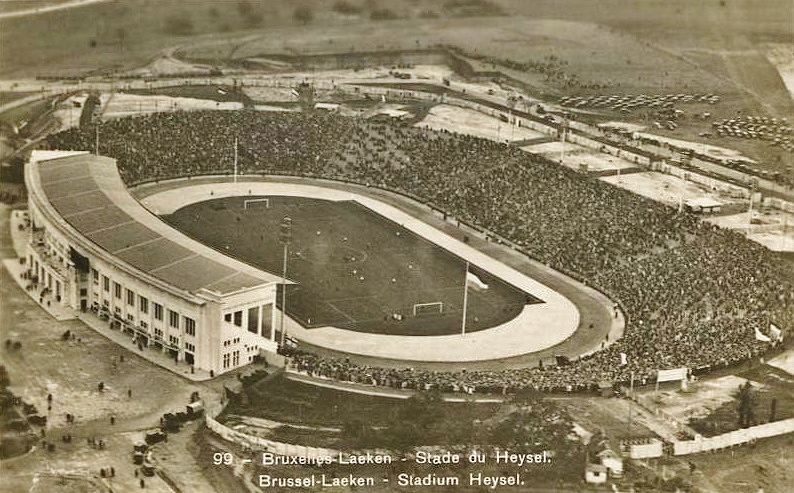
View of the Jubilee Stadium in 1935

After the municipality of Laeken was annexed by the City of Brussels in 1921, the Belgian state transferred some of Leopold II's former land to the city. Since the Parc du Cinquantenaire/Jubelpark had become too cramped, Brussels' authorities wished to develop the Heysel into a new exhibition and conference location of international stature for the Belgian capital. The Centenary Palace complex (French: Palais du Centenaire, Dutch: Eeuwfeestpaleis) was designed by the architect Joseph Van Neck to house the 1935 World's Fair. The Jubilee Stadium on the Heysel was completed in 1930 as part of the centenary celebrations of the Belgian Revolution. It was renamed the Heysel Stadium after the Second World War, and then the King Baudouin Stadium in 1995.

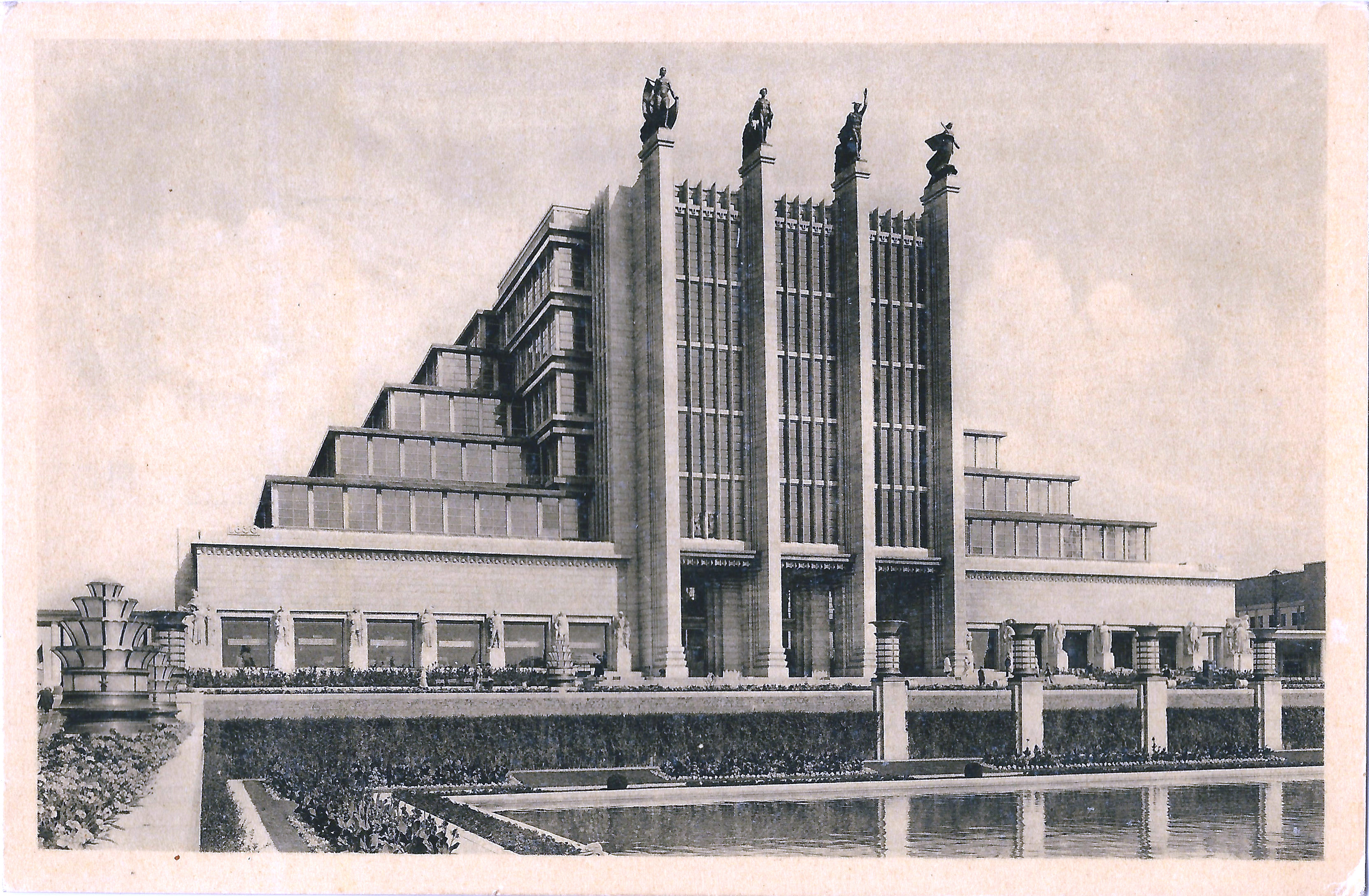
The Palais des Expositions during the 1935 World's Fair

In the 1950s, the Heysel underwent another major change in preparation for the 1958 Brussels World's Fair (Expo 58). On that occasion, 58 additional buildings were constructed, as well as the Atomium, a symbolic 103-metre-tall (338 ft) modernist structure by the architect André Waterkeyn. It consists of nine steel spheres connected by tubes, and forms a model of an iron crystal (specifically, a unit cell), magnified 165 billion times. Originally devoted to science, it would become a landmark of Brussels. Following the fair, most of the exhibition pavilions were gradually demolished, including a few, particularly emblematic, such as the Philips Pavilion by Le Corbusier and the Flèche du Génie civil sculpture, dynamited in 1970. The Atomium remains the main vestige of this period.

The Brussels Exhibition Centre (Brussels Expo) gradually expanded between 1977 and 1998 with the construction of the Palais 11/Paleis 11, the Palais 12/Paleis 12, and the Auditorium. It now has twelve halls, linked together by covered galleries, and currently occupies 22 ha (54 acres) of land, making it the most important event complex in the city and the largest exhibition space in the Benelux. The year 1985 was marked by the Heysel Stadium disaster, a crowd disaster, which caused 39 deaths during the final of the European Cup. Since then, the stadium has been redeveloped and renamed the King Baudouin Stadium. That same year, the Heysel/Heizel metro station opened. In 1987, the 32nd Eurovision Song Contest was organised in the Centenary Palace.

== Future ==
=== Potential European Quarter ===
The Heysel Project was a potential European Union (EU) "quarter" development in the Heysel. As part of that project, the area surrounding the Atomium would have become, on the long term, a location for some of the European Commission's buildings, according to a draft project developed by the City of Brussels.

The City of Brussels had previously decided to allocate this area to "infrastructures dedicated to the international vocation of Brussels" and planned to erect a convention centre of "international dimensions" with a capacity of 3,500 seats and an "important commercial centre." In January 2009, the Commission's then-spokeswoman Valerie Rampi confirmed that the EU executive was considering several proposals for a new location, with some 100,000 m^{2} (1,100,000 sq ft) of office space. On 15 September 2008, a draft entitled "Application file for the Heysel plain to host a new European quarter" was issued.

According to the draft project, the Heysel was to host a new branch of the European School, where EU officials educate their children in their native tongues. This was made true in 2012 with the European School, Brussels IV's move from Forest to its purpose built campus on the plateau. The area lies on a direct subway line connecting it to Brussels' current European Quarter. The existing parking facilities, the biggest in Belgium, were also presented as a plus, as well as the planned new residential area and the proximity of parks and leisure facilities. The European Quarter would have remained the centre of the Commission's activities, but the body was also looking for "additional poles outside" this central area, in order to exert a downward pressure on property prices, according to Siim Kallas, the EU's then-Commissioner for Administrative Affairs.

=== NEO project ===
In 2009, a new project called NEO was launched to renovate the Heysel. This new plan provides for the construction of 590 housing units, a new shopping centre called Mall of Europe and a new amusement park, as well as a new sports park. The total cost is estimated at €1 billion. The town planning permit was issued and the project is scheduled for completion by 2030. On 16 October 2020, the then-mayor of the City of Brussels, Philippe Close, announced the definitive abandonment of part of the project, in particular the Congress Centre, but part of it, such as the mall, will remain.

== Gallery ==
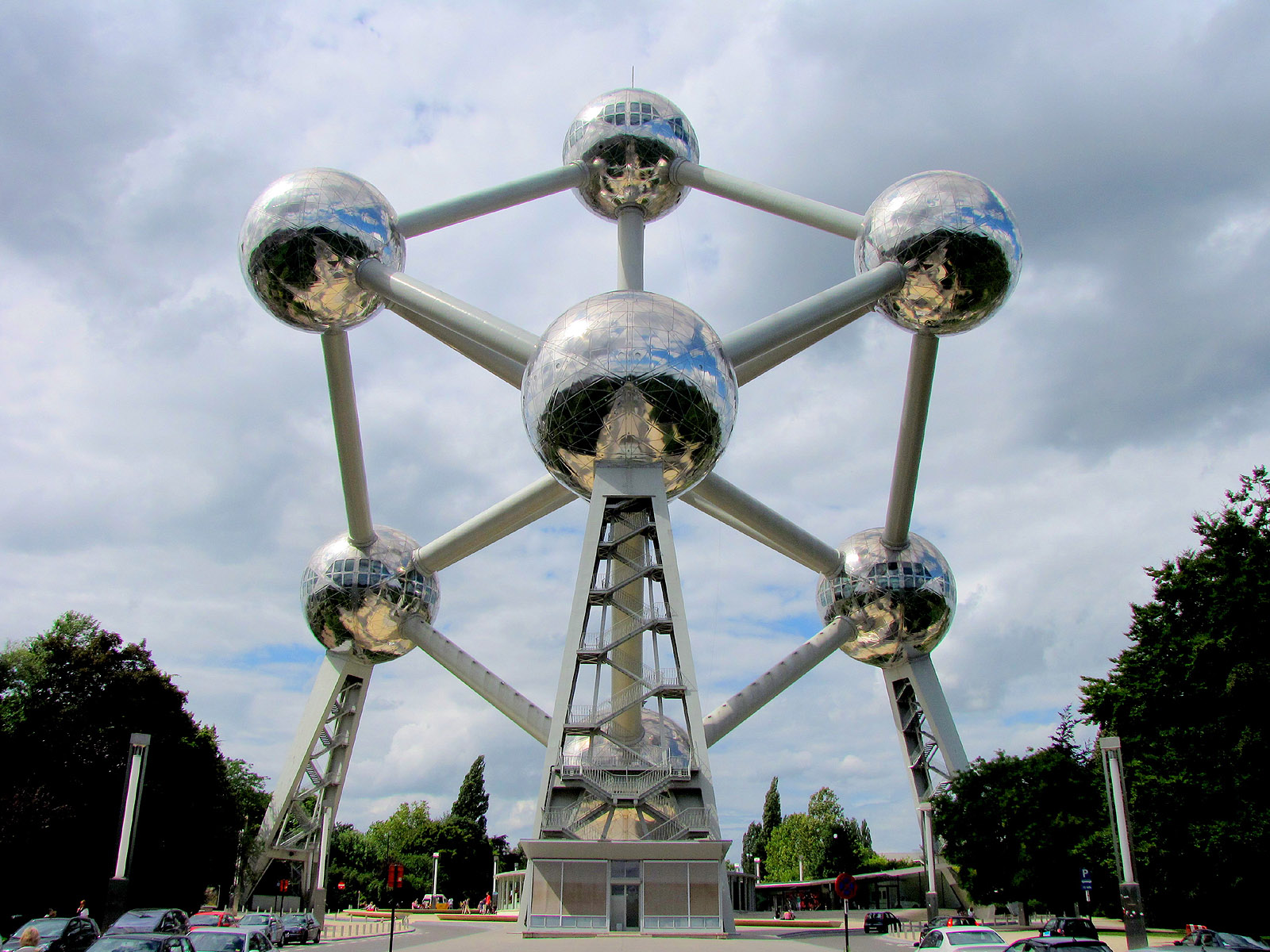
The Atomium

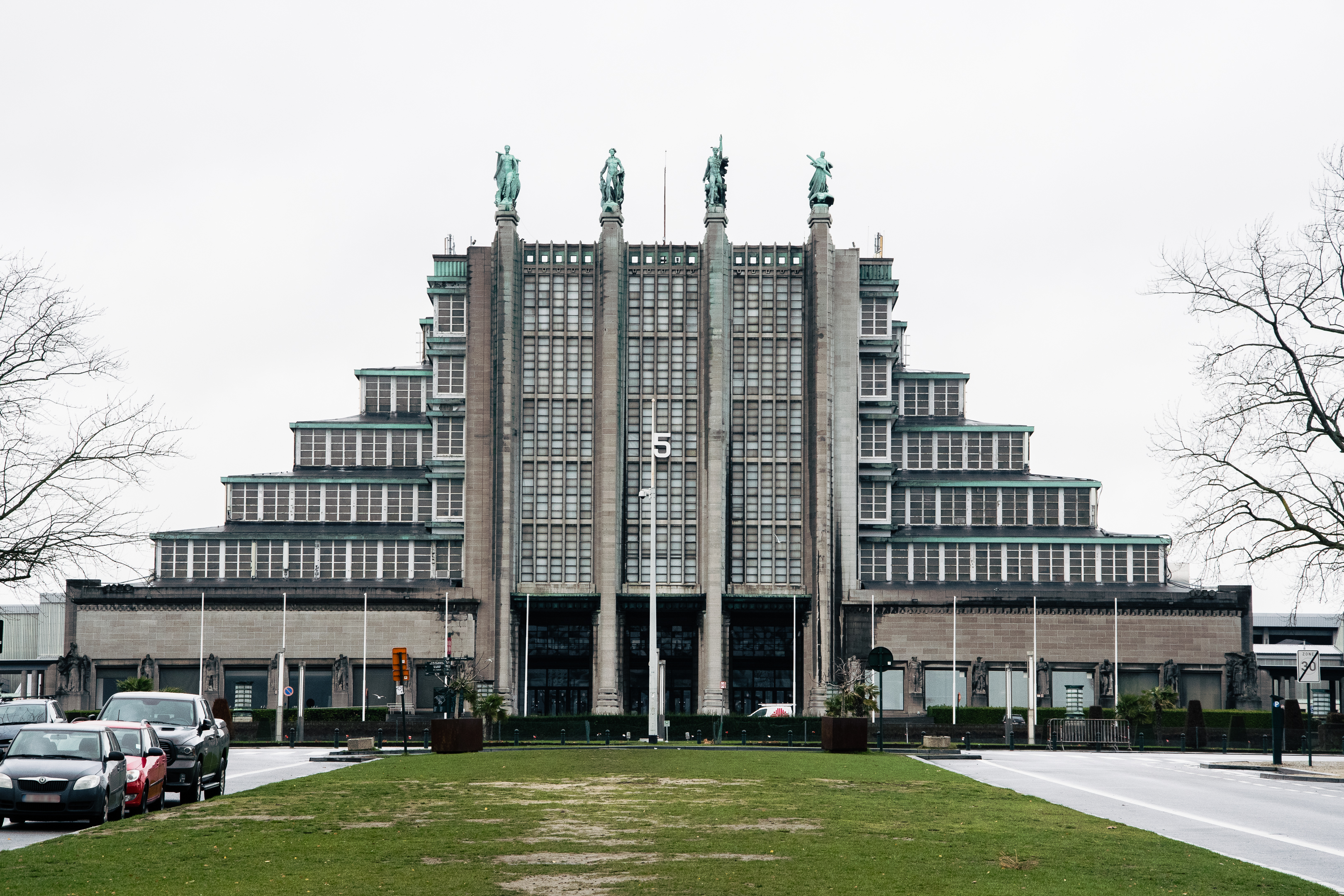
Centenary Palace

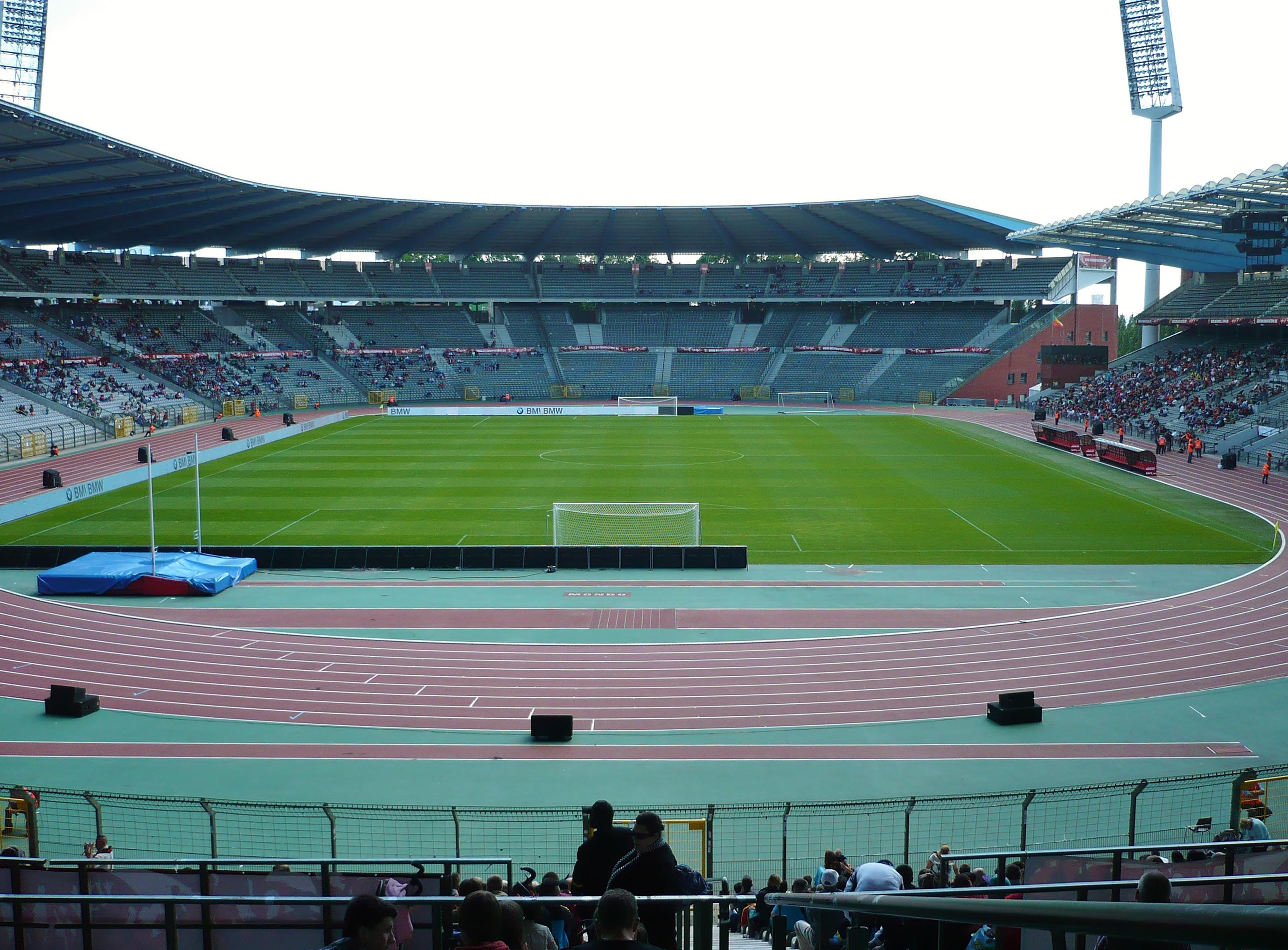
King Baudouin Stadium

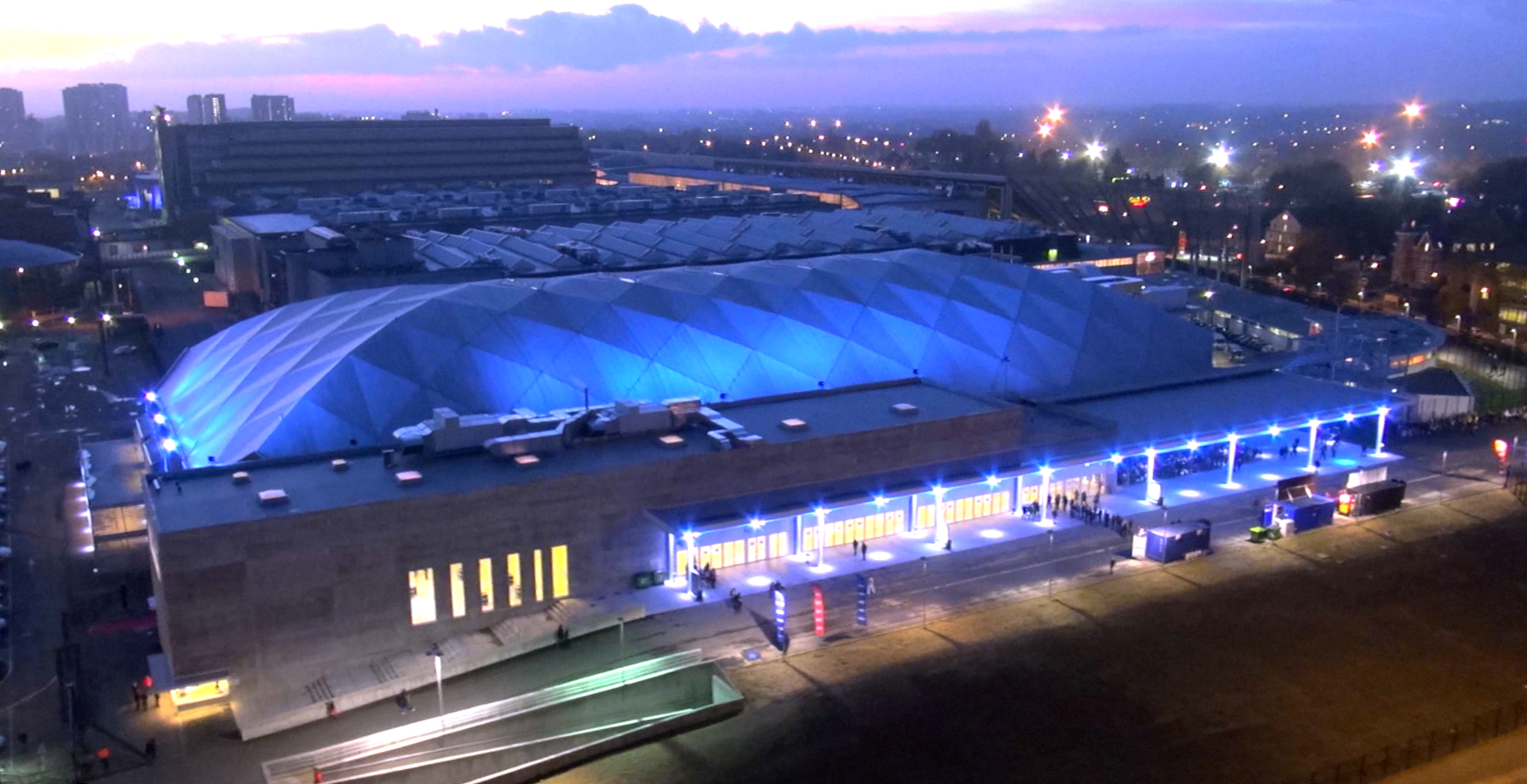
Palais 12/Paleis 12

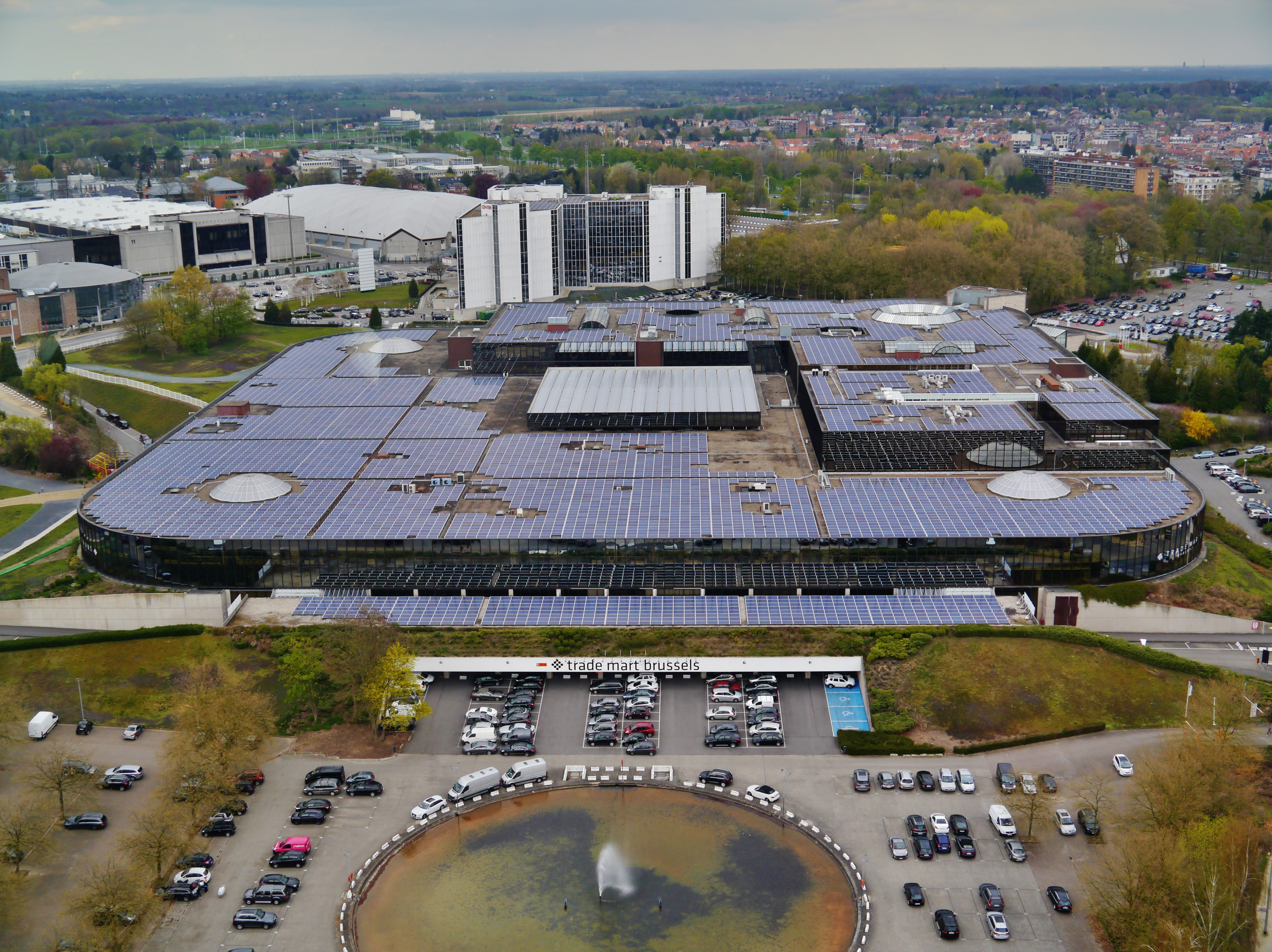
Trademart

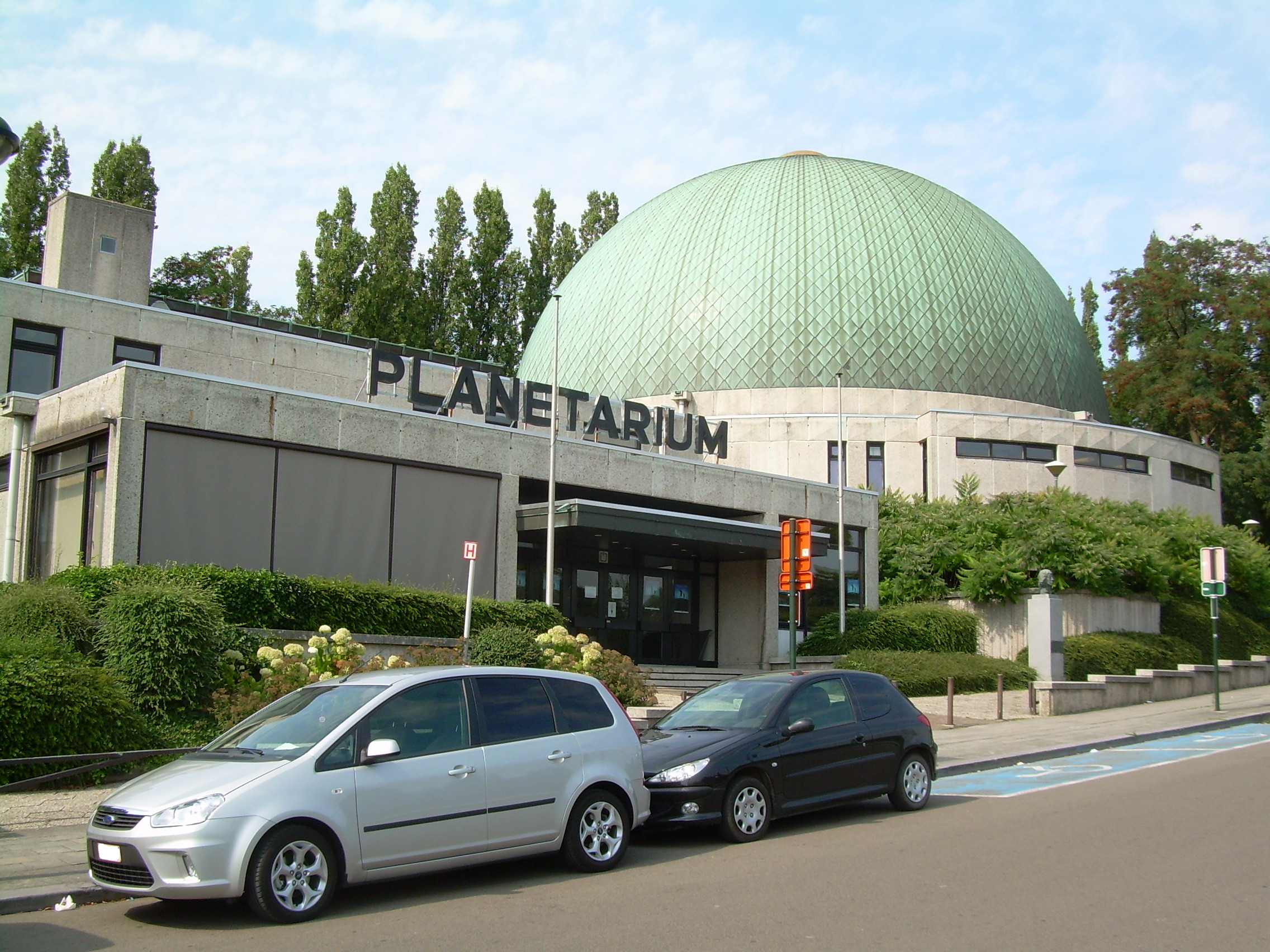
Planetarium

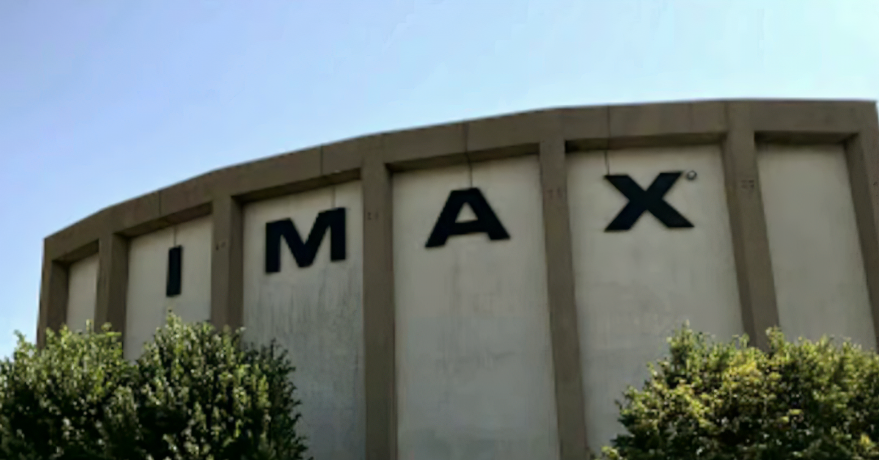
Kinepolis Brussels

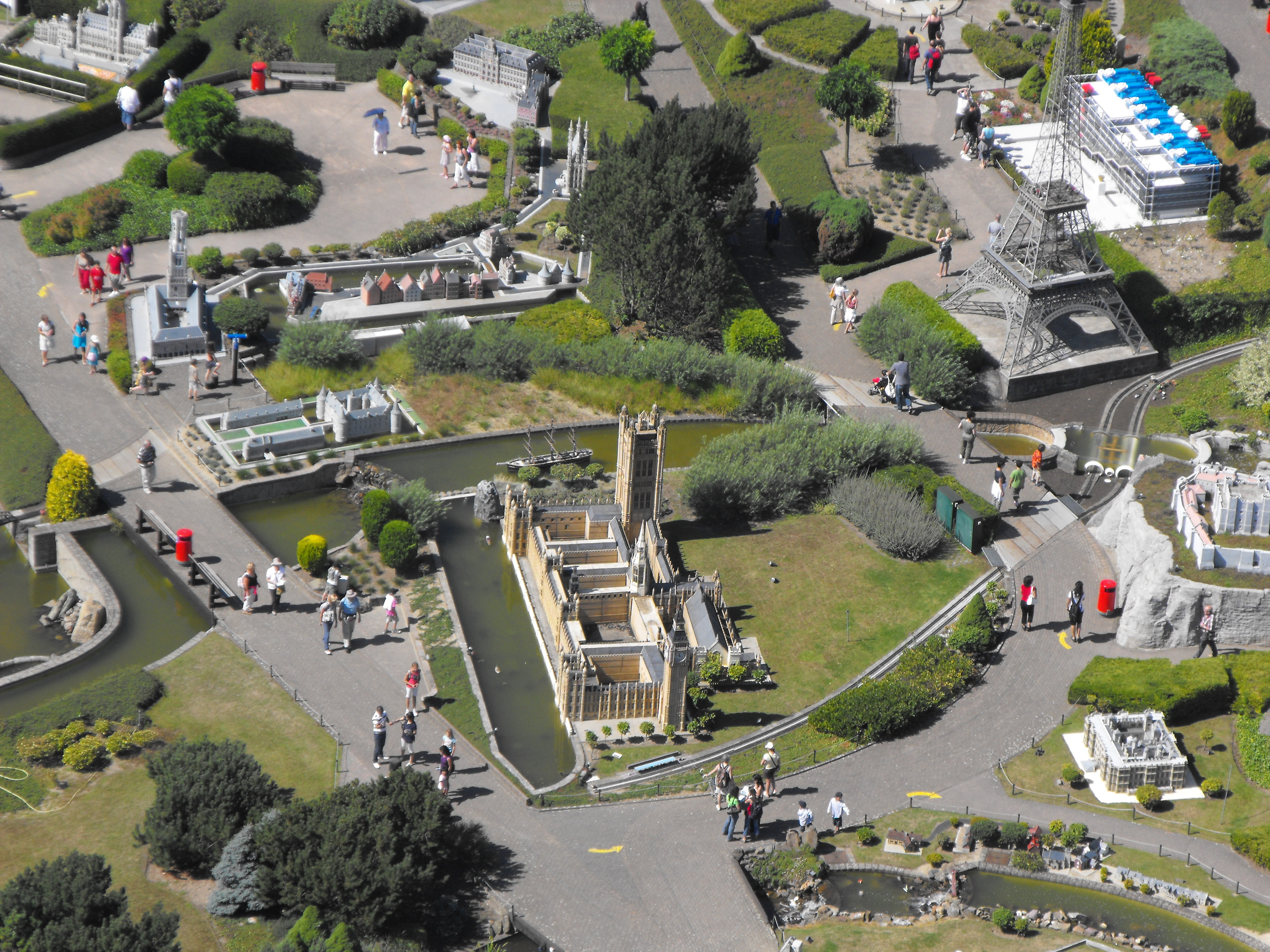
Mini-Europe

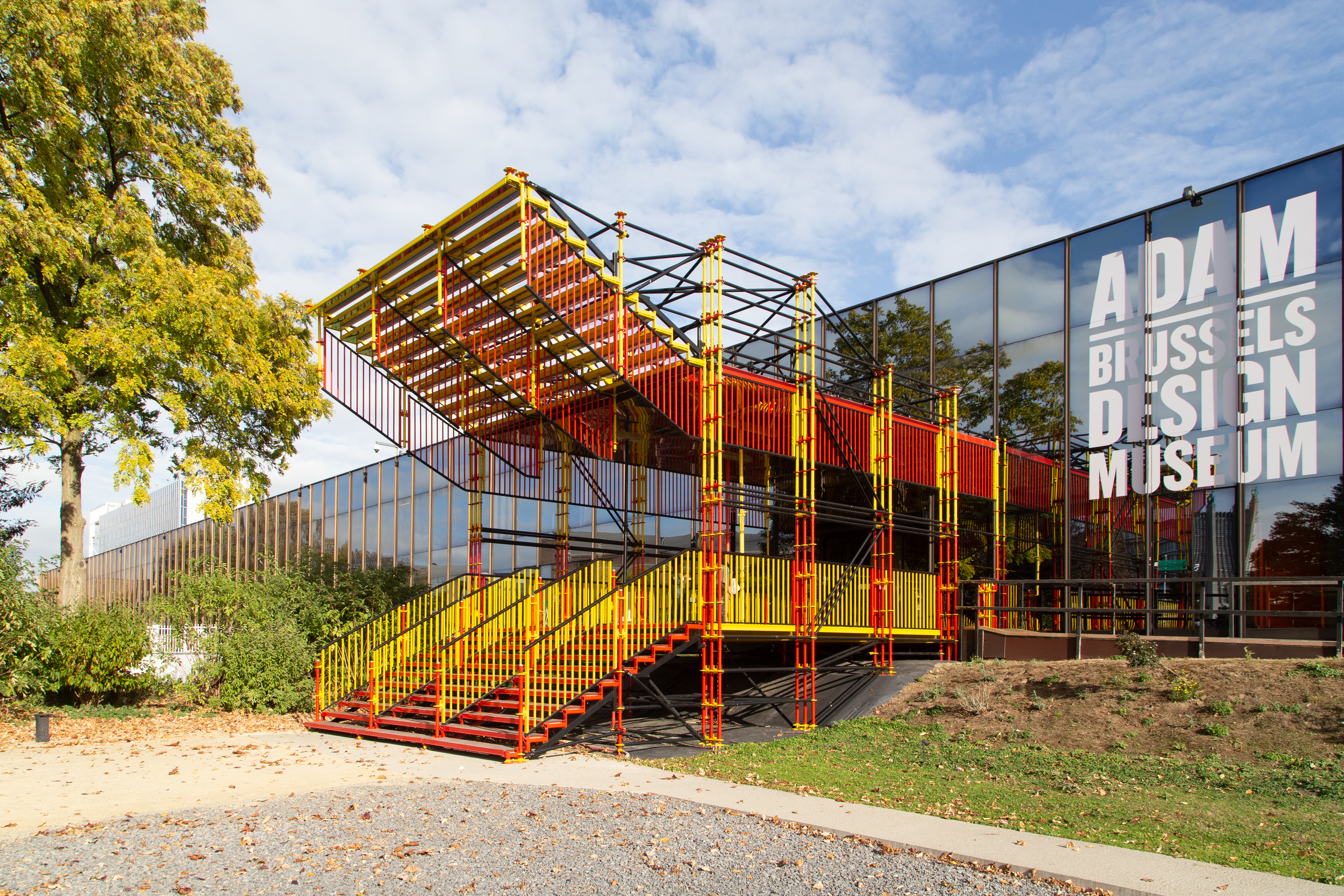
Design Museum Brussels

== See also ==
- Neighbourhoods in Brussels
- History of Brussels
- Culture of Belgium
- Belgium in the long nineteenth century
