= Brussels Expo =

Primary event complex in Brussels, Belgium

Brussels Exhibition Centre Brussels Expo
- Parc des Expositions de Bruxelles (French); Tentoonstellingspark van Brussel (Dutch)
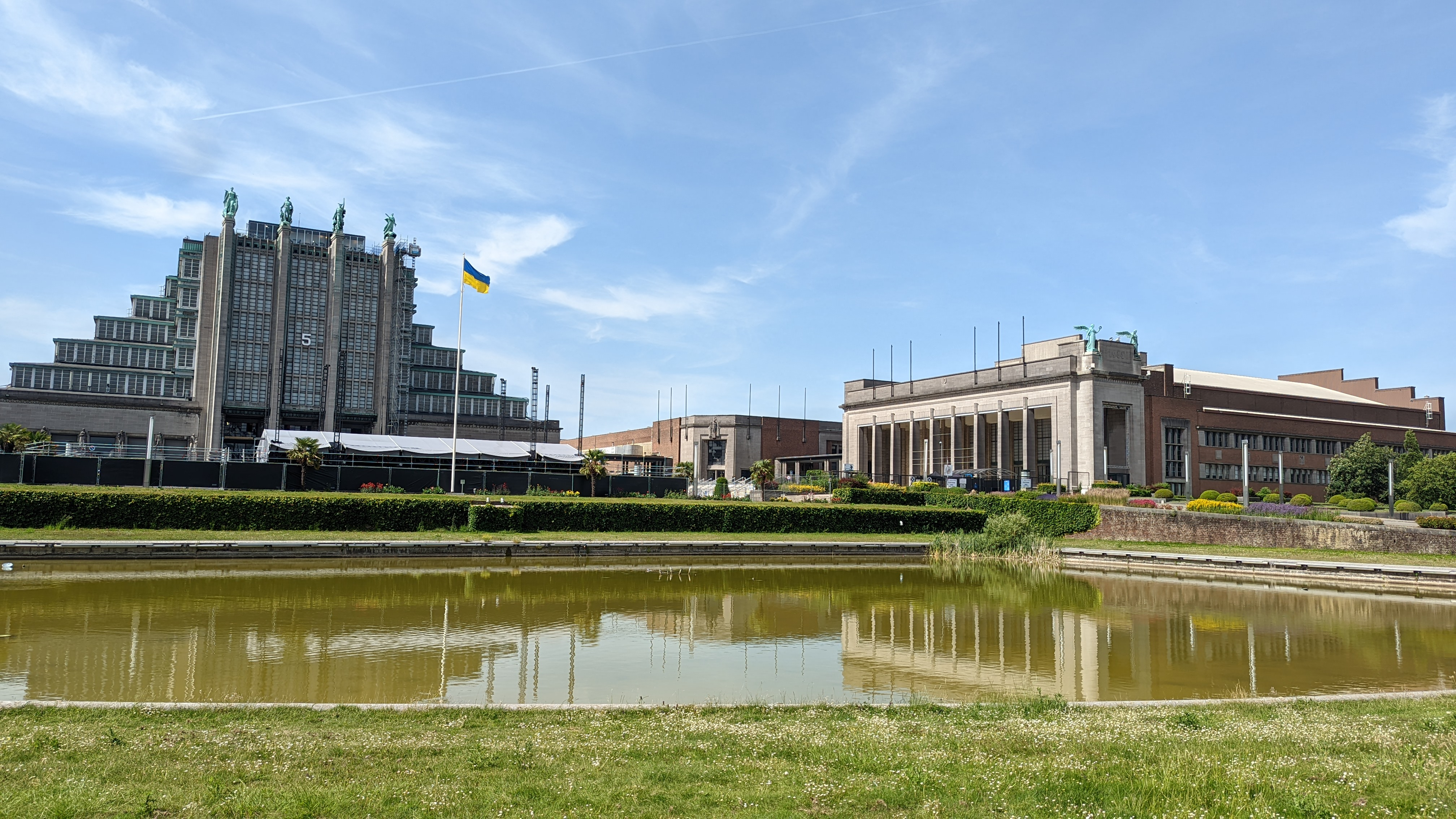
- Brussels Exhibition Centre (Brussels Expo), including the Centenary Palace (Palais 5/Paleis 5), Palais 6/Paleis 6 and Palais 10/Paleis 10
- Interactive map of the Brussels Exhibition Centre; Brussels Expo area

General information
- Type: Exhibition space
- Architectural style: Art Deco
- Location: Place de Belgique / Belgiëplein 1, 1020 Laeken, City of Brussels, Brussels-Capital Region, Belgium
- Coordinates: 50°53′59″N 4°20′17″E
- Construction started: 1931
- Inaugurated: 1935

Design and construction
- Architect: Joseph Van Neck

Other information
- Public transit: 6 Heysel/Heizel

Website
- www.brussels-expo.com

The Brussels Exhibition Centre (French: Parc des Expositions de Bruxelles; Dutch: Tentoonstellingspark van Brussel), also known as Brussels Expo, is the primary event complex in Brussels, Belgium. Located on the Heysel/Heizel Plateau in Laeken (northern part of the City of Brussels), the twelve halls that comprise it are used for the largest national and international trade fairs, exhibitions and other events. With 115,000 m^{2} (1,240,000 sq ft) of facility space, they constitute the largest exhibition space in the Benelux. They are also a witness to the evolution of construction techniques during the 20th century.

== History ==
The construction of the Brussels Exhibition Centre began in 1931, when five halls were built for the Brussels International Exposition of 1935 to celebrate the centenary of Belgian independence. The Palais 5/Paleis 5, informally known as the Centenary Palace (French: Palais du Centenaire, Dutch: Eeuwfeestpaleis), was the most ornamental of these first five halls and is still in use today.

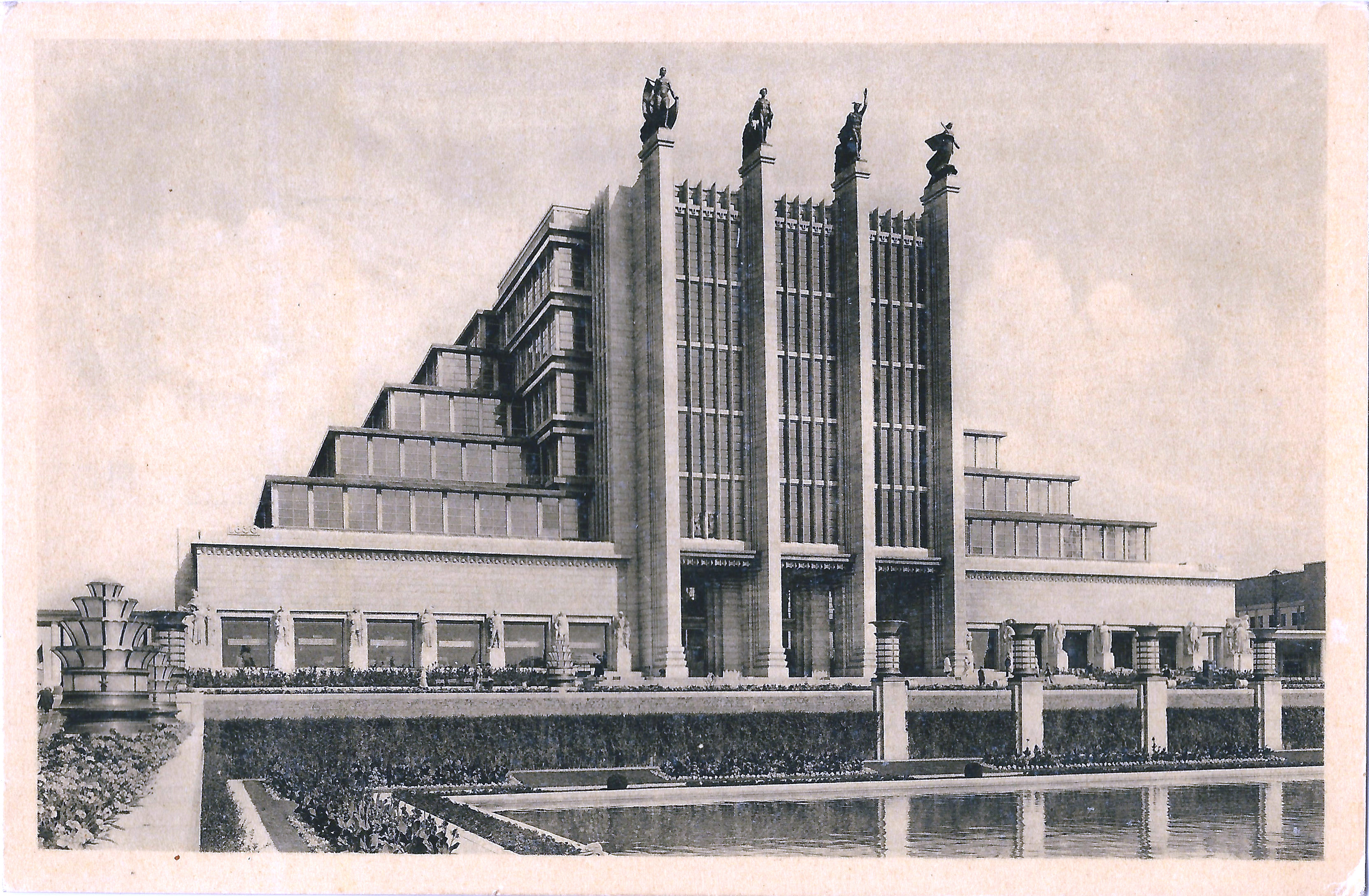
The Palais des Expositions during the 1935 World's Fair

After the World's Fair, expositions, trade fairs, congresses and other events took place in the halls. At the end of the 1940s, the Palais 4/Paleis 4 was added, and by 1957 also the Palais/Paleis 7, 8, 9, as well as the patio. In 1958, 58 additional buildings were constructed in preparation of the 1958 Brussels World's Fair (Expo 58), and the Atomium was also erected nearby. It would become one of the symbols of Brussels. The Palais 11/Paleis 11 was built in 1977, the Palais 12/Paleis 12 in 1989 and the Auditorium in 1993.

In recent years, some of the existing halls were renovated and modernised. The 32nd edition of the Eurovision Song Contest took place in the Centenary Palace in 1987. The Palais 12/Paleis 12 was also redesigned and reopened in its current form in 2013. It now hosts major events, such as big concerts, conferences, shows and major sporting events for a maximum capacity of 15,000 people.

== Exhibition spaces ==
The venue has twelve main halls and several other exhibition areas, as well as twelve conference rooms. The main conference hall, Auditorium 2000, offers almost 2,000 seats, while the Palais 12/Paleis 12, a large indoor arena that hosts concerts and spectacles, has up to 15,000 seats. The parking areas have room for 12,000 cars, and are easily accessible from the Brussels Ring.

The Centenary Palace, designed by the architect Joseph Van Neck in Art Deco style, is one of the remaining buildings of the 1935 World's Fair. Its impressive dimensions—nearly 165 by 90 metres (541 ft × 295 ft)—made it the largest of the exhibition's 182 pavilions. With its arches of unequalled size, it was also, at the time, the largest covered space in Belgium and had the world's largest reinforced concrete frame. During Expo 58, it served as the exhibition's entrance hall. On that occasion, its façade was hidden behind a nearly 20-metre-long (66 ft) temporary mask covered with 94 bronze stars and a copper dove designed by the architects-engineers Jacques Dupuis, Albert Bontridder and André Paduart. The Palace also hosted the 32nd Eurovision Song Contest in 1987. Currently, it is still being used for trade fairs, as well as concerts, usually for bigger acts and artists.

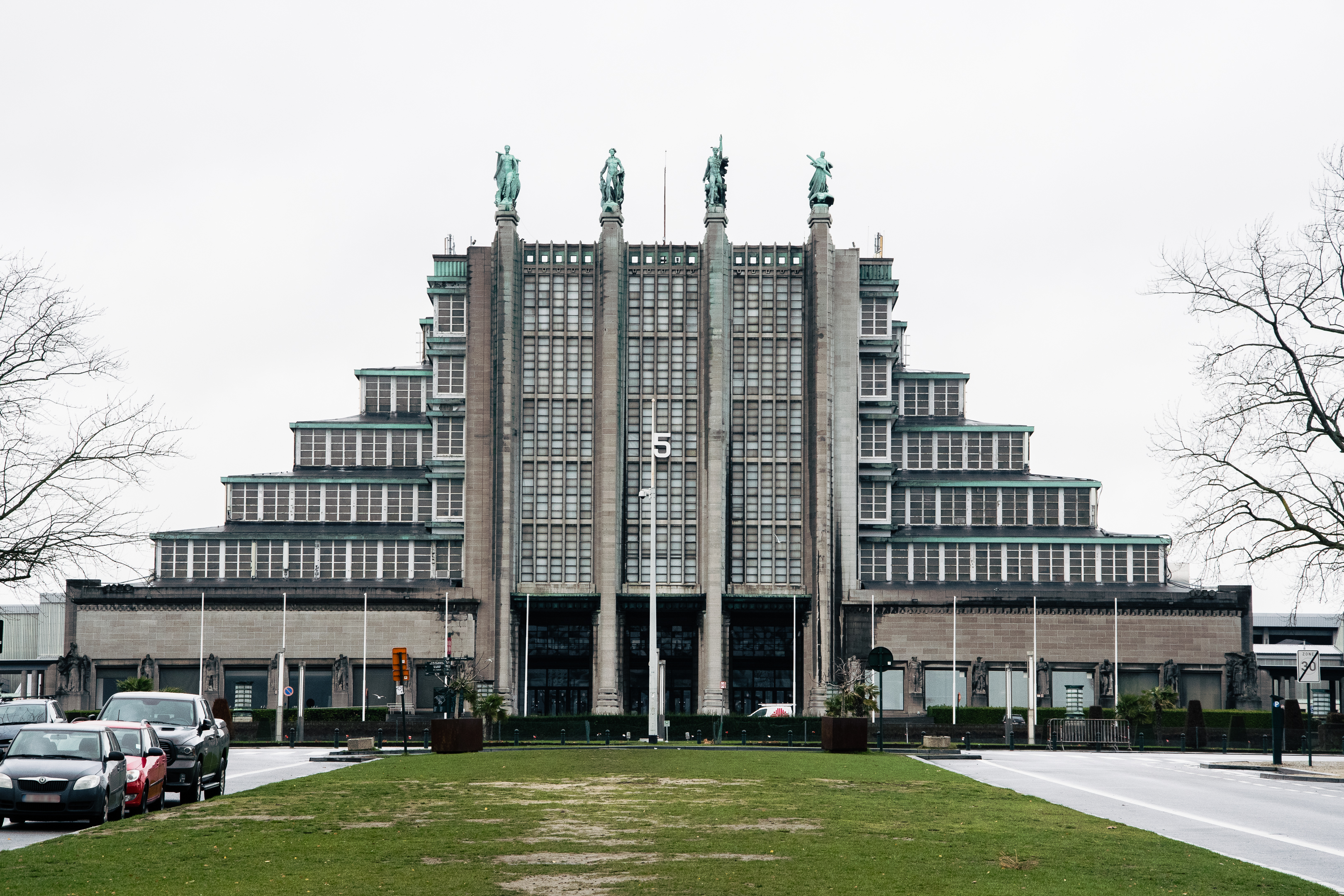
Centenary Palace (Palais 5/Paleis 5)

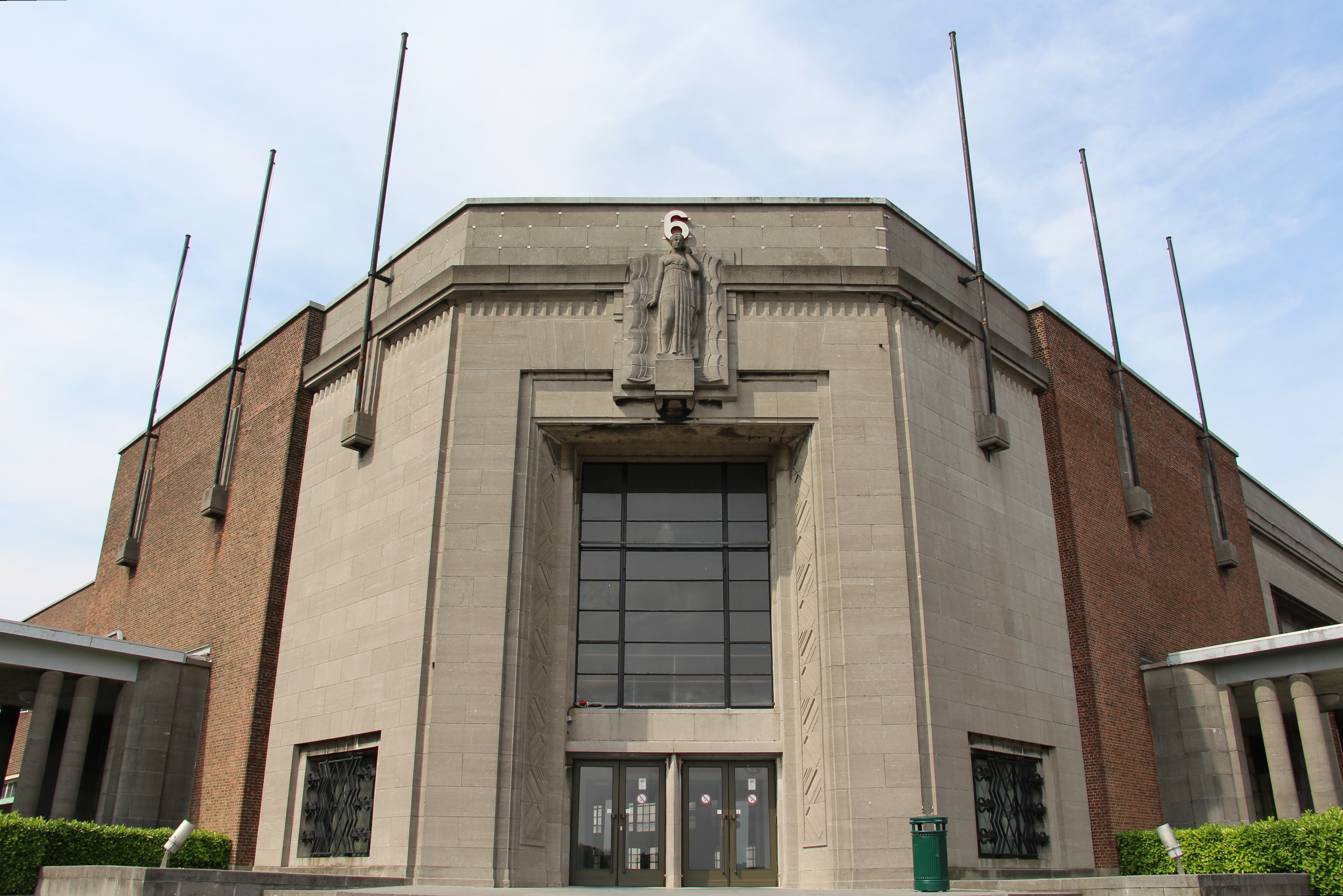
Palais 6/Paleis 6

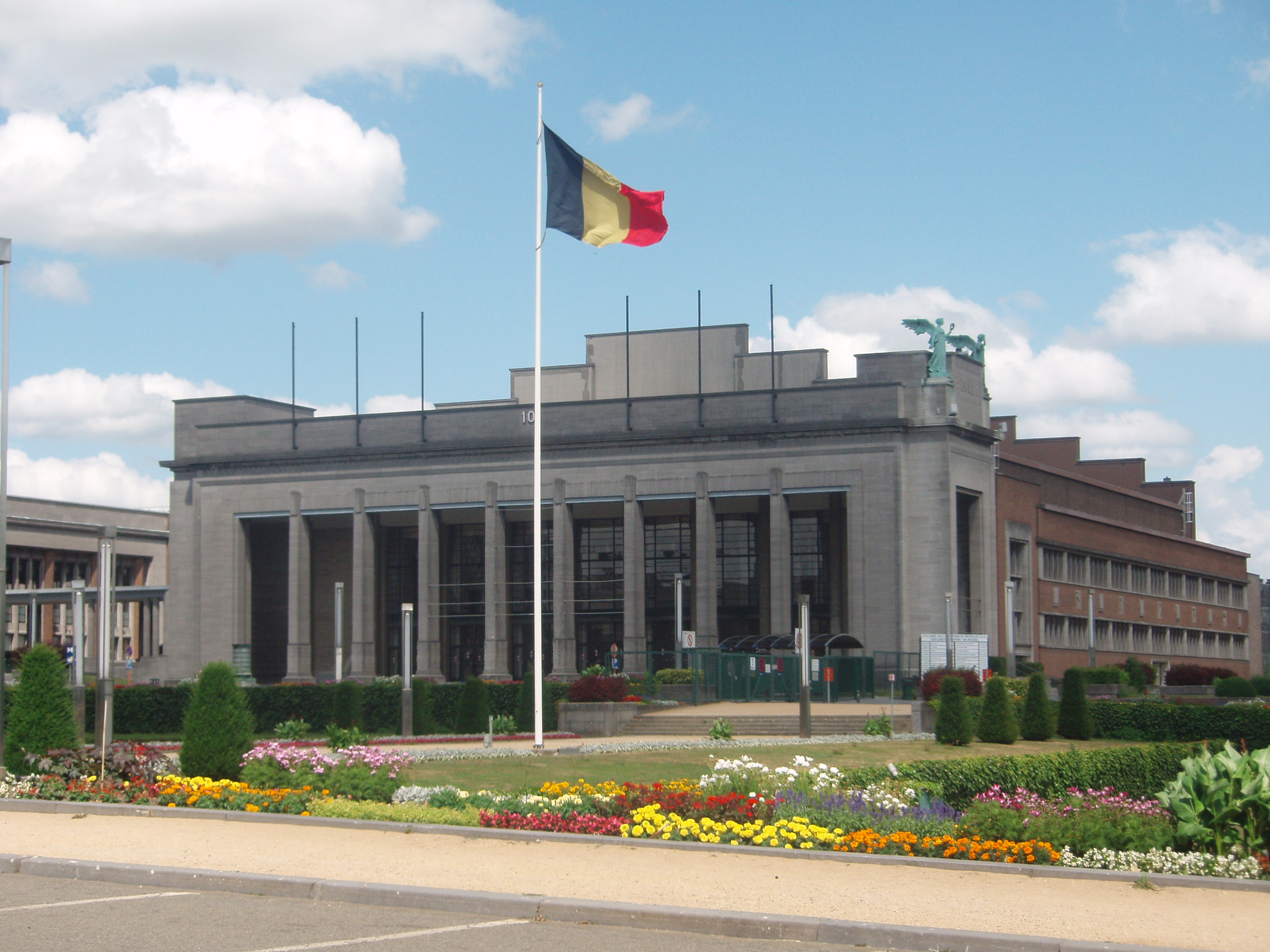
Palais 10/Paleis 10

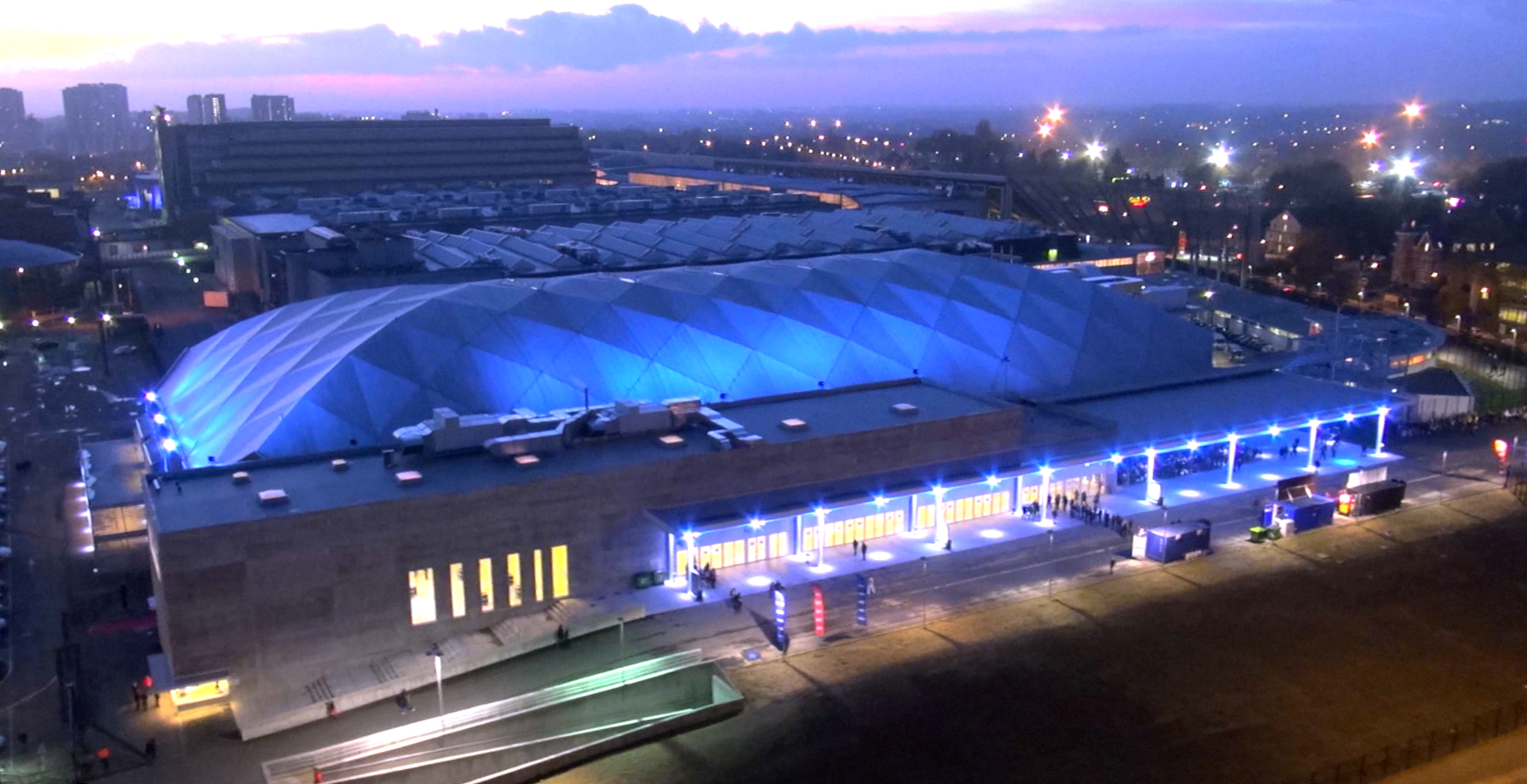
ING Arena (former Palais 12/Paleis 12)

== See also ==
- Design Museum Brussels
- Art Deco in Brussels
- History of Brussels
- Culture of Belgium

Preceded by Grieghallen; Bergen	Eurovision Song Contest; Venue; 1987	Succeeded by RDS Simmonscourt Pavilion; Dublin
