= Kinepolis Brussels =

Cinema complex in Brussels, Belgium

Coordinates: 50.8954°N 4.3374°E

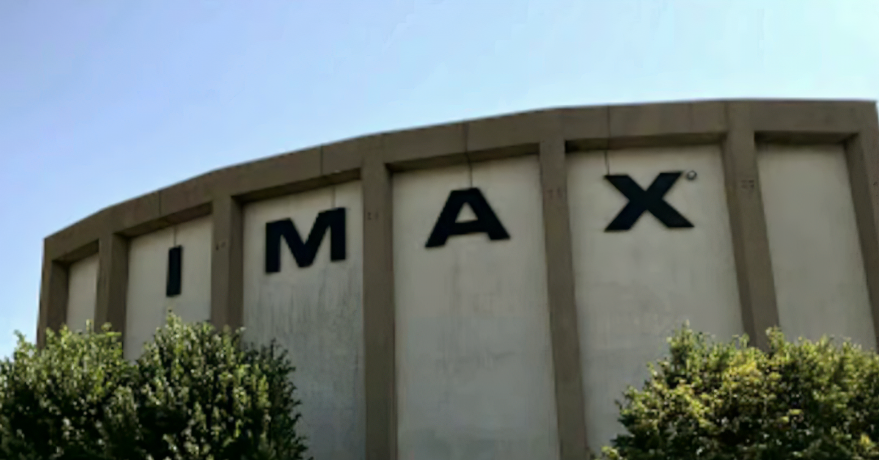
The IMAX theatre of Kinepolis Brussels from the outside

Kinepolis Brussels is a cinema complex on the Heysel/Heizel Plateau in Brussels, Belgium, owned by the Kinepolis Group.

== History ==
Albert Bert had had success with his 12 screen Decascoops cinema in Ghent, Belgium which had opened in 1981. He also owned a 5 screen cinema in Kortrijk, the Pentascoop. On 29 September 1988, Bert opened the Kinepolis in Brussels with 9 screens, including a 430-seat IMAX theatre. He had invested 500 million Belgian francs ($13 million) into the cinema. Bert finished adding screens when it reached 25 screens and 7,600 seats, and it was credited as being both the first and the then-largest cinema Megaplex in the world.

The IMAX screen closed at the end of 2005, due to a shortage of available content. On 16 November 2016, Kinepolis announced the reopening of the screen, removing the old 15/70 projector to make way for a new Barco dual-laser 4K IMAX projector equipped with IMAX's new 12.1 sound technology. At the time, the screen was the largest IMAX screen in Europe with a surface area of 532 m^{2} (5,730 sq ft). For the start of the movie The Odyssey in July 2026, the IMAX auditorium added an analog IMAX 70 mm projector (one of only six in Europe) on top of the dual-laser system. Although not the same as the original 15/70 projector, this unit weighs almost 2.5 tons and was assembled using several refurbished units because a complete, original set was no longer available.
