= Cesare Leonardi =

Italian architect (1935–2021)

- Born: 3 June 1935; Modena, Kingdom of Italy
- Died: 4 February 2021 (aged 85); Modena, Italy
- Occupation: Architect

Cesare Leonardi (3 June 1935 – 4 February 2021) was an Italian architect.

== Biography ==
Leonardi attended the University of Florence, where he was taught by Adalberto Libera, Ludovico Quaroni, and Leonardo Savioli. He graduated in 1970. From 1959 to 1960, he was an apprentice in the studio of Marcello D'Olivo in Udine before opening his own studio with Franca Stagi in 1963. Some of their works ended up in the Museum of Modern Art in New York City, the Victoria and Albert Museum in London, and Vitra Design Museum in Weil am Rhein. Photography allowed him to document, investigate, and plan his future blueprints for construction. He moved to the Viale Emilio Po studio in Modena in 1990, which now houses his complete archives. After 2000, he primarily devoted himself to photography, sculpture, and painting. In 2011, the Superintendent for Archival Heritage in Emilia-Romagna said that his archive was a "particularly important cultural asset".

Cesare Leonardi died in Modena on 4 February 2021, at the age of 85, from a long illness complicated by COVID-19.
