= Franca Stagi =

Italian architect and designer (1937–2008)

- Born: 1937; Modena, Kingdom of Italy
- Died: 2008 (aged 70–71); Modena, Italy
- Occupation: Architect
- Notable work: Dondolo chair

Franca Stagi (1937–2008) was an Italian architect and artist. With fellow designer Cesare Leonard, she operated a studio in Modena. Her most prominent design was the Dondolo chair. She focused on urban architecture and parks later in her career.

== Books ==
- Leonardi, Cesare (2019). The architecture of trees. Franca Stagi, Natalie Danford, Augusto Pirola, Giulio Orsini, Andrea Cavani, Cesare Translation of: Leonardi (1st ed.). Hudson, New York. ISBN 978-1-61689-806-9 OCLC 1039616223
