= Brussels International Exposition (1935) =

World's fair held in Brussels, Belgium

1935 Brussels
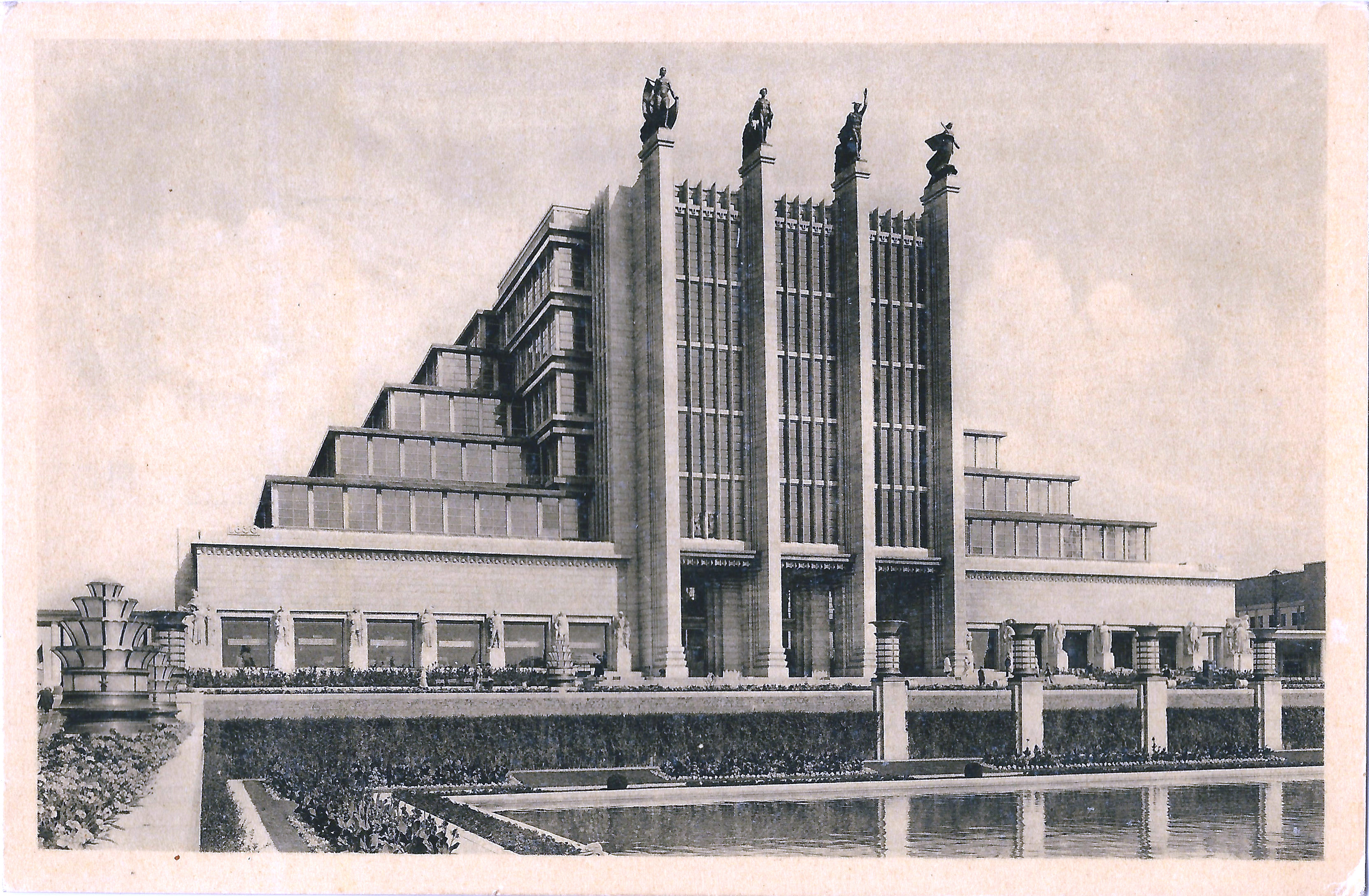
- The Palais des Expositions (or Grand Palais) during the 1935 Brussels World's Fair

Overview
- BIE-class: Universal exposition
- Category: First category General Exposition
- Name: Exposition universelle et internationale de Bruxelles
- Building(s): Palais des Expositions
- Area: 150 hectares (370 acres)
- Visitors: 20,000,000
- Organized by: Joseph van Neck

Participant(s)
- Countries: 24

Location
- Country: Belgium
- City: Brussels
- Venue: Heysel/Heizel Plateau
- Coordinates: 50°53′50″N 04°20′21″E

Timeline
- Opening: 27 April 1935
- Closure: 25 November 1935

Universal expositions
- Previous: Century of Progress in Chicago
- Next: Exposition Internationale des Arts et Techniques dans la Vie Moderne in Paris

Specialized Expositions
- Next: ILIS 1936 in Stockholm

The Brussels International Exposition (French: Exposition universelle et internationale de Bruxelles; Dutch: Wereldtentoonstelling van Brussel) of 1935 was a world's fair held between 27 April and 6 November 1935 on the Heysel/Heizel Plateau in Brussels, Belgium.

== History ==
The 1935 World's Fair was the tenth world's fair hosted by Belgium, and the fourth in Brussels, following the fairs in 1888, 1897 and 1910. Officially sanctioned by the Bureau International des Expositions (BIE), twenty-five countries officially participated and a further five were unofficially represented. The theme was colonisation, on the 50th anniversary of the establishment of the Congo Free State.

The exhibition attracted some twenty million visitors. The Belgian architect Joseph van Neck was the principal architect of the fair and of the Art Deco Palais des Expositions (also known as the Grand Palais), with its interior concrete parabolic arches, and four heroic bronze statues on piers.

Among many other contributors, Le Corbusier designed part of the French exhibit; the Belgian modernist architect Victor Bourgeois designed the Palais des Expositions, the Leopold II restaurant and the Soprocol pavilion. The Belgian art exposition prominently displayed the work of contemporary Belgian artists, including Paul Delvaux, René Magritte and Louis Van Lint, boosting their careers.

The exhibition was photographed in colour by the Dutch photographer Bernard F. Eilers, which was a novelty in 1935.

The Palais des Expositions, and at least three other of the 1935 structures, were re-used for the 1958 Brussels World's Fair (Expo 58), which was held on the same site in 1958. Currently, it is home to the Brussels Exhibition Centre (Brussels Expo), the city's most important event complex in Belgium and the largest exhibition space in the Benelux.

== Gallery ==
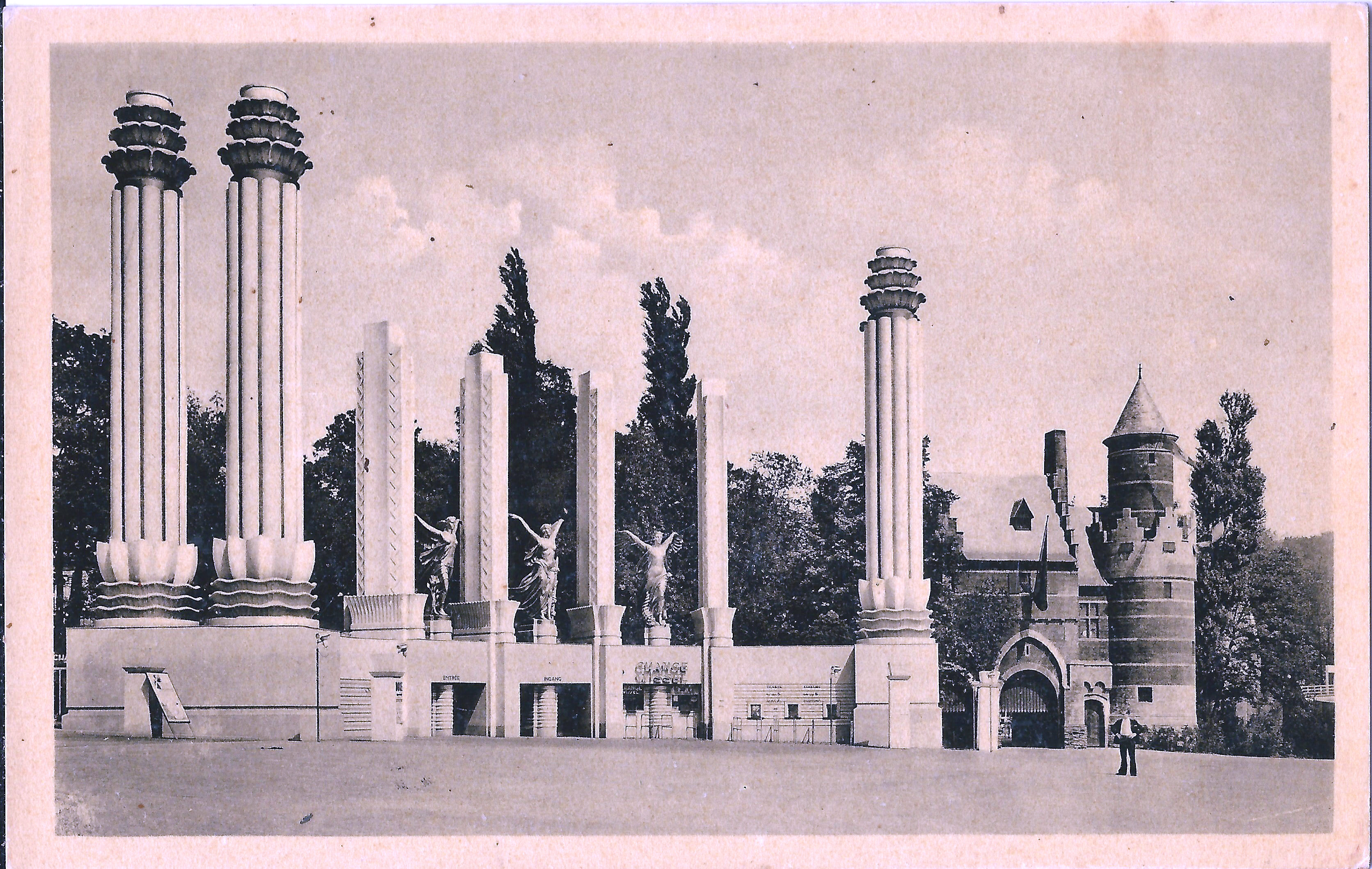
The main entrance

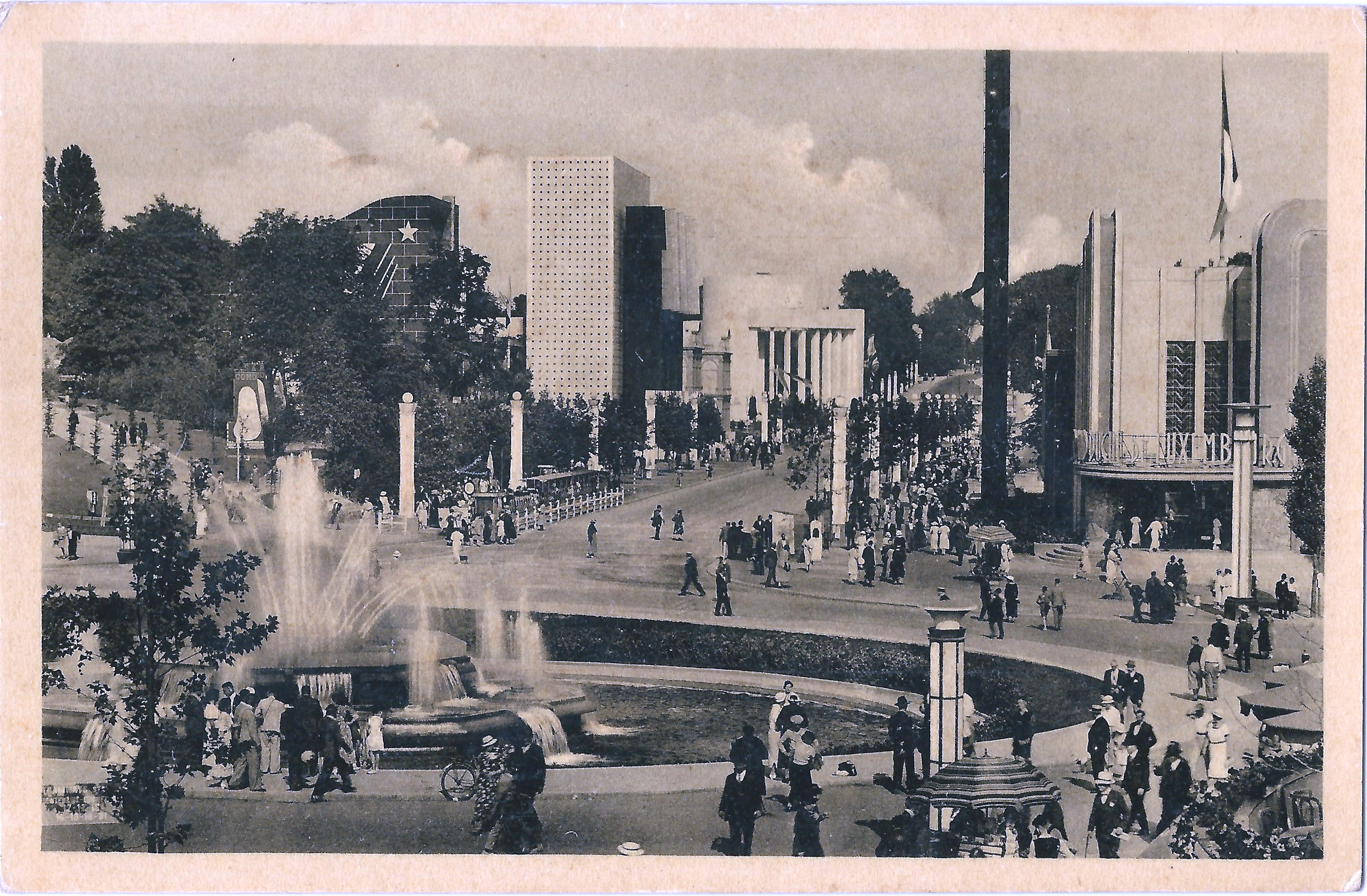
General view

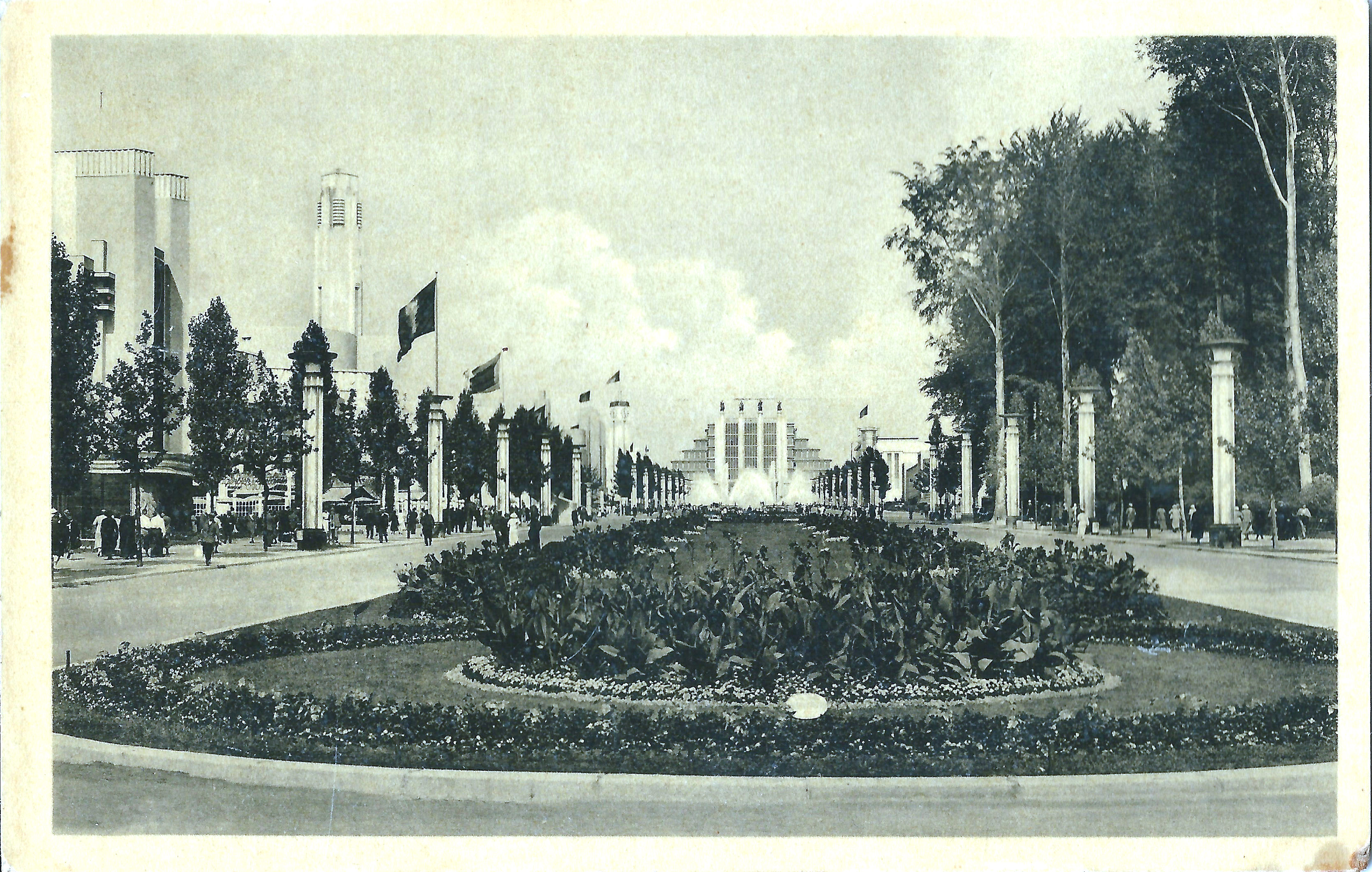
View towards the Palais des Expositions

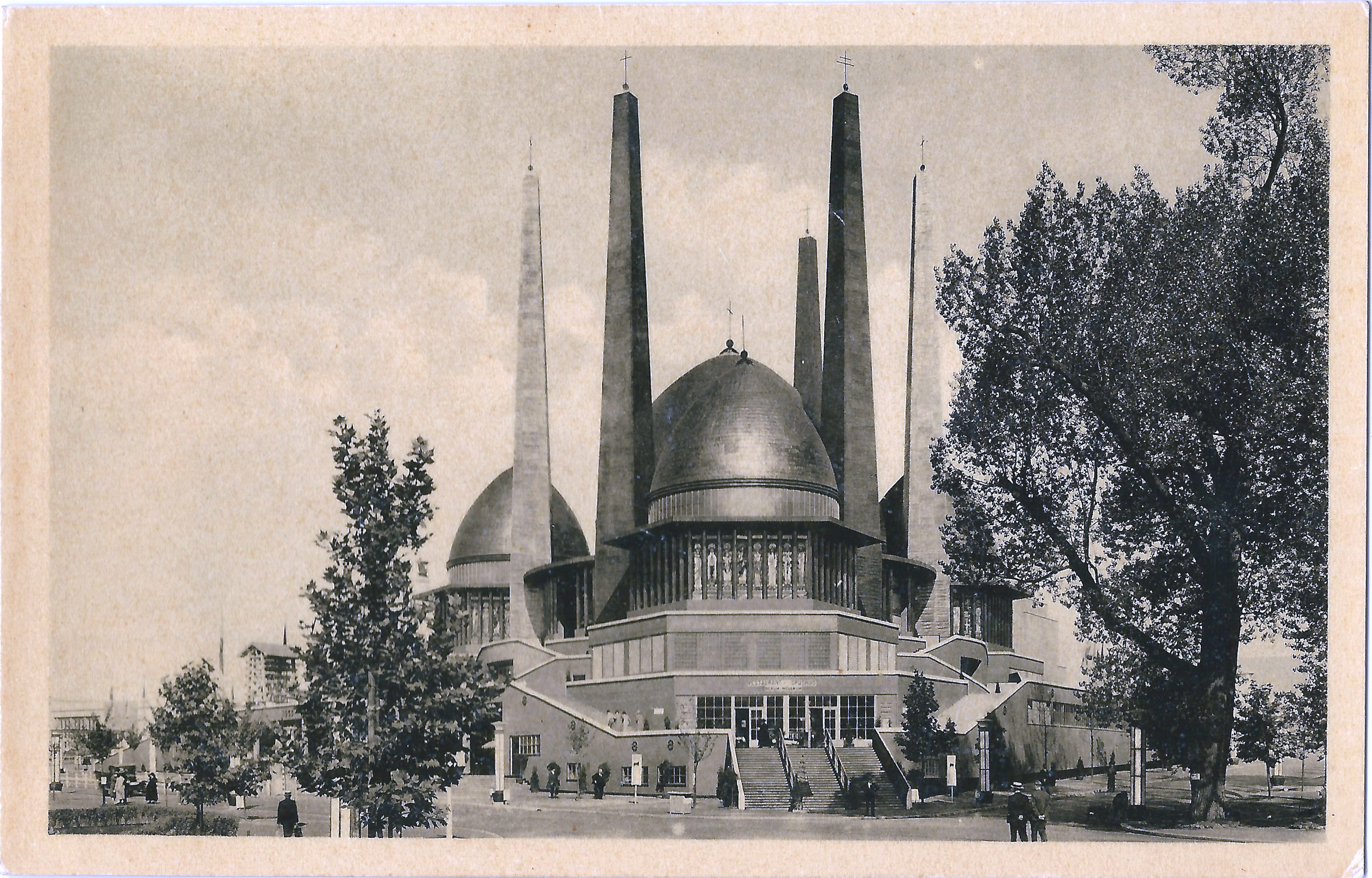
The Catholic life pavilion

== See also ==
- Leo Marfurt, who designed the poster for the exhibition
- Brussels Expo
