= Fruition =

Fruition may refer to:

- Fruition (digital marketing agency), a Denver-based digital marketing agency
- Fruition (fashion company), a Las Vegas fashion retail and design archive corporation
