= Kim Hastreiter =

American journalist and editor (born 1951)

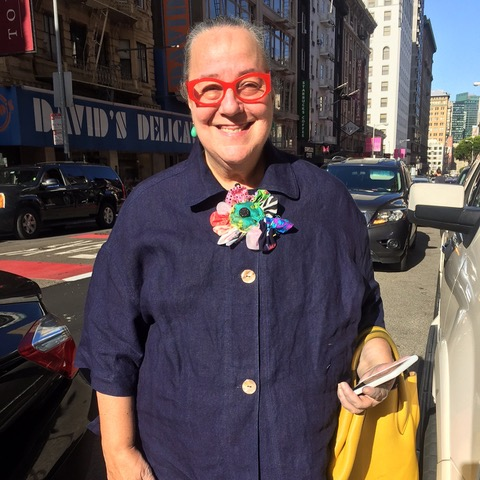
- Hastreiter, 2010
- Born: Kim Hastreiter; November 12, 1951 (age 74); West Orange, New Jersey, U.S.
- Education: Washington University in St. Louis; NSCAD University (BFA); California Institute of the Arts (MFA)
- Occupations: Journalist; editor; publisher; curator
- Years active: 1984–2017 (Paper magazine)
- Known for: Co-founder of Paper magazine
- Awards: Marylou Luther Award (2010); CFDA Eugenia Shepard Award (2010); Pratt Institute Legend Award (2014)

Kim Hastreiter (born November 12, 1951) is an American journalist, editor, publisher, and curator who co-founded Paper magazine. She served as co-editor-in-chief from its inception until 2017, when she and partner David Hershkovits sold the company. For 32 years she wrote a column, "Note From Kim", on cultural movements and trends. She resides in Greenwich Village, New York City.

== Early life ==
Hastreiter was born to Gloria and Walter Hastreiter in West Orange, New Jersey. She has one sibling, Laurie. After high school she attended Washington University in St. Louis for two years and then went to Nova Scotia School of Art and Design, where she received her BFA. She then pursued an MFA from California Institute of the Arts in Valencia, CA, where she was mentored by conceptual artist John Baldessari. In 1976, Hastreiter decided to drive cross-country to New York, with performer Joey Arias, to become a conceptual artist. While working as a salesgirl in a Madison Avenue fashion boutique, she befriended photographer Bill Cunningham who helped her get her first editorial job at the SoHo Weekly News.

== Career ==
At the SoHo Weekly News, Hastreiter served as the Style Editor, where she worked on fashion stories collaborating with artists like Robert Mapplethorpe, Keith Haring, and Kenny Scharf, among others. While working there, she met journalist David Hershkovits, who became her business partner after the SoHo Weekly News closed suddenly. Together they founded Paper magazine in 1984, in the kitchen of her Tribeca loft.

Through her work at Paper, Hastreiter became known for her creative collaborations with artists, designers, illustrators, and photographers. She was also behind several collaborations between creatives, connecting artists and designers such as Keith Haring and Vivienne Westwood for a collection together in the early 80s. She connected Target to designers through a spread in the May 2002 issue of Paper, wherein she asked the following creatives to envision products that both had artful design and utilitarian functionality: Isaac Mizrahi, Isabel Toledo, Ruben Toledo, Toland Grinell, Stefan Sagmeister, Kate Spade, Andy Spade, Maira Kalman, Vladimir Kagan, Geoffrey Beene, Betsey Johnson, Bridget de Socio, Manolo Blahnik, Ingo Maurer, and Tucker Viemeister.

In 2017, Hastreiter and Hershkovits sold their stake in Paper to Tom Florio, former chief executive of Advanstar Fashion Group, and Drew Elliot, the chief creative officer of Paper. In December 2017, she launched her consultation firm, Kim Hastreiter OG, LLC. In addition, she now serves as an editor at the Barcelona-based design magazine, Apartamento.

=== Curatorial projects ===
In the 90s, Hastreiter annually curated three-day 24-hour pop-up art stores in Los Angeles that she called "cultural department stores." In 2006, Hastreiter and Jeffrey Deitch conceptualized the first of what would become several iterations of the 24-hour pop-ups for Art Basel Miami. In Hastreiter's words, "The store is an art piece on the manic nature of consumerism. No matter what's happening, you've got to keep it pure to keep it good." The store sold creative collaborations as a political statement about the blurred lines between art and commerce, and included items from names such as John Waters and Jeff Koons. Hastreiter recalls, "We had Eli Broad waiting in line just to get in. By the end, the place looked like it had been stripped by termites." After a successful run in Miami, Hastreiter decided to bring the project, which she dubbed the Super Duper Market, to Los Angeles just one year later, and continued to do so for two more years. The Super Duper Market played with the concept of clashing high- and low-fashion, showcasing quality goods, from couture to streetwear. In 2008, for the fourth Super Duper Market, Hastreiter celebrated the new cultural edge of young, independent food producers around America. Some featured creatives included Rodarte, Fruition, and Undefeated. Music at the event was handled by 17 different local Los Angeles acts, including Charles Lester, Harper Simon, Lady Tigra, and Black Black.

== Published works ==
Hastreiter has co-authored two books on style and culture with David Hershkovits, From Abfab to Zen: Paper's Guide to Pop Culture and 20 Years of Style: The World According to Paper. In 2007, she wrote a book about industrial designer, Ingo Maurer, called Provoking Magic: Lighting of Ingo Maurer, in collaboration with the Cooper-Hewitt, Smithsonian Design Museum. In 2008, she wrote a book on the life and work of late fashion designer, Geoffrey Beene, titled Geoffrey Beene: An American Fashion Rebel. In 2015, she edited a book called @heaven, which was about death in the digital era. In 2019, Hastreiter edited and wrote the foreword for a set of four books on the work of Paige Powell, published by Dashwood Books in collaboration with Gucci. Hastreiter also wrote the foreword for Target: 20 Years of Design for All, published by Rizzoli.

== Awards and distinctions ==
Hastreiter has received the Marylou Luther Award at the Accessories Council Excellence Awards (2010), the Council of Fashion Designers of America Eugenia Shepard Award (2010), and Pratt Institute's Legend Award (2014).

Hastreiter has been interviewed for three documentaries: Bill Cunningham: New York (2010), Arias with a Twist (2010), and The Universe of Keith Haring (2008). She also appeared in one episode of Keeping Up with the Kardashians (season 10, episode 7) in 2015.
