= André Waterkeyn =

Belgian engineer

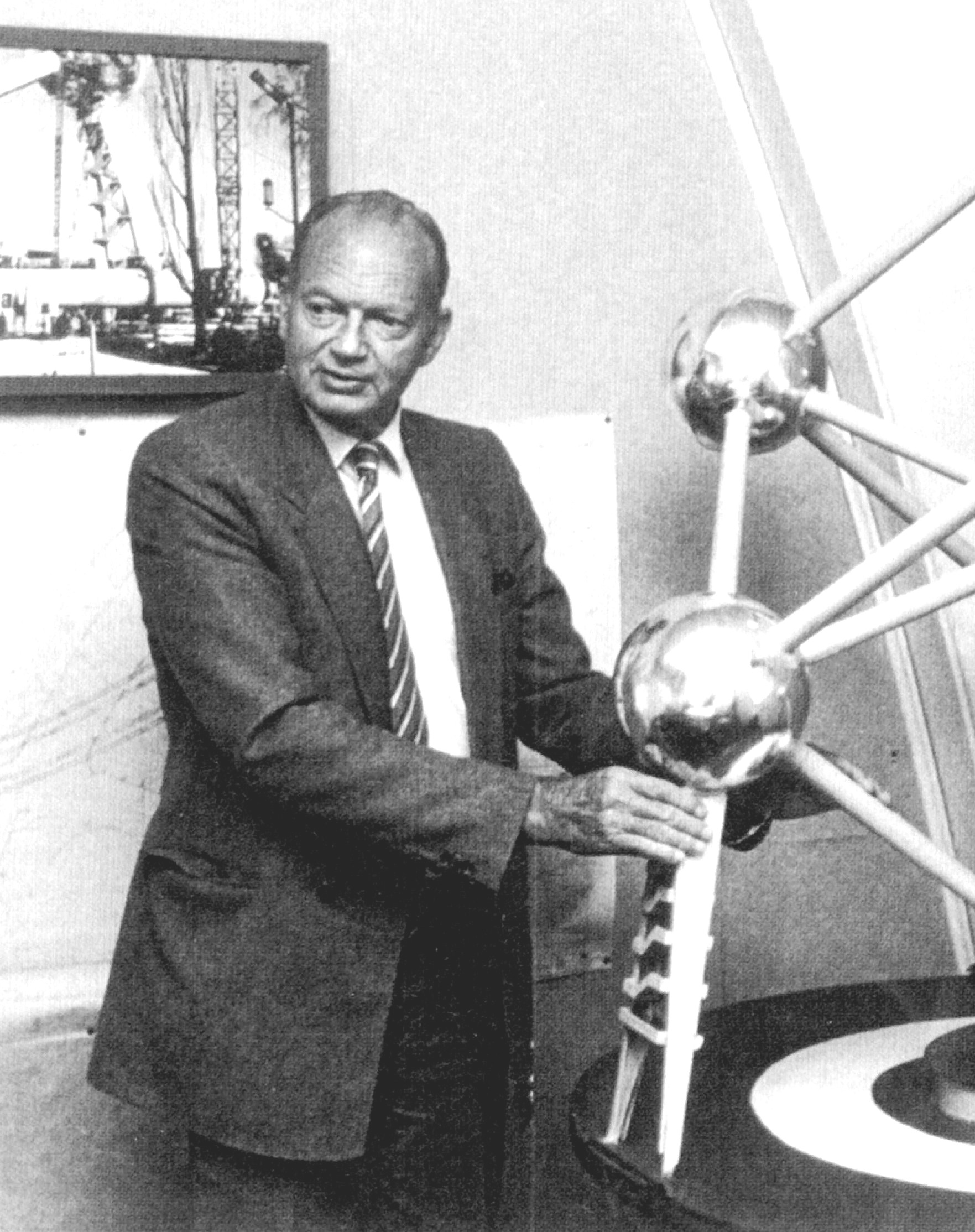
Portrait of civil engineer André Waterkeyn, creator of the Atomium in Brussels, in front of a model of his creation (in 1962).

André Waterkeyn (23 August 1917 – 4 October 2005) was a Belgian engineer, born in Wimbledon, London, best known for creating the Atomium.

Waterkeyn was the economic director of Fabrimetal (now Agoria), a federation of metallurgical companies when in 1954 he was asked to design a building for the 1958 Brussels World's Fair (Expo 58) that would symbolise Belgian engineering skills.

Waterkeyn owned the copyrights of all reproductions of the Atomium until he passed it over to the organisation owning the original building around the year 2000. He was chairman of the board of the Atomium until 2002, when his son took over. He died in Brussels in 2005. After his death, the top sphere was named after him.

Waterkeyn was also a field hockey player. At the 1948 London Olympics he participated with the Belgian team in the 1948 hockey tournament, playing the position of forward.
