= Atomium =

Landmark building in Brussels, Belgium

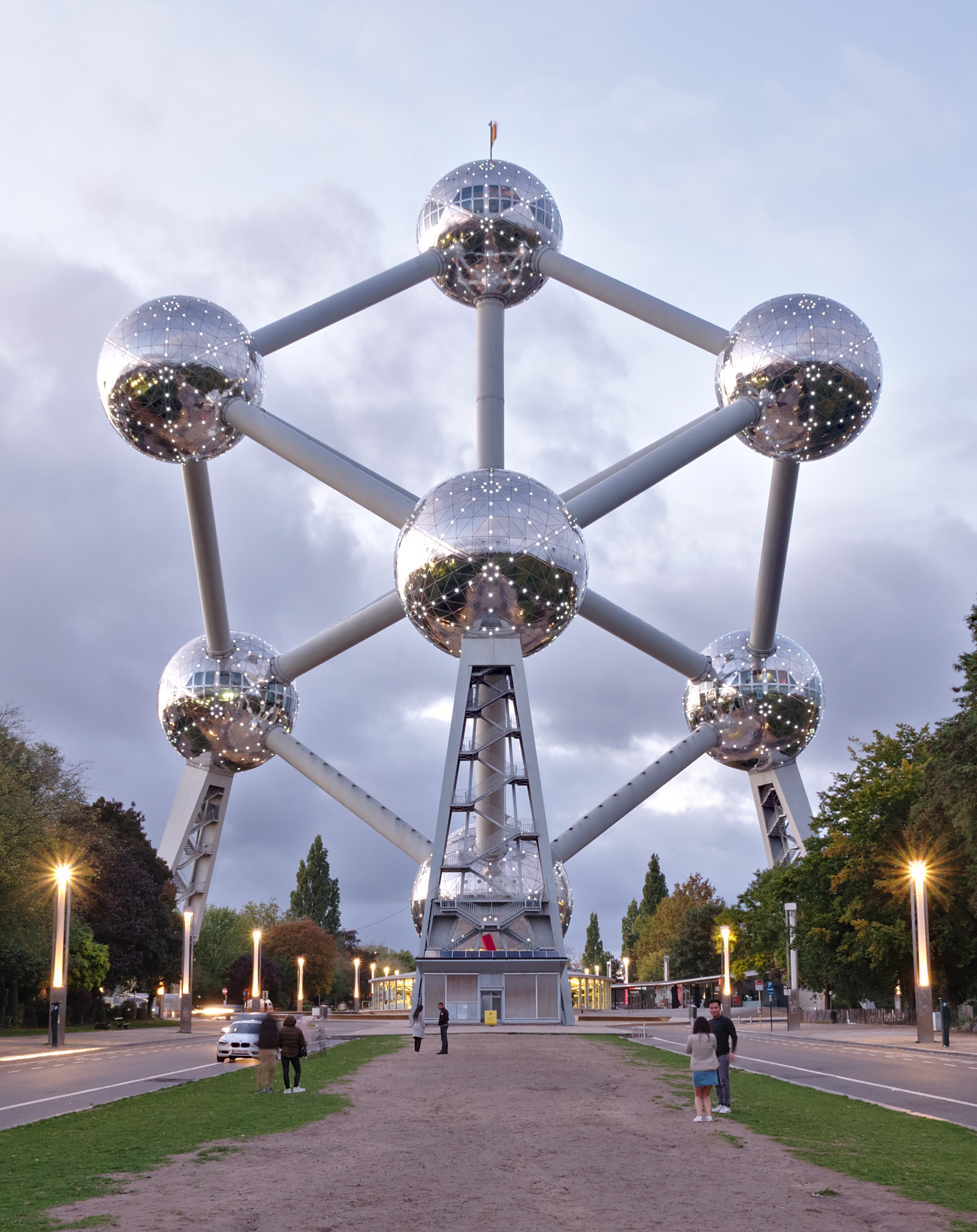
- General view of the Atomium
- Interactive map of the Atomium area

General information
- Status: Open
- Architectural style: Modernism
- Location: Square de l'Atomium / Atomiumsquare 1, 1020 Laeken, City of Brussels, Brussels-Capital Region, Belgium
- Coordinates: 50°53′41″N 4°20′28″E
- Construction started: 1956
- Completed: 1958
- Renovated: 2004–2006

Height
- Antenna spire: 102 m (335 ft)

Design and construction
- Architect: André and Jean Polak
- Engineer: André Waterkeyn

Renovating team
- Renovating firm: Jacques Delens and BESIX

Other information
- Public transit: 6 Heysel/Heizel

Website
- atomium.be

The Atomium (/əˈtoʊmiəm/ ə-TOH-mee-əm, French: [atɔmjɔm], Dutch: [aːˈtoːmijəm]) is a landmark modernist building in Brussels, Belgium, originally constructed as the centrepiece of the 1958 Brussels World's Fair (Expo 58). Designed by the engineer André Waterkeyn and the architects André and Jean Polak as a tribute to scientific progress, as well as to symbolise Belgian engineering skills at the time, it is located on the Heysel/Heizel Plateau in Laeken (northern part of the City of Brussels), where the exhibition took place. It is the city's most popular tourist attraction, and serves as a museum, an art centre and a cultural destination.

The Atomium stands 102 metres (335 ft) tall, making it one of the tallest structures in Belgium. Its nine 18-metre-diameter (59 ft), stainless-steel-clad spheres are connected in the shape of a unit cell (Note: Specifically, a body-centred cubic (BCC) structure.) that could represent an iron (ferrite) crystal magnified 165 billion times. Steel tubes connecting the spheres enclose stairs, escalators and a lift (Note: The latter is located in the central, vertical tube.) to allow access to the six visitable spheres, which contain exhibit halls and other public spaces. The top sphere includes a restaurant with a panoramic view of Brussels. The building was completely renovated between 2004 and 2006 by the companies Jacques Delens and BESIX.

The building is located on the Square de l'Atomium/Atomiumsquare, at the intersection of the Boulevard du Centenaire/Eeuwfeestlaan with the Avenue de l'Atomium/Atomiumlaan and the Avenue de Bouchout/Boechoutlaan, and opposite the Centenary Palace of the Brussels Exhibition Centre (Brussels Expo).

== Naming ==
The name Atomium (pronounced /əˈtoʊmiːəm/ ə-TOH-mee-əm) is a portmanteau combining the words atom and aluminium, the metal with which the spheres were initially covered. The Brussels-Capital Region is bilingual; hence, both the monument's French and Dutch names—l'Atomium and het Atomium—are official. In French, l'Atomium (pronounced [atɔmjɔm]) is used both in the masculine and in the feminine, even if the monument's official team prefers the feminine. In Dutch, het Atomium (pronounced [aːˈtoːmijəm]) is neuter. In English, it is usually referred to with the definite article 'the' in front: the Atomium.

== History ==
=== Inception and construction ===
The Atomium was built as the main pavilion and symbol of the 1958 Brussels World's Fair (Expo 58). Its nine 18-metre (59 ft) spheres depict nine iron atoms in a body-centred cubic (BCC) unit cell, which could, for example, represent an α-iron (ferrite) crystal, magnified 165 billion times. In the 1950s, faith in scientific progress was strong, and the subject was chosen to embody the enthusiasm of the Atomic Age. Designed to highlight humanity's advances—particularly in nuclear physics—it reflected Belgium's active role in the field ever since uranium from the Belgian Congo became the dominant material for nuclear fission, including the fuel used in the world's first nuclear weapons. With the Atomium, the country thus sought to promote the post-war ideal of peacefully applying atomic research and technology to improve lives and benefit mankind.

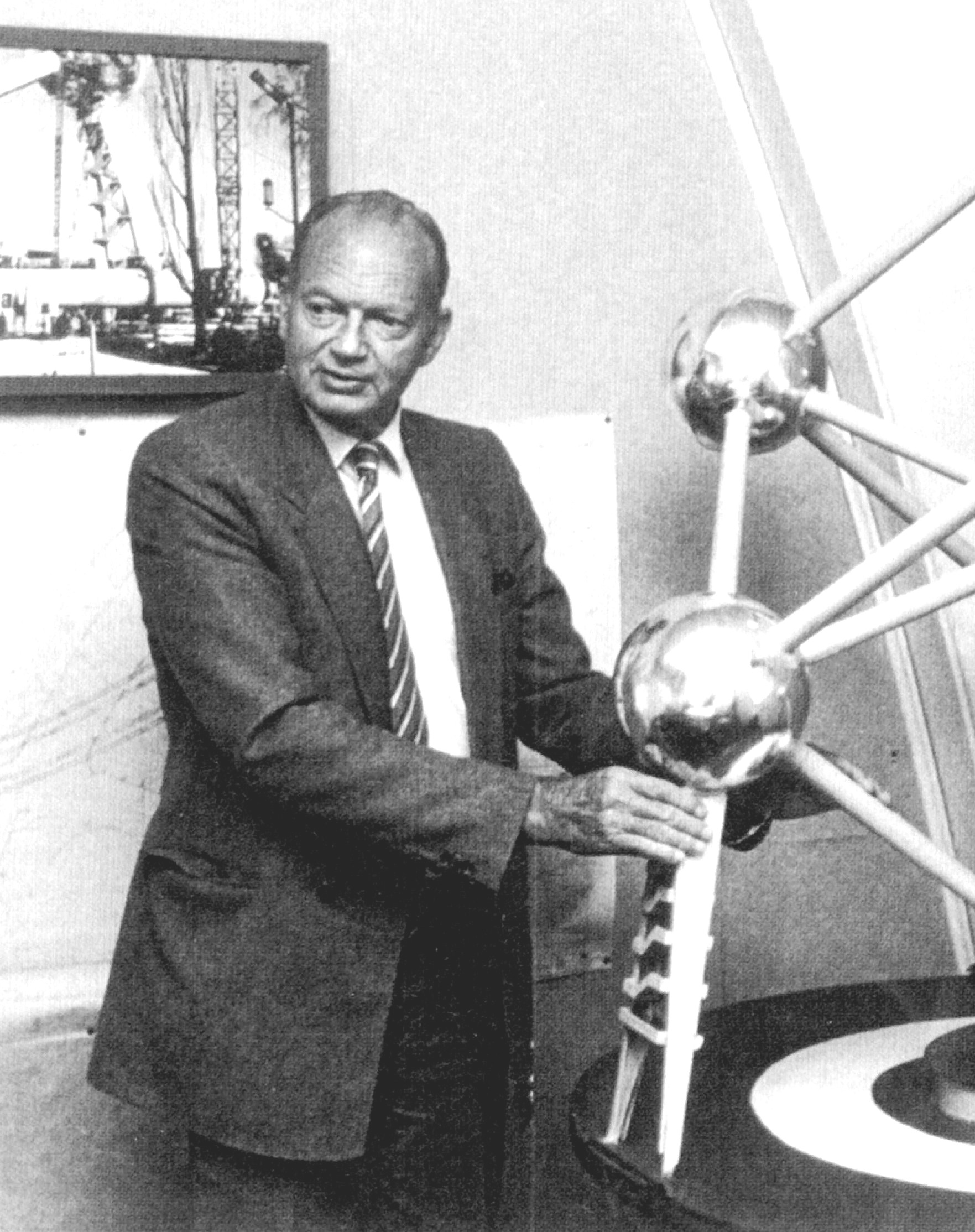
André Waterkeyn, the Atomium's engineer, in front of a model of his creation

The construction of the Atomium was a technical feat. In January 1955, a first project was presented by the engineer André Waterkeyn, director of the economic department at Fabrimétal, the Federation of Companies in the Metal Fabricating Industry (now known as Agoria). The architects André and Jean Polak were responsible for the concept's architectural transposition, drawing up numerous sketches in the process. The company received assistance from the consulting engineers Artémy S. Joukoff and André Beckers, who were supported by the V. Daniel design office. Construction of the foundations began in March 1956 and the building, erected by the Jambes-Namur Construction Workshops, was completed less than a month before the inauguration of Expo 58, on 17 April 1958.

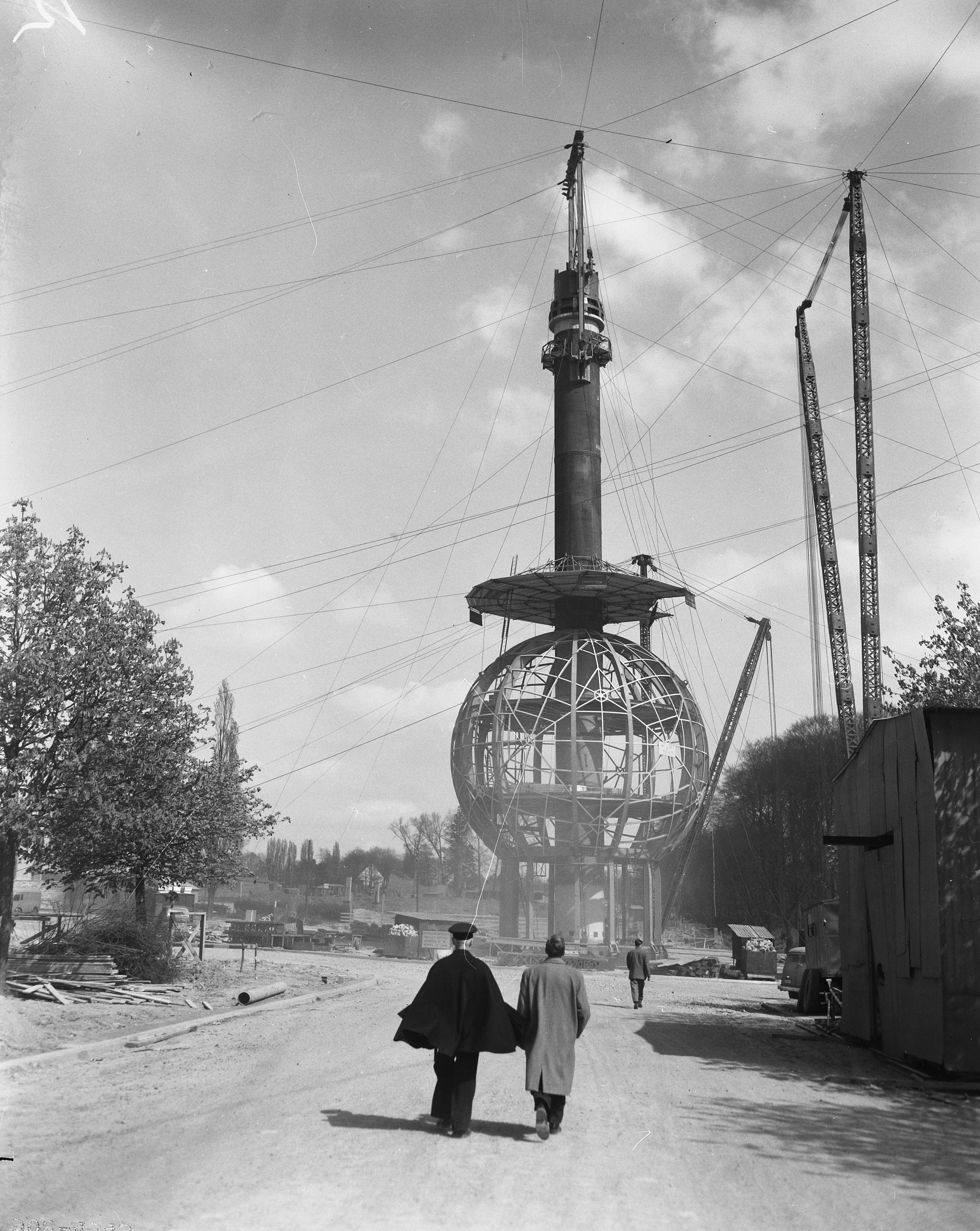
Start of the erection of the frame (11 April 1957)

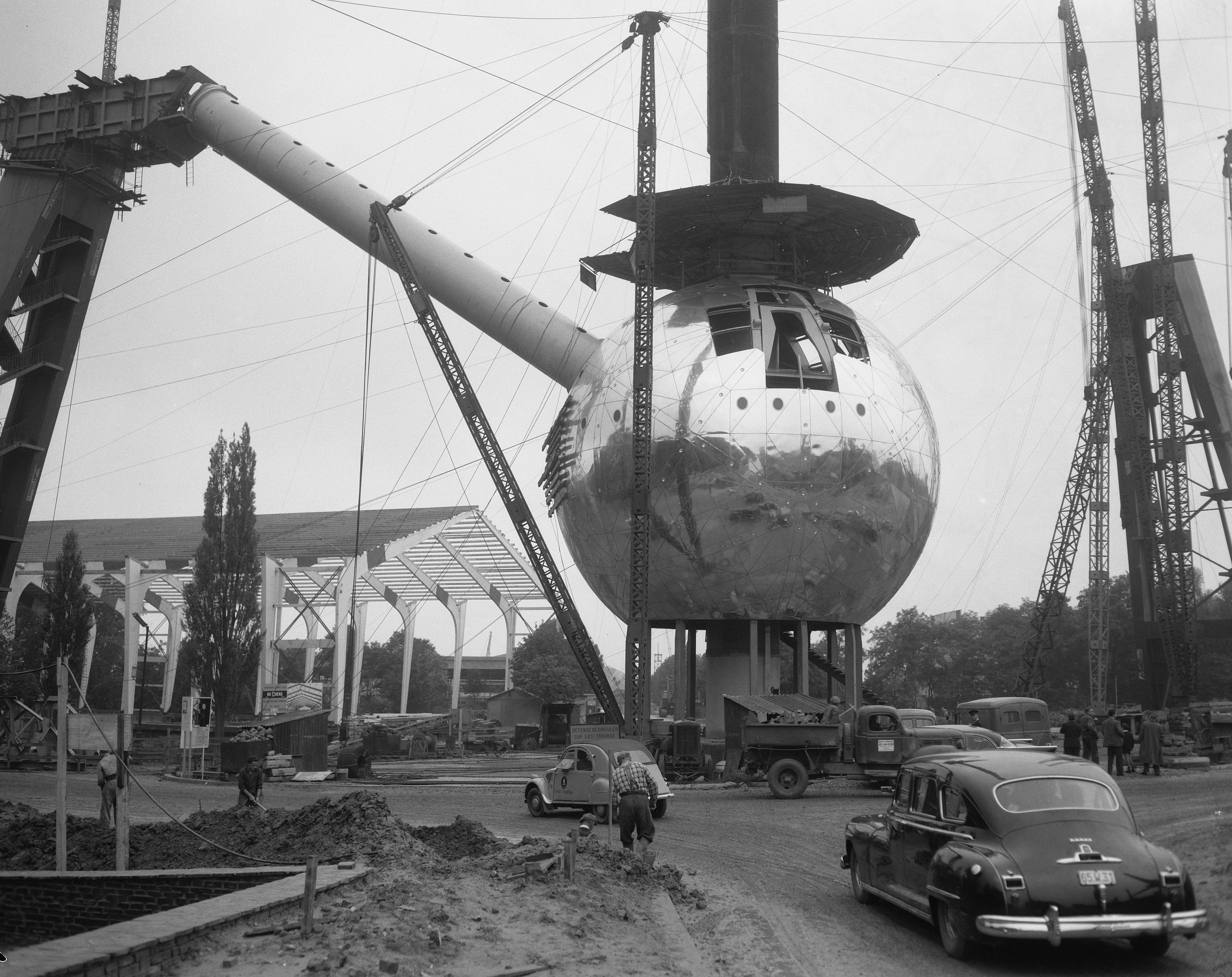
Construction of the supports, first tube and sphere (21 August 1957)

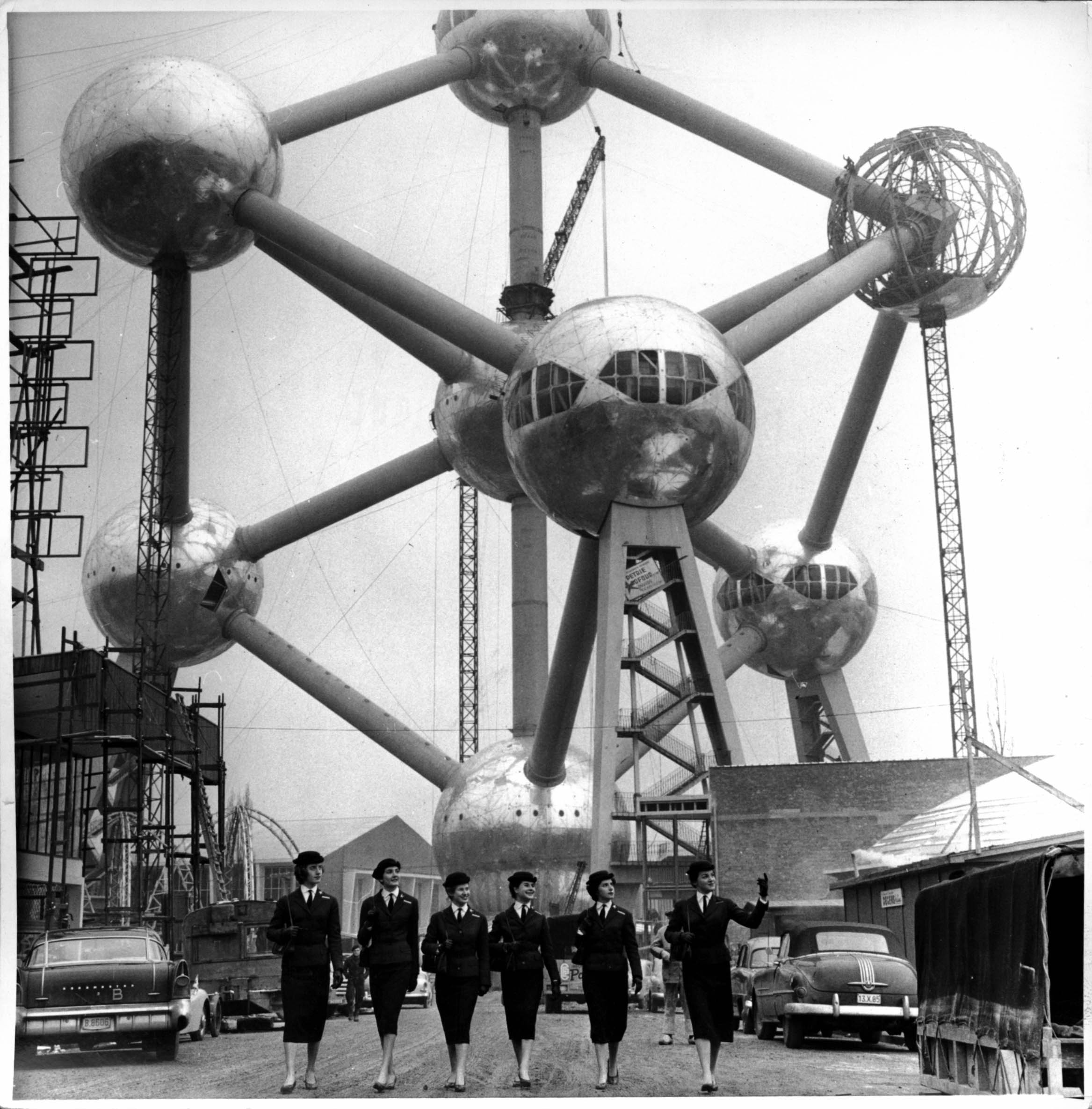
Completion of the upper spheres (early 1958)

=== Expo 58 and posterity ===
The Atomium and gondola lift during the 1958 Brussels World's Fair (Expo 58)

Since opening, only six of the nine spheres have been accessible to the public: the three on the central axis and the three on the lower outer edges. Each sphere has two main floors and an additional lower floor reserved for service. Tubes with a diameter of 3 metres (10 ft) connect the spheres along the cube's twelve edges and all eight vertices to the centre. The central tube contains Europe's fastest lift at the time of construction, with a speed of 5 m/s (20 ft/s), installed by the Belgian branch of the Swiss firm Schlieren (subsequently taken over by Schindler). It allows 22 people to reach the summit in just 23 seconds. The escalators installed in the oblique tubes are also among the longest in Europe, with the longest measuring 35 metres (100 ft).

The three upper outer spheres lack vertical support and are therefore not open to the public for safety reasons (to minimise foot traffic in the spheres). The original design called for no leg supports on the three lower outer spheres; the structure was simply to rest on the singular mid-bottom sphere. However, wind-tunnel tests proved that such a structure would have toppled in an 80 km/h (50 mph) wind, whilst winds of up to 140 km/h (90 mph) have been recorded in Belgium. Support columns were thus added under the three spheres in question to provide sufficient resistance against overturning.

The Atomium, designed to last six months, was not intended to survive the 1958 World's Fair, but its popularity and success made it a major element of Brussels' landscape. Its destruction was therefore postponed year after year, until the city's authorities decided to keep it. However, for thirty years, little maintenance work was done. Still, the building continued to serve as the backdrop for major events and competitions. In 1960, the 47th Tour de France passed in front of it during its inaugural stages. From 1960 to 1962, the Brussels Motor Grand Prix automobile race was also organised nearby.

=== Renovation (2004–2006) ===
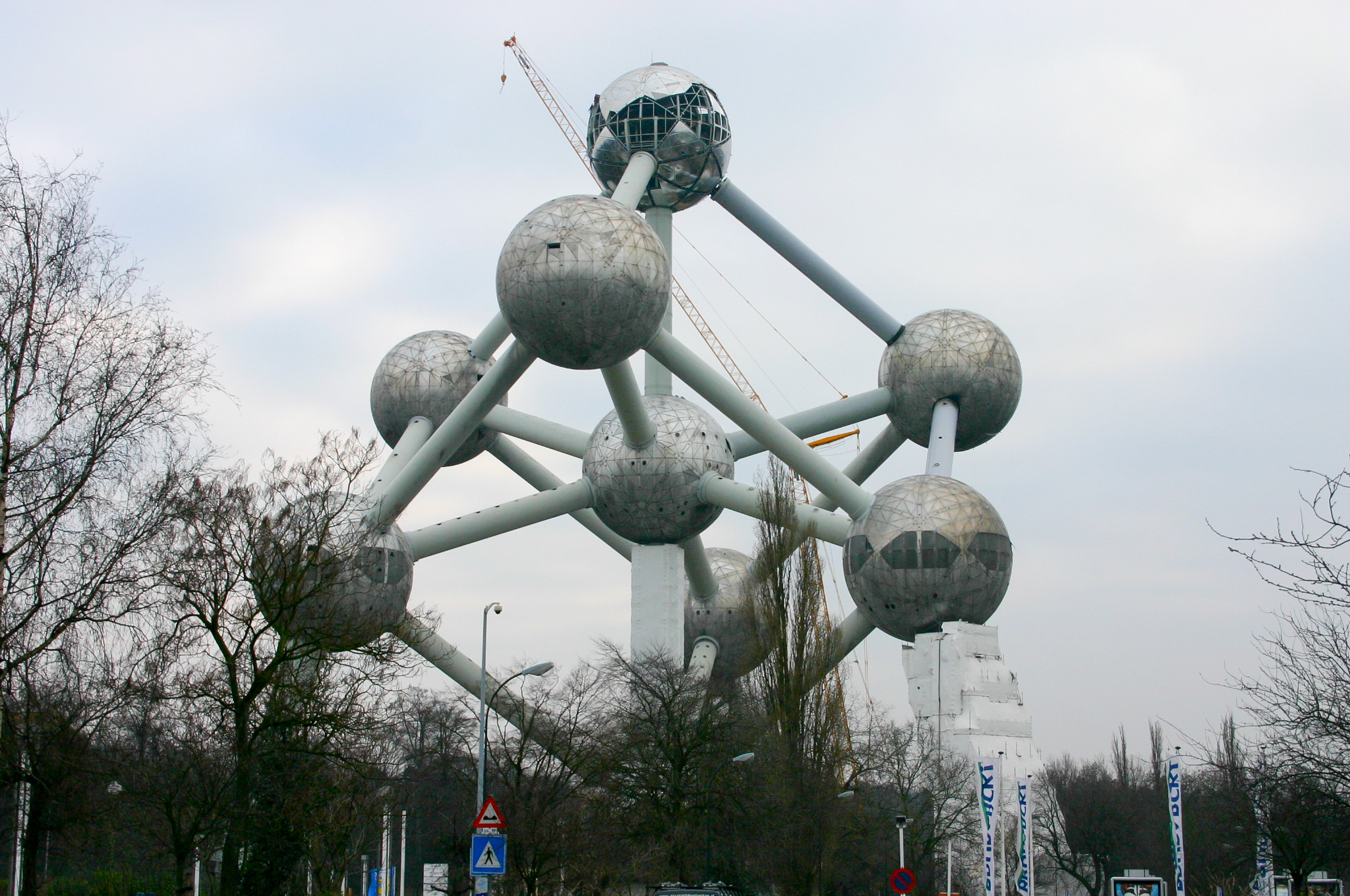
Start of the 2004–2006 renovation. The faded aluminium sheets were replaced by stainless steel ones.

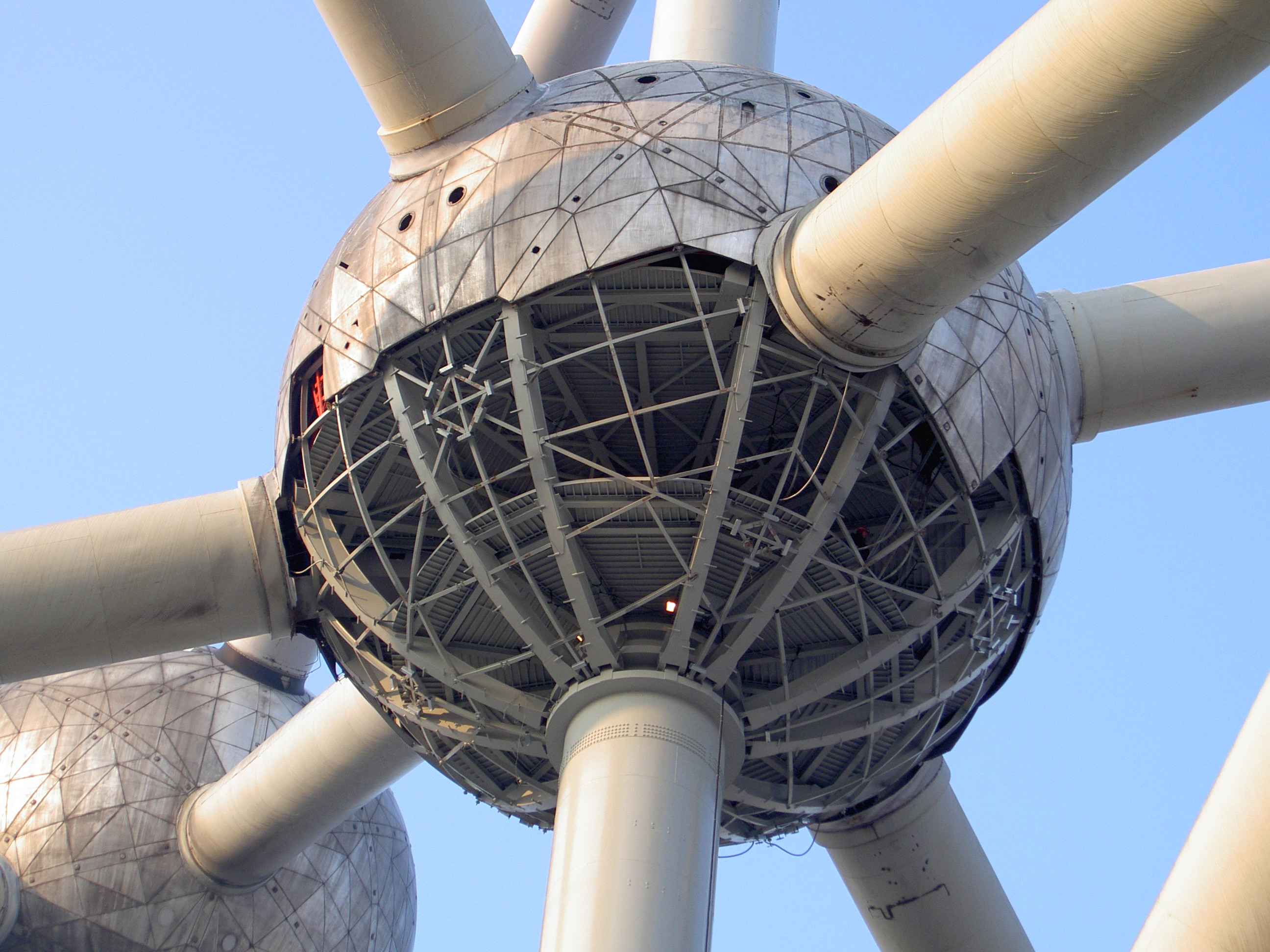
Closeup of the central sphere during the renovation, revealing the interior structure

By the turn of the millennium, the state of the building had deteriorated and a comprehensive renovation was sorely needed. Renovation work, carried out by Belgian construction companies Jacques Delens and BESIX, began in March 2004. The Atomium was closed to the public in October of that year, and remained closed until 18 February 2006. Although the Atomium depicts an iron unit cell, the spheres were originally clad in aluminium. The renovation included replacing these faded aluminium sheets with stainless steel, which is primarily iron, and building a new reception pavilion with a boomerang-shaped roof. At the foot of the building, the roundabout was redeveloped into a concrete esplanade lined with continuous benches and a large step leading to the north-east.

On 21 December 2005, the Atomium's new outdoor lighting was tested. The meridians of each sphere were covered with rectangular steel plates, in which LED lighting was integrated. The LED application illuminates the bulbs at night. The lights can also flash simultaneously or in turns along each meridian, symbolising the range of an electron around its core. In addition, the German industrial designer Ingo Maurer created lighting objects and installations for the building's interior.

On 14 February 2006, the Atomium was officially reopened by then-Prince Philippe, and on 18 February 2006, it opened again to the public. The renovation cost €26 million. Brussels and the Atomium Association covered one-third of the costs, whilst the Belgian government financed the remaining two-thirds. To help finance the renovation, pieces of the old aluminium plates were sold to the public as souvenirs. A triangular piece measuring approximately 2 metres (7 ft) in length sold for €1,000. In March 2006, a €2 commemorative coin depicting the building was issued to celebrate the renovation and reopening.

== Usage ==
Interior view of one of the spheres, used as exhibition space

The Atomium, with over 600,000 visitors per year, is the most popular tourist attraction in Brussels, and acts as an international symbol of both the city and country. In addition to its heritage value, it is also a cultural venue and an arts centre. Over half of the building is dedicated to exhibitions with themes about Belgium and digital arts.

Of the six spheres accessible to the public: the bottom sphere is reserved for permanent exhibitions dedicated to the 1950s, Expo 58 and the building's construction; the second sphere hosts temporary exhibitions; the third and central spheres contain flexible spaces that can be rented for events, such as film screenings, concerts, parties and conferences; the top sphere, in addition to the panorama, holds a restaurant; and the sixth sphere is the kids' sphere, intended for the organisation of workshops in urban pedagogy, allowing children aged six to twelve to spend the night there.

== Worldwide copyright claims ==
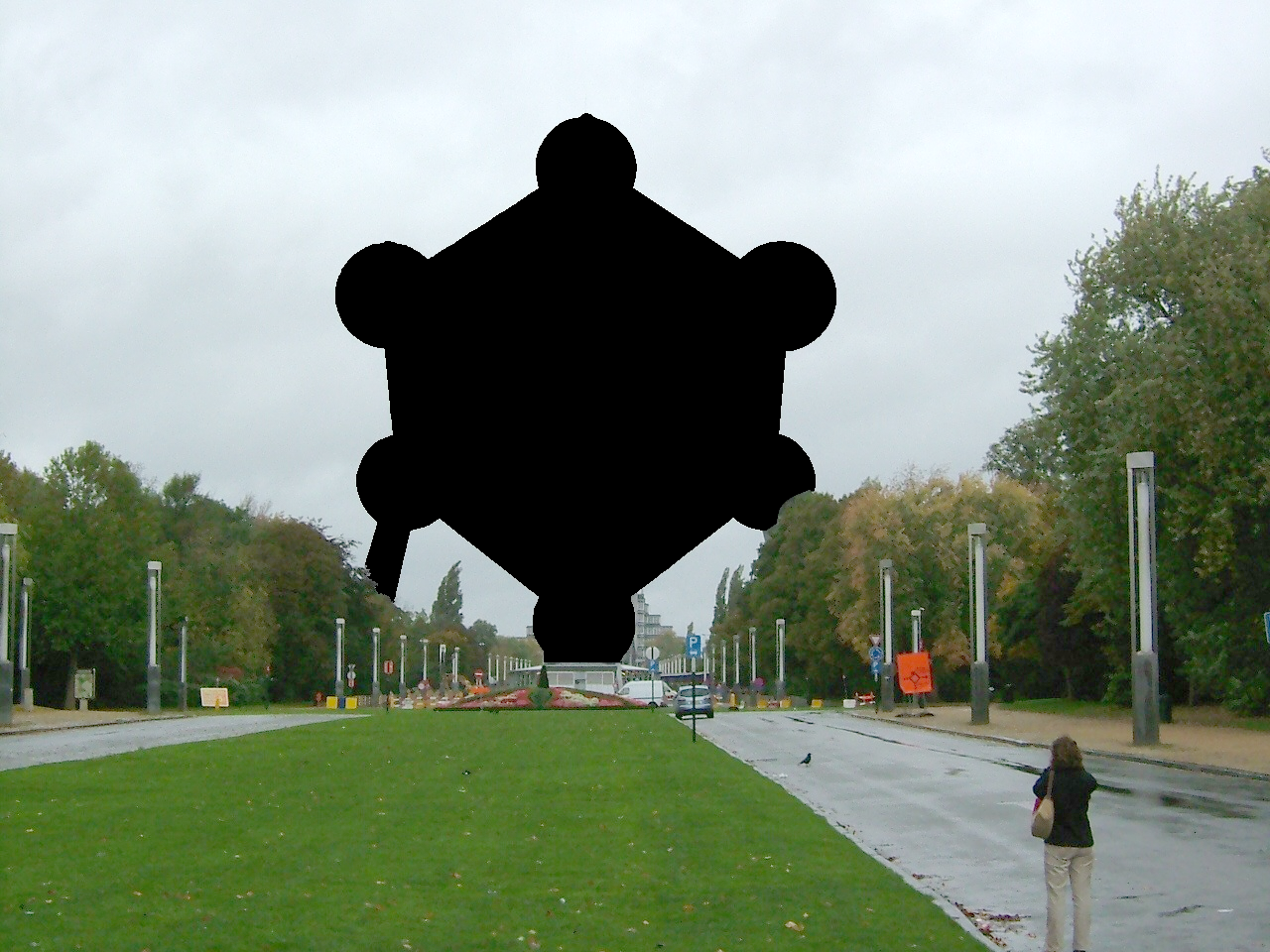
A photograph of the Atomium in 2006, censored due to lack of freedom of panorama rights at the time

SABAM, Belgium's society for collecting copyrights, had previously claimed worldwide intellectual property rights on all reproductions of the Atomium's image via the United States Artists Rights Society (ARS). For example, in 2003, SABAM issued a demand that a United States website remove all images of the Atomium from its pages. The website owner responded by replacing all such images with a warning not to take photographs of the Atomium, stating that A.S.B.L. Atomium would sue any individual or group who showed the photographs to anyone. SABAM confirmed then that permission was required.

In 2008, Anno Expo, who organised 50th anniversary celebrations of Expo 58 in Mechelen, announced a "cultural guerrilla strike" by asking people to send in their old photographs of the Atomium and 100 photoshoppers to paint over the spheres. SABAM responded that they would make an exception for 2008, allowing people to publish private photographs for one year, provided they were for non-commercial purposes. Anno Expo later announced they had censored part of their own report due to "complications" and referred to a meeting they had with SABAM. Mechelen's mayor, Bart Somers, called the Atomium copyright rules absurd.

In the summer of 2015, the Belgian political party Open Vld, which was part of the then-ruling Michel I Government, proposed a bill to enable freedom of panorama in Belgium. The bill was enacted into law in June 2016, allowing pictures of the Atomium, and other public buildings under copyright, to be legally distributed.

== Gallery ==
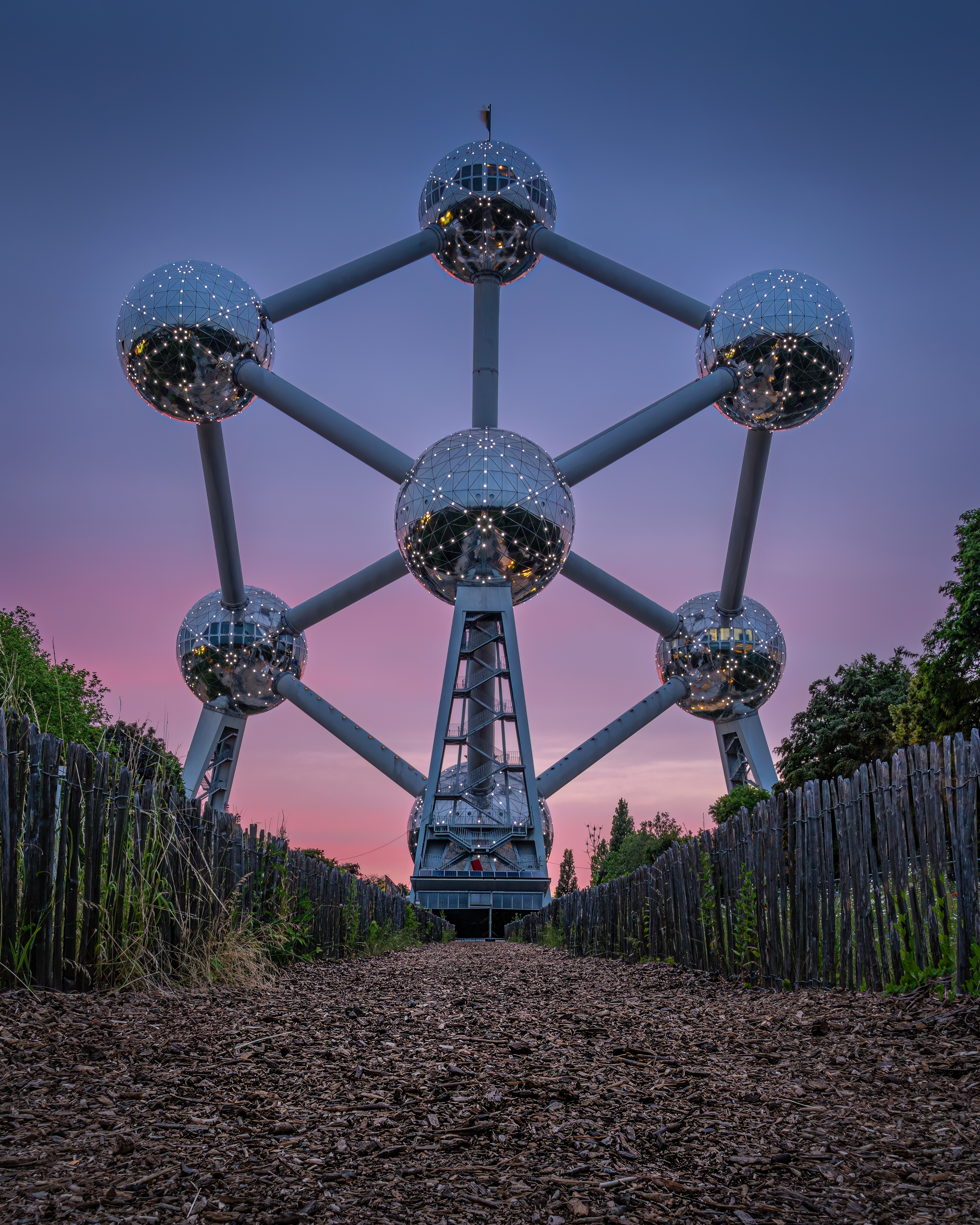
The Atomium during twilight

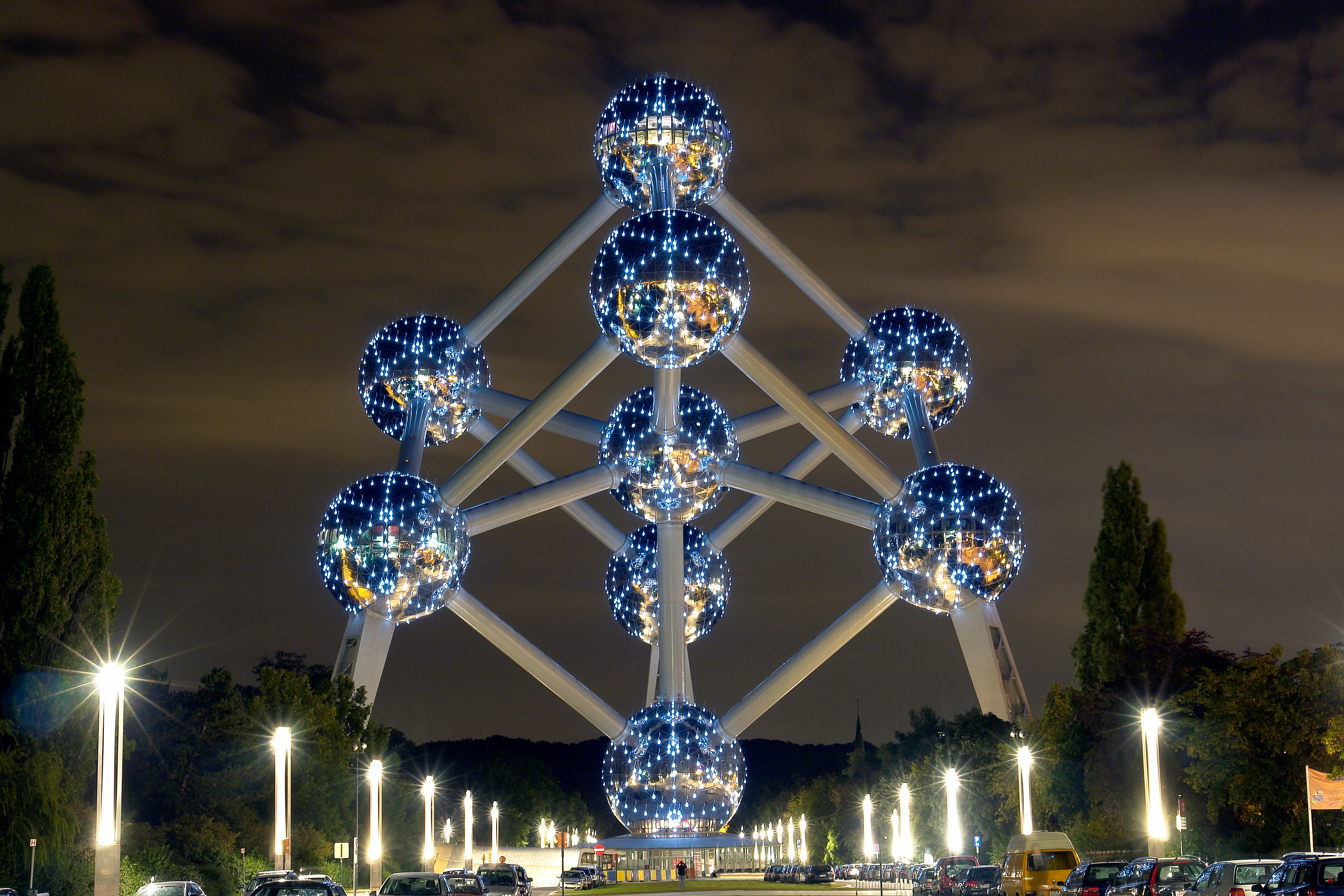
Illuminated spheres with LED lighting

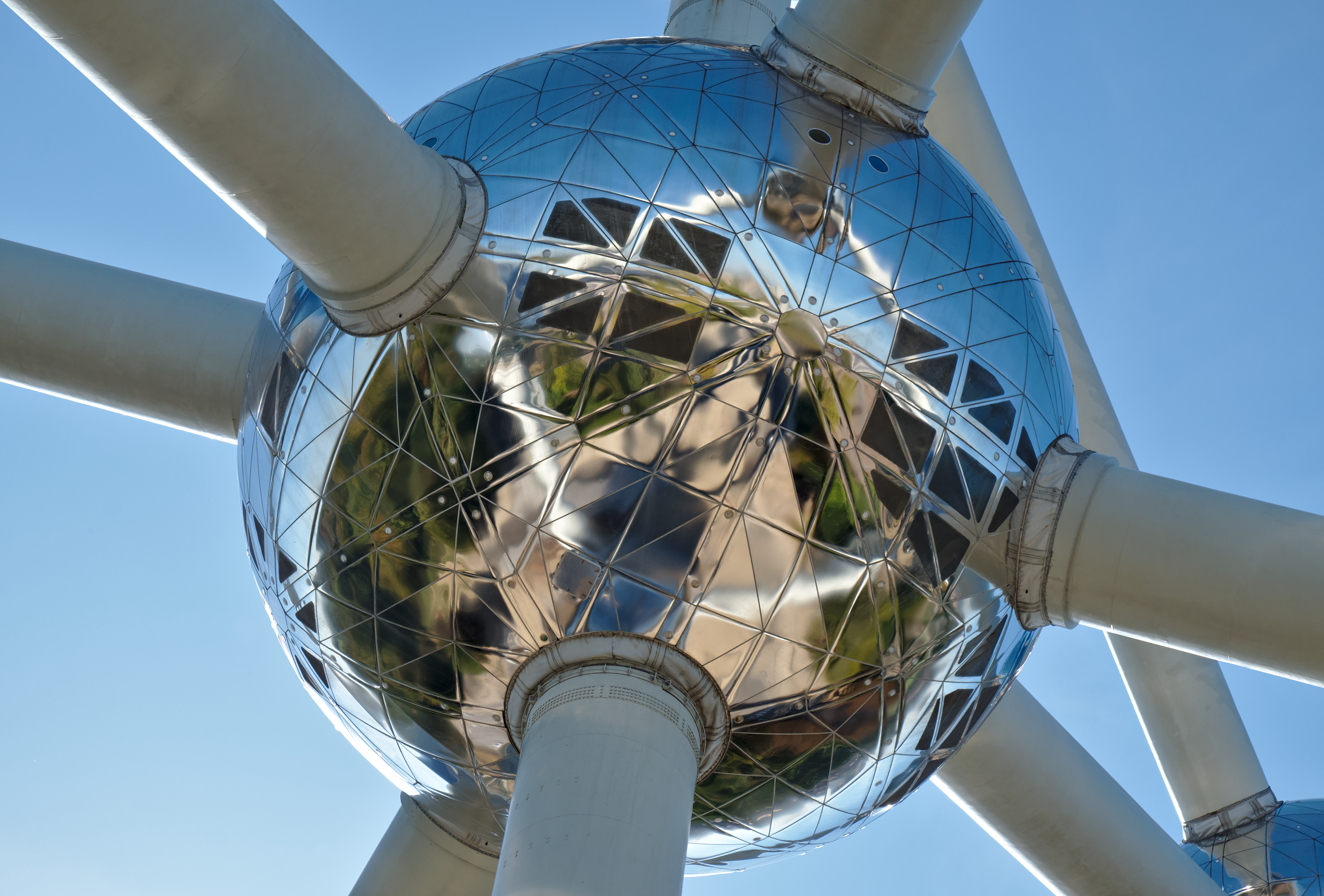
Central sphere

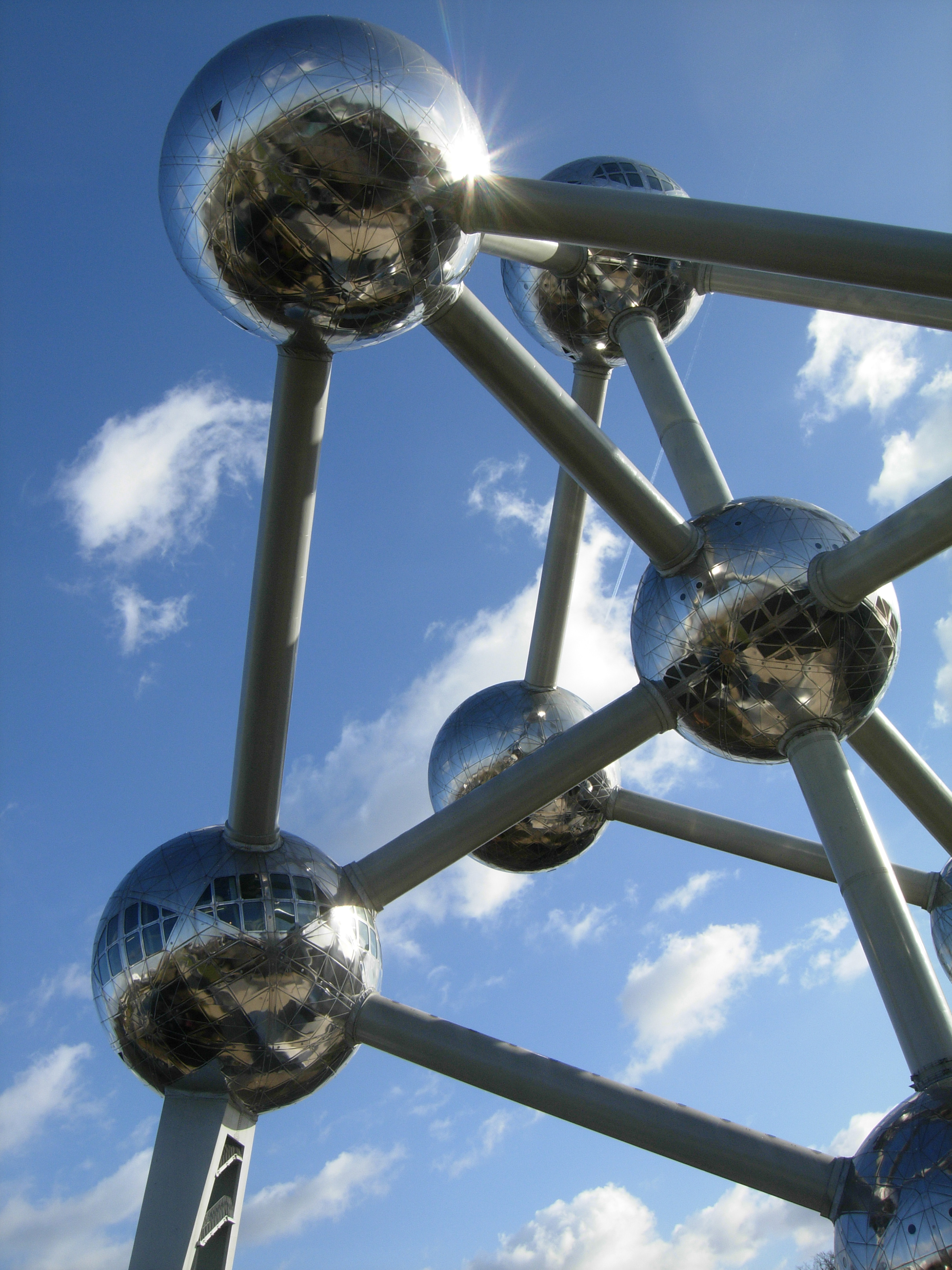
Several spheres

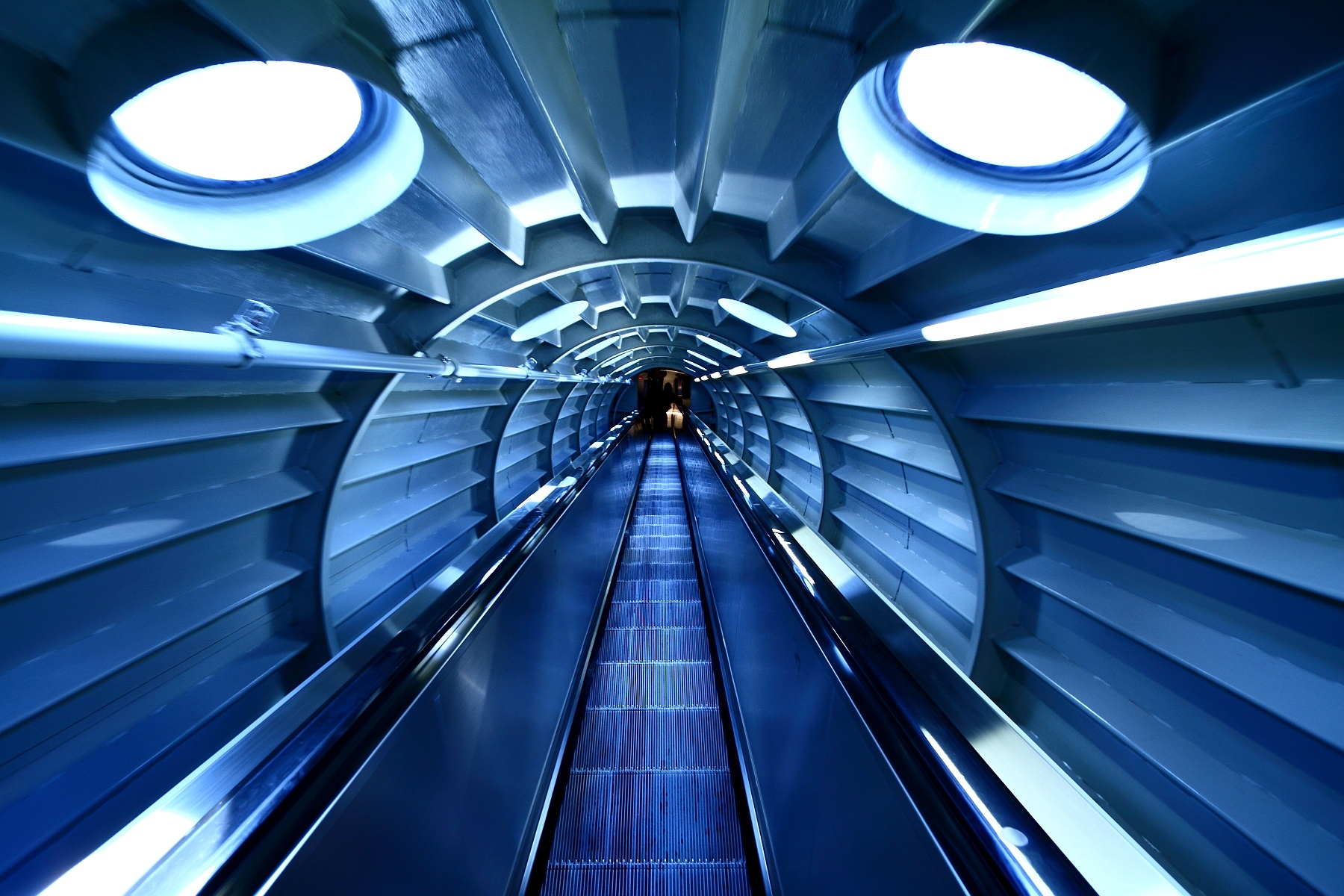
One of the escalators connecting the spheres

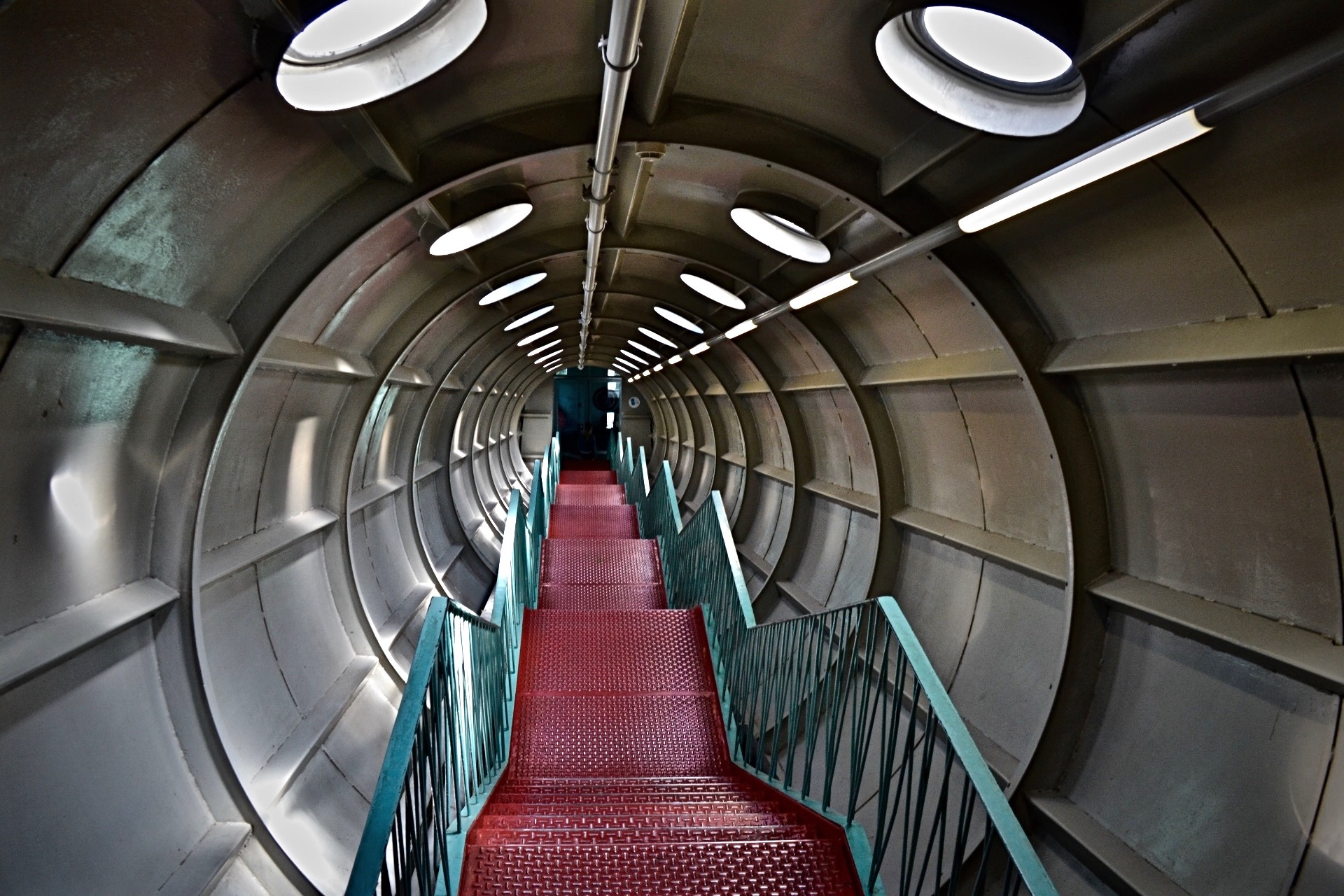
Stairwell

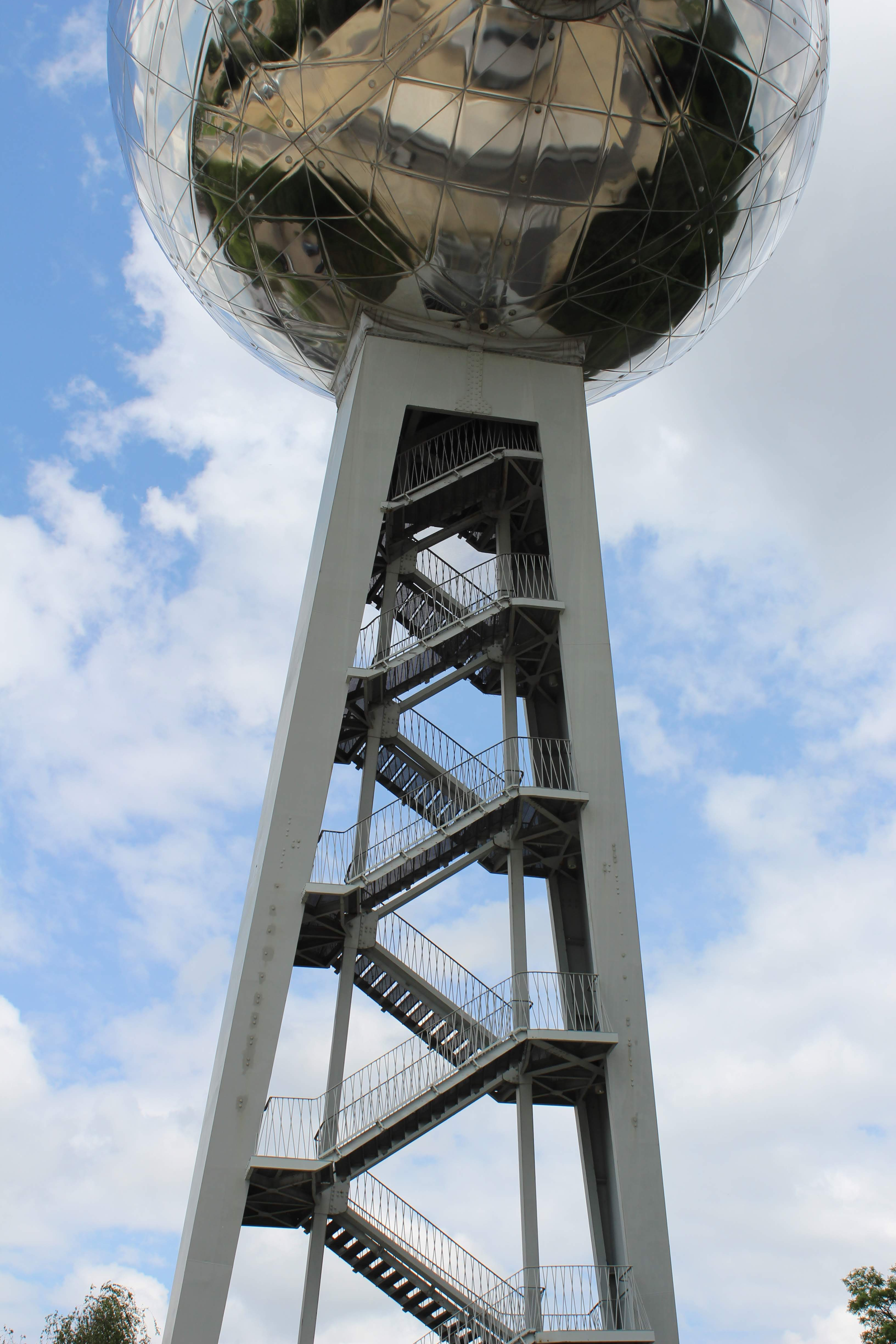
Exterior (emergency) staircase

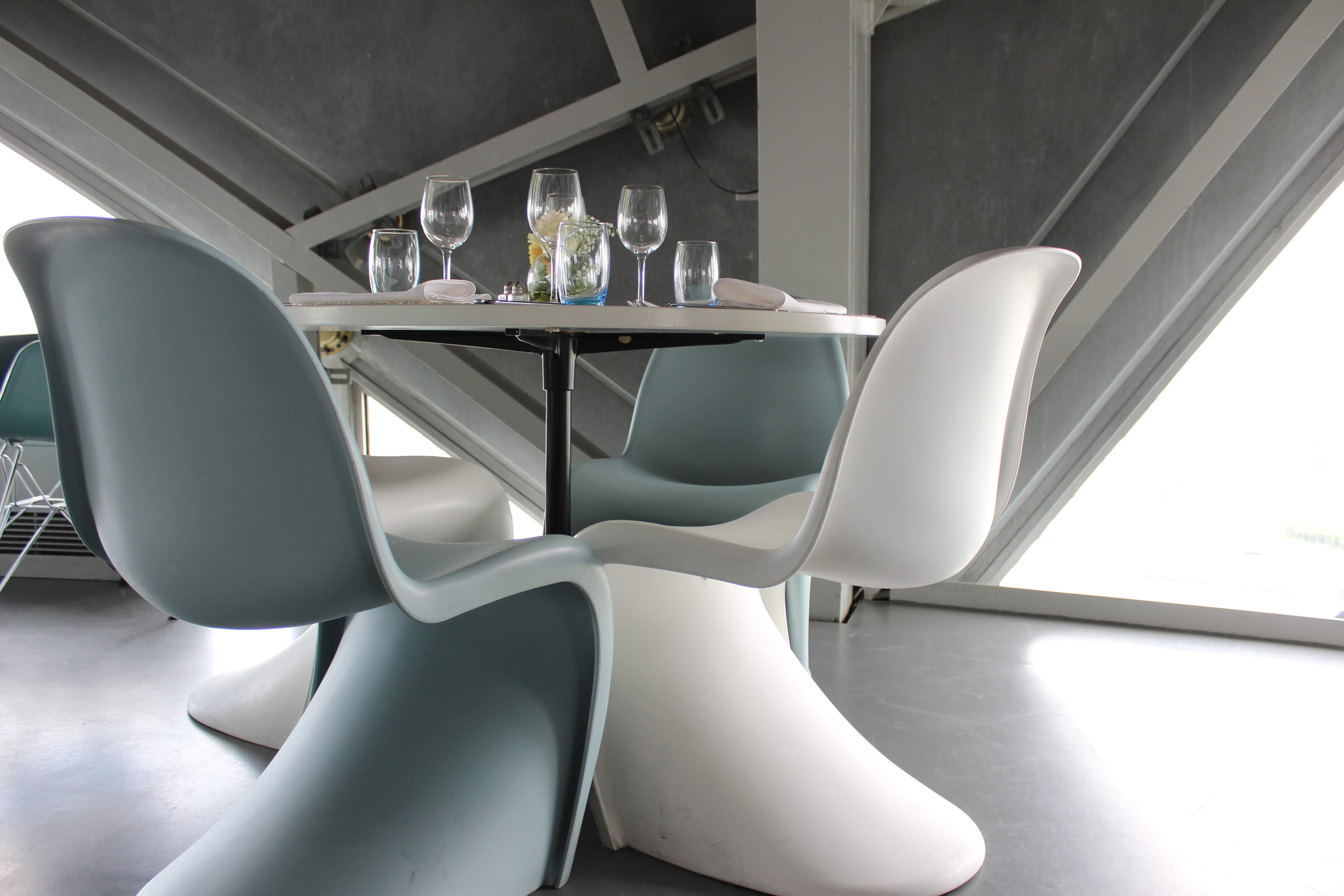
Restaurant above the main observation deck

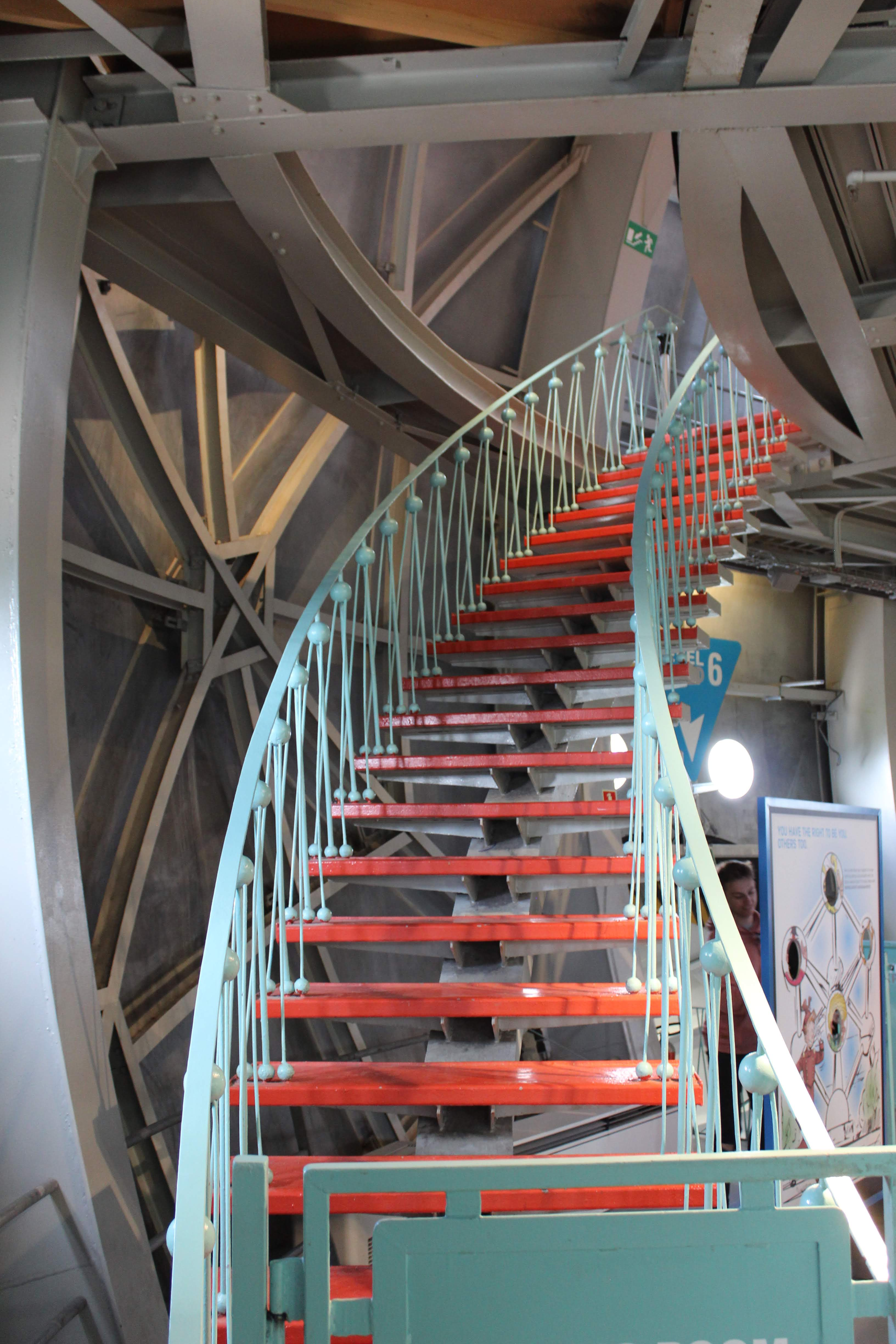
Interior stairs to ground level

== See also ==
- List of tallest structures in Belgium
- Design Museum Brussels
- History of Brussels
- Culture of Belgium
