= Paper (magazine) =

Fashion magazine

- November 2014 "Break the Internet" cover featuring Kim Kardashian
- Editor-in-chief: Justin Moran
- Former editors: Mickey Boardman; David Hershkovits; Kim Hastreiter
- Categories: Fashion, music, pop culture, art
- Frequency: Quarterly
- Founder: Kim Hastreiter; David Hershkovits
- Founded: 1984
- Final issue: September 2020 (print)
- Company: ENTtech Media Group
- Country: United States
- Based in: New York City
- Language: English
- Website: papermag.com
- ISSN: 1073-9122
- OCLC: 473127775

Paper (also known as Paper Mag) is a New York City-based independent magazine focusing on fashion, popular culture, nightlife, music, art, and film. Initially produced monthly, the magazine eventually became a quarterly publication, and a digital version was made available online at papermag.com.

In 2020, physical production of the magazine was paused following the onset of the COVID-19 pandemic in the United States. The publication continued to create and release content online via its website.

== History ==
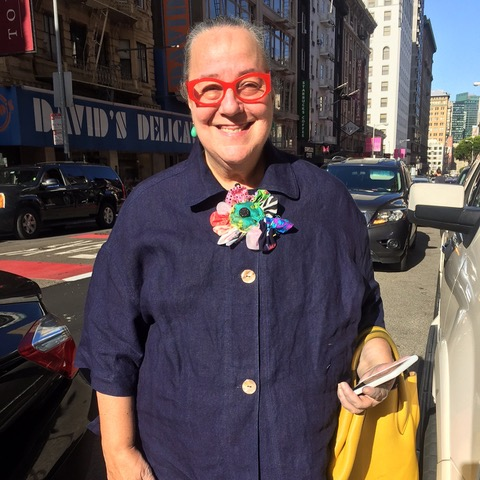
Kim Hastreiter, co-founder of Paper magazine

Paper was founded in 1984 by Kim Hastreiter and David Hershkovits, former editors at the SoHo Weekly News, with help from Lucy Sisman and Richard Weigand. Beginning as a monthly print magazine in the form of a black and white 16-page fold-out, it has since transformed into a quarterly print and digital magazine.

Past cover models include Kim Kardashian, Katy Perry, Miley Cyrus, Prince, CL, (Note: joint cover with Jeremy Scott) Kacey Musgraves, Jennifer Lopez, and BTS.

In 2017, Hastreiter and Hershkovits sold the company to ENTtech Media Group, an entertainment technology company founded by former Condé Nast and Advanstar executive Tom Florio, and Drew Elliott, the Chief Creative Officer of Paper. Elliot left Paper in October 2019, to become the new Global Creative Director at MAC Cosmetics.

In 2020, following the onset of the COVID-19 pandemic, print production of the magazine was suspended. The final physical issue released was the Spring 2020 edition that featured Lady Gaga on the cover. Florio told WWD he was unsure when publication would resume, or if the company would continue with it at all, saying "Part of me is open enough to allow this thing to really roll out digitally and socially in the way where most people know Paper. Most people know Paper — like the kids, the Gen Z — through this social engagement. [Layoffs are] so terrible. I've never been in a situation where you couldn't ask more from people, but because of crazy life circumstances you have to make these decisions." The magazine's digital content was unaffected and continued to be published.

Digital Director Justin Moran succeeded Elliot as editor-in-chief in July 2022.

In April 2023, in the wake of reduced advertising revenues since the pandemic, the magazine's staff was laid off and editorial operations ceased. The company itself did not shut down, but was seeking alternative options to remain in operation. In September 2023, Paper resumed operations with Justin Moran returning as editor-in-chief after the publication was acquired by Brian Calle & Street Media in June.

== "Break the Internet" ==
In November 2014, Kim Kardashian was the cover star of the "Break the Internet" issue. Kardashian was interviewed by Paper contributor Amanda Fortini for the spread "No Filter: An Afternoon with Kim Kardashian". The photos for the issue were taken by Jean–Paul Goude. The shoot was a re-creation of Goude's "Champagne Incident", a series of photographs from his 1982 book Jungle Fever. The cover photo, as well as the rest of the spread, featured a fully nude Kardashian.

The story received over 34 million unique page-views by December 2014, more than double the number of page-views Paper normally received annually, and went on to generate more than 70 million monthly unique visitors to the website.

== Books ==
Hastreiter and Hershkovits co-authored two books under the company's label. The first of the pair, published by Paper Publishing Company in association with Distributed Art Publishers in 1999, was titled From AbFab to Zen: Paper's Guide to Pop Culture, and had photography from John Waters. The second, titled 20 Years of Style: The World According to Paper, was published by HarperCollins in 2004 and featured writing from Michael Musto, John Waters, Isaac Mizrahi, Pedro Almodovar, Todd Oldham, Patrick McMullan, and Anna Sui.

== Spanish language edition ==
On November 12, 2025, Paper magazine launched its Spanish edition with singer Rauw Alejandro on its cover.
