= David Hershkovits =

American writer and publisher

David Hershkovits is an American writer and publisher. He was the co-founder of Paper magazine and is now president of Cultural Content Consultancy.

== Biography ==
Hershkovits was raised in Brooklyn, New York, and graduated with a BA in literature from Yeshiva University and an M.A. from Penn State University.

While living in New Orleans, he taught at the University of New Orleans, and wrote for the New Orleans Courier and New Orleans Magazine. He then returned to New York, and worked in various editorial roles including Assistant Managing Editor of the SoHo Weekly News. In 1984, together with fellow SoHo Weekly News editor Kim Hastreiter, Hershkovits co-founded Paper magazine which started out as a black and white fold-out poster. He served as Editor In Chief and CEO until 2017 when Paper was acquired by EntTech Media.

Hershkovits has published articles on pop culture and politics in numerous newspapers and magazines, including GQ, Vanity Fair, the German magazine Max, High Times, The New York Post, The Daily News and Newsday. He currently writes a monthly column in Paper called "Eyespy."

Since 2019, Hershkovits has been the host of the podcast Light Culture focusing on the cultural, artistic and public influence of cannabis culture.
