= Fruition (digital marketing agency) =

Digital marketing agency in Colorado, USA

- Industry: Digital marketing
- Founder: Brad Anderson
- Headquarters: Denver, Colorado, United States
- Website: fruition.net

Fruition is a digital marketing agency based in Denver, Colorado. The company was founded by Brad Anderson.

== Google Penalty Checker ==
Fruition's Google Penalty Checker is a tool that uses Google Analytics data to assess whether a website may have been affected by Google algorithm updates.
