= Ingo Maurer =

German industrial designer (1932–2019)

- Born: 12 May 1932; Reichenau Island, Lake Constance, Germany
- Died: 21 October 2019 (aged 87); Munich, Bavaria, Germany
- Education: Munich University of Applied Sciences
- Occupations: Graphic designer; Industrial designer
- Organizations: Ingo Maurer GmbH
- Awards: Royal Designers for Industry; Design Award of the Federal Republic of Germany; Compasso d'Oro

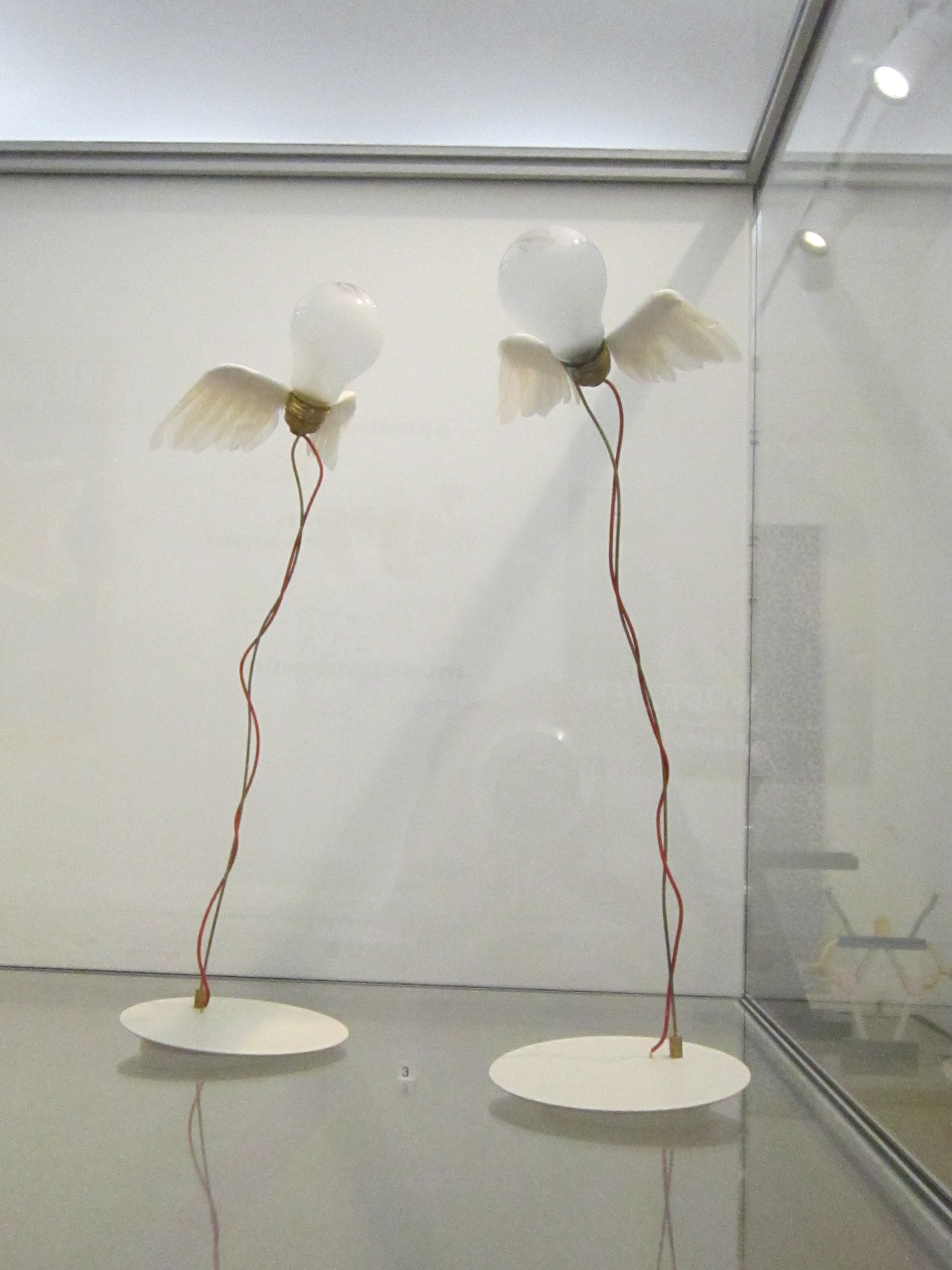
Lamps with wings by Ingo Maurer, 2015

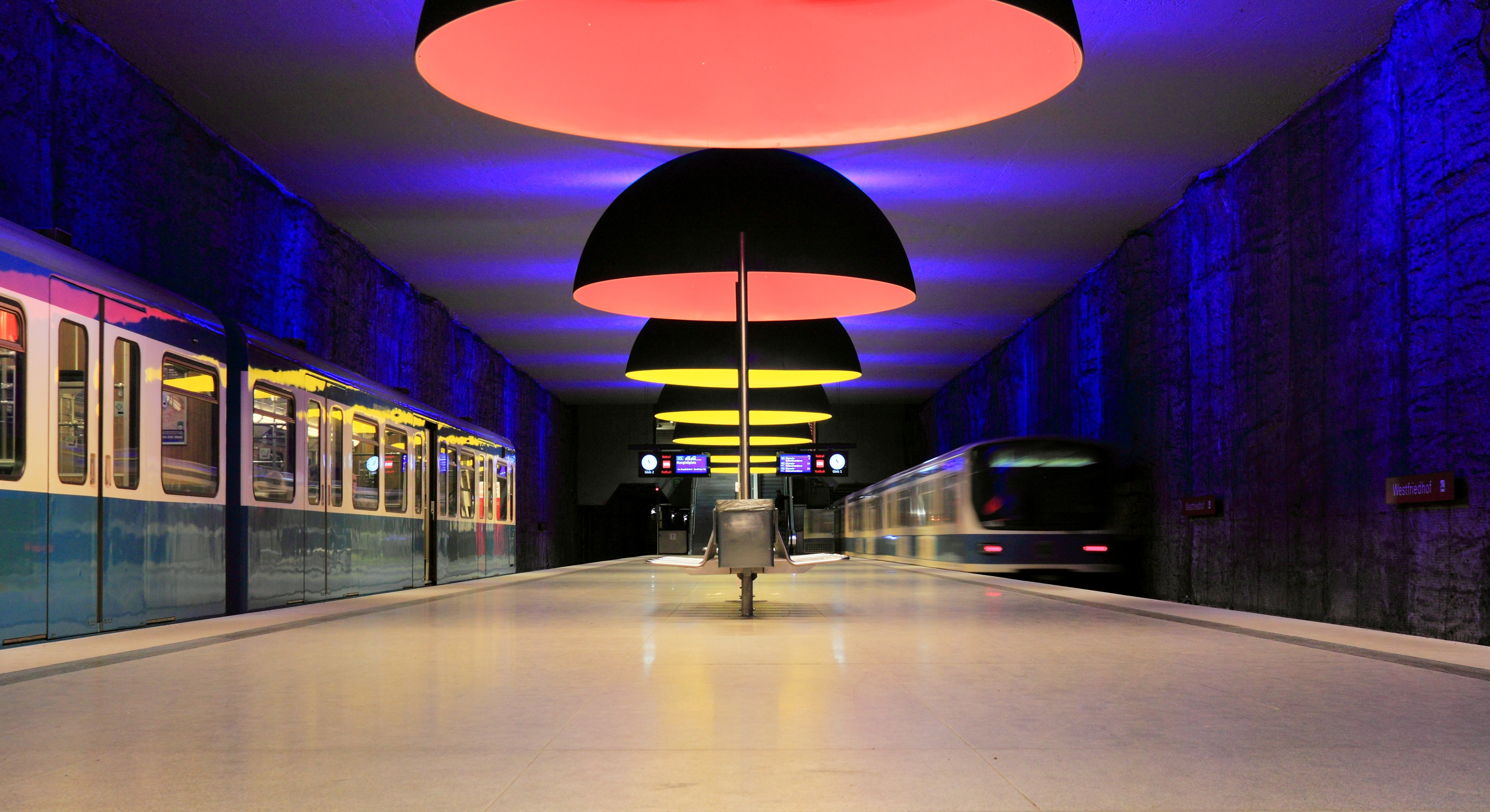
Lighting at the U-Bahn station Westfriedhof in Munich

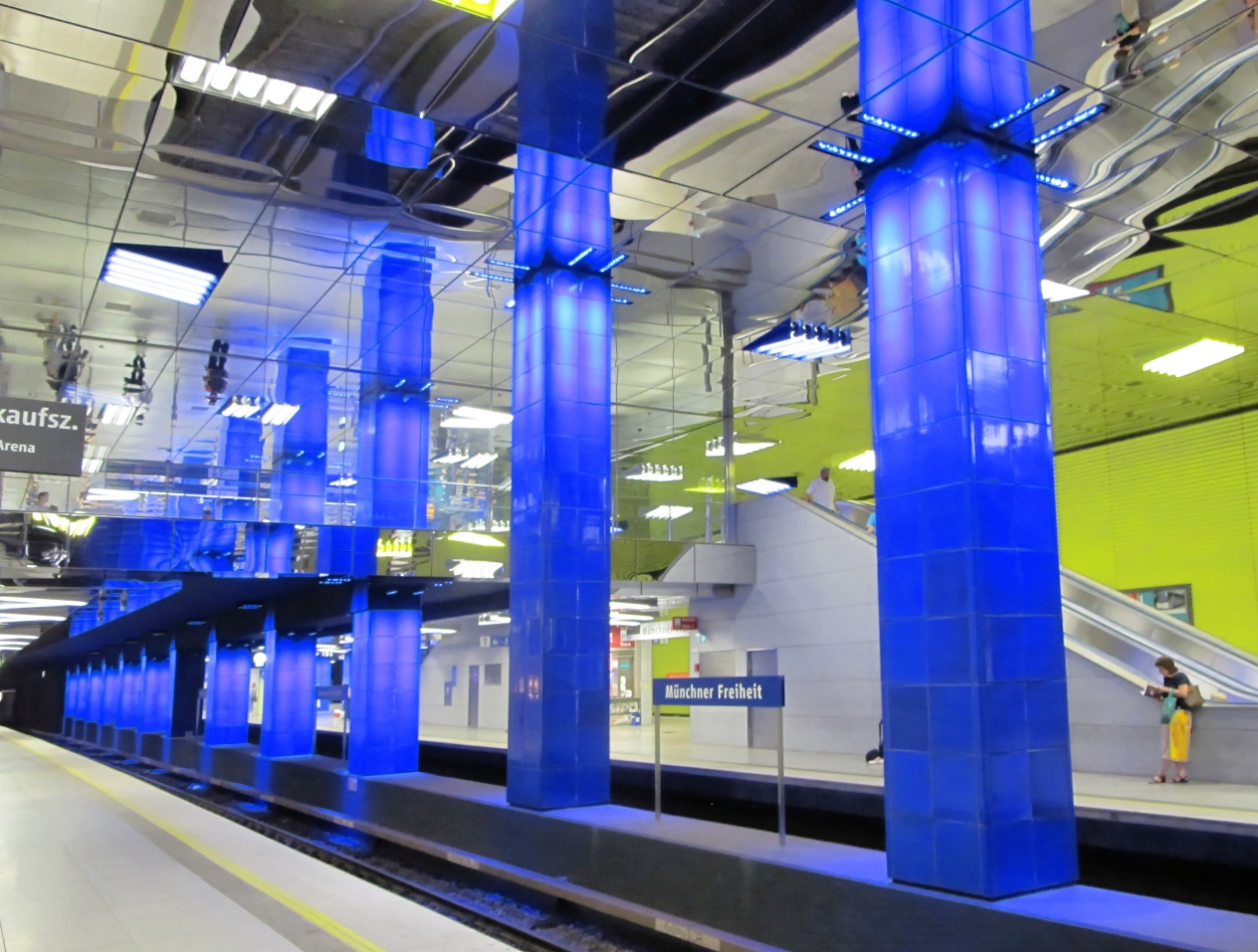
Lighting at the U-Bahn station Münchner Freiheit

Ingo Maurer (12 May 1932 – 21 October 2019) was a German industrial designer who specialised in the design of lamps and light installations. He was nicknamed "poet of light".

== Early life and career ==
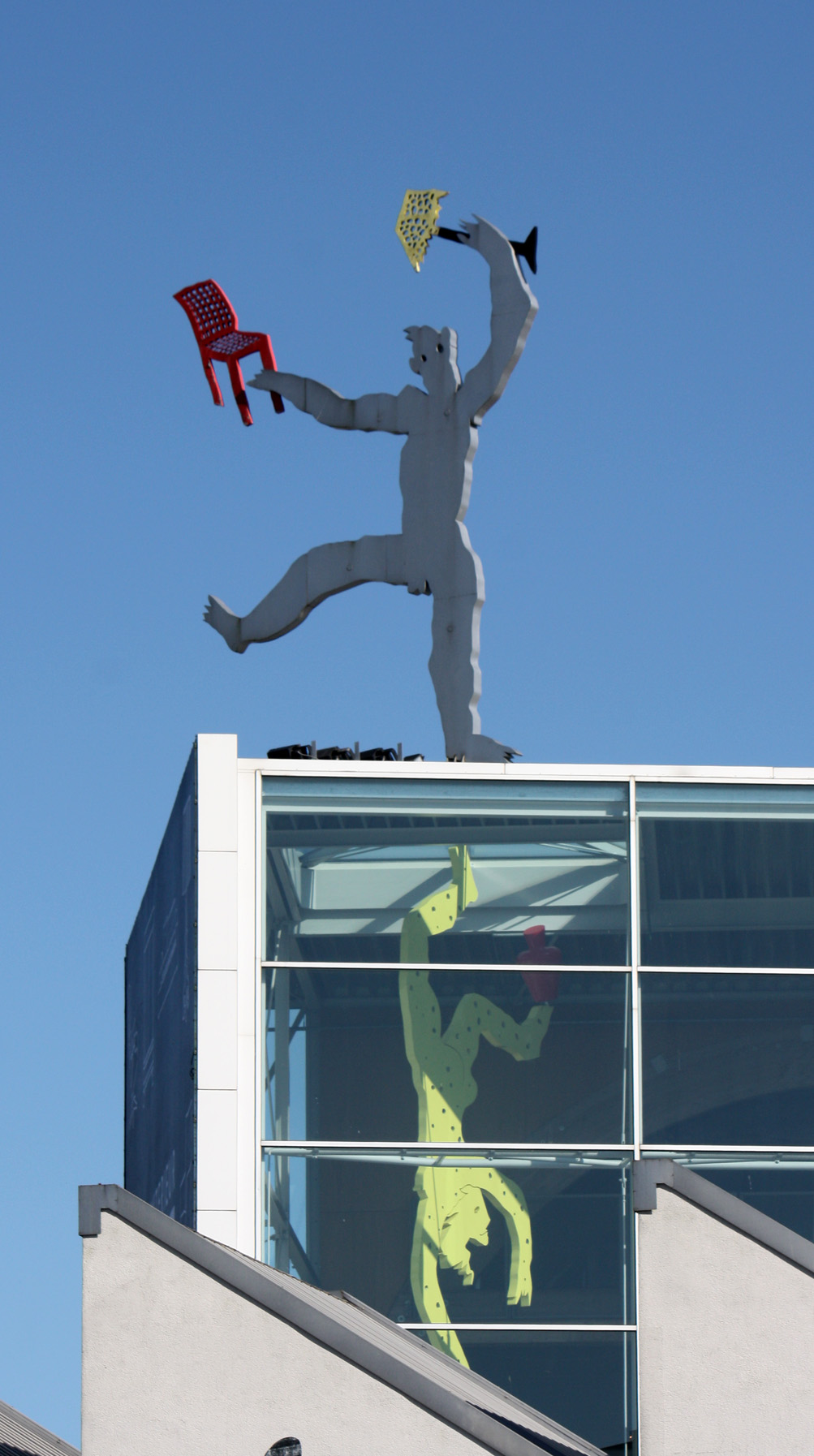
Sculpture without title by Ingo Maurer in Groningen, Netherlands

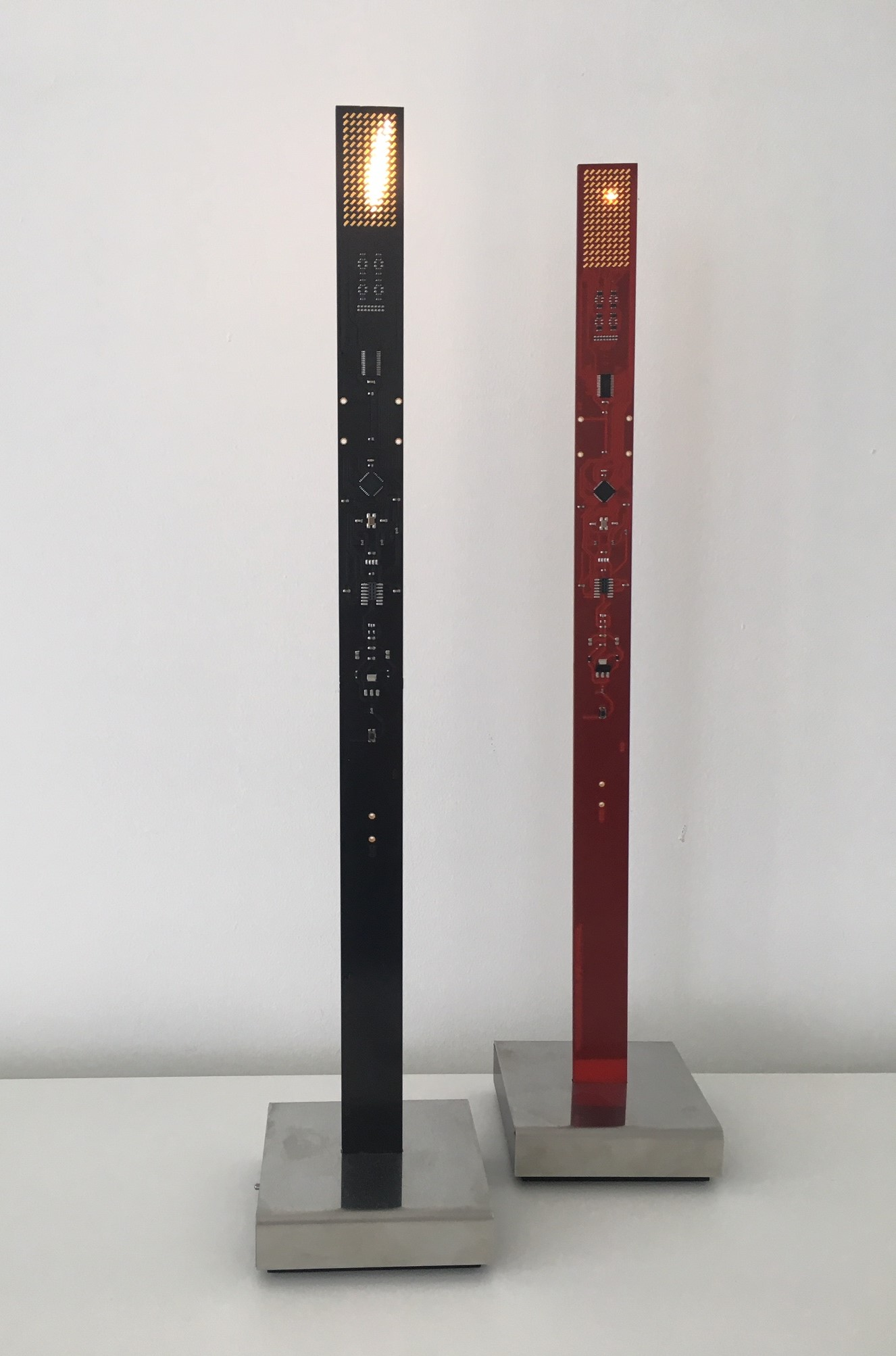
Lighting fixture "My New Flame" by Moritz Waldemeyer for Ingo Maurer

Maurer was born in Reichenau Island, Lake Constance, Germany. He was the son of a fisherman and grew up on Reichenau with four siblings. After an apprenticeship as typesetter, he studied graphic design in Munich. In 1960 Maurer left Germany for the U.S., where he worked in New York and San Francisco as a freelance graphic designer, including for IBM.

== Career ==
In 1963, Maurer moved back to Germany and founded Design M, a company developing and manufacturing lamps of his own designs. The company was later renamed to "Ingo Maurer GmbH".

One of Maurer's first designs, the Bulb (1969), was included in the design collection of the Museum of Modern Art in 1969.

In 1984 he presented the low-voltage wire system YaYaHo, consisting of two horizontally fixed metal ropes and a series of adjustable lighting elements with halogen bulbs; it became an instant success. Maurer was asked to create special YaYaHo installations for the exhibition "Lumières je pense à vous" ("Lights I think of you") at Centre Georges Pompidou in Paris, the Villa Medici in Rome, and the Institut Francais d'Architecture in Paris.

In 1989 Fondation Cartier pour l'Art Contemporain (Cartier Foundation for Contemporary Art) in Jouy-en-Josas near Paris organized the exhibition "Ingo Maurer: Lumière Hasard Réflexion" (Ingo Maurer: Light Chance Reflection). For this exhibition, Maurer created lighting objects and installations that were not meant for serial production for the first time.

Since 1989, his design and objects have been presented in a series of exhibitions, including the Stedelijk Museum in Amsterdam (1993). In 2002 the Vitra Design Museum organized Ingo Maurer – Light – Reaching for the Moon, a travelling exhibition with several shows in Europe and in Japan. In 2007 the Cooper Hewitt, Smithsonian Design Museum in New York presented the exhibition Provoking Magic: Lighting of Ingo Maurer.

Maurer created many objects using LEDs. The first was the lighting object Bellissima Brutta in 1996. In 2001 he presented a table lamp with LEDs with the name EL.E.Dee. Since 2006, he is also experimenting with organic light-emitting diodes, presenting two objects in 2006, and a table lamp as limited edition.

Besides the design of lamps for serial production, Ingo Maurer created and planned light installation for public or private spaces. In Munich, he created light installations at Westfriedhof subway station (1998), and the renovation and lighting concept for Münchner Freiheit U-Bahn station opened in December 2009. For Issey Miyake he realised an installation for a fashion show in Paris (1999). From 2003–05 he designed an entrance and lighting objects for the Kruisherenhotel in Maastricht. In 2006 he created lighting objects and installations for the interior of the Atomium in Brussels.

Among his most well-known designs are the winged bulb Lucellino (1989) and Porca Miseria! (1994), a suspension lamp made with porcelain shards. From the early 1980s on Maurer worked with a team of younger designers and developers.

In 2011, the redesign for the underground area of the Marienplatz U-Bahn station in Munich, Germany, was awarded to Maurer with Allmann Sattler Wappner. Maurer GmbH had two showrooms, one in Munich and the other in New York.

Maurer died in a Munich hospital on 21 October 2019.

He opposed the European Union's ban of incandescent light bulbs and predicted that it would cause a "drastic reduction in quality of life" and a "boom for psychiatrists." He unsuccessfully advocated for declaring light bulbs as world cultural heritage.

== Awards ==
- 2000 Lucky Strike Designer Award of Raymond Loewy Foundation, Germany
- 2002 Collab's Design Excellence Award, Philadelphia Museum of Art
- 2003 Georg Jensen Prize, Copenhagen
- 2003 Oribe Award, Japan
- 2005 Royal Designers for Industry, Royal Society of Arts, London
- 2006 Honorary doctorate of Royal College of Art, London
- 2010 Design Award of the Federal Republic of Germany
- 2011 Compasso d'Oro, category career

== Literature ==
- Helmut Bauer (Editor): Ingo Maurer. Making Light. Nazraeli Press, Portland 1992
- Ingo Maurer (ed.): The International Design Yearbook 2000. Laurence King Publishing, London 2000, 240 p. (Essays by Philippe Starck, Ron Arad, Mario Bellini and Jasper Morrison)
- Alexander von Vegesack et al.; Ingo Maurer: Light – Reaching for the Moon. Vitra Design Museum, Weil am Rhein 2003
- Michael Webb, Jamee Ruth, Marisa Bartolucci (ed.): Ingo Maurer. Compact Design Portfolio. Chronicle Books, San Francisco 2003
- Kim Hastreiter et al.: Provoking Magic. Lighting of Ingo Maurer. Cooper-Hewitt Museum, New York 2008
