= Fruition (fashion company) =

Clothing boutique in Las Vegas, Nevada

- Industry: Clothing retail
- Founded: 2005; 21 years ago
- Headquarters: Las Vegas, Nevada, United States
- Website: www.fruitionlv.com

Fruition is a clothing boutique in Las Vegas, Nevada, co-founded in 2005 by Chris Julian and Samantha Alonso. It sells vintage clothing and customized garments.

== History ==
Virgil Abloh designed the store's B.U.Y. N.O.W. logo. He also collaborated with Fruition through Pyrex and Off-White.

The store has also held recurring sales called Fruition Vineyards.
