= Timeline of Brussels (20th century) =

The following is a timeline of the history of Brussels, Belgium, in the 20th century.

== 1901–1913 – La Belle Époque ==
- 1901 – The Maison & Atelier Horta is built.

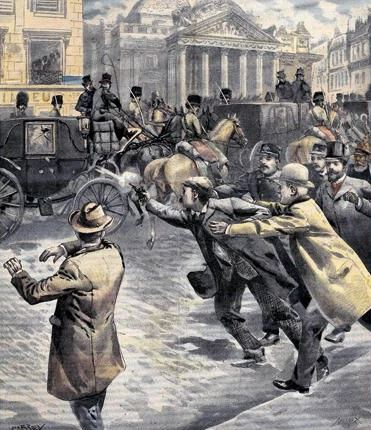
Assassination attempt on King Leopold II in Brussels, 15 November 1902

- 1902
  - À la Mort Subite café is built.
  - The Solvay Library is built.
  - The Sino-Belgian Bank is established at the request of King Leopold II.
  - The Sonian Forest Railway begins operation, connecting Petite-Espinette/Kleine Hut to Boitsfort/Bosvoorde railway station.
  - The Brussels Motor Show is first held.
  - Jean Neuhaus invents the praline.
  - 12 April: Riots erupt in the Marolles/Marollen during the Belgian general strike of 1902.
  - 15 November: An attempted assassination of King Leopold II by Gennaro Rubino takes place.
  - 16 November: The Solvay Institute of Sociology is established by industrialist Ernest Solvay.
- 1903
  - Le Falstaff café is built.
  - The École de Commerce Solvay business school is founded with a donation from Ernest Solvay.
  - December: The socialist De Gazet van Brussel starts publication.
- 1904
  - The Saint-Gilles Municipal Hall is built.
  - 26 June: Josaphat Park opens.

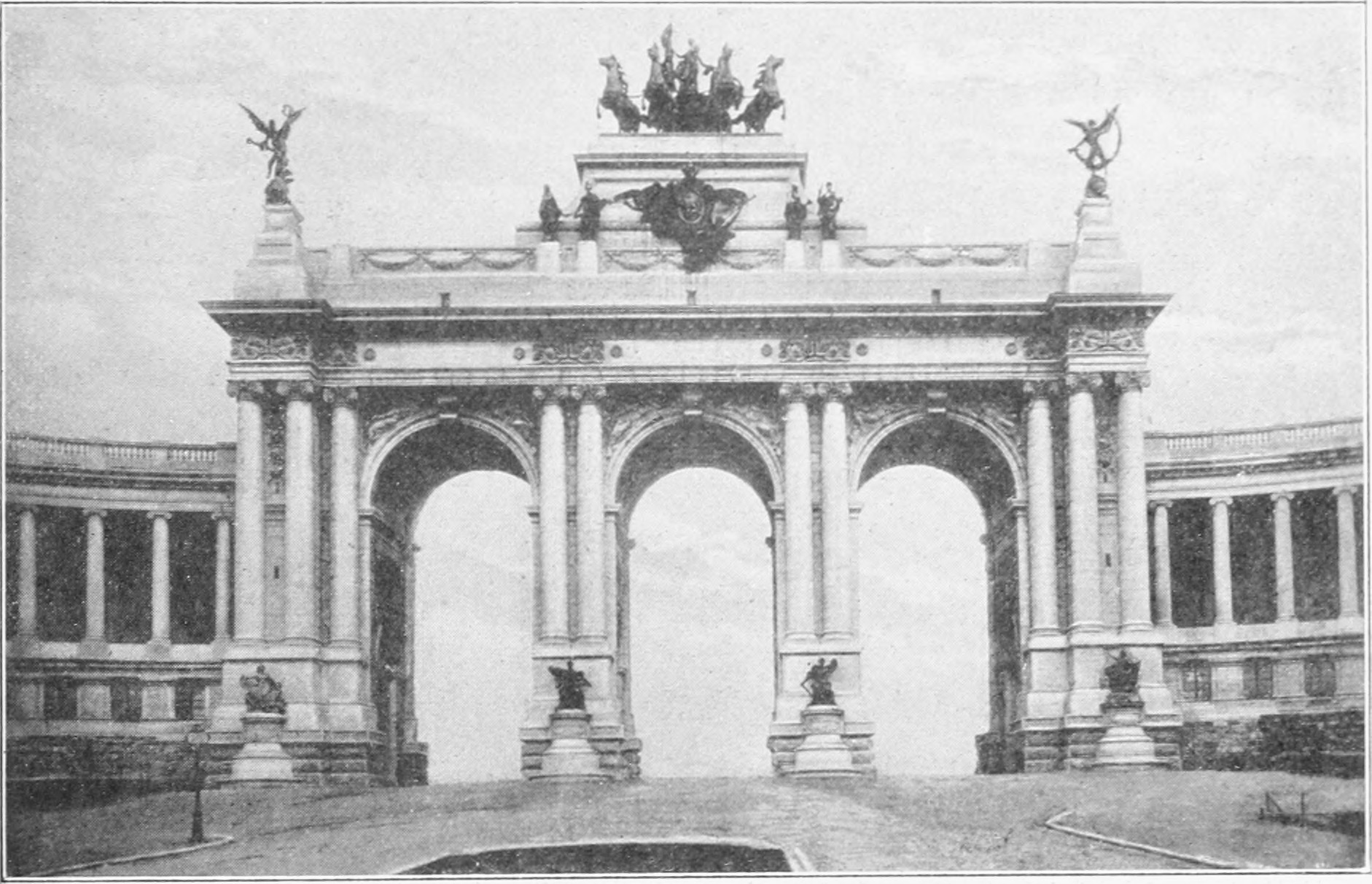
The Cinquantenaire/Jubelpark memorial arcade, built in 1905

- 1905
  - The Cauchie House is built.
  - Buses begin operating in the city.
  - 21 September: St. Michael's College opens in Etterbeek.
  - 25 September: The Cinquantenaire Arcade is completed.
- 1906
  - Buffalo Bill's Wild West Show takes place. 13 January: Besix is founded by the Stulemeijer family.
  - 7 February: The dismembered body of Jeanne Van Calck is found at 22, rue des Hirondelles/Zwaluwenstraat.
  - 24 February: Chilean diplomat Ernesto Balmaceda Bello is shot dead by Carlos Waddington, the brother of his fiancé Adelaida Waddington.
  - 2 May: The Yachting Club de Bruxelles is established.
- 1907 – 1 December: Annette Bellot is abducted while playing near the Place de Brouckère/De Brouckèreplein, and is found the next day raped and strangled near the Royal Veterinary School of Cureghem.
- 1908
  - The Chapel of the Resurrection is built.
  - The Society Against Cruelty to Animals is established in Veeweyde/Veeweide.
  - Verregat Hippodrome is established.
  - 27 May: R.S.C. Anderlecht is founded.
- 1909
  - 6 December: Adolphe Max is appointed mayor by royal decree.
  - 23 December: King Albert I takes the constitutional oath at the Palace of the Nation.

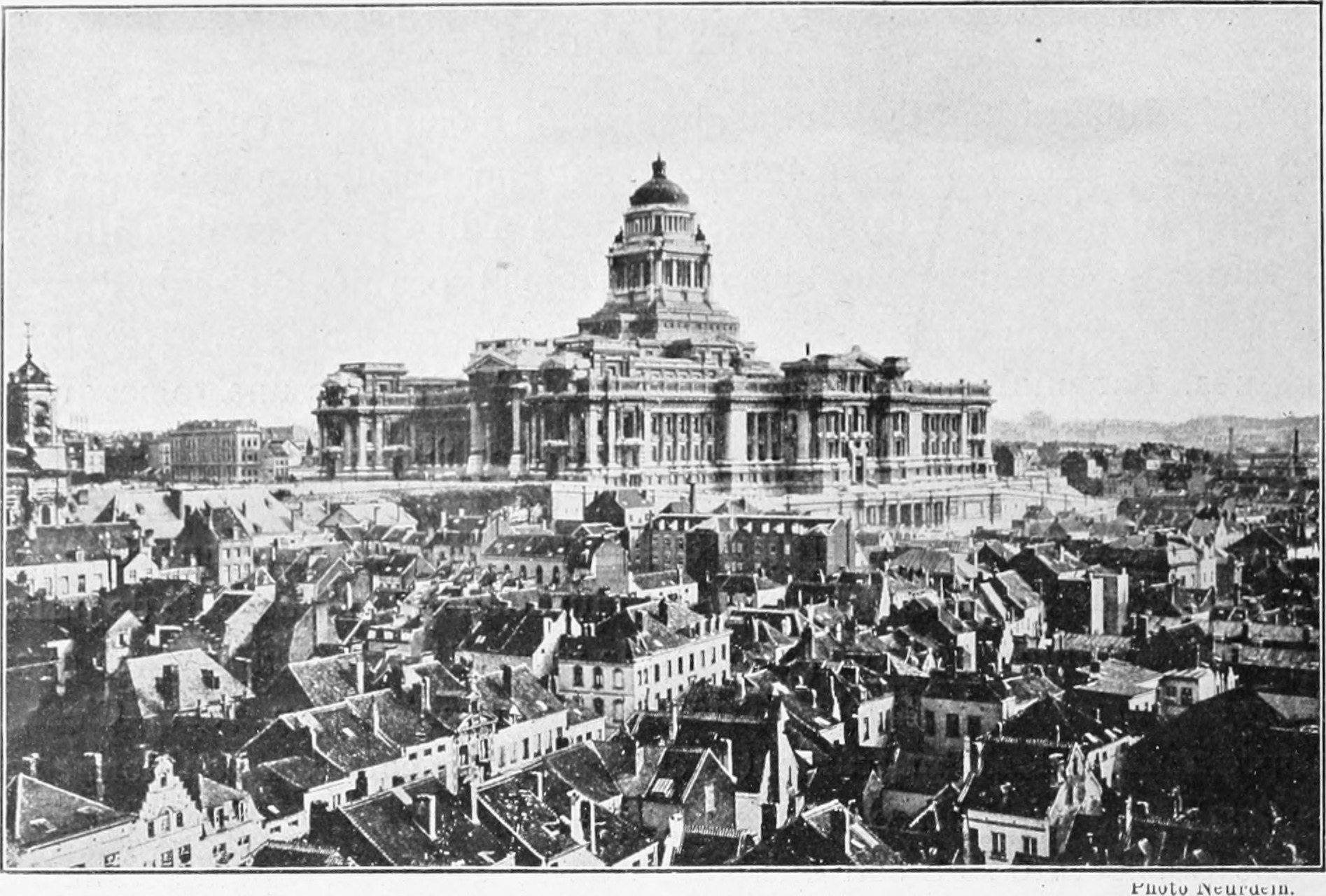
The Marolles/Marollen at the foot of the Palace of Justice, c. 1910

- 1910
  - The Hotel Astoria opens on the Rue Royale/Koningsstraat.
  - The original Mont des Arts/Kunstberg is inaugurated.
  - Henri Wittamer opens a bakery with his wife on the Square du Grand Sablon/Grote Zavelsquare.
  - 10 March: Le Mariage de mademoiselle Beulemans is first performed at the Théâtre de l'Olympia.
  - 23 April–1 November: The Brussels International world's fair is held.
  - 14–15 August: A fire destroys part of the Solbosch/Solbos section of the Brussels International Exposition.
  - 23 September: The Brussels Convention on Assistance and Salvage at Sea is signed.

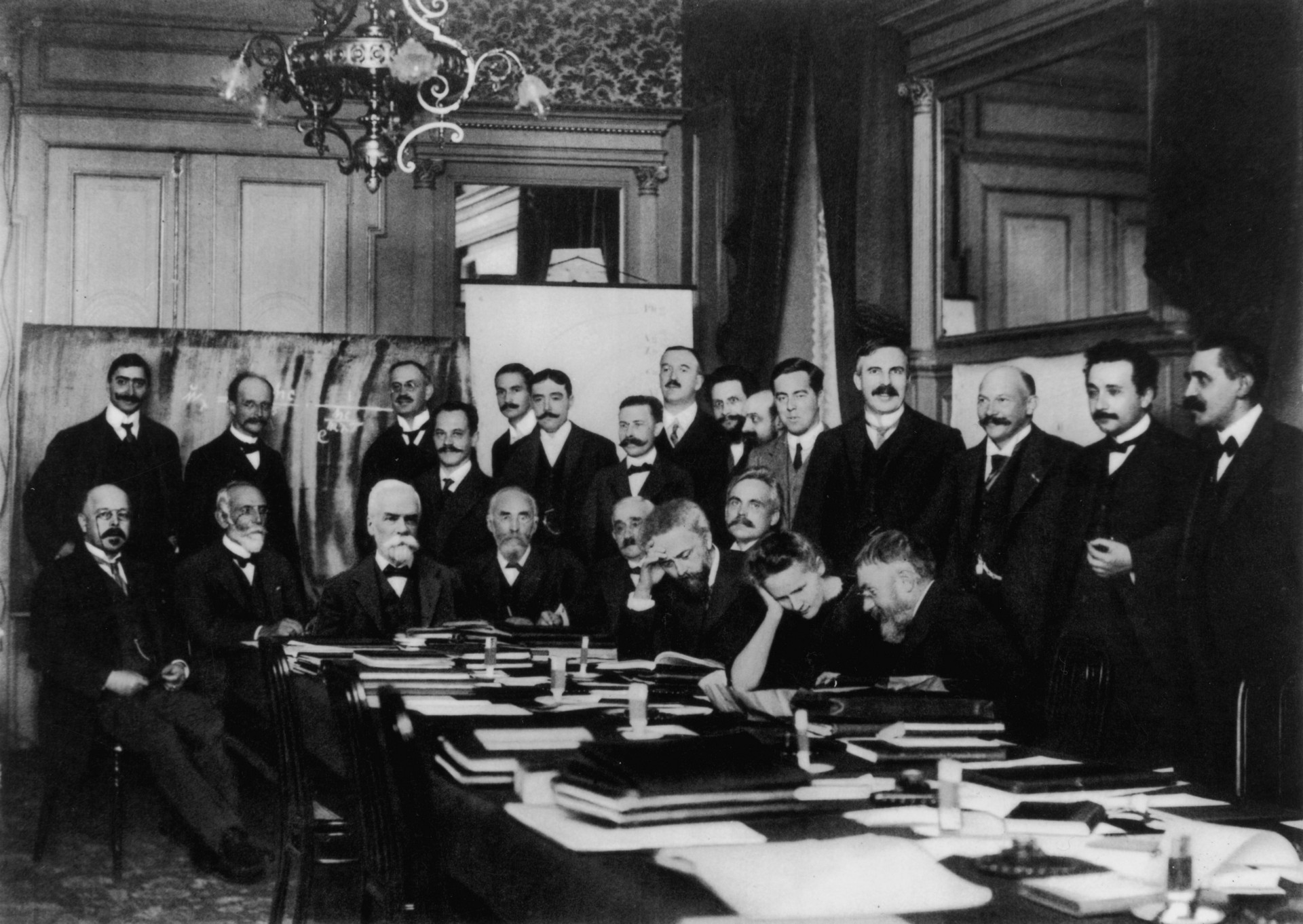
The 1911 Solvay Conference in Brussels was the first world physics conference.

- 1911
  - The Stoclet Palace is built.
  - The North–South connection begins construction.
  - 16–17 April: The Schaerbeek Municipal Hall is partially destroyed by a suspected arson fire.
  - 30 October–3 November: The first Solvay Conference is held.
  - 23 December: The Cercle de la Toison d'Or private club is founded.
- 1912
  - The Young Trade Unionists is established by Joseph Cardijn.
  - At the request of Charles Pathé, the French director Alfred Machin establishes Belgium's first film studio at Karreveld Castle.
  - 14 October: Polish Dominican priest, count, academic and mystic Joachim Badeni is born in the city.
- 1913
  - The Belle-Vue Brewery is established.
  - 14–24 April: The Belgian general strike of 1913 takes place.
  - 5 October: The Sports Palace opens on the edge of Josaphat Park.

== 1914–1918 – First World War ==
- 1914
  - 27 March: Albert Hustin becomes the first person to successfully perform non-direct blood transfusions using sodium citrate as an anticoagulant at the St. John's Clinic.
  - 1 May: Tram line 81 begins service.
  - 11 May–4 June: The Great Zwanz Exhibition is held.
  - 21 August: World War I: The city is captured and occupied by the German Army.
  - 26 August: The city becomes the seat of the Imperial German General Government of Belgium.
  - The Imperial German Air Service establishes Flugplatz Brüssel military airfield in Haren.
  - 29 November: The pro-German Gazet van Brussel starts publication.

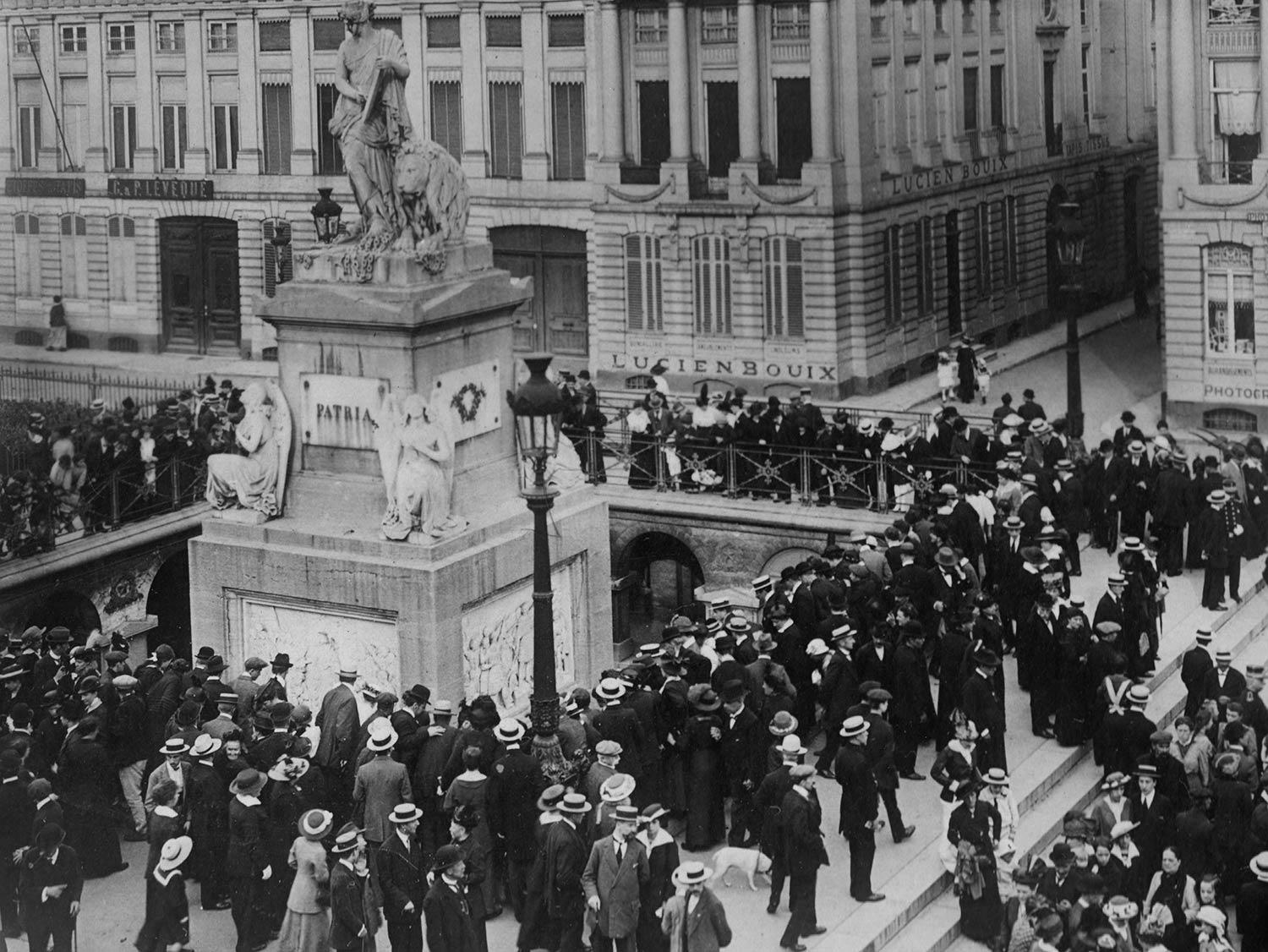
Civilians gather on the Place des Martyrs/Martelaarsplein during the German occupation, 21 July 1915

- 1915
  - 7 June: A Zeppelin hangar on Flugplatz Brüssel is partially destroyed during an attack on airship LZ38.
  - October: René Magritte moves from Charleroi to the city to study at the Royal Academy of Fine Arts.
  - 12 October: Edith Cavell is executed by firing squad at the Tir National/Nationale Schietbaan.
- 1916 – 1 April: Gabrielle Petit is executed by firing squad at the Tir National.
- 1917
  - The Emile Versé Stadium opens.
  - 4 February: The Council of Flanders is established by the "activist" faction of the Flemish Movement, with covert backing from Germany.
- 1918
  - 10 November: The Brussels Soldiers' Council is established by German troops in German-occupied Belgium.
  - 17 November: Adolphe Max returns triumphantly to loud cheers from the city's residents after his time in Germany.
  - 22 November: King Albert I returns to the city.

== 1919–1939 – Interwar period ==
- 1919
  - Population: 685,268 metro.
  - The Lignes Farman airline begins operating its Paris–Brussels route.
  - The New University is reintegrated into the Free University.
  - 15 October: Schaerbeek Municipal School No. 15 opens in Uitkerke to provide schooling for children with health problems.
- 1920
  - The Oscar Bossaert Stadium opens.
  - The Mundaneum opens.
  - 6 July: The University Foundation is established by Herbert Hoover, Emile Francqui and Léon Delacroix.
  - 15–26 August: The fencing events of the 1920 Summer Olympics are held at the Egmont Palace.
  - 20 August: Belga news agency is established by Pierre-Marie Olivier and Maurice Travailleur in Schaerbeek.
  - 28 August–5 September: Some of the football events of the Summer Olympics are held in the Joseph Marien Stadium.
  - 25 September–8 October: The International Financial Conference is held in the city.
- 1921 – 30 March: Haren, Laeken and Neder-Over-Heembeek are annexed by the City of Brussels.
- 1922
  - The Experimental Garden Jean Massart is established.
  - The Karak Soap & Perfumery Works is established.
  - 22 September: Jan Baptist De Mey is reported missing and over the following weeks his dismembered remains are accidentally discovered in the Brussels Canal.
  - 12 November: Tour & Taxis officially opens.
- 1923
  - The Royal Museum of the Armed Forces and Military History opens.
  - Brugmann Hospital opens.
  - Het Heideken social garden city begins development.
  - 1 January: The Vlaamse Club voor Kunsten, Wetenschappen en Letteren is established.
  - 2 January: Tram line 23 begins service.
  - 23 May: The Societé anonyme belge d'Exploitation de la Navigation aérienne (Sabena) is established.
- 1924 – Verregat social garden city begins development.

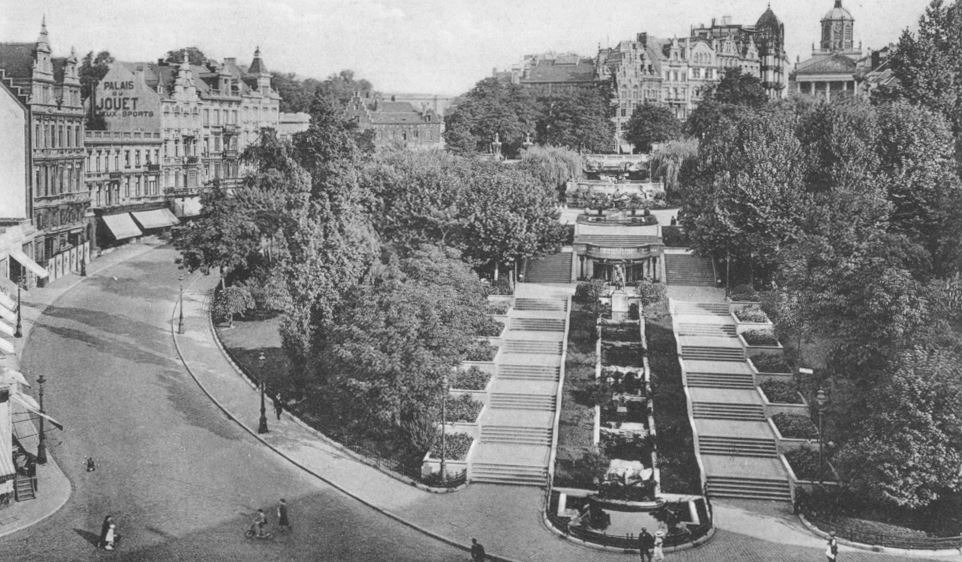
View of the first Mont des Arts/Kunstberg, c. 1925–1930

- 1925 – St Andrew's Church is consecrated.
- 1926
  - The École nationale supérieure des arts visuels de La Cambre (ENSAV) is established.
  - The Comme chez Soi restaurant is established.
- 1927 – 24–29 October: The fifth Solvay Conference, perhaps the most famous, is held.
- 1928
  - The Charlier Museum opens.
  - The Villa van Buuren is built.
  - The first Fernand Jacobs Award is presented to Louis Crooy and Victor Groenen in honour of Fernand Jacobs.
- 1929
  - 4 January: Tintin first appears in Le Petit Vingtième newspaper.
  - 19 October: The Centre for Fine Arts opens.
- 1930
  - Population: 200,433 city.
  - The Hotel Le Plaza opens.
  - The Church of Our Lady of Victories at the Sablon becomes the Belgian lieutenancy of the Equestrian Order of the Holy Sepulchre of Jerusalem.
  - The Natan fashion house is established.
  - 18 June: The National Institute for Radio Broadcast (NIR) is established.
  - 23 August: The Jubilee Stadium opens.
  - 6 December: Casal Català de Brussel·les is founded by a group of Catalan exiled politicians including Francesc Macià i Llussà and Bonaventura Gassol i Rovira.
- 1931
  - The Brussels Symphony Orchestra is founded.
  - The Granvelle Palace is demolished.
- 1932 – 7 October: The Luna-Theater opens on the site of a former luna park.
- 1933
  - The Uccle Crematorium opens, becoming the first crematorium in Belgium.
  - 6 April: The Synagogue of Anderlecht is consecrated.
  - 8 March: The Vlaamsch Verbond voor Brussel is established.
- 1934
  - The Villa Empain is built.
  - The Citroën Garage is built.
  - 22 February: The funeral of King Albert I takes place.
  - 23 February: King Leopold III takes the constitutional oath at the Palace of the Nation.

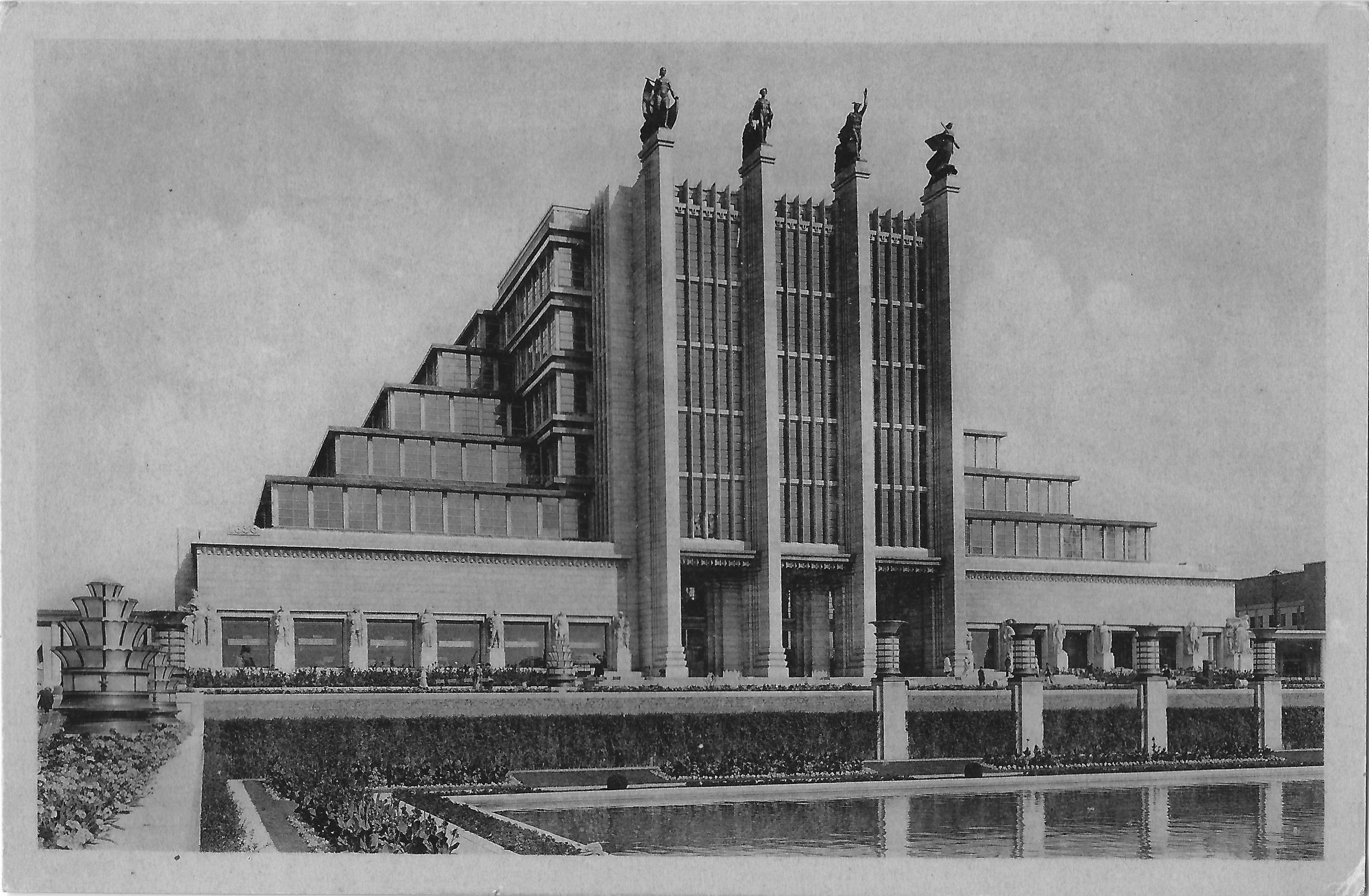
The Palais des Expositions during the 1935 Brussels World's Fair

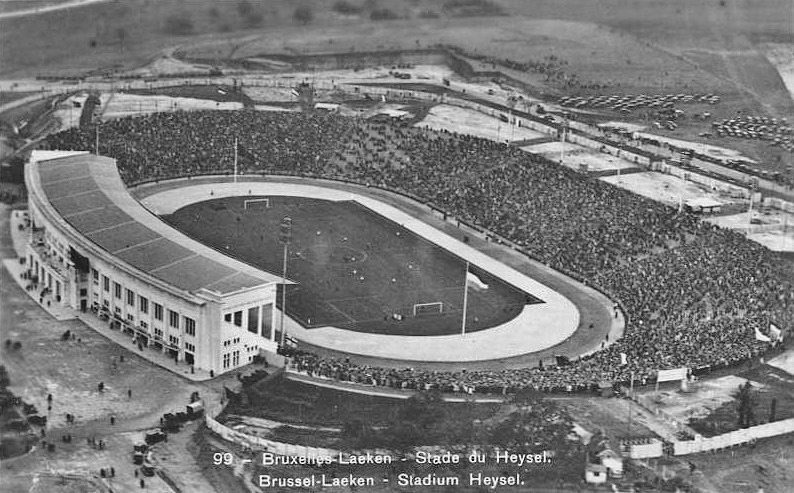
View of the Jubilee Stadium, 1935

- 1935
  - The Brussels International world's fair is held; the Palais des Expositions is built.
  - The Basilica of the Sacred Heart is consecrated.
  - The Groot Symfonie-Orkest is established.
  - The Société royale de Flore de Bruxelles and Société royale linnéenne de Bruxelles merge and form the Société royale linnéenne et de Flore de Bruxelles.
- 1937
  - King Leopold III commissions the world's first six-metre-high concrete climbing wall, built in the garden of the Château of Stuyvenberg.
  - The Résidence de la Cambre, the city's first high-rise, is constructed.
  - 21 March–1 April: The first Eugène Ysaÿe Competition is held.
- 1938
  - The Forest Municipal Hall is built.
  - The Flagey Building is built.
  - Suikerbakkerij Joris is established.
  - 28 February: Bossemans et Coppenolle is first performed at the Théâtre du Vaudeville.
  - 9 April: The Royal Belgian Film Archive is established by André Thirifays, Henri Storck and Piet Vermeylen.
- 1939
  - The Constantin Meunier Museum opens.
  - 21 June: The Institut Jules Bordet is inaugurated.
  - September: Construction of the K-W Line begins to defend the city from invasions.
  - 28 November: Joseph Van De Meulebroeck is appointed mayor by royal decree.

== 1940–1945 – Second World War ==
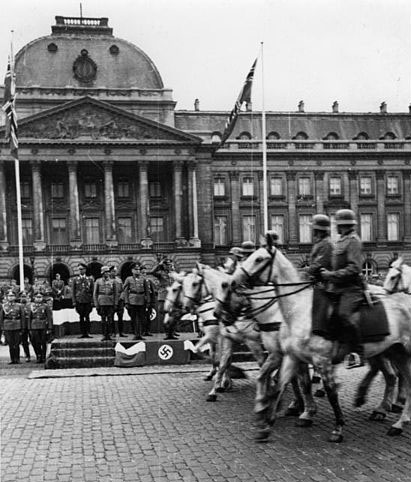
German soldiers parade past the Royal Palace of Brussels, May 1940

- 1940
  - 10 May: The Third Reich launches a surprise attack, air raid sirens ring in the city, and bombs hit Woluwe-Saint-Pierre, Etterbeek, Evere, and Schaerbeek.
  - 11 May: Bombs are dropped in the vicinity of the North and South stations and Schaerbeek.
  - 12 May: The city is mostly deserted, with only a few trams running, schools closed, and many residents fleeing south and west.
  - 16 May: British troops move east across the city and return when the bridges over the Willebroek and Brussels-Charleroi canals are blown up.
  - 17 May: The German occupation begins as the city is declared open, and the Sixth Army, under General Walter von Reichenau, enters, while the Belgian Government flees to Bordeaux.
  - 28 May: The Belgian Army surrenders, and King Leopold III is taken prisoner of war at the Palace of Laeken.
  - 31 May: The German Military Administration in Belgium and Northern France is headquartered in the city.
  - 1 June: Adolf Hitler visits the city.
  - 1 July: The Zéro intelligence network in formed by employees of the Bank of Brussels.
  - 20 July: The Frontstalag 110 prisoner-of-war camp is established by the Wehrmacht.
  - 31 July: The Radio Bruxelles and Zender Brussel radio stations are established by the Military Administration.
  - 15 August: La Libre Belgique clandestine newspaper begins its publication.
  - 18–19 August: English bombs hit the Rue Antoine Dansaert/Antoine Dansaertstraat, killing seven.
  - 11 November: A demonstration at the Tomb of the Unknown Soldier is broken up.
  - 17 December: The Belgian National Movement is established.
- 1941
  - 1 February: Le Drapeau Rouge and De Roode Vaan clandestine newspapers begin their publication by the Communist Party of Belgium.
  - 13 March: The Frontstalag 110 POW camp is dissolved.
  - 29 May: The 'Hunger march for the release of prisoners of war', 3,000 women rally behind slogans and march through the city.
  - June: A passenger train derails in Uccle after a failed sabotage attempt by the Belgian National Movement of a tank transport from Charleroi on line 154.
  - 30 June: Joseph Van De Meulebroeck is arrested and deported; Jules Coelst is designated deputy mayor.
  - 18 August: The Comet Line starts operating.
  - 10 October: Bombing of the Rex headquarters on the Rue de Laeken/Lakensestraat; Jean-Joseph Oedekerken is killed.
  - 25 November: The Free University of Brussels closes.
- 1942
  - January: Groupe G is formed by a group of former students of the Free University.
  - 10 March: Violence erupts in the city during a parade of the Walloon Legion before leaving for the Eastern Front, marked by bombings and attacks from communist militants against collaborators and military targets.
  - 3 September: A razzia occurs in the Marolles, 718 are arrested and transported to Dossin.
  - 24 September: Greater Brussels is formed by merging 18 municipalities into the City of Brussels; Jan Grauls is appointed mayor.
- 1943
  - 2 January: Following several attacks on Germans, sanctions are imposed as theatres and concert halls close, sports matches are cancelled and night trams stop running.
  - 20 January: An attack on the Gestapo headquarters by Baron Jean de Selys Longchamps takes place.
  - 29 January: The sanctions imposed earlier that month are lifted.
  - 14 April: Paul Colin is assassinated by Arnaud Fraiteur.
  - 19 April: Youra Livchitz, Robert Maistriau, and Jean Franklemon cycle from the city to Boortmeerbeek to liberate passengers from the XXth convoy to Auschwitz.
  - 27 April: A failed assassination attempt by Youra Livchitz on Icek Glogowski, occurs at his residence on the Rue Vanderkindere/Vanderkinderestraat when Livchitz's pistol jammed. After the attempt, Glogowski was transported daily by the Gestapo.
  - 26 March: Author and municipal clerk of Molenbeek-Saint-Jean Jef Mennekens is assassinated outside his home by a hitman.
  - 7 September: The city is bombarded by the Allies, killing 342.
  - 20 October: Eleven members of the Comet Line are executed at the Tir National.

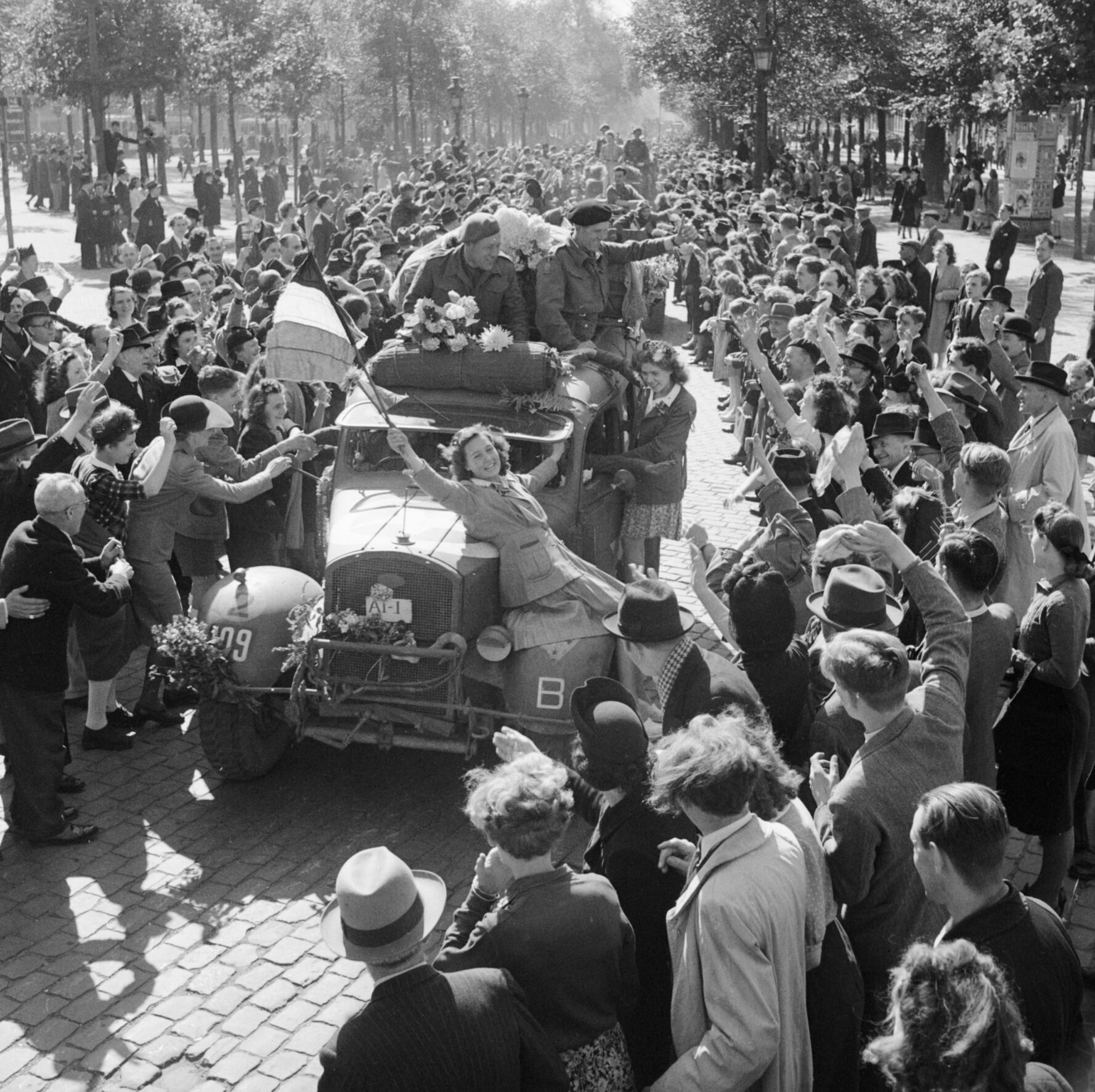
Scenes of jubilation as British troops liberate Brussels, 4 September 1944

- 1944
  - 17 February: Youra Livchitz is executed by firing squad at the Tir National.
  - 28 February: Alexandre Galopin is assassinated by Flemish collaborators from DeVlag.
  - 10 April: Bombings occur.
  - 2–11 May: Bombings occur.
  - 1 August: Attacks in the city against the Germans and collaborators take place; they retaliate and execute 30 people.
  - 23 August: 15 people are executed by the Germans.
  - 3–4 September: The city is liberated by the Welsh Guards; the Palace of Justice is burnt by the Germans to destroy legal records during their retreat.
  - 8 September: The Belgian government in exile returns to the city after four years in London.
  - 20 September: Prince Charles, Count of Flanders takes the constitutional oath at the Palace of the Nation, and becomes regent.
  - 20 November: The Free University reopens.
  - 15 December: The District of Brussels, formed by Nazi Germany, is no longer in control of the territory.
- 1945
  - 10 June: A mock funeral procession for Adolf Hitler is held in the Marolles, during which funds were raised to support the victims of Auschwitz.
  - 29 June: General Dwight D. Eisenhower becomes the first Honorary Citizen of the City of Brussels.

== 1946–1979 – Post-war era ==
- 1946
  - 18 June: The Société Commerciale Anglo Belgo Allemande Luxembourgeoise is founded by Otto Hertz.
  - 26 September: Tintin comics magazine starts publication by Le Lombard.
- 1947 – 24 November: A fire erupts at the Ministry of Education building, killing 17 and injuring 40.

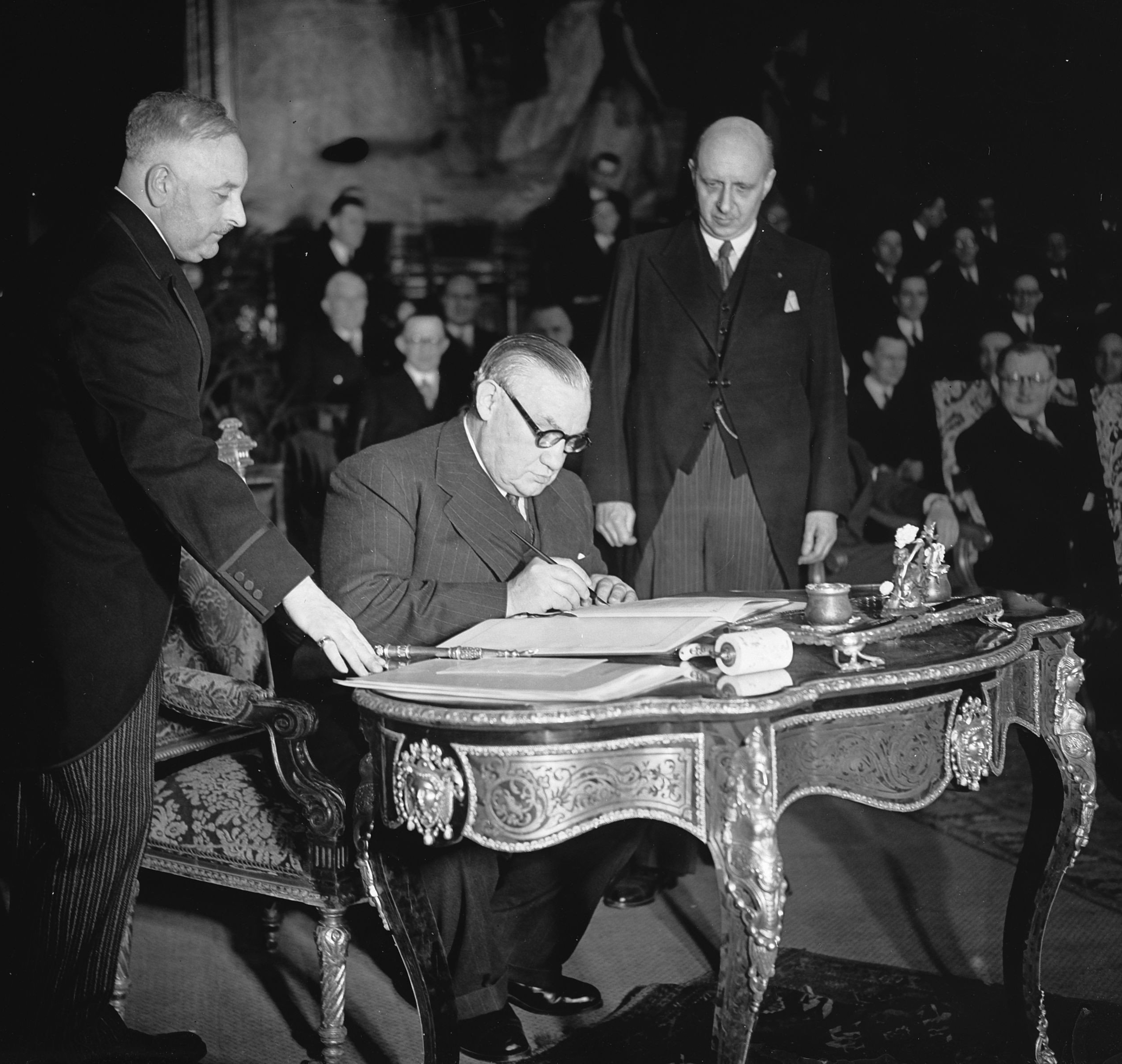
British Foreign Secretary Ernest Bevin signing the Treaty of Brussels, 17 March 1948

- 1948
  - 17 March: The Treaty of Brussels is signed, establishing the Western Union (WU).
  - 20 July: Brussels Airport opens in Zaventem.
  - 1 September: The foundation stone is laid for the Volkswagen Forest/Vorst car manufacturing plant by D'Ieteren.
- 1949
  - The Black Russian is created by Gustave Tops, a bartender at the Hotel Métropole, in honour of Perle Mesta, the U.S. ambassador to Luxembourg.
  - 22 May: The Brussels Grand Prix is first held.
- 1950
  - 1 August: King Leopold III asks the Government and Parliament to vote on a law delegating his powers to Prince Baudouin, Duke of Brabant.
  - 11 August: Prince Baudouin takes the constitutional oath for the first time and becomes the Prince Royal.
  - 1 October: St. Job's Church is consecrated.
- 1951
  - 13 March: The Cercle artistique et littéraire de Bruxelles is integrated into the Cercle royal Gaulois to become the Cercle royal Gaulois artistique et littéraire.
  - 17 July: King Baudouin takes the constitutional oath for the second time at the Palace of the Nation, and becomes the King of the Belgians.
- 1952
  - The North–South connection is completed; Brussels-Central railway station and Brussels-South railway station open.
  - Café du Heideken is demolished to widen the Avenue de Jette/Jetselaan for tram line 13.
- 1953
  - Suzan Daniel establishes the Centre culturel de Belgique/Cultuurcentrum België (CCB) the first LGBTQIA+ rights organisation in the country.
  - 17 June: Transports Intercommunaux de Bruxelles is formed, replacing Les Tramways Bruxellois as the city's main public transport operator.
  - 1 August: The Brussels Heliport commences operations under Sabena.
  - 15–19 August: The 7th Summer Deaflympics are held in the city.
- 1955
  - 26 March: A mass demonstration takes place against a Socialist–Liberal education bill, while authorities downplay the event through limited media coverage, 40 injurded.
  - 25 May: The Royal Flemish Theatre suffers extensive damage from a fire.
  - 10 July: Over a quarter of a million demonstrate in the city against Socialist–Liberal education policy.
- 1956
  - The Atomium starts construction.
  - 14 February: Lucien Cooremans is appointed mayor by royal decree.
- 1957 – Delhaize inaugurates the first supermarket on the European continent at the Place Eugène Flagey/Eugène Flageyplein.

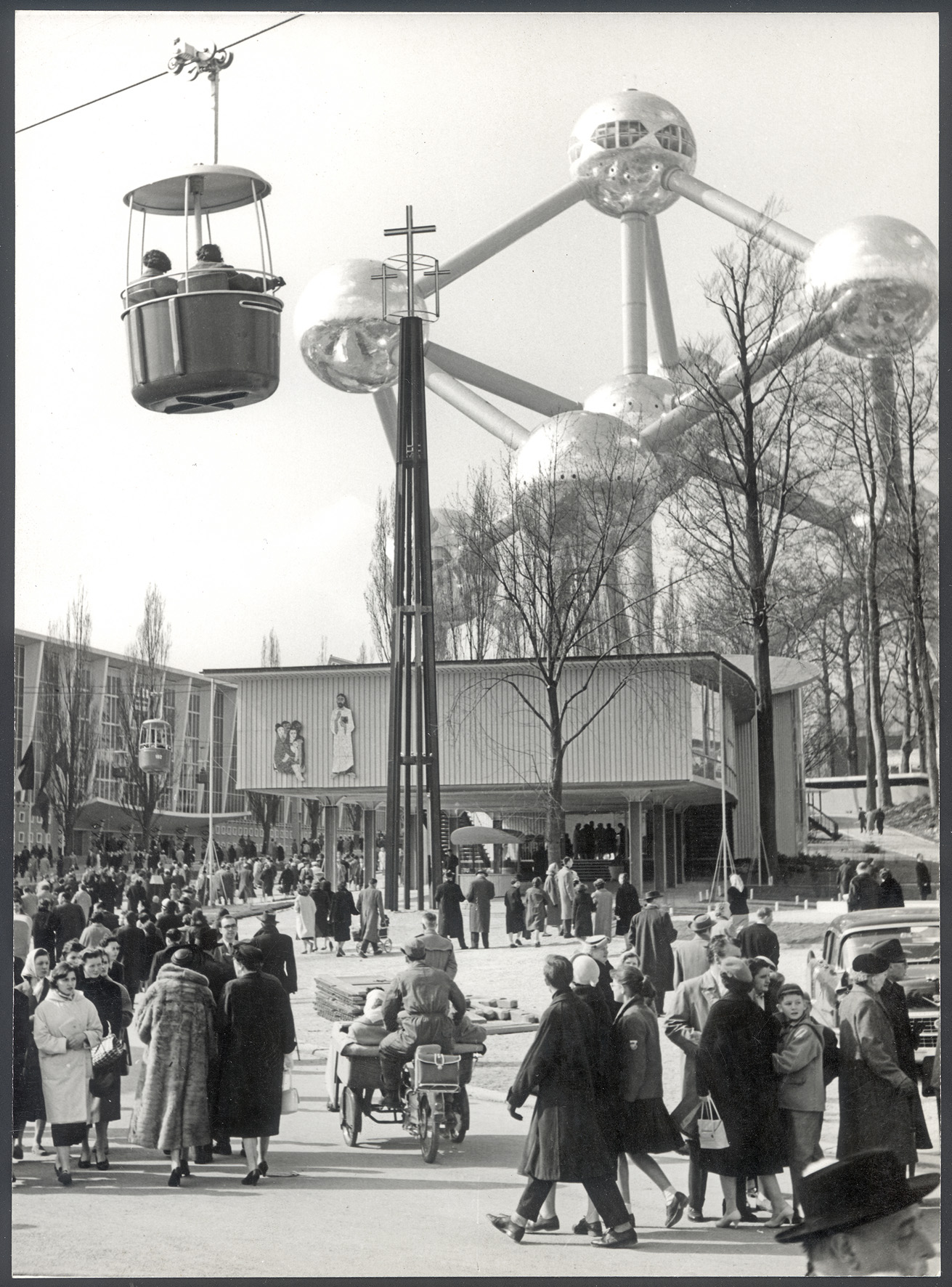
The Atomium and cable car during the 1958 Brussels World's Fair (Expo 58)

- 1958
  - The city becomes one of the seats of the European Community.
  - The Pro-Cathedral of the Holy Trinity is consecrated.
  - 17 April–19 October: Expo 58 world's fair is held.
  - September – The European School, Brussels I (ESB1) opens.
- 1959
  - The State Administrative Centre begins construction.
  - 2 July: The wedding of Prince Albert and Paola Ruffo di Calabria takes place.

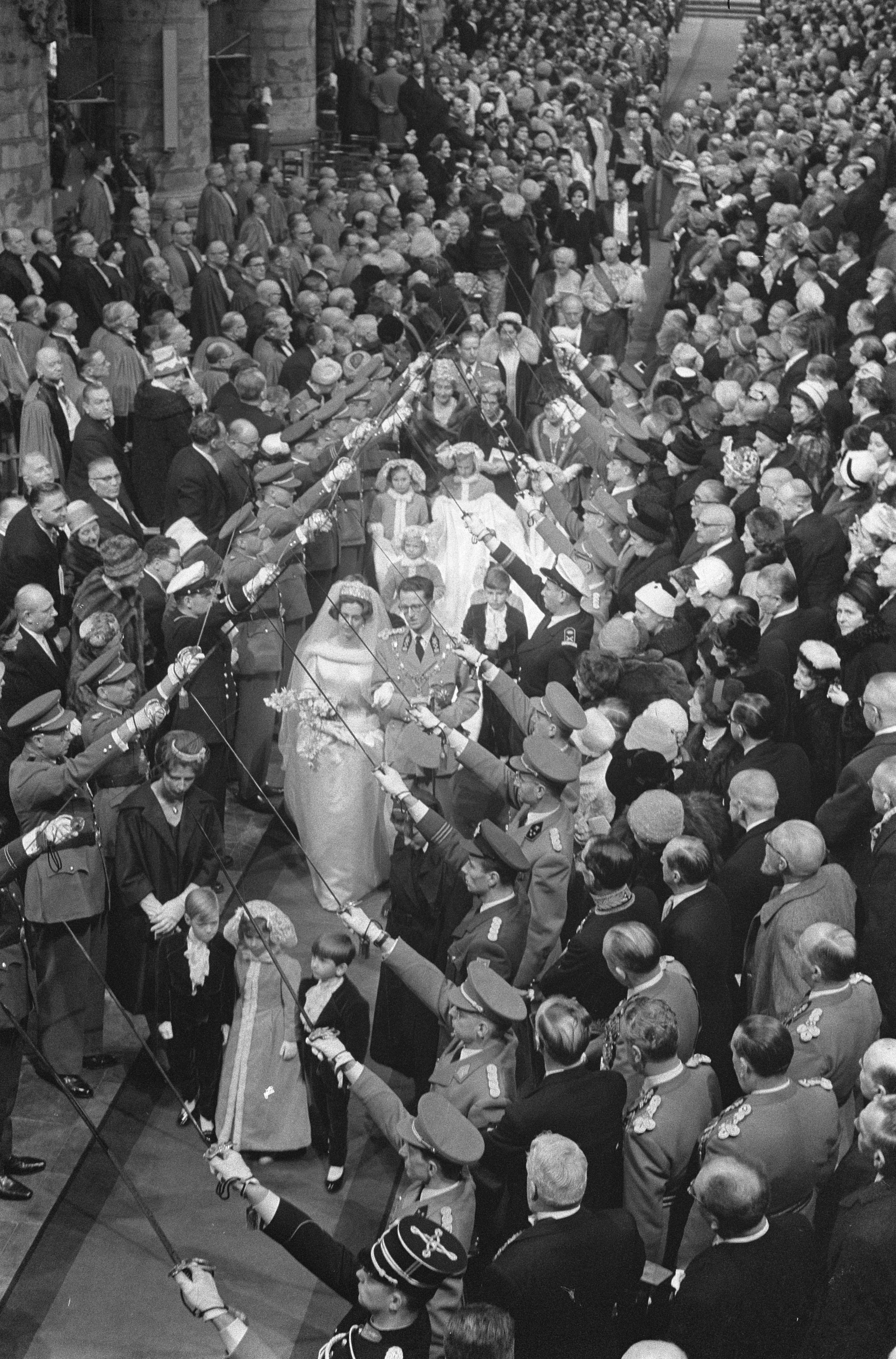
King Baudouin and Doña Fabiola exit the church following their wedding ceremony, 15 December 1960

- 1960
  - The city hosts the Congolese Round Table Conference.
  - Ballet of the 20th Century contemporary dance company is established.
  - 3 April: The weekly Sablon Antiques Market is inaugurated by Mayor Lucien Cooremans.
  - 30 July–6 August: The 45th World Esperanto Congress takes place in the city.
  - 1 November: The city becomes the seat of the Secretariat-General of the Benelux.
  - 15 December: The wedding of King Baudouin and Fabiola de Mora y Aragón takes place.
- 1961
  - The Serment royal des Saints-Michel-et-Gudule ou des Escrimeurs de Bruxelles is reestablished as La Maison de l'Escrime by Charles Debeur.
  - 15 February: Sabena Flight 548 crashes on approach to Brussels Airport, killing all 72 people on board and one person on the ground.
  - 27 February: The Royal Association of the Descendants of the Lineages of Brussels is established.
  - 22 October: The first March on Brussels against Francisation is held.
  - 8 December: The Archdiocese of Mechelen is renamed the Archdiocese of Mechelen–Brussels, with the Cathedral of St. Michael and St. Gudula becoming its co-cathedral, and Leo Joseph Suenens becoming the first archbishop.
  - 21 December: The Film Museum is founded.
- 1962
  - The Hoger Rijks Instituut voor Toneel en Cultuurspreiding (HRITCS) is established.
  - The Institut national supérieur des arts du spectacle et des techniques de diffusion (INSAS) is established.
  - The Vicariate of Brussels is established.
  - 17 September: The Statistics Belgium building collapses, killing 17 and injuring 19.
  - 14 October: The second March on Brussels against Francisation is held.

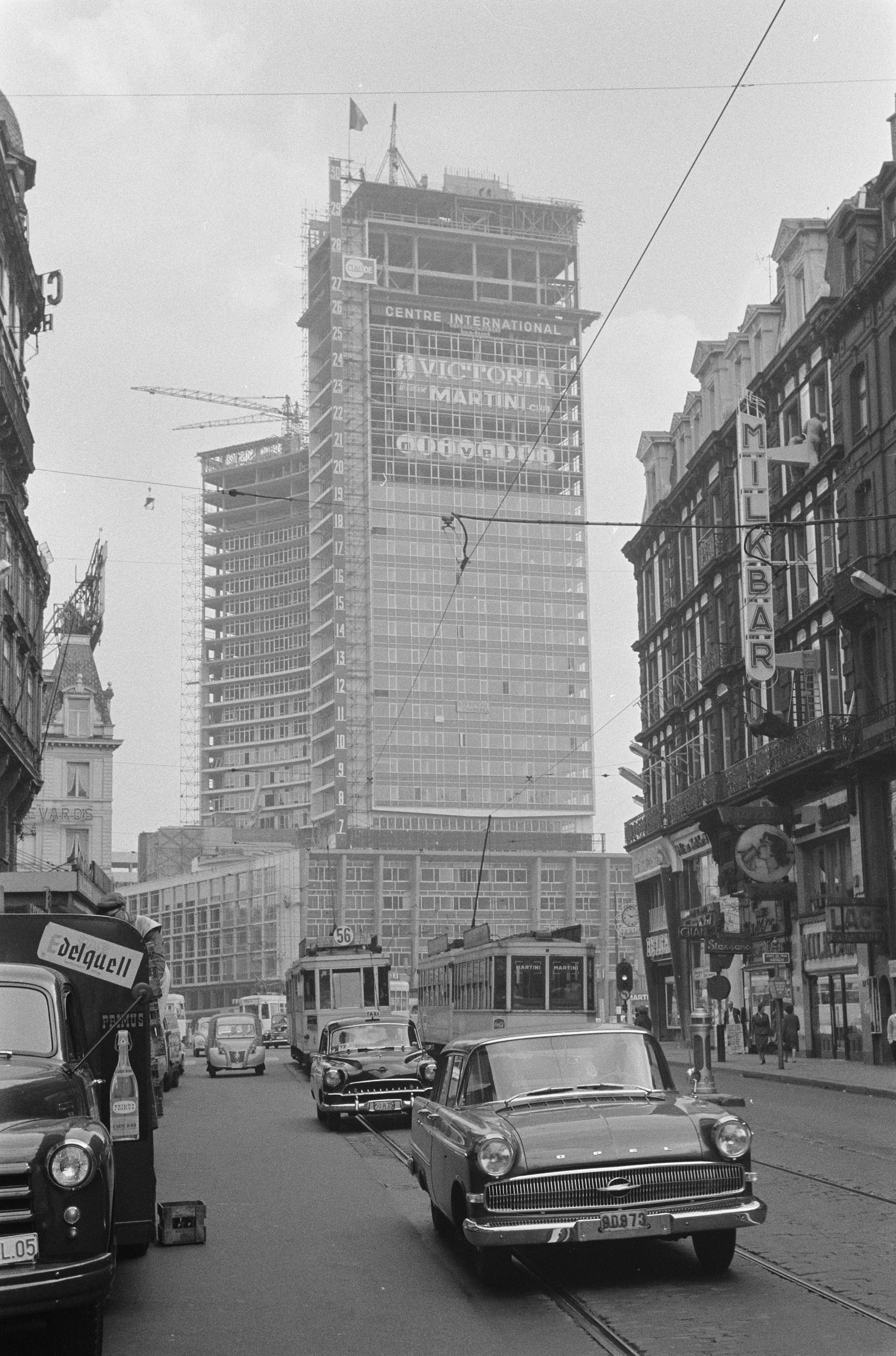
Construction of the Rogier International Centre, 18 March 1963

- 1963 – 2 August: The city becomes part of the bilingual Brussels-Capital administrative area.
- 1965
  - The Maison du Peuple/Volkshuis is demolished and is replaced with the Sablon Tower.
  - 24 February: A fire erupts at the Gai Séjour nursing home, killing 15 and injuring 10.
- 1966
  - The Sports Palace is demolished and replaced by Brusilia.
  - Schaerbeek Municipal School No. 15 closes due to outdated facilities and a declining need for seaside air among pupils.
  - 1 November: The Brussels Heliport ceases operations.
- 1967
  - The South Tower is built.
  - 17 February: The Manhattan Plan, is approved by Prime Minister Paul Vanden Boeynants, paving the way for the construction of the Northern Quarter.
  - 1 May: The European Commission starts moving into the Berlaymont.
  - 22 May: The À L'Innovation department store is destroyed by fire.
  - 16 October: NATO's headquarters are established in the city.
  - 13 December: The Study and Documentation Centre for War and Contemporary Society (Cegesoma) is established.
- 1968
  - 9 January: Tram line 19 begins service.
  - 19 April: Tram line 44 begins service.
  - 16 April: Tram line 39 begins service.
  - May: Student demonstrations take place at the Free University.
  - 6 July: Tram line 55 begins service.
  - September: Jan-van-Ruusbroeckollege opens in Laeken.
- 1969
  - The Brussels Hilton opens.
  - The current Mont des Arts/Kunstberg is inaugurated.
  - 29–30 June: The Tour de France passes through the city.
  - 8 September: The El Al airline offices are bombed.
  - 13 September: The Battle of the Marolles takes place.
  - 1 October: The Free University splits along linguistic lines into the Université libre de Bruxelles (ULB) and Vrije Universiteit Brussel (VUB).
  - 17 December: King Baudouin opens the premetro between Schuman and De Brouckère.

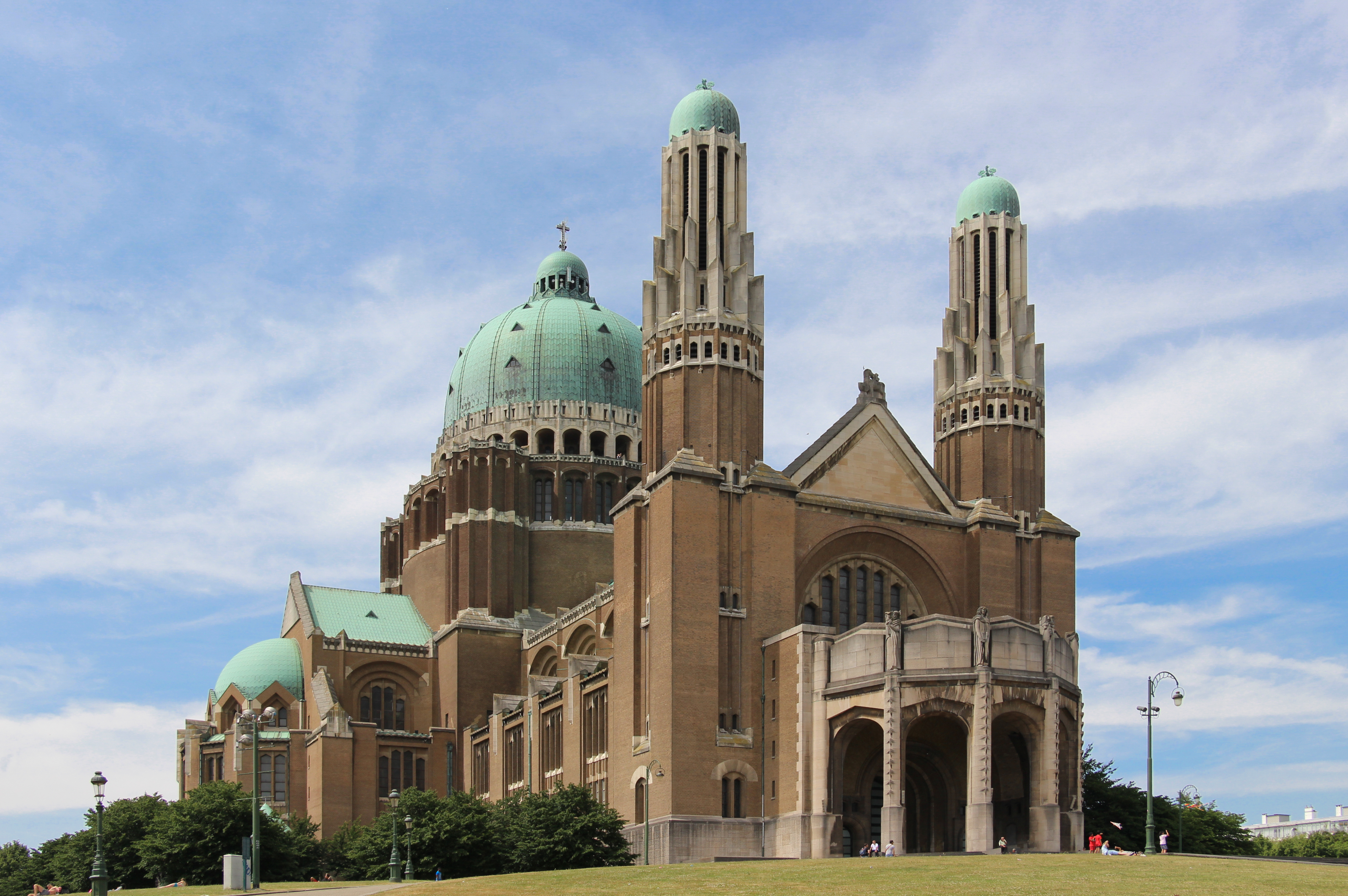
The National Basilica of the Sacred Heart, completed in 1970

- 1970
  - The Royale Belge is built.
  - 30 April: The Mudra modern dance school is established by Maurice Béjart.
  - 12 September: Jacques Georgin is attacked by members of the Order of Flemish Militants while pasting election posters in Laeken and later dies of a heart attack.
  - 8 October: Forest National/Vorst Nationaal opens.
  - 11 November: The Basilica of the Sacred Heart is completed.
- 1971
  - The Flower Carpet begins at the Grand-Place.
  - 7 May: The Bulletin initiates a petition calling for a car-free Grand-Place, signed by many locals, including Jacques Brel, followed by a picnic protest, blocking car access to the square. Months later, the mayor yields.
  - 26 July: The Brussels Agglomeration is created.
  - 1 September: Mayor Roger Nols of Schaerbeek sets up separate counters in the Town Hall, violating the Language Law on Administrative Affairs requiring bilingual municipal officials.
  - 25 November: The first and only elections of the Brussels Agglomeration Council are held.
- 1972 – La Villa Lorraine becomes the first restaurant outside France to earn a Michelin star.

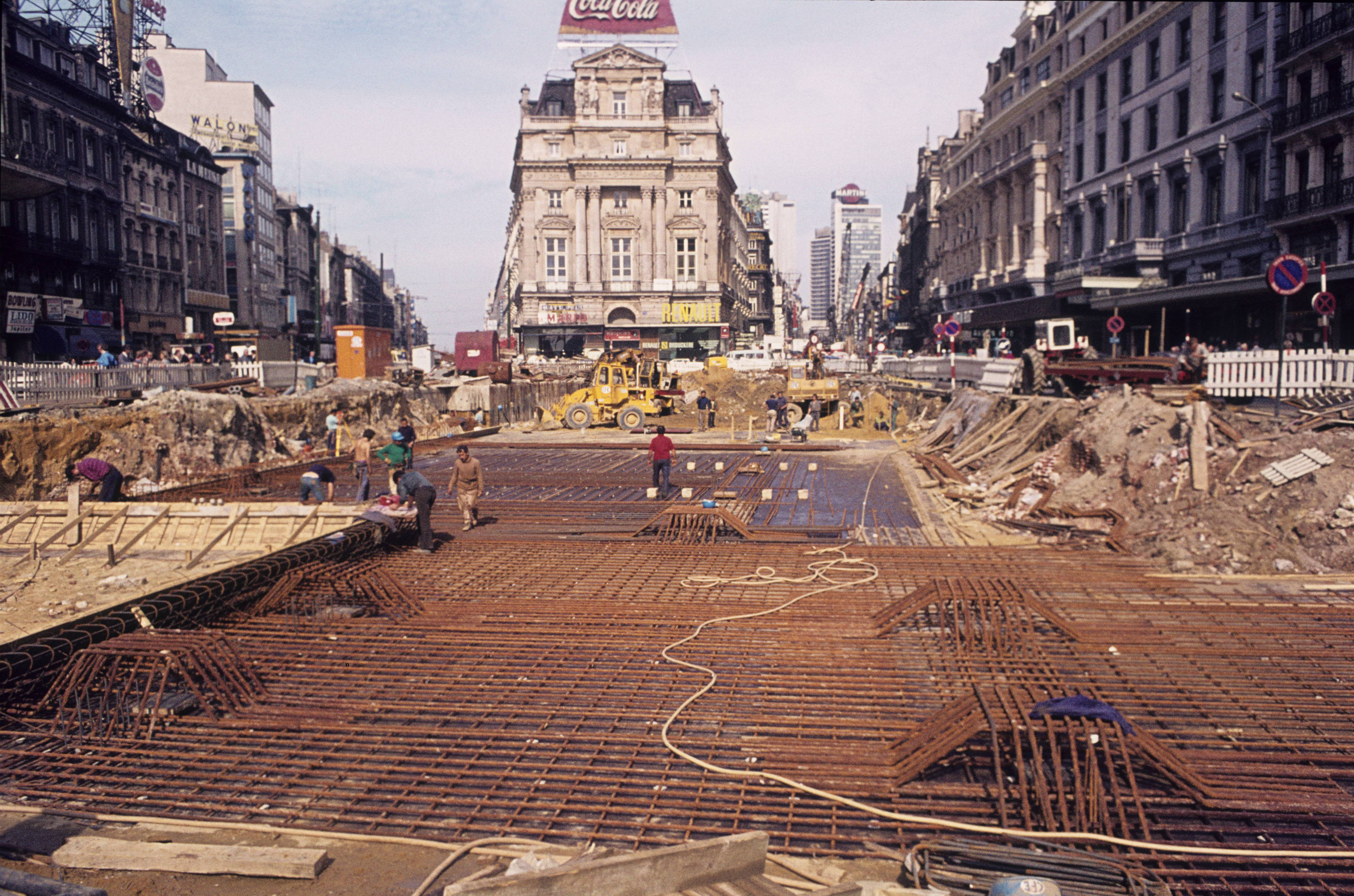
Construction of the Brussels Metro at the Place de Brouckère/De Brouckèreplein, 1974

- 1974
  - The first Brussels Independent Film Festival is held.
  - January: The first Brussels International Film Festival is held.
- 1975
  - The Université catholique de Louvain's Jardin des plantes médicinales Paul Moens is established.
  - Trademart Brussels is established.
  - March: Bruneau restaurant is opened by the chef Jean-Pierre Bruneau.
  - 1 January: The Fire Brigade merges with four surrounding brigades as part of a restructuring effort following the À L'Innovation department store fire.
  - 14 May: Jeanne Dielman, 23 quai du Commerce, 1080 Bruxelles is released by Chantal Akerman during the 28th Cannes Film Festival.
  - 26 April: The first Congress of Brussels Flemings takes place to prepare for the creation of the Brussels-Capital Region.
  - 24 July–2 August: Eurofest '75, an International Youth Conference and Evangelistic Campaign, is organised by the Billy Graham Organisation.
  - 30 July: Bank Brussels Lambert is established.
  - 30 August: Pierre Van Halteren is elected mayor.
- 1976
  - April: Manneken Pis and Mietje Stroel are symbolically engaged in a ceremony at the Town Hall.
  - 23 August: The Saint Luke's University Hospitals of the University of Louvain opens in Louvain-en-Woluwe.
  - 20 September: The Brussels Metro begins operating.
  - 28 September: The Brussels Planetarium opens.
- 1977
  - The first Memorial Van Damme is organised by a group of journalists in honour of Ivo Van Damme in the Heysel Stadium.
  - The VUB Academic Hospital (AZ-VUB) of the VUB opens in Jette.
  - 21 May: A fire erupts at the Hôtel des Ducs de Brabant, killing 19.
  - 20 September: The Archief en Museum van het Vlaams leven te Brussel is established.
  - October: The Erasmus Hospital of the ULB opens in Neerpede.
- 1978
  - The Brussels Ring is constructed.
  - The RTBF Symphony Orchestra is formed.
  - The Oriental Pavilion is transformed into the Great Mosque of Brussels.
  - 9 November: Radio Brol, the city's first pirate radio, is launched by ULB students to support protests like the one against rising registration fees.
- 1979
  - The Archives of the City of Brussels moves into the former Magasins Waucquez.
  - The city celebrates the 1,000th anniversary of its founding.
  - Au Stekerlapatte restaurant is established by the Flemish radio and television presenter Daniël Van Avermaet.
  - 9 January: Radio Activités is launched by Coordination Anti-Nucleaire de Bruxelles in association with Les Amis de la Terre-Bruxelles becomes the first pirate station with regular broadcasts.
  - 28 August: The Brussels bombing occurs, injuring 18.
  - 19 December: Godfried Danneels is appointed Archbishop of Mechelen–Brussels.

== 1980–2000 ==
- 1980
  - Population of the Brussels-Capital Region: 1,008,715.
  - The Flemish Community and the French Community of Belgium each designate Brussels as their capital city.
  - 9 February: The bilingual Radio Contact is launched.
  - 4 December: A French-Algerian man is killed by members of the Front de la Jeunesse, sparking a massive anti-racist demonstration; Justice Minister Philippe Moureaux introduces a law against racism in Parliament, which is adopted a few months later.
- 1981
  - 21 March: King Baudouin Park is laid out.
  - 1 April: Studio Brussel is established as a regional radio station of the BRT.
  - 1 July: Palestine Liberation Organization (PLO) representative Naïm Khader is assassinated in the early hours in front of his home in Ixelles.
  - 18 July: Lawyer and diplomat Fernand Spaak is shot dead in his flat with a hunting rifle by his estranged wife, Anna-Maria Farina.
  - 4 December: The Bibliotheca Wittockiana is founded by Michel Wittock.
  - 31 December: A burglary by the Brabant Killers at the Gendarmerie barracks in Etterbeek stealing weapons, ammunition, and a car, some of which were allegedly found later in Madani Bouhouche's garage.

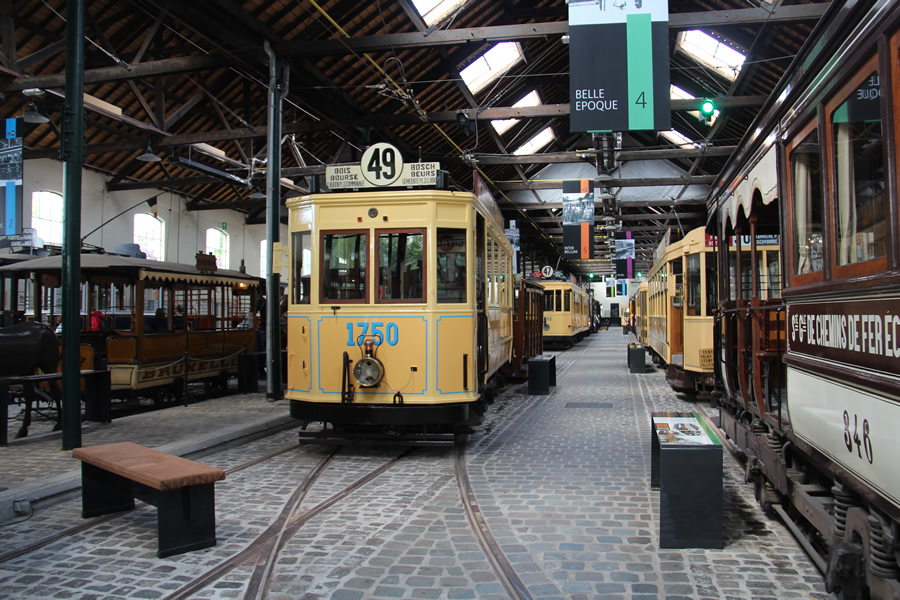
Interior of the Brussels Urban Transport Museum, opened in 1982

- 1982 – 18 March: The Brussels Urban Transport Museum is established.
- 1983
  - First Brussels International Festival of Fantastic Film (BIFF) is held.
  - 9 January: Robbery and murder of Greek-born taxi driver Constantin Angelou by the Brabant Killers. The car and body are later found in Mons.
  - 28 January: Raymond Dewee's Peugeot 504, along with his ID and driving licence, are stolen at gunpoint in Watermael-Boitsfort. Two weeks later, the car is used in an armed robbery at a Genval Delhaize, linked to the Brabant Killers.
  - 25 February: The Brabant Killers carry out an armed robbery at a Delhaize in Fort Jaco, stealing less than 600,000 BEF with no fatalities.
  - 4 March: Hervé Brouhon is elected mayor.
  - 17 May: La Fonderie, Brussels Museum of Industry and Labour, is established.
  - 14 July: Turkish administrative attaché Dursun Aksoy is assassinated near his home on the Avenue Franklin Roosevelt/Franklin Rooseveltlaan.
  - 23 October: The Peace March occurs, with over 400,000 participants, protesting the NATO plan to place nuclear weapons at Kleine-Brogel and Florennes under the Double-Track Decision.
- 1984
  - 13 February: The body of Christine Van Hees is discovered in an abandoned mushroom farm in Auderghem.
  - 15 February: The Brussels Regional Investment Company is established.
  - 7 September: The Bar Association of Brussels is split into French-speaking and Dutch-speaking orders.
  - 30 September: The Brussels Marathon is first held.
  - 2–8 October: The Cellules Communistes Combattantes (CCC) carry out three attacks against companies cooperating with NATO, resulting in minimal damage.
  - 15 October: Attack on the liberal Paul Hymans Institute in Ixelles by the CCC.
- 1985
  - 15 January: The CCC attacks a NATO/SHAPE support group in Woluwe-Saint-Lambert.
  - 1 May: The CCC attacks the Federation of Belgian Enterprises offices on the Rue des Sols/Stuiversstraat, killing two firefighters and injuring 13 others.
  - 6 May: The CCC carries out an attack against a Gendarmerie building, blaming them for the death of the two firefighters on 1 May.
  - 16 May: Pope John Paul II visits the city.
  - 29 May: The Heysel Stadium disaster takes place.
  - 8 October: The CCC attacks the headquarters of electricity producer Intercom.
  - 4 November: The CCC attacks the bank BBL in Etterbeek.
  - 21 November: During Ronald Reagan's visit to NATO headquarters in Evere, a bomb explodes in an office building targeting Motorola for its cooperation with the military.
  - 14 December: The French-language television station Télé Bruxelles is established.
- 1986
  - 29 September: Autoworld opens.
  - 8 December: The Flemish private club De Warande is founded and establishes itself in the Hôtel Empain.

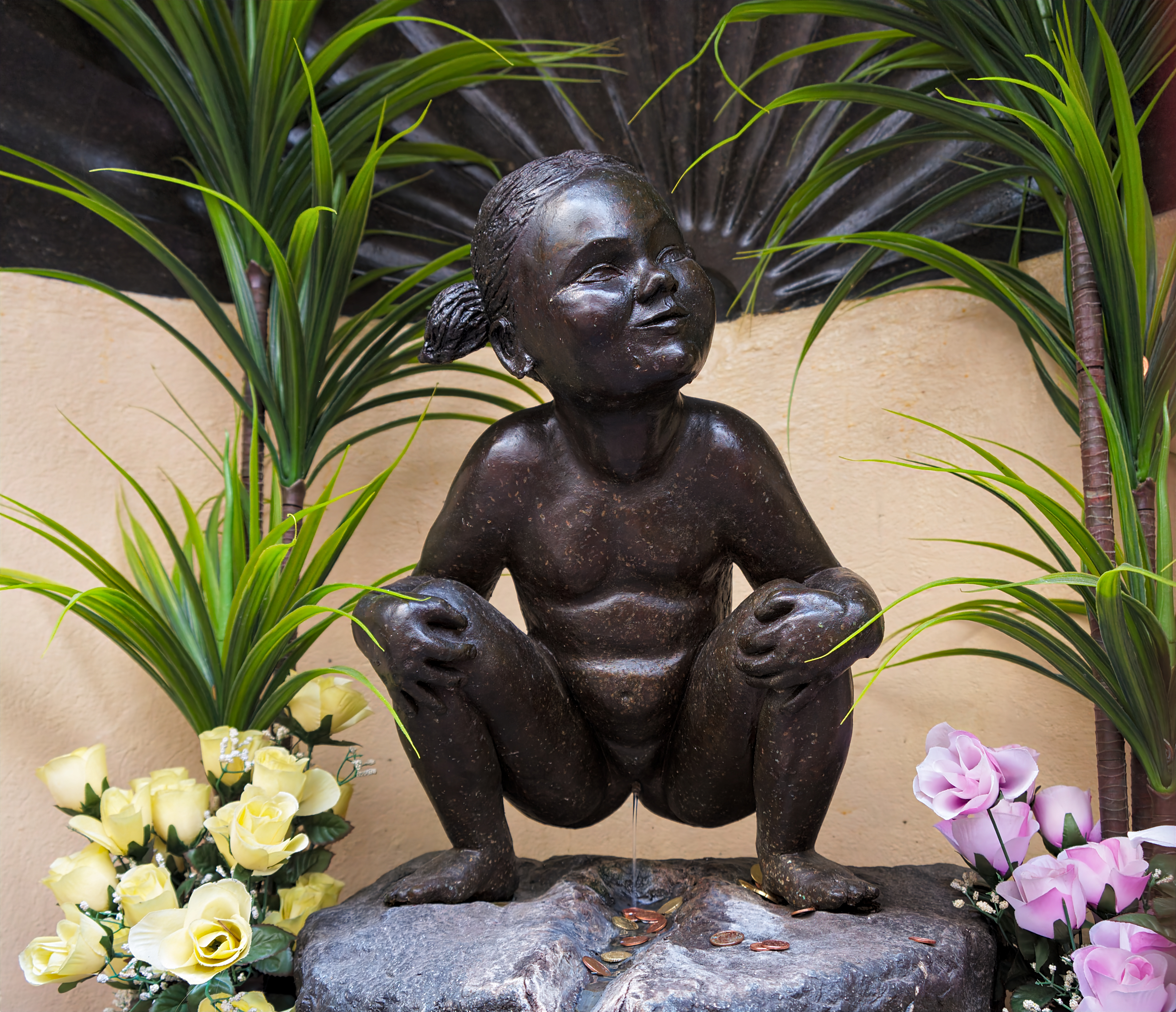
Jeanneke Pis, completed in 1987

- 1987
  - Jeanneke Pis statue is erected as counterpoint to Manneken Pis.
  - 9 May: The 32nd edition of the Eurovision Song Contest is held at Brussels Expo.
  - 16 May: Terres Neuves, the world's first climbing gym, opens.
- 1988
  - 28 July: Raoul Schouppe, a grocer and former warrant officer in the Belgian Air Force, is shot and killed by Abdelkader Belliraj.
  - 16 August: Marcel Bille is killed by Abdelkader Belliraj, allegedly for being a client of Moroccan male prostitutes.
  - 2 October: Metro line 2 begins service.
  - November: Kinepolis Brussels opens.

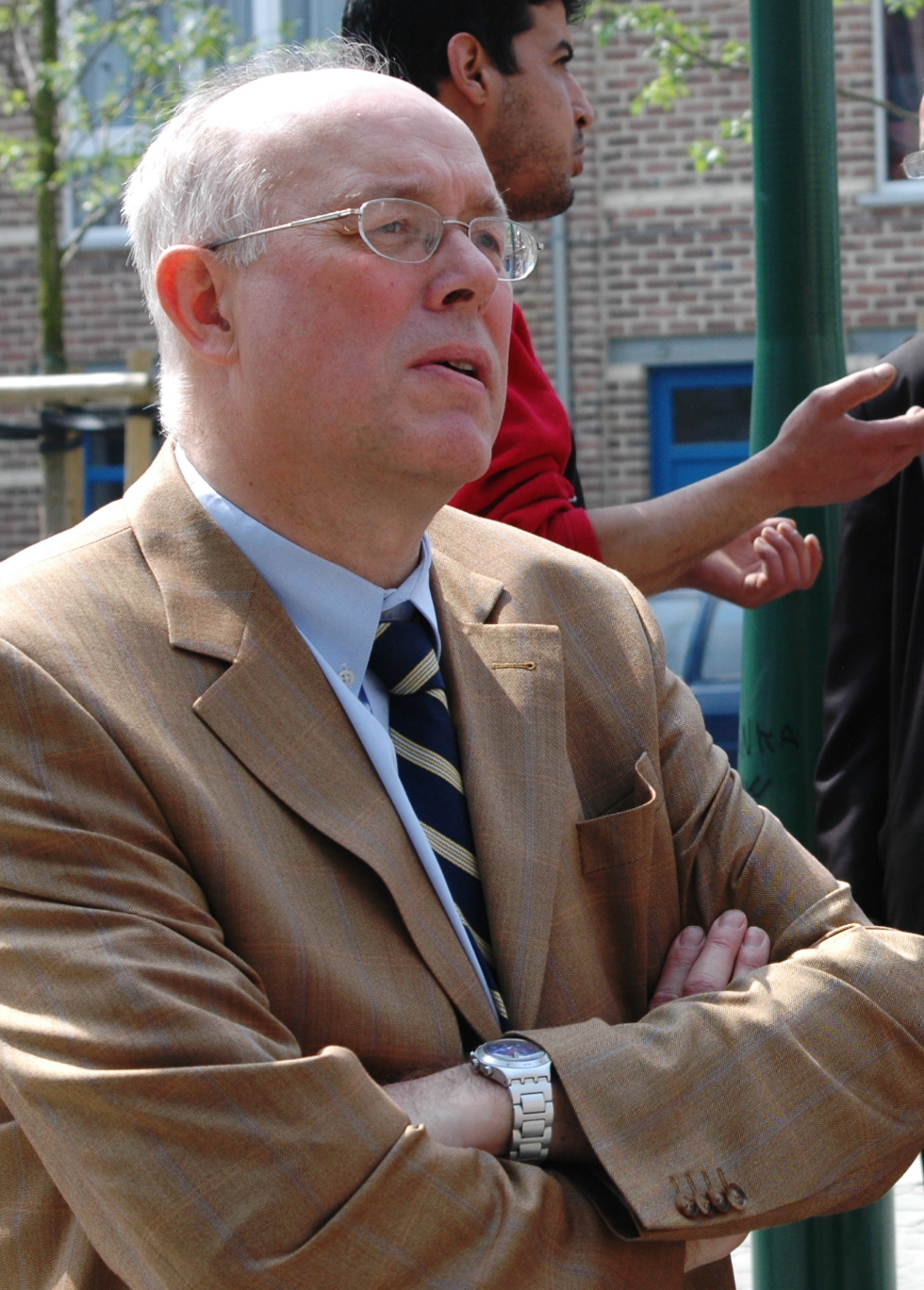
Charles Picqué, the first Minister-President of the Brussels Capital-Region, from 1989 to 1999

- 1989
  - 9 March: The Jewish Museum of Belgium opens.
  - 29 March: Saudi Arabian Imam Abdullah al-Ahdal and his assistant are fatally shot at the Great Mosque of Brussels by Abdelkader Belliraj.
  - 12 June: Mini-Europe opens.
  - 18 June: The Brussels-Capital Region is formed; the Parliament of the Brussels-Capital Region is established.
  - 20 June: Samir Gahez Rasoul, chauffeur to the Saudi ambassador, is killed by Abdelkader Belliraj, allegedly as collateral damage in a shot targeting a Saudi diplomat.
  - 12 July: Charles Picqué becomes the first Minister-President of the Brussels-Capital Region.
  - 14 July: The Flemish, French and Common Community Commissions are established.
  - 3 October: Joseph Wybran, an immunologist and Jewish community leader, is killed by Abdelkader Belliraj in the Erasmus Hospital car park.
  - 6 October: The Belgian Comic Strip Center opens.
- 1990
  - Population of the Brussels-Capital Region: 964,385.
  - The first Couleur Café is held.
  - 25 February: Kosovar human rights activist Enver Hadri is assassinated by three Yugoslavs working for the State Security Administration.
  - 22 March: Canadian engineer Gerald Bull is assassinated by Mossad outside his apartment in Uccle.
  - 6 May: The Armenian Apostolic St. Mary Magdalene's Church is consecrated.
  - 26 October: The first Le Pain Quotidien bakery is established on the Rue Antoine Dansaert/Antoine Dansaertstraat by Alain Coumont.
  - 23 December: The Brussels Intercommunal Transport Company is formed by the Government of the Brussels-Capital Region, replacing Transports Intercommunaux de Bruxelles.

First flag of the Brussels-Capital Region, used from 1991 to 2015

- 1991
  - The first comic strip murals is created on the Rue du Marché au Charbon/Kolenmarkt.
  - 5 March: The Brussels-Capital Region adopts its first flag.
  - 10–12 May: Riots erupt in Forest in response to police violence, leading to the arrest of 273 people.
  - 12 December: The Jeugdtheater Brussel is established after uncertainty regarding youth theatre within the Beursschouwburg.
- 1992
  - 27 March: Riots erupt in Cureghem/Kuregem.
  - 5 August: Loubna Benaïssa is killed on her way to the supermarket by Patrick Derochette.
- 1993
  - The Espace Léopold opens.
  - The first Brussels International Festival of Eroticism is held.
  - Tour & Taxis ceases operations as a distribution and customs center.
  - 20 January: The kidnapping of Ulrika Bidegård takes place.
  - 27 May: The Bruxella 1238 archaeological site is inaugurated.
  - 20 July: Michel Demaret is appointed mayor by the City Council.
  - 7 August: The funeral of King Baudouin takes place.
  - 9 August: King Albert II takes the constitutional oath at the Palace of the Nation.
  - 15 September: The Dutch-language television station TV Brussel is launched from the Royal Flemish Theatre.; Beliris is established.
  - 7 October: An ordinance is adopted to establish a framework for enhancing vulnerable neighbourhoods, later referred to as "neighbourhood contracts".
  - 4 December: Tram line 82 begins service.
- 1994
  - The City of Brussels is designated capital of Belgium and seat of the Federal Government.
  - 1 March: An explosion in a Hunderenveld apartment building in Berchem-Sainte-Agathe causes a partial collapse of three floors, killing six tenants.
  - 1 April: The first Kunstenfestivaldesarts (KFDA) is held.
  - 28 April: Freddy Thielemans is elected mayor for the first time.
  - 16 April: The Fuse nightclub opens.
  - 30 June: The Performing Arts Research and Training Studios (P.A.R.T.S.) contemporary dance school is established as the successor of Mudra.
  - 14 November: The international terminal of Brussels-South railway station opens.
- 1995
  - The Erasmus Brussels University of Applied Sciences and Arts (EhB) is established.
  - 1 January: The Province of Brabant is split into Flemish Brabant and Walloon Brabant; The Governor of the Administrative Arrondissement Brussels-Capital is established.
  - 5 April: Riots erupt in Molenbeek; several gendarmes and a TV Brussel cameraman are injured.
  - 21 May: François-Xavier de Donnea is appointed mayor by the City Council.
  - 4 June: Father Damien is beatified by Pope John Paul II at the Basilica of the Sacred Heart.
- 1996
  - The South Tower is renovated.
  - 16 March: The Flemish Council relocates to the Hôtel des Postes et de la Marine.
  - 18 May: The Belgian Lesbian and Gay Pride, Roze Zaterdag, Samedi Rose pride parade is first held.
  - 14 October: The spaghetti ruling occurs, the Court of Cassation removes the investigating judge Jean-Marc Connerotte from the Dutroux affair after he attends a dinner with the victims.
  - 20 October: The White March occurs, with about 275,000 participants, as a protest against the mishandling of the Dutroux affair.
- 1997
  - 16 October: András Pándy is arrested for the murders of his wife, ex-wife, two biological children, and two step-children, all of whom mysteriously disappeared.
  - 7 November: Riots erupt in Cureghem after the Gendarmerie fatally shoot Saïd Charki, an alleged drug dealer, in his car.
- 1998
  - The Musical Instruments Museum (MIM) relocates to the Hôtel de Spangen and the former Old England department store.
  - The first Brussels Short Film Festival is held.
  - 5 March: The Cercle de Lorraine business club is founded at the Château Fond'Roy.
  - 22 September: Nigerian asylum seeker Sémira Adamu is suffocated to death by two police officers.
  - 26 December: A fire breaks out in the Royal Park Theatre.
  - 17 November: Anti-Kurdish violence erupt, as around 300 Turkish youths target the Kurdish community of Saint-Josse-ten-Noode.
  - 2 December The Grand-Place is listed as a UNESCO World Heritage Site.
- 1999
  - Het Zinneke statue is erected by analogy with Manneken and Jeanneke Pis.
  - 5 June: The René Magritte Museum opens.
  - 15 July: Jacques Simonet becomes Minister-President of the Brussels-Capital Region.
  - 8 September: The Clockarium is established.
  - 4 December: The wedding of Prince Philippe and Mathilde d'Udekem d'Acoz takes place.
- 2000
  - The city is named European Capital of Culture alongside eight other European cities.
  - The Hôtel Tassel, Hôtel Solvay, Hôtel van Eetvelde and Maison & Atelier Horta are listed as 'Major Town Houses of the Architect Victor Horta' UNESCO World Heritage Sites.
  - 27 May: The first Zinneke Parade is held.
  - 10 June–2 July: The city co-hosts the UEFA Euro 2000.
  - 28 July: The city is divided into five police zones.
  - 22 September: The Brussels Stock Exchange merges with Paris Bourse and the Amsterdam Stock Exchange to form Euronext, and is renamed Euronext Brussels.
  - 28 September: The Brussels Volkstejoêter, a troupe performing in the Brussels dialect, is established.
  - 18 October: François-Xavier de Donnea becomes Minister-President.

== See also ==
- Timeline of Brussels
- History of Brussels
