= Brussels Pride =

Annual pride festival in Brussels, Belgium

Coordinates: 50°50′39.512″N 4°21′21.528″E

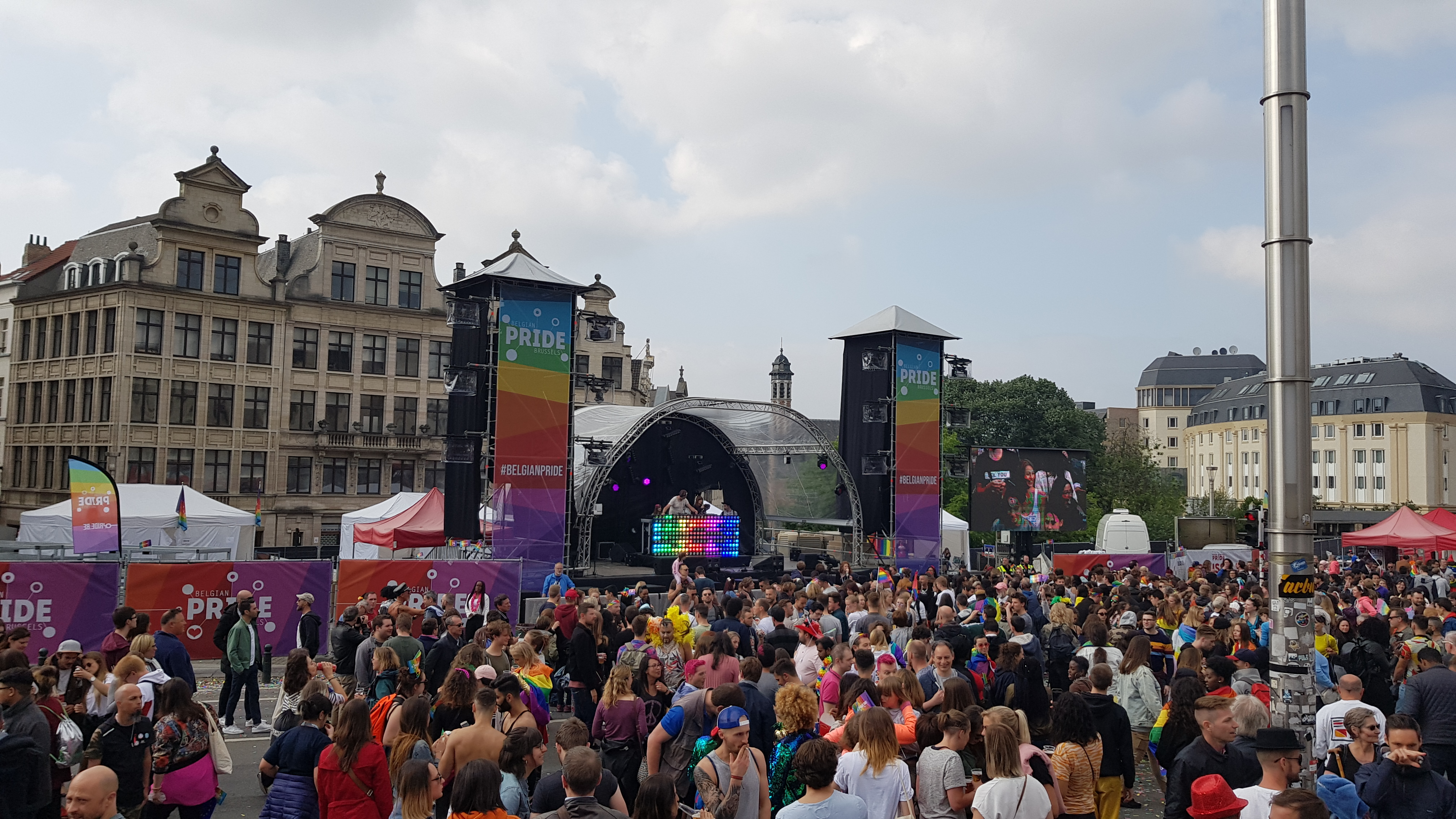
- The Belgian Pride in 2018
- Genre: Pride festival
- Frequency: Annually, around 17 May
- Location: Brussels
- Country: Belgium
- Inaugurated: 18 March 1978; 48 years ago
- Previous event: 16 May 2026
- Next event: May 2027
- Organiser: RainbowHouse Brussels
- Website: Official website

Brussels Pride is an annual event celebrating the LGBTQIA+ community in Brussels. It takes place each year around 17 May, coinciding with the International Day Against Homophobia, Biphobia and Transphobia (IDAHOBIT). The event brings together associations, institutions, and thousands of participants to promote the values of openness, diversity, and inclusion.

The celebration consists of several main components. The Pride March is a festive parade through the streets of Brussels featuring floats, music, and participants dressed in colourful costumes and accessories. The Pride Village gathers public and private organisations that provide information and raise awareness about LGBTQIA+ rights and issues, while the Pride Stage, located on the Mont des Arts, hosts performances by Belgian and Brussels-based artists, many from the LGBTQIA+ community. The Rainbow Village, situated in the historic St James Quarter, unites local associations and LGBTQIA+ venues that organise numerous events in the days leading up to and during the Pride.

In addition to the main parade, Pride Week offers ten days of activities across Brussels, including workshops, debates, concerts, performances, and community gatherings. These are organised by artists, activists, and collectives, with projects selected by a cultural council. Over the years, Brussels Pride has become a major cultural and activist event in Belgium, open to both members of the LGBTQIA+ community and allies celebrating equality and diversity.

== History ==
The origins of Brussels Pride are closely linked to the international LGBTQIA+ rights movement that began with the Stonewall riots in New York City on the night of 27–28 June 1969. When police raided the Stonewall Inn, a gay bar in Greenwich Village, the ensuing resistance from lesbian, gay, bisexual, and transgender patrons marked a turning point in the global struggle for equal rights. The riots inspired LGBTQIA+ activism worldwide, including in Belgium, though the original news of Stonewall barely reached the country at the time.

Belgium's first Gay Day took place on 18 March 1978 at the Floraliënpaleis in Ghent, organised by De Rooie Vlinder, a left-wing feminist collective with a more activist approach than the moderate Federatie Werkgroepen Homofilie (FWH). A second Gay Day followed in Antwerp on 5 May 1979, featuring the evening event Janettennacht (lit. 'Sissies Night'), meant to celebrate gay pride and including the country's first-ever march through city streets. The third edition was held on 28 June 1980 in Brussels, co-organised by the FWH and the Brussels CCL,. It was the first to make an explicit connection to the Stonewall riots and also aimed to include women as part of a “Day for Gays and Lesbians.” However, it only drew around 1,000 participants, the majority of whom were Flemish.

In 1981, the demonstration returned to Antwerp, but after De Rooie Vlinder disbanded and divisions arose within the FWH, regular Pink Saturdays ceased during the 1980s. Lesbian groups, feeling underrepresented, began organising their own Lesbian Day events in 1983, later renamed L-day and held annually in Ghent from 1986 onwards.

Inspired by the Dutch Roze Zaterdag, the FWH and Roze Aktiefront (RAF) joined forces to form a new committee, leading to a revived Pink Saturday in Antwerp on 5 May 1990. Biennial editions followed in Ghent (1992), Antwerp (1994), and finally Brussels in 1996. Around 4,500 participants attended the 1996 event, which was officially named the Belgian Lesbian and Gay Pride (BLGP), a title chosen to unite Belgium's three linguistic communities under a single English name. Despite this, the term Roze Zaterdag remained in common use.

In 1996, the non-profit organisation Belgian Lesbian and Gay Pride, Roze Zaterdag, Samedi Rose was founded to coordinate the Pride events in Brussels. That year's edition brought together participants from Brussels, Wallonia, and abroad, and its success led to the decision to host the Pride annually in the capital from then on. The early marches were highly activist, with ten major demands displayed in 1997, including anti-discrimination laws and legal recognition for same-sex couples. Legislative progress soon followed: Belgium adopted legal cohabitation (1998), an anti-discrimination law (2002), same-sex marriage (2003), and adoption rights for all couples (2006).

In 2009, the slogan “Pride for Everyone” reflected the growing inclusivity of the event. It was renamed The Belgian Pride, and in 2012 it became a formal collaboration with visit.brussels, the city's tourism office. Attendance tripled within five years, reaching 100,000 participants in 2015, a year focused on transgender rights. Despite the terrorist attacks in March 2016, the Pride went ahead with a modified route, the main stage was moved from the Bourse to Mont des Arts, which became the event's permanent home as the Bourse had turned into a memorial site.

For the 2017 Pride, several rainbow initiatives were launched in Brussels, including rainbow crosswalks, LGBTQ-themed traffic lights, a rainbow-coloured bus, and buildings illuminated in rainbow hues. Attendance ranged from 55,000 to 90,000 according to police and organisers. The 2018 edition reached a historic peak, featuring over 70 events between 4 and 20 May, attracting more than 140,000 visitors for Pride Week and around 100,000 spectators for the parade. The theme #YourLocalPower encouraged local engagement for LGBTQIA+ inclusion and wellbeing.

In March 2020, organisers announced that companies and political parties wishing to participate would be screened on their gender inclusion policies and adherence to the Pride's five key principles. However, due to the COVID-19 pandemic, the 2020 parade was postponed and later cancelled entirely. The 2021 edition also could not take place in its traditional form; instead, online events were held alongside Q.Artz, a new multidisciplinary arts festival in Brussels celebrating LGBTQIA+ artists and cultural initiatives.

When the event finally returned in 2022, it drew around 120,000 participants. That same year, following internal disputes and the impact of the COVID-19 pandemic, the organisation of the Pride festivities shifted from the non-profit The Belgian Pride to RainbowHouse Brussels. The event was relaunched under the name Rainbow Festival, while visit.brussels continued to handle the logistical aspects.

In 2023, the event officially adopted its current name, Brussels Pride, highlighting its international visibility and strong connection to the city. On 13 September 2024, the Brussels-Capital Region added Brussels Pride to its Inventory of Intangible Cultural Heritage. This recognition made Brussels Pride only the second Pride in the world to benefit from such institutional acknowledgment. Looking ahead, a transnational application led by Amsterdam is planned to be submitted to UNESCO in the coming years, aiming for official recognition of Pride worldwide and reinforcing the protection of LGBTQIA+ rights globally at a time of renewed challenges.

A few weeks later, on 8 October 2024, the Brussels commercial court declared the non-profit The Belgian Pride bankrupt, citing outstanding debts. Internal conflicts, the loss of subsidies, and the transfer of activities to RainbowHouse Brussels had left the organisation without resources.

During the 2026 edition, LGBTQ+ performers and drag queens Diva Beiroet, Sherine Falasteen and Anira Orlando, were assaulted in a homophobic attack by a group of around twenty teenagers. The Brussels Pride organisation reacted by stating "This is why Pride is still necessary."

== Editions ==
Date	Theme	Location	Note
18 March 1978		Ghent	
5 May 1979		Antwerp	
28 June 1980		Brussels	
9 May 1981		Antwerp	
5 May 1990		Antwerp	
5 May 1992		Ghent	
7 May 1994		Antwerp	
18 May 1996		Brussels	
1997		Brussels	
2 May 1998	En avant marche	Brussels	
1999	Equal rights now	Brussels	
2000	Equal rights now	Brussels	
2001	LGBT rights are human rights	Brussels	
4 May 2002	A law against discrimination and for the opening up of marriage	Brussels	
2003	We want more	Brussels	
22 May 2004	Freedom, Equality, Diversity	Brussels	
7 May 2005	It's a Family Affair	Brussels	
27 May 2006	Diver City	Brussels	
