= Oath of the Kings of the Belgians =

Swearing-in oath

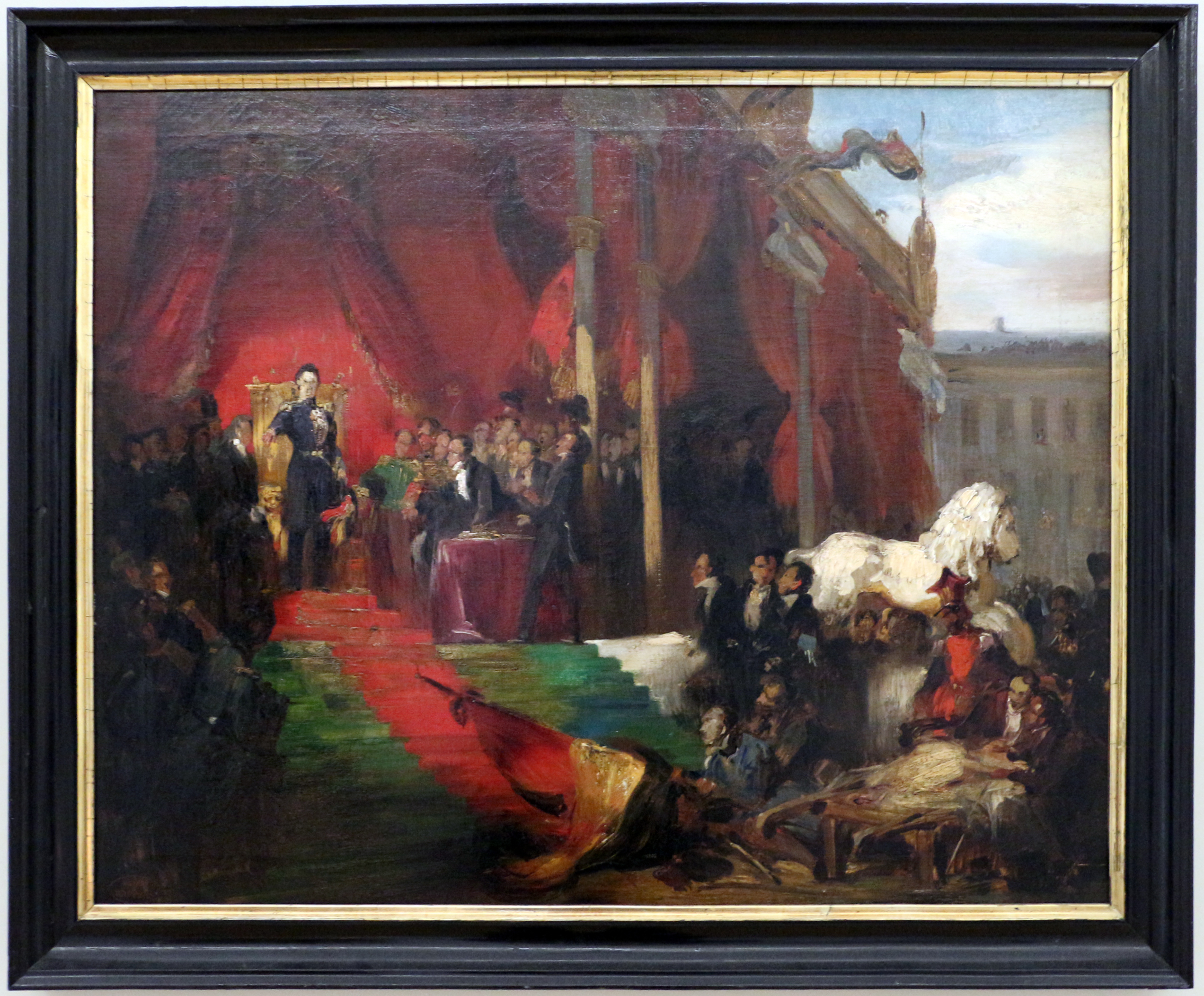
Study for "La prestation de serment du roi Léopold Ier", by Gustave Wappers (1831)

The swearing-in ceremony (Dutch: eedaflegging; French: prestation de serment) occurs when the Belgian heir-apparent or heir-presumptive takes the oath that allows him or her to become King or Queen regnant of the Belgians. Article 91 of the Belgian Constitution outlines this ceremony, which transpires no later then ten days after the death or abdication of the previous monarch, at the Palace of the Nation in Brussels, the seat of the Belgian Parliament. Should the monarch be unable to govern for more than ten days, the same oath is taken by the regent appointed by the Chambers.

A significant and symbolic act in the Belgian constitutional monarchy system, the swearing-in of the oath distinguishes itself from the automatic successions of Ancien Régime monarchies. It conditions the accession of the sovereign to the throne. By accepting their constitutional mandate, the monarch becomes the Nation's delegate and can exercise the prerogatives devolved to them by the Constitution.

The date of Leopold I's swearing-in (21 July 1831) is marked annually by Belgian National Day, a public holiday, established by law on 27 May 1890.

== History ==
=== Surlet de Chokier (regent) ===
Although not a royal oath, it is noteworthy to mention the inauguration of regent Érasme-Louis Surlet de Chokier on 25 February 1831, which took place at the Palace of the Nation in Brussels. The ceremony occurred in a grandiose setting with a sizable audience in attendance. The regent, garbed in a modest black habit, was welcomed by a row of civic guards who bestowed him with his coat of arms. Standing on a platform, he took the constitutional oath and delivered a brief speech to a standing ovation.

"Your choice, gentlemen, to fulfill these eminent functions has been fixed on my person; at the same time as it is the most flattering, the most honorable testimony that a citizen can ever receive from the confidence and benevolence of the Nation's representatives, it imposes duties and obligations on me which it would be impossible for me to fulfill with honor, if I am not supported by the continuation of these same sentiments."

— Speech by Regent Surlet de Chokier

=== Leopold I ===
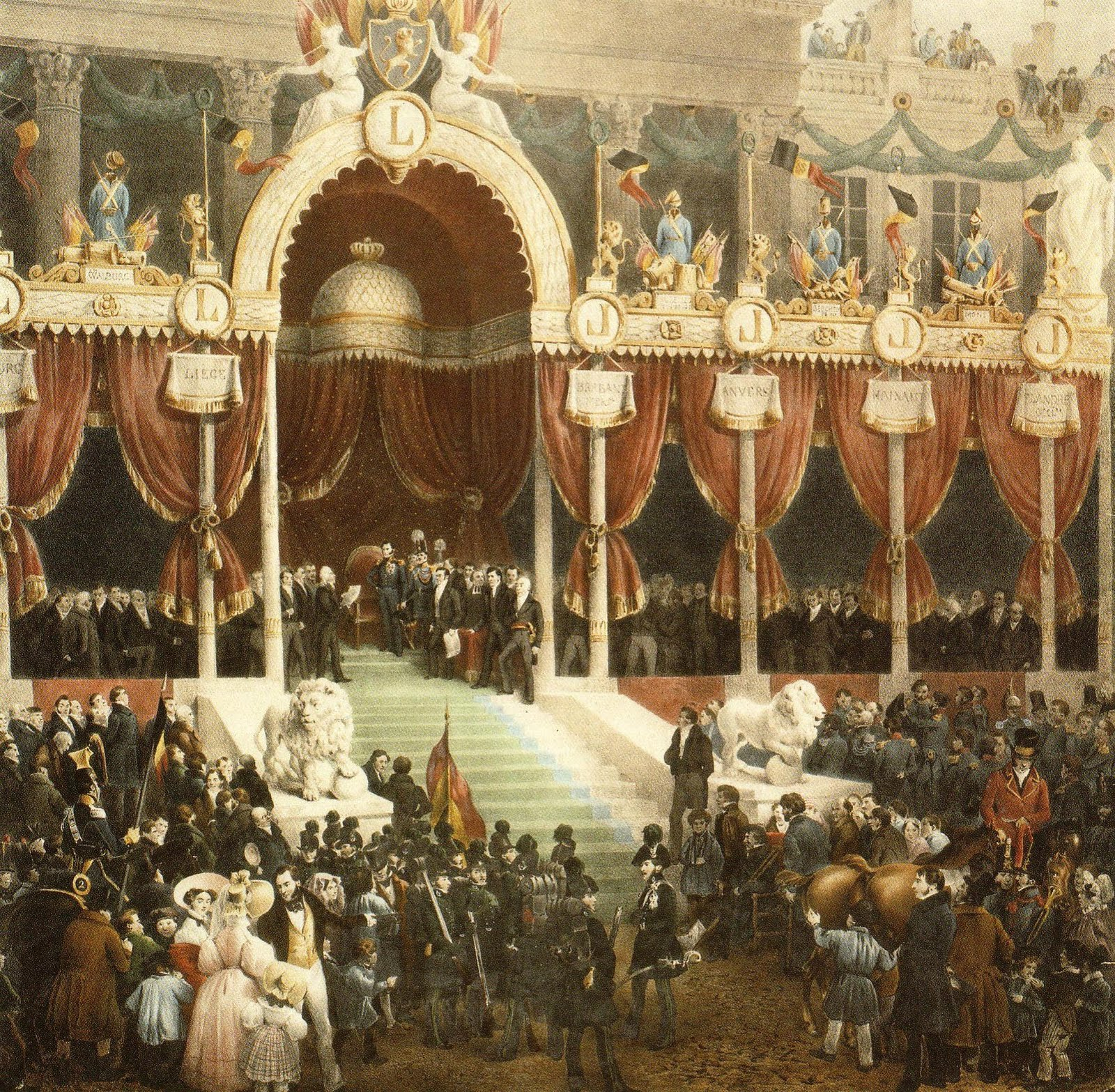
"La prestation de serment de Léopold Ier", by Gustave Wappers (1831)

Following this precedent, the first-ever royal oath-taking ceremony occurred in Belgian history on 21 July 1831, using a unique ceremonial that was not repeated for future investitures. Leopold of Saxe-Coburg and Gotha was elected as King of the Belgians under the name Leopold I, arriving in an unfamiliar country where the kingdom's regent and other members of the National Congress had already made preparations. For this significant occasion for the fledgling kingdom, the political authorities looked to the Joyous Entry of the former Dukes of Brabant and the investitures of the Netherlands (including that of the former King William I in Brussels) as well as the former Principality of Liège for inspiration. Consequently, unlike subsequent investitures, this ceremony was conducted in public.

Upon arriving in Brussels at daybreak through the Porte Guillaume, Nicolas Rouppe, the Burgomaster of Brussels, presented Leopold with the keys to the city; however, the king declined, saying "they couldn't be in better hands." Leopold then proceeded to the Place Royale/Koningsplein in front of the Church of St. James on Coudenberg, where the remainder of the ceremony took place. A raised platform and a canopy, displaying the names of the Revolution's victories, had been set up. The ceremony took place in a crimson draped gallery where a large crowd of Congress members cheered enthusiastically. The event began at 1:15pm with the transfer of the regent's powers to Étienne de Gerlache, the president of the House of Representatives. Viscount Charles Vilain XIIII read 139 articles of the Constitution followed by the king taking the oath and giving a brief French speech. Étienne de Gerlache then proclaimed "Sire, montez au trône" signaling the king's ascent to the throne.

"Belgian by your adoption, I will also make it a law to always be so by my politics [...]. Gentlemen, I only accepted the crown you offered me in order to fulfill a task as noble as it is useful, that of being called upon to consolidate the institutions of a generous People and to maintain its independence. My heart knows no other ambition than to see you happy".

— Speech by King Leopold I on 21 July 1831.

=== Leopold II ===
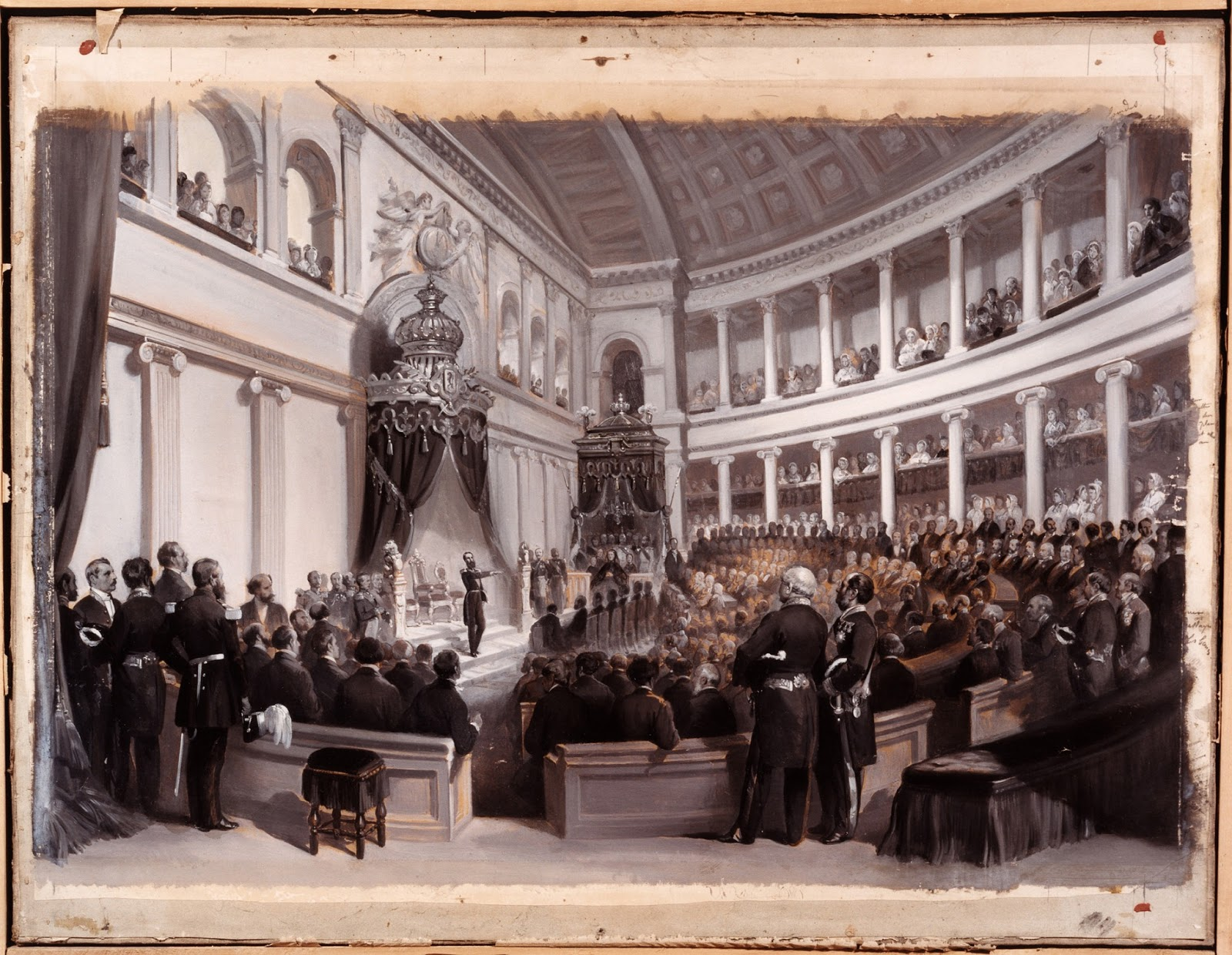
"Prestation de serment de Léopold II", gouache on albumen photograph by Louis-Joseph Ghémar (1865)

Seven days following Leopold I's death, his oldest son Prince Leopold was sworn in as Leopold II on 17 December 1865. He arrived on horseback at the Palace of the Nation with his brother Philippe and received enthusiastic public praise. He then walked into an unadorned hemicycle. In accordance with the monarch's request, a ceremonial throne featuring armrests decorated with lions and a red velvet backrest inscribed with the national motto was positioned beneath a regal dais. Present in the audience were not only the parliamentary body, but also cabinet members, judges, high-ranking civil servants, the bishopric, and the diplomatic corps. Despite its ornamental nature, the throne held no practical significance. The royal family, attired in mourning, sat in a separate gallery accompanied by a large number of aristocrats as per the sovereign's request. Upon delivering his speech and taking the oath, the king and his son, the Duke of Brabant, emerged onto the balcony of the Royal Palace to observe a military parade on the Place des Palais/Paleizenplein. The ceremony was conducted amidst a joyful atmosphere of "indescribable enthusiasm."

"Belgium has seen things accomplished which, in a country the size of ours, have rarely been achieved by a single generation. But the edifice whose foundations the Congress has laid can and will rise again."

— Speech by King Leopold II on 17 December 1865.

=== Albert I ===
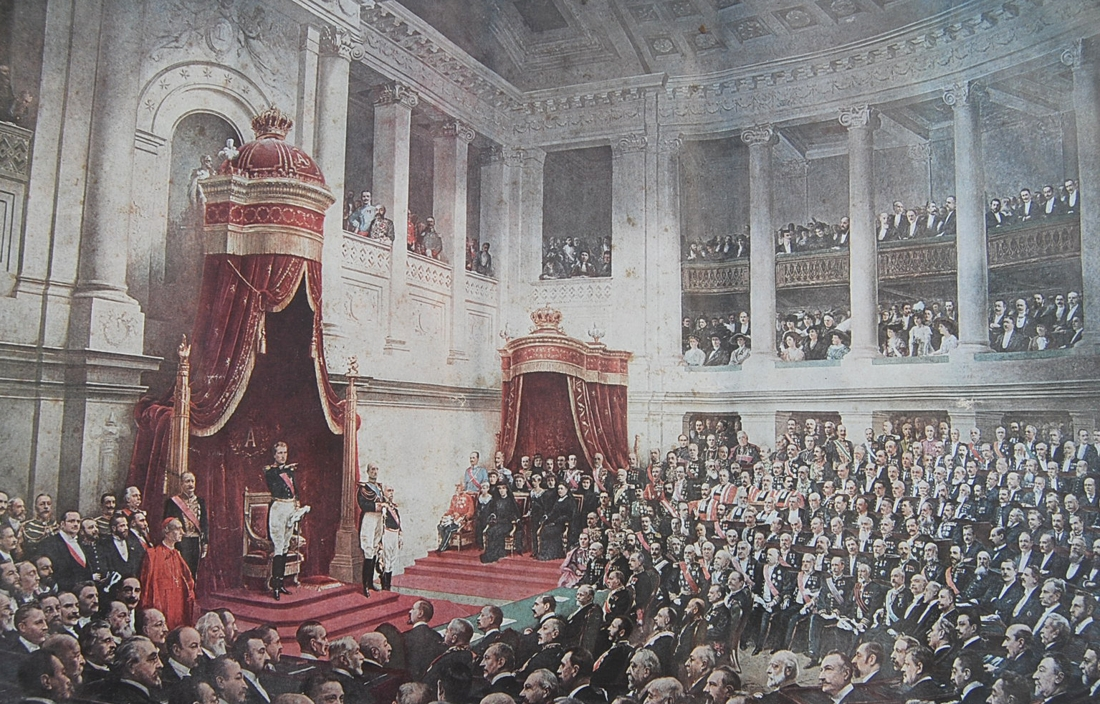
"Prestation de serment du roi Albert Ier", by Jules Cran (1909)

On 23 December 1909, just six days following the death of Leopold II, his nephew, Prince Albert, rode to the Palace of the Nation. In the same scene where his uncle had sworn in, he joined the royal family, who were already seated under their canopy. The monarch, for the first time, gave his oath in Dutch to emphasize the bilingual nature of the kingdom secured by the Equality Act of 1898 (Loi du 18 avril 1898 relative à l'emploi de la langue flamande dans les publications officielles). After receiving a standing ovation from parliamentarians, Workers' Party representatives attempted to interrupt the ceremony with shouts of "Long live universal suffrage!" (Vive le suffrage universel!). However, the assembly quickly drowned out the disruptive voices with cheers of "Long live the king!" (Vive le roi!). During his self-written speech, the new king expressed a desire to improve colonial policy by implementing a program worthy of the Congo. The next day, the royal couple attended a Te Deum ceremony at the Church of St. Michael and St. Gudula (now Brussels' cathedral).

"I have a clear vision of my task. The duty of Princes is dictated to their conscience by the soul of the people; for, if the Throne has its prerogatives, it has above all its responsibilities."

— Speech by King Albert I on 23 December 1909.

=== Leopold III ===
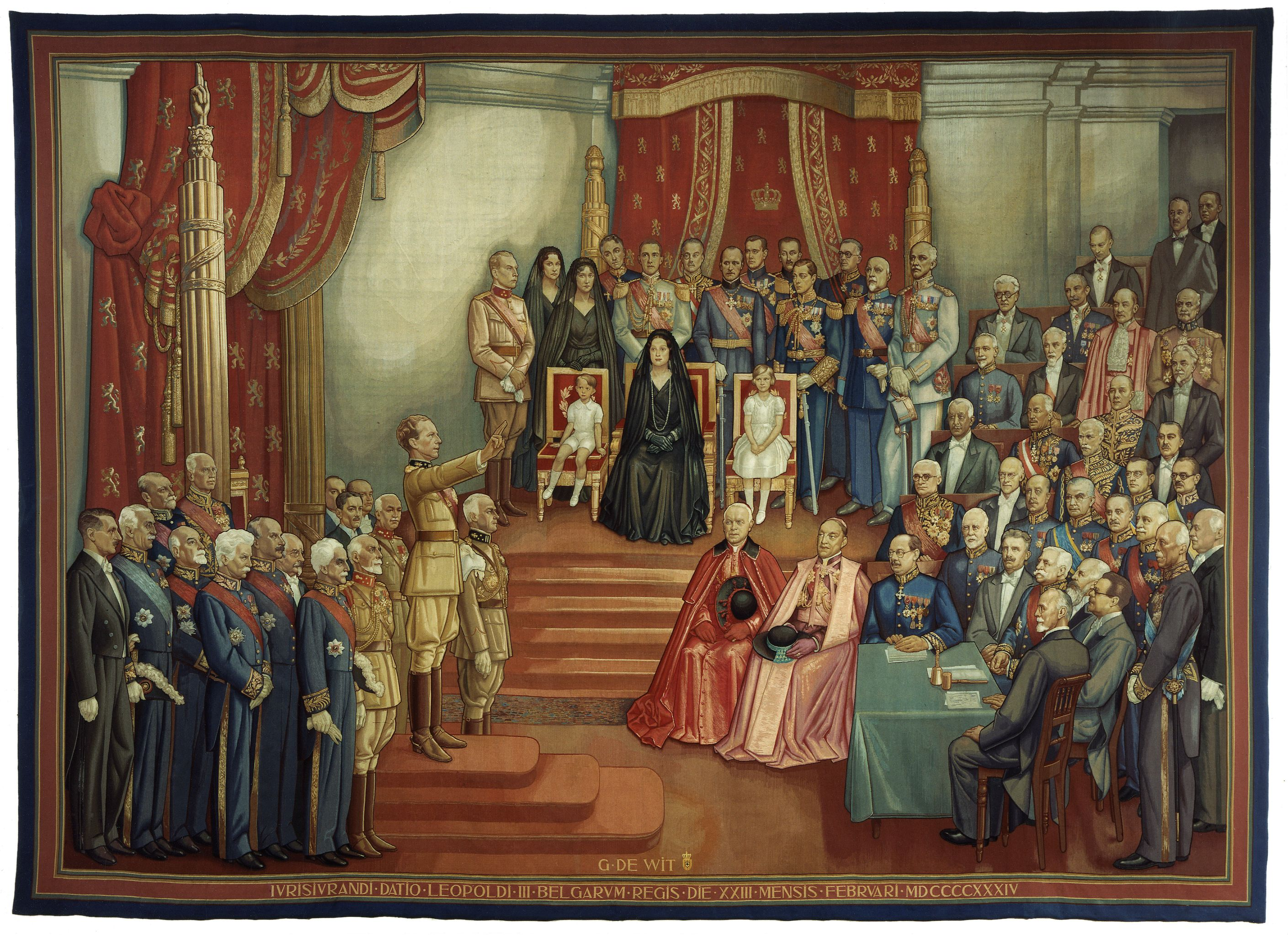
Depiction of Leopold III taking the constitutional oath in February 1934

Prince Leopold took his oath of office on 23 February 1934, six days following Albert I's fatal mountaineering accident. He rode on horseback alongside his brother Charles and was greeted by a cheering crowd as he made his way from the Palace of Laeken to the Palace of the Nation. Despite the sadness of his bereavement, he pronounced his oath without hesitation. Upon ascension to the throne, Leopold III paid his respects to the Unknown Soldier at the Congress Column:

"I know the difficult duties that this oath imposes on me, and to fulfill them without fail I can do no better than to draw inspiration from the example of three great predecessors [...]. The Belgian dynasty is at the service of the Nation. I am determined never to forget that...".

— Speech by King Leopold III on 23 February 1934.

=== Charles (regent) ===
In 1944, following the Liberation, King Leopold III was imprisoned by the Third Reich, hence unable to rule. Although the constitutional regulations allowed for the establishment of a regency beyond a ten-day interregnum, some republican parties endeavored to create a republic. Ultimately, after two rounds of voting, the king's younger brother, the Count of Flanders, was selected as the regent. On 21 September 1944, the ceremony took place in a straightforward environment adorned with the flags representing the Allied nations. The individual in question swiftly pledged to "sauver le brol," as he voiced it. Notably, this oath marked the first instance of taking a pledge while refraining from raising an outstretched arm – a gesture that bore a resemblance to the Roman salute implemented during Fascist rituals.

=== Baudouin ===
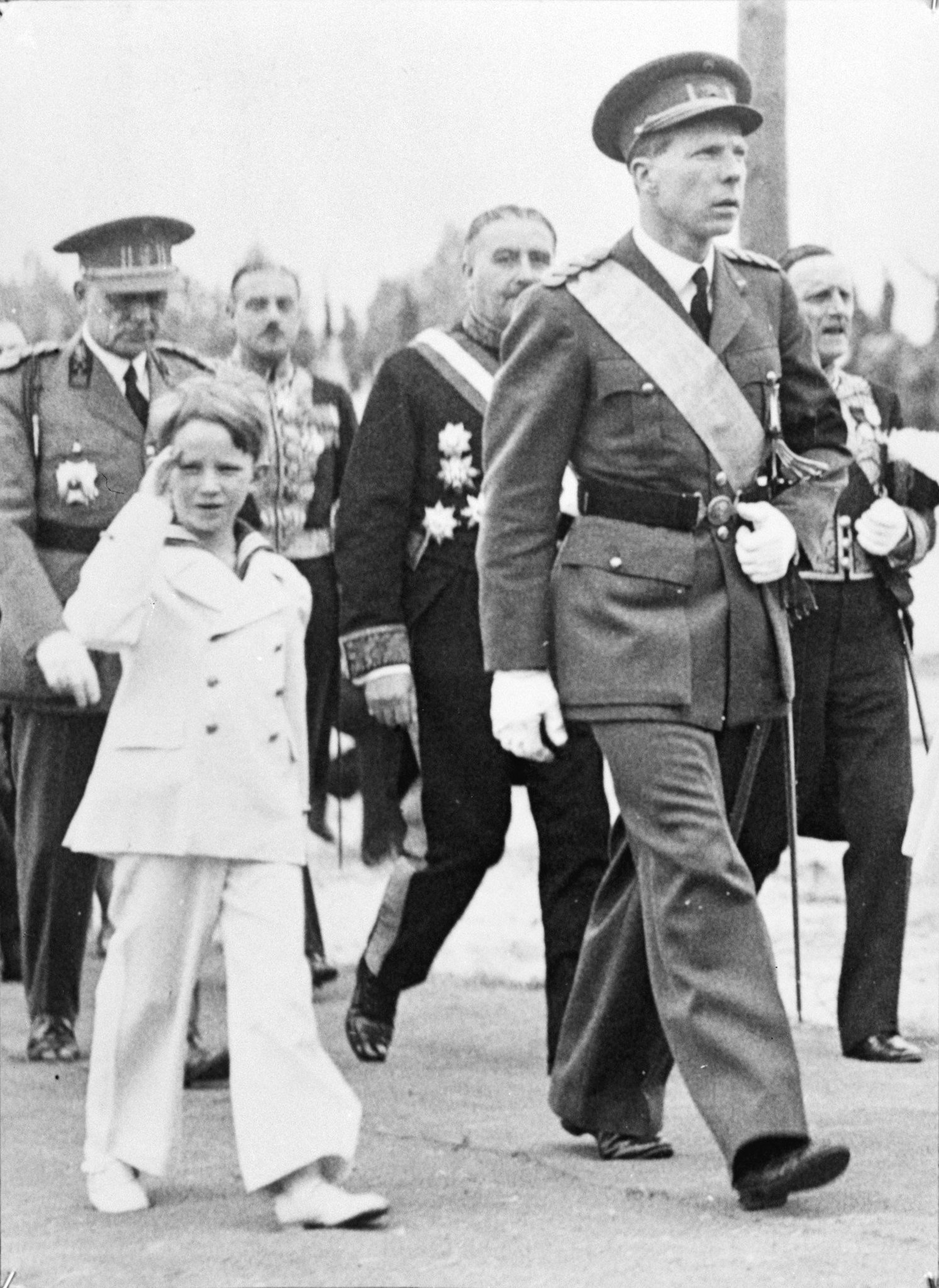
Regent Charles accompanied by young Prince Baudouin

King Baudouin was sworn in twice. The first instance occurred on 11 August 1950, when Leopold III delegated his powers to his son to address the Royal Question. As a result, the son became the "Prince Royal," a special title equivalent to a de facto regency, as Leopold III aimed to prolong his abdication. During the ceremony, Communist parliamentarians led by Julien Lahaut launched the thunderous chant of "Vive la République!" in front of a visibly uncomfortable prince. However, the cheers for the prince quickly drowned out the chant. Baudouin took his oath while disregarding the Republican outbursts. The second oath occurred on 17 July 1951, the day following King Leopold's abdication. The ceremonies were less extravagant than those of preceding monarchs, and foreign ambassadors and the royal family were absent as the events were not conducive to great family joy. Upon becoming king, Baudouin paid homage to the Unknown Soldier before appearing, solemn and alone, on the balcony of the royal palace:

"The union of all the country's forces and the mutual understanding of our two national cultures will make possible the constant development of Belgium's material and moral heritage [...]. I hope that, with my government, I will succeed in making concord reign among the Belgians."

— Speech by King Baudouin.

=== Albert II ===
On 9 August 1993, Albert, Prince of Liège, arrived at the Palace of the Nation at 3 p.m., two days after the funeral of King Baudouin. With no canopy, but with the royal chair present (which incidentally was too big for him), he took his oath in all three official languages of Belgium: Dutch, French, and German. The setting was intentionally simple. This marked the first time a king of a federal Belgium had taken a royal oath. The Prince appeared emotionally affected, with his head and hands shaking. Jean-Pierre Van Rossem exclaimed "Vive la République d'Europe!" before the audience echoed "Vive le roi!". Following the speech, which was widely deemed successful in the political world, the royal couple traveled back to the palace by car to make their customary appearance on the balcony.

"At a time when collective egoism is taking worrying forms all over the world, let's show that it is possible for men and women from different cultures to live harmoniously in the same country... To face the threat of collective egoism, there is only one solution: solidarity."

— Speech by King Albert II on 9 August 1993.

=== Philippe ===
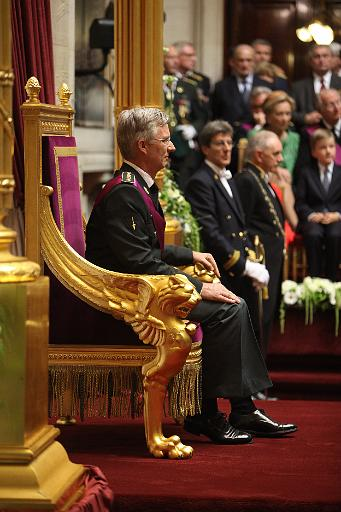
King Philippe seated on the throne as he takes the oath

On 21 July 2013, King Albert II abdicated during a national holiday. Following his father's abdication ceremony at the Royal Palace, Prince Philippe proceeded to the Palace of the Nation. At approximately noon, he took the oath of office and became the seventh King of the Belgians. The parliamentarians and royal family extended long applause, before he delivered a confident speech. Interestingly, no one interrupted the ceremony with a proclamation.

"We are facing a crisis that is hitting many of our fellow citizens hard. Today, I want to encourage every man and woman to face up to it. There is unsuspected potential in all of us, just waiting to be revealed. I am deeply convinced of this."

— Speech by King Philippe on 21 July 2013.

=== Legal analysis ===
While most European monarchs take the oath during investiture, the Belgian monarchy stands out because the oath serves as a condition for accessing the throne, resulting in an interregnum. Thus, the prince or princess only becomes king or queen-regnant when he or she takes the oath as prescribed by Article 91 of the Belgian Constitution. Some constitutional scholars argue that the oath solely authorizes the use of powers granted by the Constitution, with the royal title passing directly upon the predecessor's death. Nevertheless, their viewpoint lacks consensus. Unlike the monarchies of the Ancien Régime, succession is not automatic.

The oath of office is the foundation of the Belgian constitutional monarchy, which is akin to a quasi-republican system with hereditary traits. The sovereignty of the monarch is based on the acceptance of his mandate as a delegate of the Nation. As such, the monarch is a "simple" magistrate in the constitutional order. Symbolically, it is the monarch's duty to take the oath before the Belgian Parliament.

According to Walter Ganshof van der Meersch, the monarch must renew by oath the pact that unites the nation to a dynasty that reigns solely by will of the constituent, rather than pre-existing rights, to accede to the throne. Meanwhile, Henri Pirenne states that the monarch must go before the Chambers, which hold the power of the National Congress, to "take the crown and, so to speak, conclude the mystical marriage which [must] unite him to the Nation".

== Process ==
=== Accession to the throne ===
As per Article 85 of the Belgian Constitution, Belgium is a hereditary monarchy descended from S.M. Leopold, Georges, Chrétien, Frédéric de Saxe-Cobourg, in direct, natural and legitimate succession by order of primogeniture. Consequently, any children adopted or born out of wedlock by the king are excluded by these guidelines. The rules of succession have been amended twice since 1831. The first amendment was made on 7 September 1893, by King Leopold II, who stripped any heir who married without royal consent of their rights to the crown. The second amendment occurred on 21 June 1991, when the Salic Law was overturned, allowing women to ascend the throne, but only from Albert II's descendants. This is the reason why Joséphine-Charlotte of Belgium did not become the queen when Baudouin died.

In the event of a monarch's death or abdication, the Council of Ministers assumes the constitutional powers of the sovereign. This interregnum must not exceed ten days and continues until the heir-apparent or heir-presumptive is inaugurated, or in the event of their absence (such as if they are too young), until a regent is appointed and inaugurated in the same manner as that of a monarch.

=== Ceremony at the Palace of the Nation ===
The events described here relates to the swearing-in ceremony of King Philippe on 21 July 2013, which was altered due to the abdication and tributes of King Albert II, and the national holiday ceremonies. Therefore, there were differences from previous ceremonies.

Upon arrival at the peristyle of the Palace of the Nation, the Duke of Brabant, dressed in military attire, proceeded into the building. At the same time, the hemicycle hall was filled with several hundred attendees, including parliament members, ministers, deputies, high court members, ambassadors, clergymen, and representatives from the European Union and NATO, who occupied their seats or stood in the aisles. Additional seats for the royal family were positioned to the left of the throne. The members of the royal family took their seats in a specific order as the audience applauded. The order of entry for the last oath was as follows: the royal children, Queen Fabiola, Princess Mathilde, King Albert II and Queen Paola, and finally the rest of the royal family. The usher then announced the arrival of the soon-to-be king in the three national languages, stating "The King!" ("De Koning!", "Le Roi!", "Der König!"). It is noteworthy that the constitutional regulation mandated that he could not be considered king until the oath had been administered. The Senate and House of Representatives presidents welcomed the Duke of Brabant, urging him to take the oath. The Duke of Brabant subsequently reads the constitutional formula in the three official languages while lifting his arm with his index and middle fingers joined and raised.

Oath in Dutch	Oath in French	Oath in German	Translation
Ik zweer dat ik de Grondwet en de wetten van het Belgische volk zal naleven, 's Lands onafhankelijkheid handhaven en het grondgebied ongeschonden bewaren.	Je jure d'observer la Constitution et les lois du peuple belge, de maintenir l'indépendance nationale et l'intégrité du territoire.	Ich schwöre, die Verfassung und die Gesetze des belgischen Volkes zu beachten, die Unabhängigkeit des Landes zu erhalten und die Unversehrtheit des Staatsgebietes zu wahren.	I swear to observe the Constitution and the laws of the Belgian people, maintain the independence of the country, and maintain the integrity of its territory.

After ascending to the throne, the new King of the Belgians was greeted by a standing ovation from the audience. He then proceeded to deliver his personal speech, accompanied by performances of the Brabançonne and the European Anthem. Following this, the new monarch signed the Golden Book and exited the premises. To commemorate the occasion, 101 cannon shots were fired every 30 seconds from the Parc du Cinquantenaire/Jubelpark.

=== Joyous Entry ===
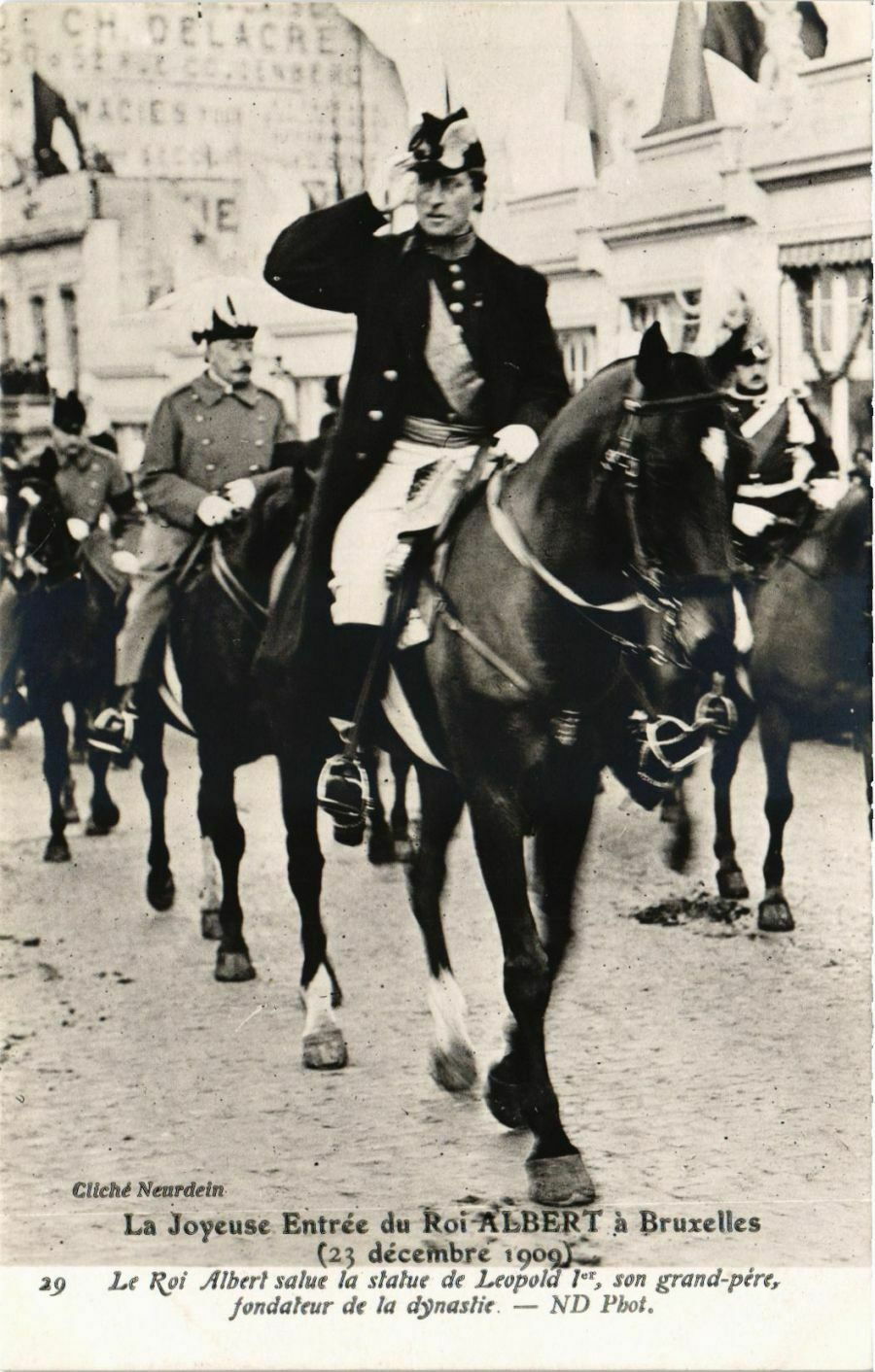
Albert I's Joyous Entry into Brussels on 23 December 1909

After the ceremony, the royal couple enters Brussels with their Joyous Entry. The Royal Escort on horseback ensures their safety as the carriage travels up the Rue Royale/Koningsstraat, which is full of enthusiastic onlookers. They make their way to the Royal Palace where the royal family greets the crowd on the palace balcony on the Place des Palais. Further celebrations will take place in the country's major cities in the days following the ceremony, providing an opportunity for the entire population to show their support for the monarch.

=== Ceremony at the Congress Column ===
The royal couple proceeds to the Congress Column with a police escort. Upon arrival, the monarch greets the prime minister, the minister of Defense, and the army chiefs. In front of the Congress Column, he bows to the sound of the bugle before the Unknown Soldier's tomb and reignites the eternal flame. He pays tribute to the sound of La Brabançonne and then climbs into an open armored vehicle to inspect the troops. As the commander-in-chief of the armed forces and with the responsibility of maintaining the country's independence, this inspection is necessary. Once the ceremony is over and a parade is held for both the military and civilians (to celebrate the national holiday, not the swearing-in ceremony), the royal couple greets the crowds before returning to the royal palace.

== See also ==
=== Related articles ===
- Monarchy of Belgium
- Politics of Belgium
- fr:Roi des Belges
- fr:Histoire de la monarchie belge

=== Bibliography ===
- (in French) Christian Behrendt and Martin Vrancken, Principes de droit constitutionnel belge, Bruxelles, La Charte, 2021, 2nd ed.
- Robert Hazell and Bob Morris, The Role of Monarchy in Modern Democracy: European Monarchies compared, New York, Hart Studies in Comparative Public Law, 2022.
- (in French) Oscar Orban, Le droit constitutionnel de la Belgique, t. II, Liège, H. Dessain, 1908, chap. II ("L'institution monarchique").
- (in French) Henri Pirenne, Histoire de Belgique, vol. IV, Bruxelles, La Renaissance du livre, 1952.
- (in French) Marc Uyttendaele, Précis de droit constitutionnel belge, Bruxelles, Bruylant, 2005, 3e éd.
- ^{(nl)} Jan Velaers, De Grondwet: Een artikelsgewijze commentaar, vol. II: De machten (de federale staat, de gemeenschappen en de gewesten, Bruges, De Keure, 2019.
- (in French) Gustave Viatour and Alfred de Groote, Dictionnaire des honneurs, rangs et préséances, suivi du décret impérial du 24 messidor, an xii, annoté pour la Belgique, Gand, 1899 (OCLC 79286361).
