= Frédéric Basse =

Belgian politician (1785–1848)

Personal details
- Born: Frédéric Chrétien Basse; 25 February 1785 Brussels, Duchy of Brabant, Austrian Netherlands
- Died: 30 June 1848 (aged 63) Brussels metropolitan area, Kingdom of Belgium
- Occupation: Politician industrialist
- Awards: Order of the Netherlands Lion; Order of Leopold; Legion of Honour

Frédéric Basse (25 February 1785 – 30 June 1848) was a Belgian politician and industrialist.

== Biography ==
Frédéric Chrétien Basse was born in Brussels, Brabant, Austrian Netherlands (now Belgium) on 25 February 1785.

Following the revocation of the Edict of Nantes, Frédéric Basse's family, originally from France, emigrated to Westphalia. His father later settled in Brussels after Joseph II introduced civil tolerance in his States of the Netherlands. Frédéric's father founded a cotton printing factory, which Frédéric eventually developed into one of the country's leading establishments. The Brussels native took charge of the family calico printing business in 1807, introducing many technical innovations and improvements, among the first in Belgium. He was one of the first to print on copper plates. It is known that roller printing only came after.

The Congress of Vienna in 1815 brought Belgium into the United Kingdom of the Netherlands, and in 1817, Frédéric Basse joined the regency council of Brussels during King William I's reforms.

In Belgium, the industry of printing on cotton was carried out mainly in Brussels by Frédéric Basse and in Ghent by Auguste-Donat De Hemptinne. At the 1820 Ghent exhibition, Frédéric Basse was recommended for the gold medal in the dyeing and printing category. His factory's printed cotton, described as exceptionally fine and vibrant, earned high praise from the commission. Basse's mastery of manufacturing techniques and the quality of his products placed his factory ahead of the English competition.

Basse became a member of the Provincial States and a provincial councillor of the Province of Brabant in 1822. By 1825, he was called to join the board of directors of the General Society to Promote National Industry (French: Société générale pour faveur l'industrie nationale), established to oversee and promote national industry. He was involved with the industrial exhibition of Haarlem in 1825.

In 1826, Frédéric Basse, in partnership with Auguste-Donat De Hemptinne and Poelman-Hamelinck, introduced the guilloché lathe for printing rollers. Awarded the cross of the Order of the Netherlands Lion by King William I, he gained recognition for his contributions to cotton printing, particularly at the 1830 Exposition des produits de l'industrie belge, an industrial exhibition held in Brussels.

His position as a regency councillor of Brussels came to an end in 1830 in the wake of the Belgian Revolution and the declaration of independence by the Provisional Government of Belgium. The pillaging of his factory during this time contributed to its eventual closure.

In November 1831, he became a member of the Higher Commission of Industry (French: Commission Supérieure d'Industrie). The prominent manufacturer, served as Vice President of the Higher Commission of Industry, which had the authority to request information from public administrations, industry committees, and chambers of commerce through the Minister of the Interior. The commission was led by President Jacques Engler, a banker and senator from Brussels, and Frédéric Corbisier, a merchant from Mons, who acted as Secretary.

Frédéric Basse became the director of a savings bank in Antwerp which opened on 1 January 1832. He worked alongside Count Ferdinand de Meeûs, Governor and regency councillor, and several other directors. Basse was also part of a commission to revise the laws relating to assessing and collecting state taxes.

Basse later sought royal approval to establish the Company of the Cotton Industry (French: Société de l’industrie cotonnière) for Belgian cotton exports. The statutes of the company were drawn up before a royal notary in Brussels on 31 January 1834 and registered the following day. King Leopold authorized the company's formation in Ghent, with approval granted by decree following a report from the Minister of the Interior Charles Rogier in February 1834.

The provincial councilor was elected as a member of the Chamber of Representatives but later resigned in March 1834. Later in November 1834, Basse was among the founders of the Free University of Brussels.

He was involved in the steering committee for the 1835 Belgian Industrial Exhibition which was headed by then Mayor of Brussels Nicolas-Jean Rouppe. During its first session on 21 September, the committee elected Goswin de Stassart as president, Basse as vice president, and Louis Prosper Gachard as General Rapporteur by unanimous decision. The exhibition halls for national industrial products opened in Brussels on 16 September 1835. Basse closed his factory in 1835, unable to recover from the aftermath of the revolutionary days.

In 1836, Frédéric Basse was key in establishing the public limited company of the Upper and Lower Flénu Railways, approved by royal decree on 10 October. He proposed the construction of connecting branches to link the upper Haut-Flénu and lower Bas-Flénu railways with the Flénu to Sambre railway and formally requested the necessary concession. The Flénu region's industrial history, notably in coal mining, relied heavily on railways to move goods and resources throughout the industrial period. King Leopold I had named him a knight of the Order of Leopold on 23 October 1836.

Basse became the managing director of the Société Générale de Belgique in 1837, a key position in steering Belgium's industrial development. He acted as the co-director of many of the public limited companies founded by the society.

After the canalization of the Sambre River in 1837, he dedicated himself to the concession of the Sambre–Oise Canal to facilitate navigation between the Sambre in Belgium and the Oise River in France. As the agent for the companies of the canalized Sambre and the Sambre–Oise Canal, Basse negotiated an agreement on the navigation of the canalized Sambre with the Belgian Ministers of Public Works and Finance, representing the Belgian government. The negotiations held resulted in the Charleroi basin gaining a direct transportation route to Paris through the canalization effort. This result was important for France and Belgium in strengthening economic ties. The government of King Louis Philippe, wishing to recognize the part that Basse had taken in it, awarded him the cross of the Legion of Honour on 24 December 1841. On 18 March 1838, Basse and French merchant Alexandre Sanson-Davillier executed a private deed, which was registered in Paris on the 24th, and on 26 March 1838, their limited partnership was established under the name of the Société de la Sambre canalisée. By 1839, the director of the Société générale was the co-proprietor of the Monceau-Fontaine coal mine in Charleroi. His work on the Sambre-Oise Canal was significant for coal transport in Belgium during the Industrial Revolution. The Belgian Revolution negatively influenced the economy, and since that time, Basse borrowed extensively from the Société générale and other lenders, causing his debts to grow significantly.

In the early 1840s, Basse contributed to the management of the Museum of Arts and Industry (French: Musée de l'industrie) at the Palais de l'Industrie in the City of Brussels.

In March 1841, he was involved with the steering committee of the third Exposition des produits de l'industrie belge. The exhibition's committee was composed of François-Jean Wyns de Raucour, Charles de Brouckére. Auguste-Donat De Hemptinne, Garchard, and more. Basse was eventually appointed as the president of the jury, Mr. Orban as vice president, and Charles de Brouckère as secretary general of the jury. Basse became president of the Belgian Industry Committee on 6 October 1842.

Frédéric Basse, serving as vice president, participated in the Belgian Free Trade Association's first general meeting (French: Association du libre échange) on 11 October 1846, in Brussels at the Philharmonic Society hall. The provisional committee, with Basse alongside President Charles de Brouckère and Count Arrivabene as the other vice president, also included secretaries Charles Van Lede, Lehardy de Beaulieu, Delhasse, Léon Cans, Fortamps, Corr Vandermaeren, d'Hauregard, Jalheau, and Victor Faider.

== Death ==
Frédéric Basse died in the City of Brussels, Belgium on 30 June 1848. He committed suicide due to the significant debt that had accumulated since 1839.

== Honors ==
A street in the City of Brussels, Rue Frédéric Basse, was named after him on 17 October 1840.
