= Exhibition of Products of Belgian Industry =

Belgian national exhibition, 1830 to 1847

City of Brussels

Overview
- BIE-class: National exposition
- Name: Exposition des produits de l'industrie belge

Location
- Country: Belgium
- City: City of Brussels
- Venue: Palace of National Industry

Timeline
- Opening: 1830
- Closure: 1856

Specialized expositions

The Exhibition of Products of Belgian Industry (French: Exposition des produits de l'industrie belge), also known as the Exhibition of Belgian Industrial Products or simply the Belgian Industrial Exhibition, was a national exhibition that took place in Belgium, devoted solely to the products of the national industry. The Belgian industrial exhibitions were held between 1830 and 1856.

== History ==
Around 1815, global trade links disrupted by the American Revolution, French Revolution, and the Continental Blockade were gradually being reestablished. Belgium, asserting itself as an industrial power, concentrated on industry during the 1830s, particularly in the wake of the Belgian Revolution. Minister Charles Rogier introduced the idea of fostering the various branches of industry like the arts, encouraging the exhibition of foreign and Belgian products. A concept proposed and first carried out in France by Nicolas François de Neufchâteau as the Exposition des produits de l'industrie française (English: Exhibition of Products of French Industry). The goal of an exhibition in Belgium was to promote Belgian craftsmanship and strengthen its economic and industrial ties with other countries.

=== 1st exposition (1830) ===
The National Exhibition of Products of Belgian Industry was first held in the City of Brussels, in the Kingdom of Belgium in 1830, amid its separation from the Netherlands. Drawing a large crowd from both the kingdom and abroad, the exhibition at the Palace of National Industry featured 1,020 exhibitors, with 813 Belgians submitting their products. Showcased were Tournai's tapestries, machines from Liège and Brussels, and fabrics from cities like Antwerp, Ghent, Bruges, Ypres, Courtrai, and Verviers.

=== 2nd exposition (1835) ===
The idea of another industrial exhibition emerged, giving different localities of the Kingdom of Belgium a chance to present their natural resources and specialized manufactured goods to the public. Following Leopold I's decrees on 30 July 1834 and 7 January 1835 relating to the exhibition of products of national industry, the Exhibition of National Industry Products was officially announced and scheduled to open in September 1835. Belgium's Minister of Interior Barthélémy de Theux de Meylandt was tasked with the execution of the decrees. Nicolas-Jean Rouppe, Mayor of Brussels, was the chairman of the organizing committee. A jury of 25 members, appointed on 30 July 1834, included Goswin de Stassart, Frédéric Basse, Félix Bethune, Raymond de Biolley, John Cockerill, François-Philippe Cauchy, Pierre Joseph David-Fischbach, Louis Prosper Gachard, Léopold Lefebvre, and Adolphe Quetelet. Among them, a president, vice-president, and general secretary were elected.

The exhibition of Belgian industrial products was held on 16 September 1835 at the Palace of National Industry in Brussels, with products exhibited in the six large rooms of the palace. At the opening ceremony, Barthélémy de Theux de Meylandt, Minister of the Interior, delivered a speech. It was attended by Brabant governor Goswin de Stassart, Jean-Joseph Raikem, and Auguste Duvivier, along with members of the Senate of Belgium and the Chamber of Representatives.

=== 3rd exposition (1841) ===
A royal decree of 28 July 1840 constituted the exhibition of Belgian industrial products in 1841. Belgian Interior Minister Charles Liedts was assigned to oversee the decrees. An organizing committee included Brussels Mayor Guillaume Van Volxem, Frédéric Basse, Charles de Brouckère, Auguste-Donat De Hemptinne, and more. The committee, established on 5 March 1841, had the duty of appointing a president, treasurer, and secretary from its members. On 10 March 1841, the committee elected Mayor Van Volxem as its president, Frédéric Basse as its vice president, Auguste t'Kint as honorary treasurer, and Louis Prosper Gachard as the general secretary with François-Jean Wyns de Raucour taking over for Van Volxem on 25 July 1841 after succeeding him as mayor. By August, a jury of nearly 40 members was appointed to evaluate the exhibited products and award merit prizes, distinctions, or honorable mentions to the kingdom's manufacturers, artists, and craftsmen. On 15 July 1841, the Exhibition of Belgian Industrial Products was held in Brussels. Exhibitors represented the Belgian provinces of Brabant, West Flanders, East Flanders, Hainaut, Liège, Limburg, Luxembourg, and Namur.

=== 4th exposition (1847) ===
On 4 January 1847, a royal decree by Leopold I of Belgium established a fourth public exhibition of the products of the national industry to be opened in Brussels on 1 July 1847. At that time, Barthélémy de Theux de Meylandt was the Minister of Interior and was tasked with executing the order. The commission, established in February 1847 to oversee the exhibition, included Brussels Mayor François-Jean Wyns de Raucour, Charles de Brouckère, A. Blabs, François Coppens, Isidore Doucet, Auguste De Hemptinne, H.J. Froidmont, L.P. Gachard (who later resigned), J.B. Jobard, Kindt, H. Schumacher, Louis Spaak, and Jacob Verreyt. The commission was presided over by Wyns de Racour, with de Brouchkére as vice president, H. Schumacher as treasurer, and Auguste Blaes as general secretary. In the City of Brussels, Belgium, the fourth exhibition of Belgian Industrial Products took place on 15 July 1847. The industrial products admitted to the 1847 Exhibition were divided into four divisions with members of the organizing committee as the head curator of each division. The first division focused on manufactures, fabrics, and threads; the second on tools, machines, metals, leathers, bodywork, and saddlery; the third on ceramic arts, surgical and precision instruments, chemicals, cupware, and watchmaking; and the fourth on musical instruments, bronzes, jewelry, crystalware, furniture, stationery, lithography, binding, and more.

== See also ==
- Exposition des produits de l'industrie française
