= Charles-Auguste Fraikin =

Belgian curator and sculptor

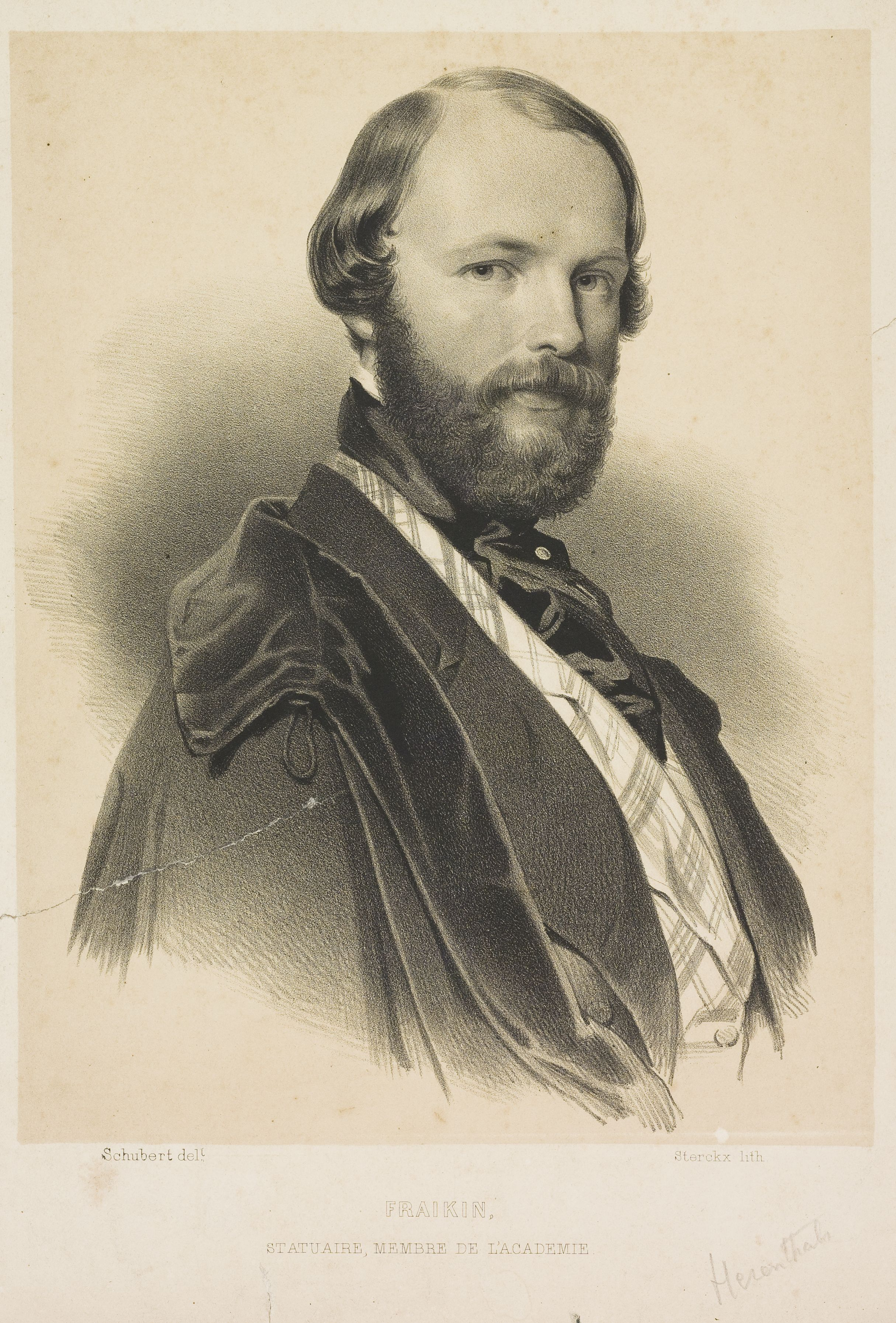
Charles Auguste Fraikin

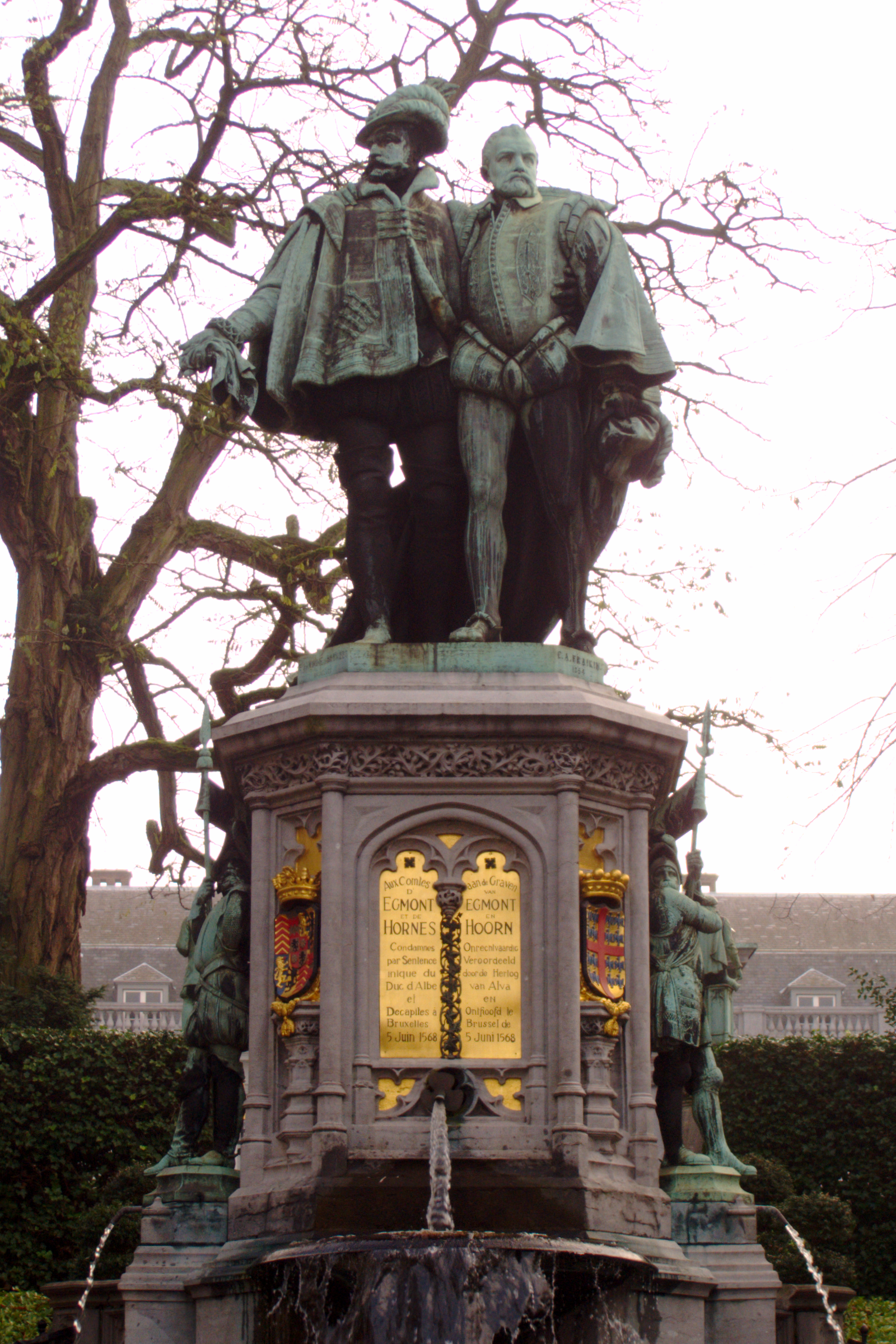
Statue of the Counts of Egmont and Horn (1864)

Charles Auguste Fraikin (14 June 1817 – 22 November 1893) was a Belgian neoclassical sculptor.

== Life ==
Charles Auguste Fraikin was born in Herentals, United Kingdom of the Netherlands (modern-day Belgium), on 14 June 1817. He took drawing lessons from the age of twelve at the Royal Academy of Fine Arts in Antwerp. When he was thirteen, his father died. Fraikin therefore opted for practical training as a pharmacist. He worked in the pharmacy of Auguste-Donat De Hemptinne, brother-in-law of François-Joseph Navez, painter and director of the Brussels Academy, who discovered his talent and encouraged him to continue in the arts.

At the Brussels Salon in 1845, Fraikin won a gold medal for the sculpture L'amour captif. Marble versions of it were later placed in the Royal Museums of Fine Arts of Belgium and the Hermitage. It brought him to the attention of the Belgian royal family, which led to new commissions. Among other things, he made a statue of King Leopold I.

In addition to being a sculptor, Fraikin was also curator of the sculpture department of the Royal Museums of Fine Arts of Belgium.

At the end of his life, he had donated his collection of plaster models to the city of Herentals. He witnessed the opening of his museum in the Cloth hall of Herentals. He died on 22 November 1893 in Schaerbeek. After a church funeral, he was buried close to the choir of Saint-Waldetrudis Church.

== Incomplete list of works ==
Brussels:

- Allegory of the City of Brussels (1848), Place Rouppe/Rouppeplein
- Monument to the Counts of Egmont and Horn (1864), Square du Petit Sablon/Kleine Zavelsquare
- Eleven portal images for Brussels' Town Hall
- Mausoleum of Félix de Mérode in the Cathedral of St. Michael and St. Gudula
- Funerary statue of Ferdinand Nicolay at Laeken Cemetery

Dendermonde:

- Monument of Father Pierre-Jean De Smet (1878), Church of Our Lady

Ostend:

- Mausoleum for Louise of Orléans (1859), Sint-Petrus-en-Pauluskerk

== Gallery ==
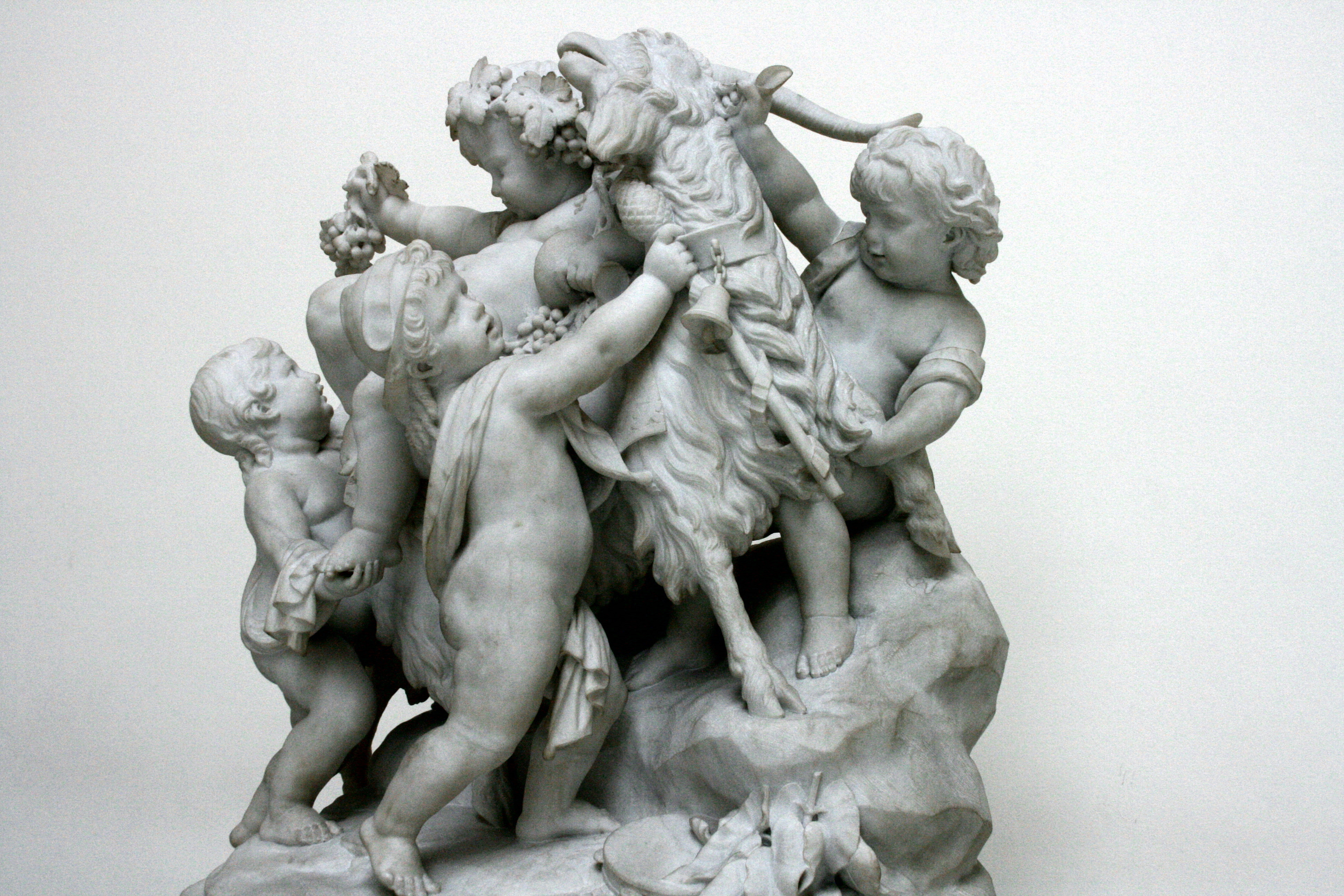
Triumph of Bacchus

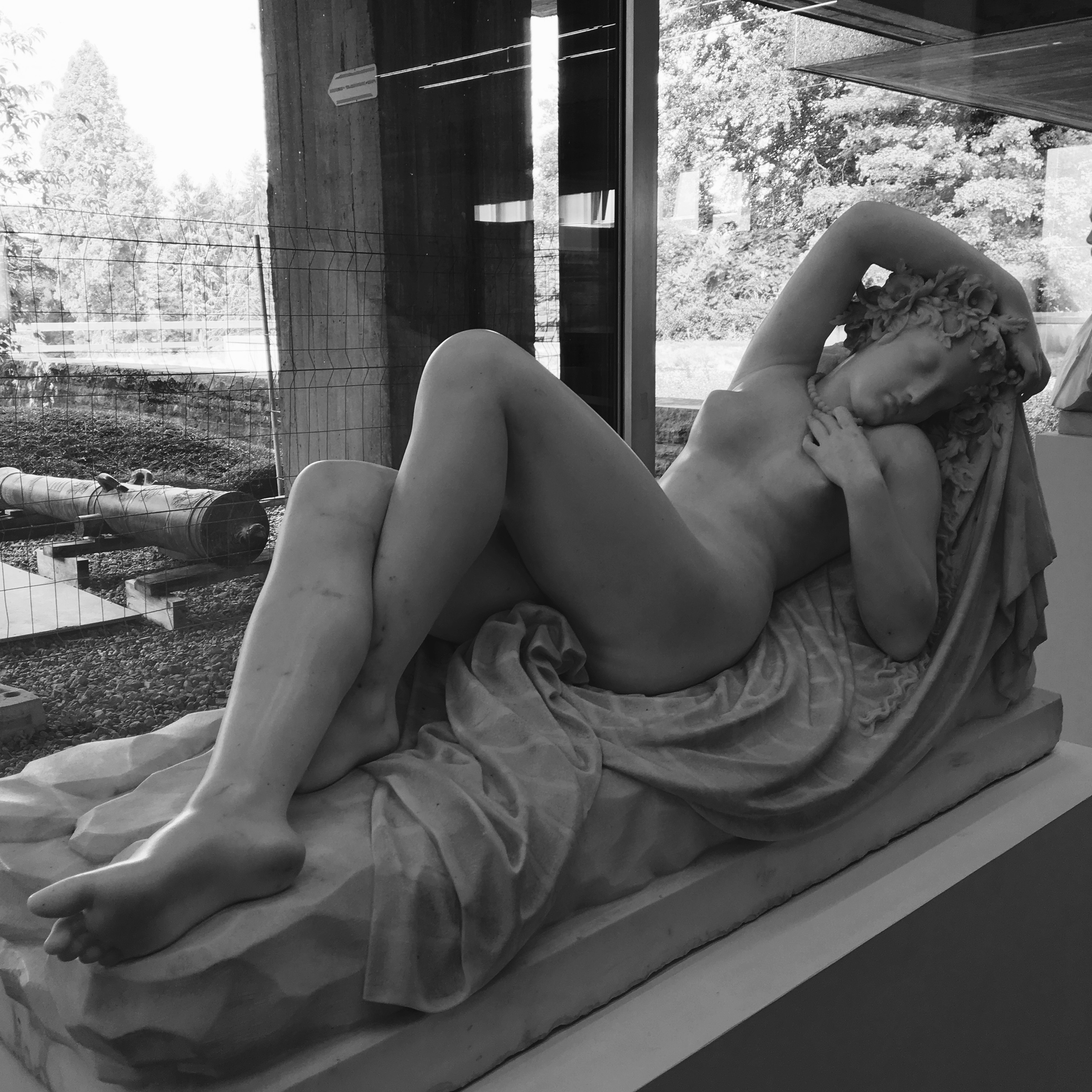
Sleep or Morpheus

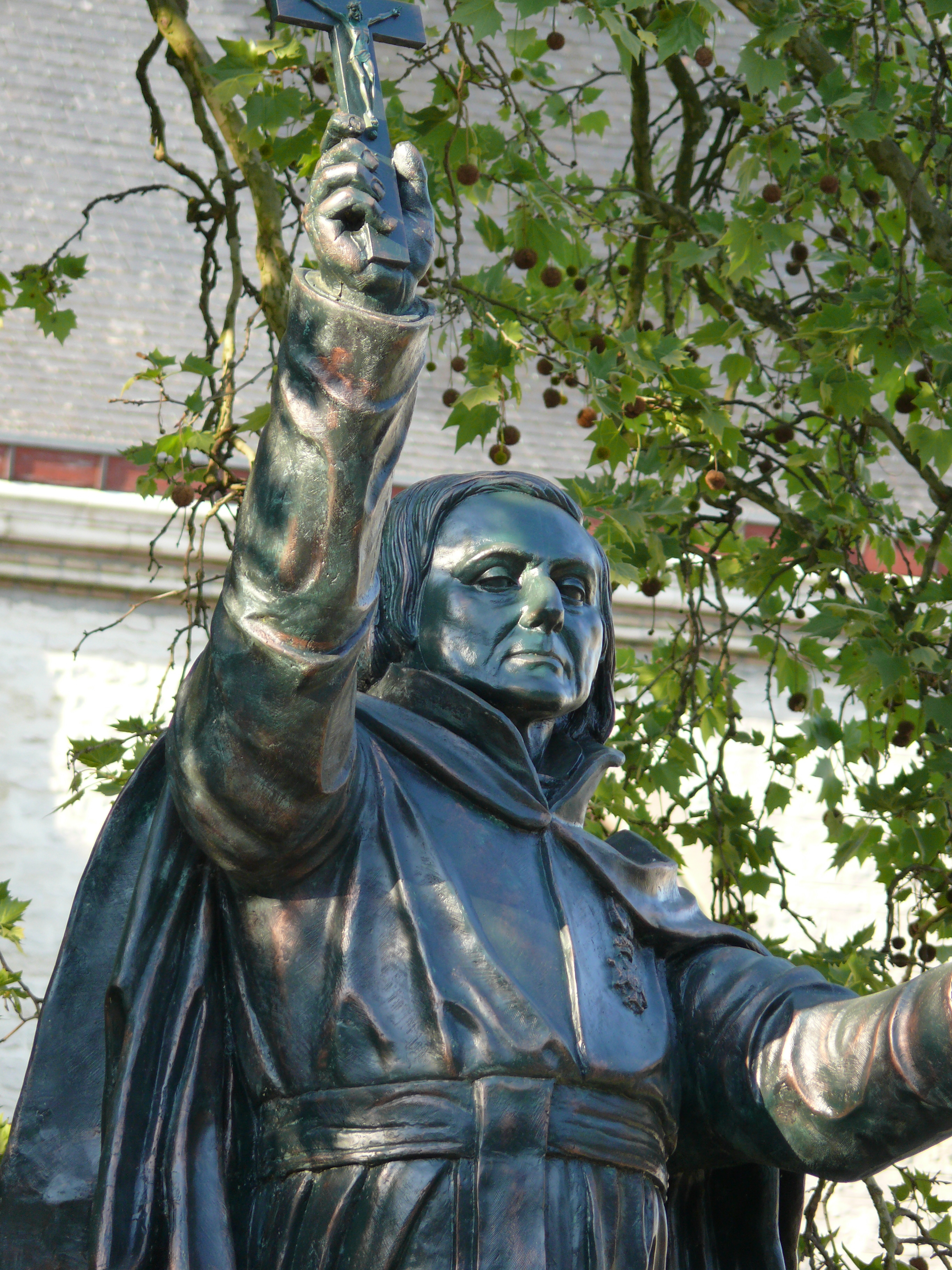
Statue of Pieter-Jan de Smet

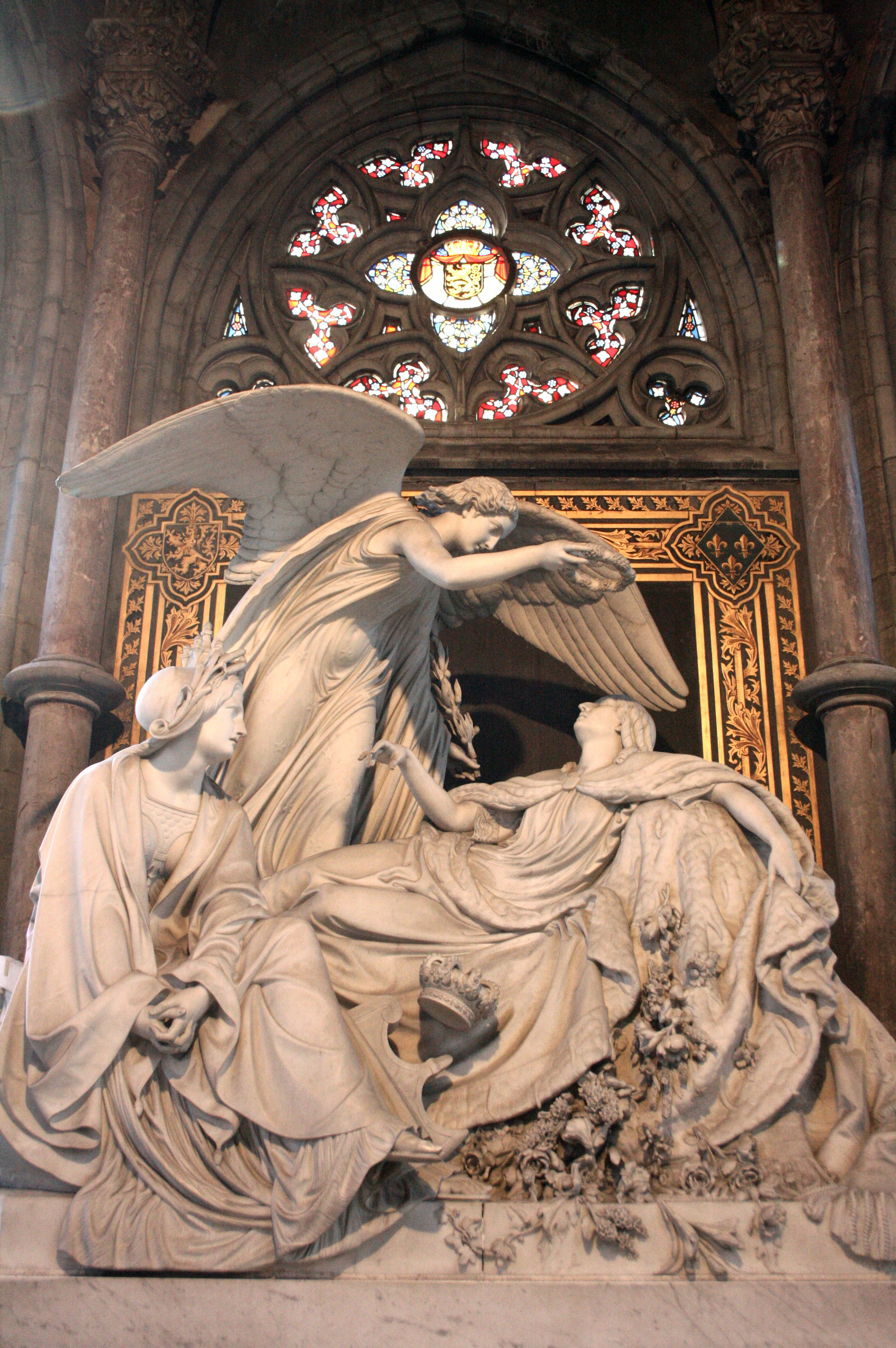
Tomb of Queen Louise

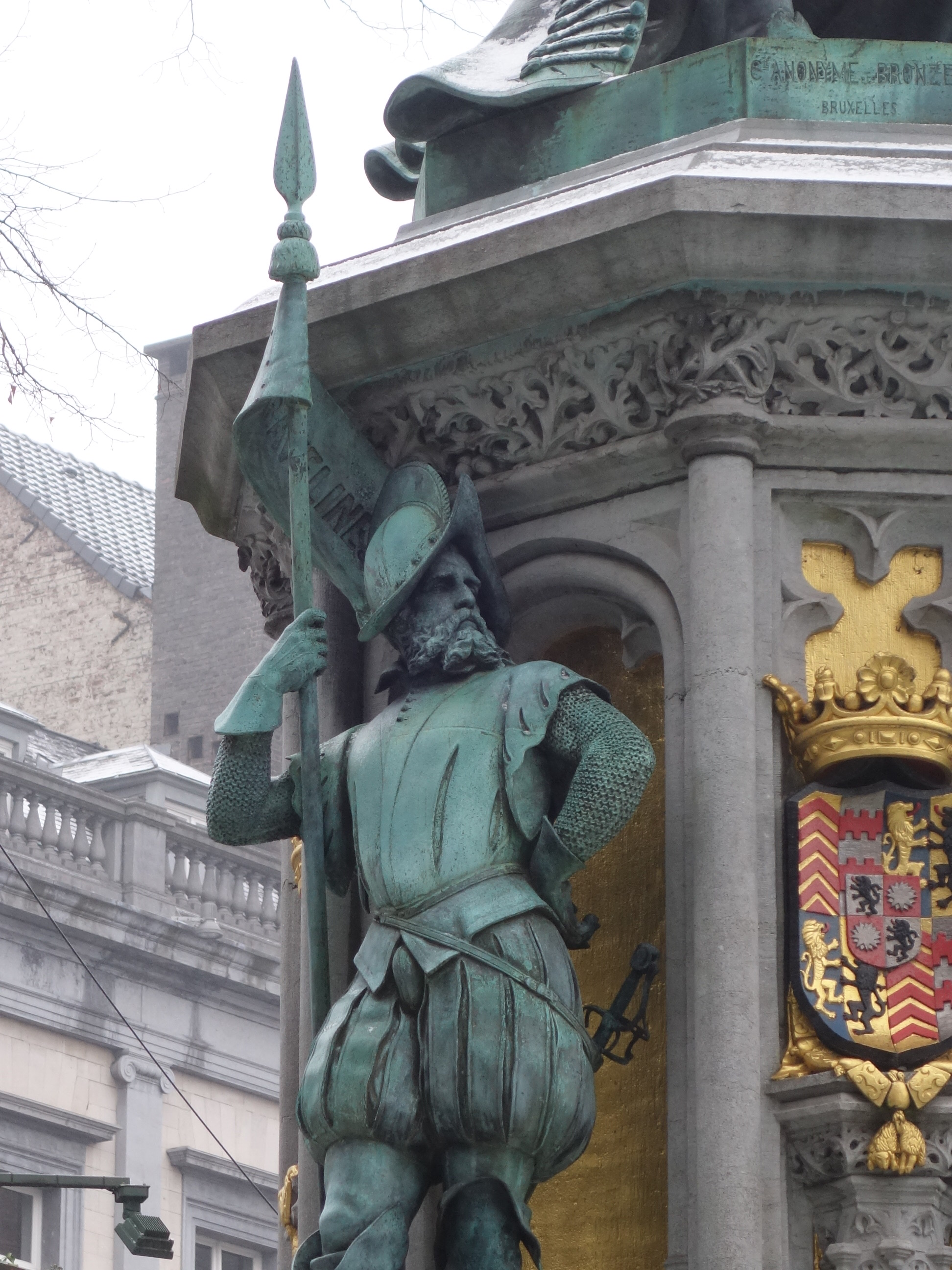
Detail of the Monument to Egmont and Horn

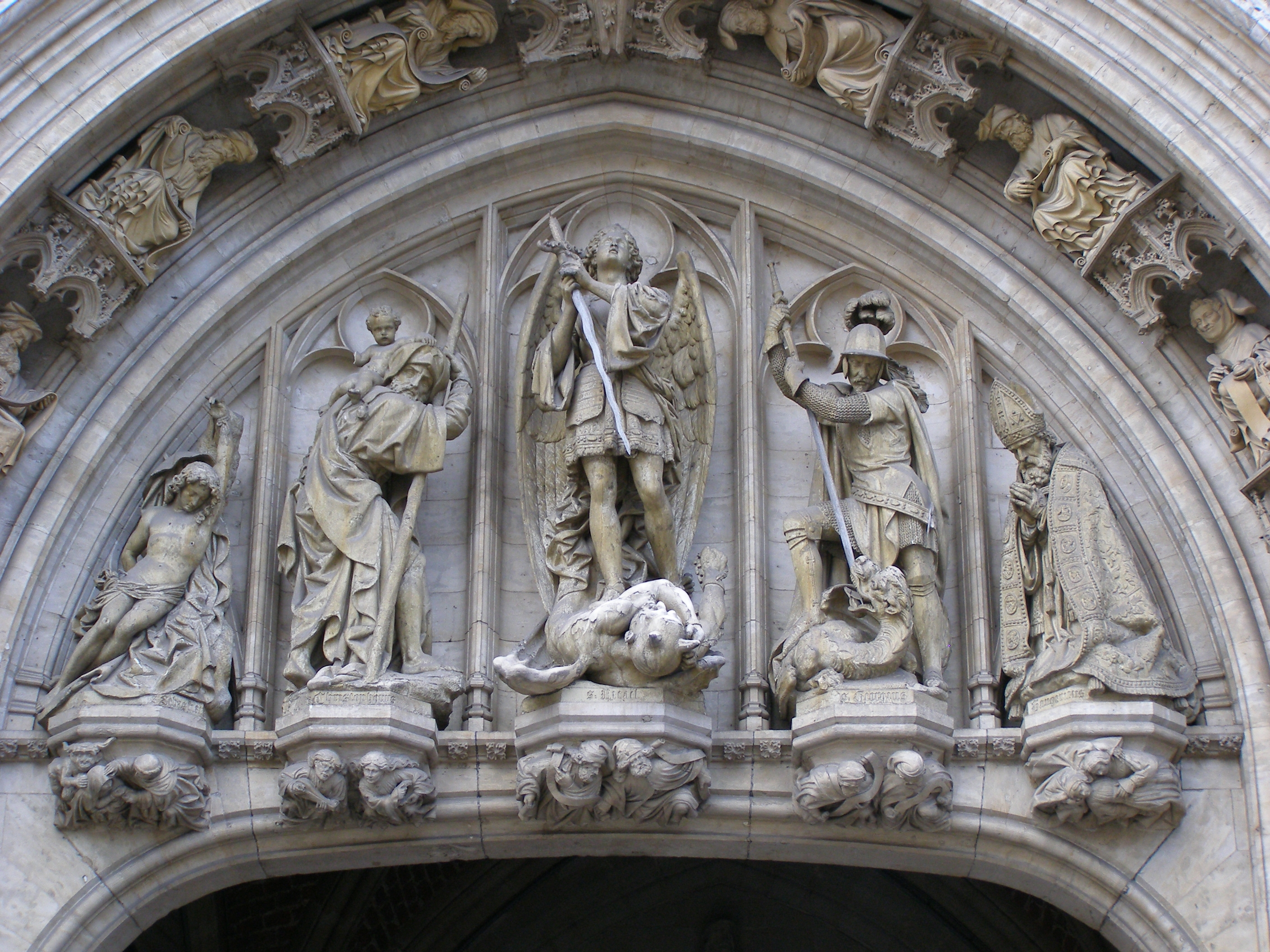
Brussels' Town Hall portal
