= Comme chez Soi =

Restaurant in Brussels, Belgium

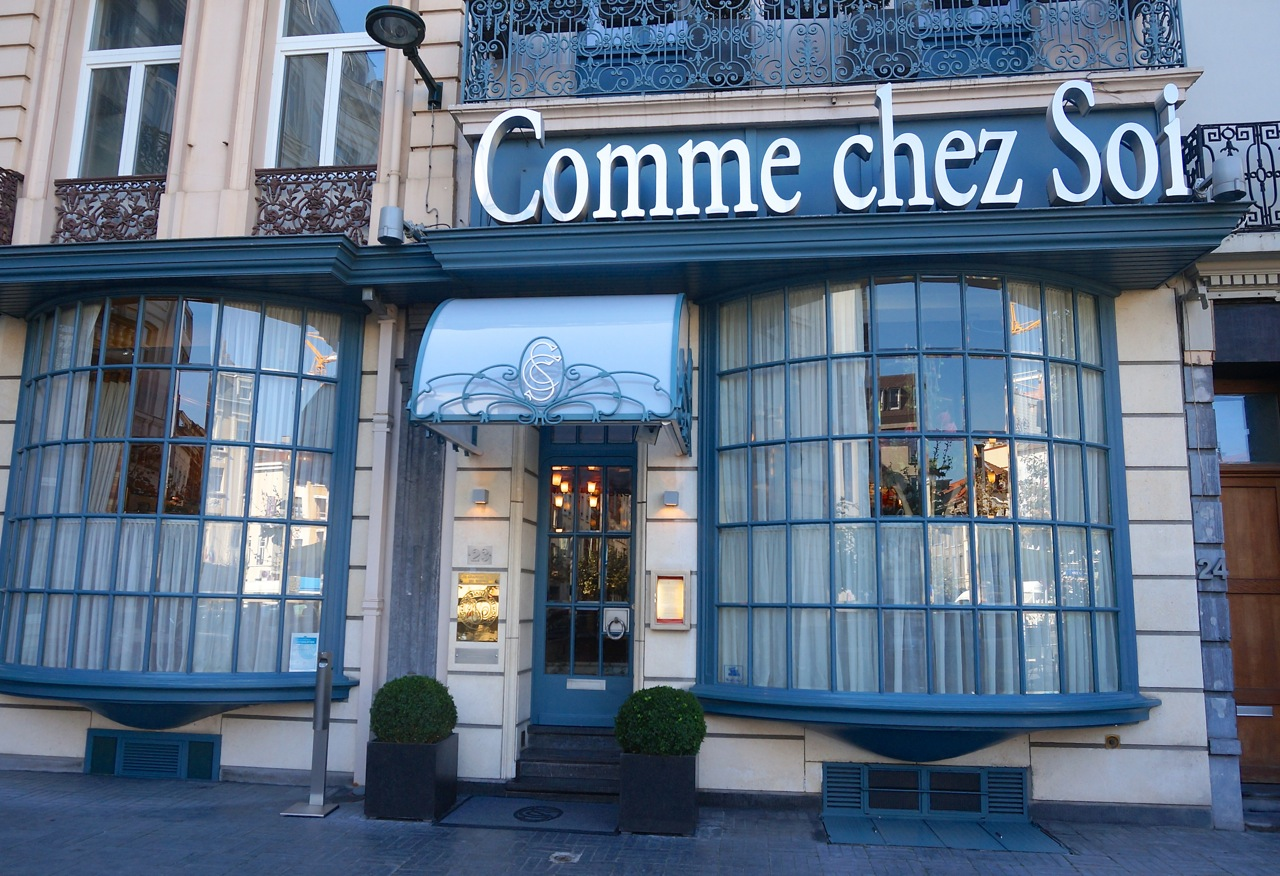

Restaurant information
- Established: 1926
- Head chef: Lionel Rigolet
- Pastry chef: Charlotte Aversa
- Rating: Michelin Guide; 17,5/20 (Gault Millau)
- Location: Place Rouppe / Rouppeplein 23, 1000 City of Brussels, Brussels-Capital Region, Belgium
- Coordinates: 50.8423°N 4.3459°E
- Website: commechezsoi.be

Comme Chez Soi is a restaurant in Brussels, Belgium, which has garnered 2 Michelin star in its lifespan. The chef is Lionel Rigolet, Gault Millau's Belgian Chef of the Year 2007.

The restaurant was founded in 1926 by Georges Cuvelier, originally a coal miner from the Belgian Borinage region. In the 1930s, it moved to its present location, an Art Nouveau house at the Place Rouppe/Rouppeplein in central Brussels, where it obtained its first Michelin star in 1953. For 27 years (as of 1979), it was rated with three stars. In 2006, it was downgraded to two stars after chef and owner Pierre Wynants announced he would step down in favour of his son-in-law, Lionel Rigolet. In 2022, Comme chez Soi lost another star, currently rated with one Michelin star.

== Generations of chefs ==
- Georges Cuvelier
- Louis Wynants, Cuvelier's son-in-law
- Pierre Wynants
- Lionel Rigolet

== Michelin Stars ==
- 1953: one star (Georges Cuvelier)
- 1966: two stars (Louis Wynants)
- 1979: three stars (Pierre Wynants)
- 2006: two stars (Lionel Rigolet)
- 2022: one star (Lionel Rigolet)

== Trivia ==
The restaurant's name translates as "just like home". The name came about in its early years, when a patron told Cuvelier by way of compliment "Georges, in your restaurant one eats like at home". Up to then, the restaurant had simply been called "Chez Georges".
