= Charles de Brouckère =

Belgian liberal politician and mayor of Brussels (1796–1860)

Jonkheer Charles de Brouckère
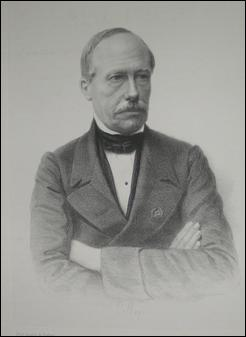

Mayor of Brussels
- In office 5 October 1848 – 20 April 1860
- Preceded by: François-Jean Wyns de Raucour
- Succeeded by: André-Napoléon Fontainas

Personal details
- Born: Charles Joseph Marie Ghislain de Brouckère; 18 January 1796 Bruges, Austrian Netherlands
- Died: 20 April 1860 (aged 64) Brussels, Belgium
- Party: Liberal Party
- Education: Free University of Brussels (honorific)
- Occupation: Politician, nobleman

Jonkheer Charles Joseph Marie Ghislain de Brouckère (French pronunciation: [ʃaʁl ʒozɛf maʁi ɡilɛ̃ də bʁukɛʁ]; 18 January 1796 – 20 April 1860) was a Belgian nobleman, liberal politician and mayor of the City of Brussels.

== Life ==
Born in Bruges, elder brother of future Prime Minister of Belgium Henri de Brouckère, Charles entered politics in the period when modern Belgium formed the southern part of the United Kingdom of the Netherlands. He worked as a banker in Maastricht and served as a representative for the province of Limburg in the Second Chamber of parliament.

During the Belgian Revolution of 1830, De Brouckère was a member of the francophile and francophone party, which favoured annexation by France. In the newly independent Belgium, he served as Finance Minister, Interior Minister, and War Minister, for short periods in 1831. He taught as a professor at the Free University of Brussels, and in 1848 became burgomaster of Brussels, a post he held continuously until his death. He is interred at Brussels Cemetery.

== Legacy ==
De Brouckère was responsible for major urban renewal in Brussels, including the creation of water mains, as well as the first boulevards in the city. The Place de Brouckère/De Brouckèreplein, and De Brouckère metro station, in central Brussels, are named after him.

== Honours ==
- Belgium: Iron Cross.
- Belgium: Grand Officer in the Order of Leopold

== See also ==
- List of mayors of the City of Brussels
- List of defence ministers of Belgium

== Sources ==
- Du Bois, A., Les Bourgmestres de Bruxelles. Ch. de Brouckère, in : Revue de Belgique, mei 1896, pp. 21–41.
- Juste, Théodore, Charles de Brouckère, Brussel, C. Muquardt, 1867, p. 131.
