= René Sheridan =

Belgian lawywe (1873-1928)

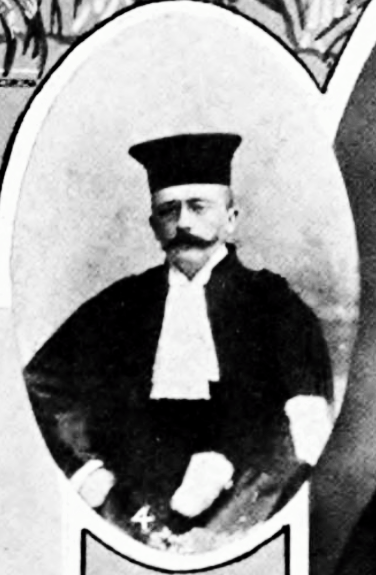
- From a 1908 publication
- Born: 1873; Bruges
- Died: 10 September 1928 (aged 55); Bangkok
- Education: Brussels University
- Occupations: Lawyer and judge
- Years active: 1901-1928

René Sheridan (1873 – 10 September 1928) was a Belgian lawyer and judge who served in the Ministry of Justice of Siam from 1902 to 1928.

== Early life ==
Sheridan was born in 1873 in Bruges, and was educated at Brussels University receiving in 1899 his degree of Doctor of Law. He then returned to Bruges as a Fellow of the Bar.

== Career ==
Sheridan went to West Africa, shortly after qualifying, as first Substitut du Procureur d'Etàt, and subsequently served as a judge in the Congo.

After a year, he returned to Europe and accepted an appointment with the government of Siam. He arrived in Siam on 2 June 1902 and joined the Ministry of Justice as assistant legal adviser. In 1905, he was appointed judge of the Appeal Court, Bangkok, remaining in the position until 1928. The title of Phya Vides Dharmamontri was given to him by King Vajiravudh in the Birthday Honours of January 1925. He died in Bangkok in 1928.

== Honours ==
- Knight Commander of the Most Illustrious Order of the Chula Chom Clau, with the Golden Vase or "Phan Thong".
- Second Class Order of the White Elephant, and Second Class Order of the Crown of Siam.
- Knight of the Order of Leopold, and Knight of the Order of the Crown of Belgium.
- Knight of the Legion d'Honneur of France.
