= Pierre Wynants =

Belgian chef

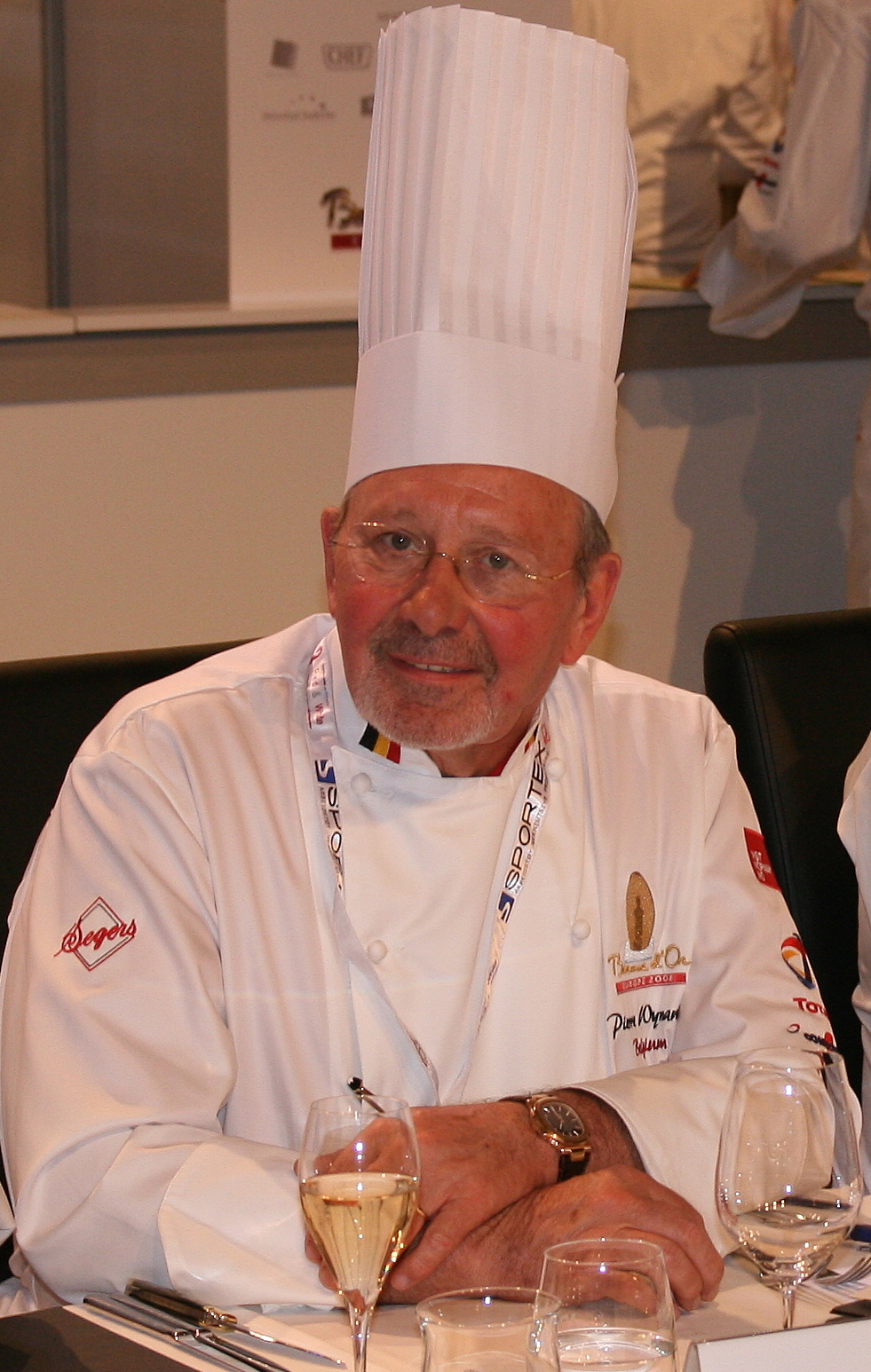
Pierre Wynants in Stavanger 2008

Pierre Wynants (born 5 March 1939) is a Belgian chef. He owned and led the Comme chez Soi restaurant in Brussels.

Under his ownership, the restaurant held three Michelin stars from 1979 until 2006.

In 2004, he created the menu of the Ostend Queen establishment. This restaurant received a rather good review in the 2005 Benelux edition Michelin restaurant guide (or Benelux Michelin Guide), although the restaurant had not opened at the time of publication of the guide. This breach of the renowned guide's rules created quite a stir in the Belgian press, particularly in Le Soir. Shortly after this scandal, the managers of the France-based restaurant guide recalled all fifty thousand copies of the newly published guide.

In 2007 he passed over control of Comme chez Soi to his son-in-law Lionel Rigolet.

== See also ==
- Belgian cuisine
