= Split of the Catholic University of Leuven =

Separation of the university along linguistic lines after civil unrest in 1967–68

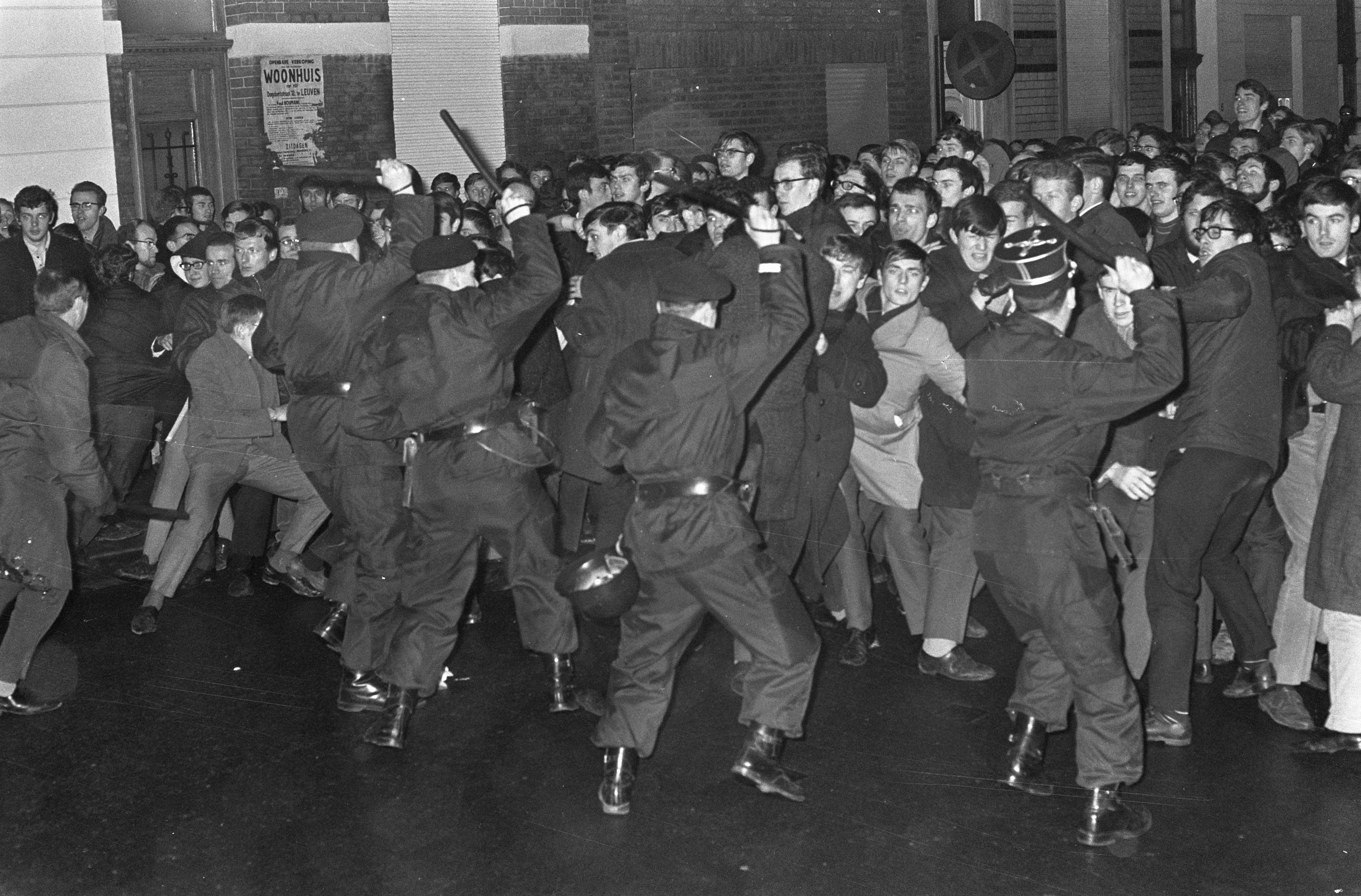
Flemish students and Gendarmes clash at Leuven in January 1968

The Catholic University of Leuven was one of Belgium's major universities. It split along linguistic lines after a period of civil unrest in 1967–68 commonly known as the Leuven Affair (Affaire de Louvain) in French and Flemish Leuven (Leuven Vlaams), based on a contemporary slogan, in Dutch. The crisis shook Belgian politics and led to the fall of the government of Paul Vanden Boeynants. It marked an escalation of the linguistic tension in Belgium after World War II and had lasting consequences for other bilingual institutions in Belgium within higher education and politics alike. In 1970 the first of several state reforms occurred, marking the start of Belgium's transition to a federal state.

== Background ==
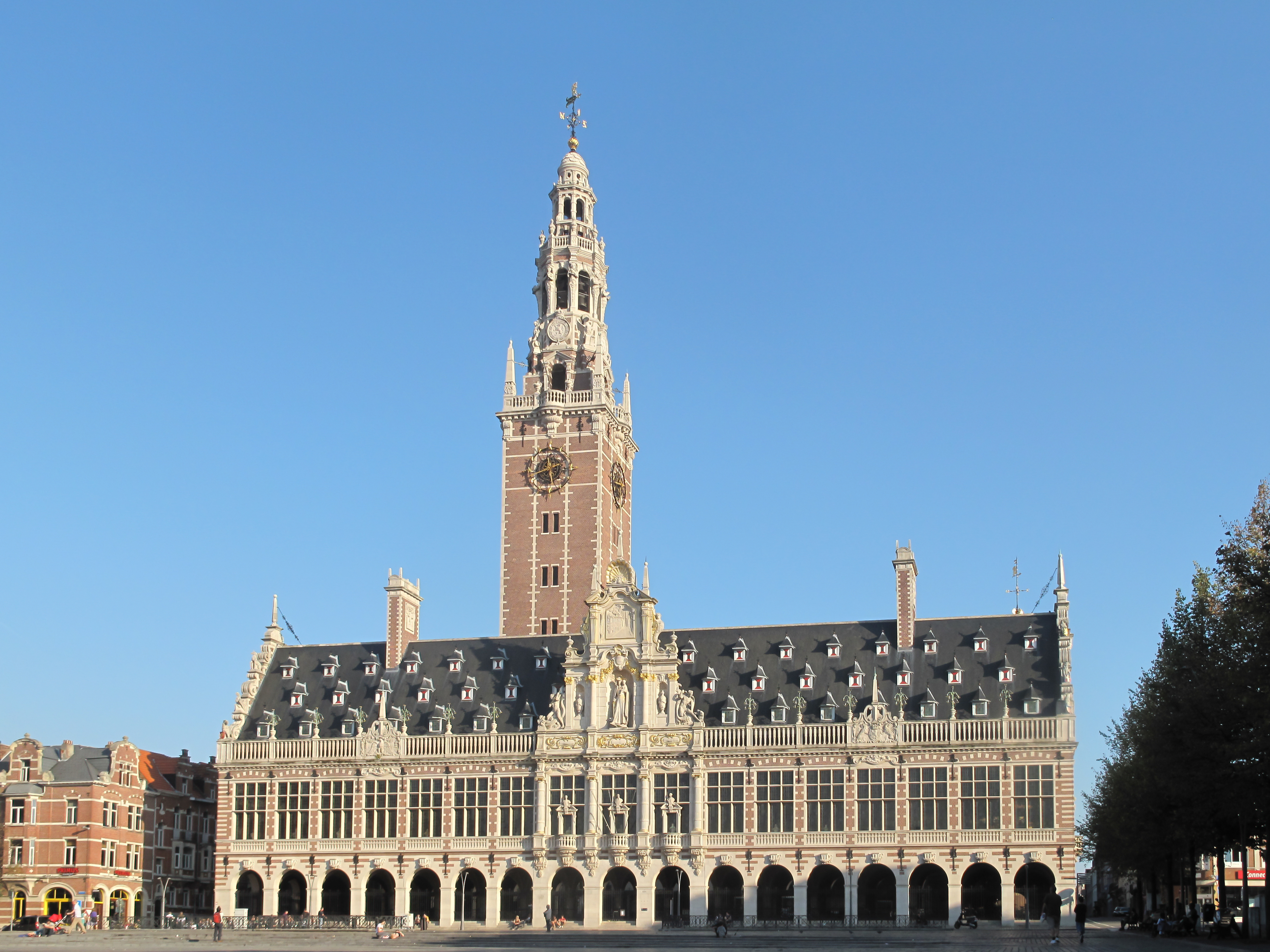
The historic library of the Catholic University of Leuven, rebuilt after its destruction by the German Army in 1914, was a symbol of Belgian national identity

Belgium became independent in 1830 with a population primarily divided between French and Dutch speakers, at roughly 40% and 60%, respectively. However, French was privileged as the lingua franca of the bourgeoisie and high culture across the country. This was reflected in the Catholic University of Leuven, founded in 1835, which for most of its existence taught classes in French only, despite being situated in Dutch-speaking Flanders.

During the nineteenth century, the Flemish Movement had emerged in Flanders to demand an enhanced status for the Dutch language. Provision of Dutch language higher education had been a major demand, especially at Ghent University where a faction of Flamingants during the German occupation in World War I collaborated with the Germans to create a Dutch-language university in 1916. Ghent University was finally confirmed as a Dutch-language institution in 1930. From the same year, teaching at Leuven began to be provided separately in French and Dutch.

The Flemish Movement made significant advances after World War II, especially in the early 1960s. Their objective increasingly switched from bilingualism to regional unilingualism, a principle recognised by the Gilson laws of 1962. This made the French and Dutch sections in Leuven effectively autonomous but Flamingants demanded that the university be formally split. These demands became increasingly vocal after 1967.

The 1960s were also a time of unrest among the youth across Europe and the world, characterised by student protests and "counterculture". In France, this culminated in student unrest in May 1968. Student dissatisfaction was exacerbated by a rapid increase in the number of students in many universities without an accompanying increase in facilities.

== Crisis, November 1967–June 1968 ==
The Leuven issue was raised on 5 November 1967 when about 30,000 Flemish activists marched in Antwerp to demand that the Catholic University become monolingual. They were supported by some parliamentarians from the Flemish wing of the Christian Social Party (CVP). Following the success of the Antwerp demonstration, Flemish students marched in Leuven to advocate similar demands. They carried banners reading "Walloons out" (Walen buiten) and "Flemish Leuven" (Leuven Vlaams) which shocked many French-speaking conservatives. In response, many French-speaking students travelled to the tiny hamlet of Houte-Si-Plou in French-speaking Wallonia to create a satirical "University of Houte-Si-Plou". Violent demonstrations continued in Leuven.

The government of Paul Vanden Boeynants and the Catholic Church opposed the split and attempted to find a compromise, but this became impossible once the attitudes of both sides hardened. Negotiations between the two factions in January and February 1968 collapsed when the Bishop of Bruges, Emiel Jozef De Smedt, gave a public speech advocating a split. This appeared to mark a break in the Church's position. On 6 February, the Vanden Boeynants coalition government collapsed as a result of the crisis.

The general elections which followed in March 1968 brought the government of Gaston Eyskens to power. He released a government declaration on 24 June, announcing that the French section would move out of Leuven. The French section demanded that the Flemish section fund its relocation, since it had not demanded it. A plan was agreed for its relocation to a planned town in Wallonia, dubbed "New Leuven" (Louvain-la-Neuve). The university's split was formalised soon afterwards, creating two new universities: the Université catholique de Louvain (UCL) and the Katholieke Universiteit Leuven (KUL).

== Aftermath ==
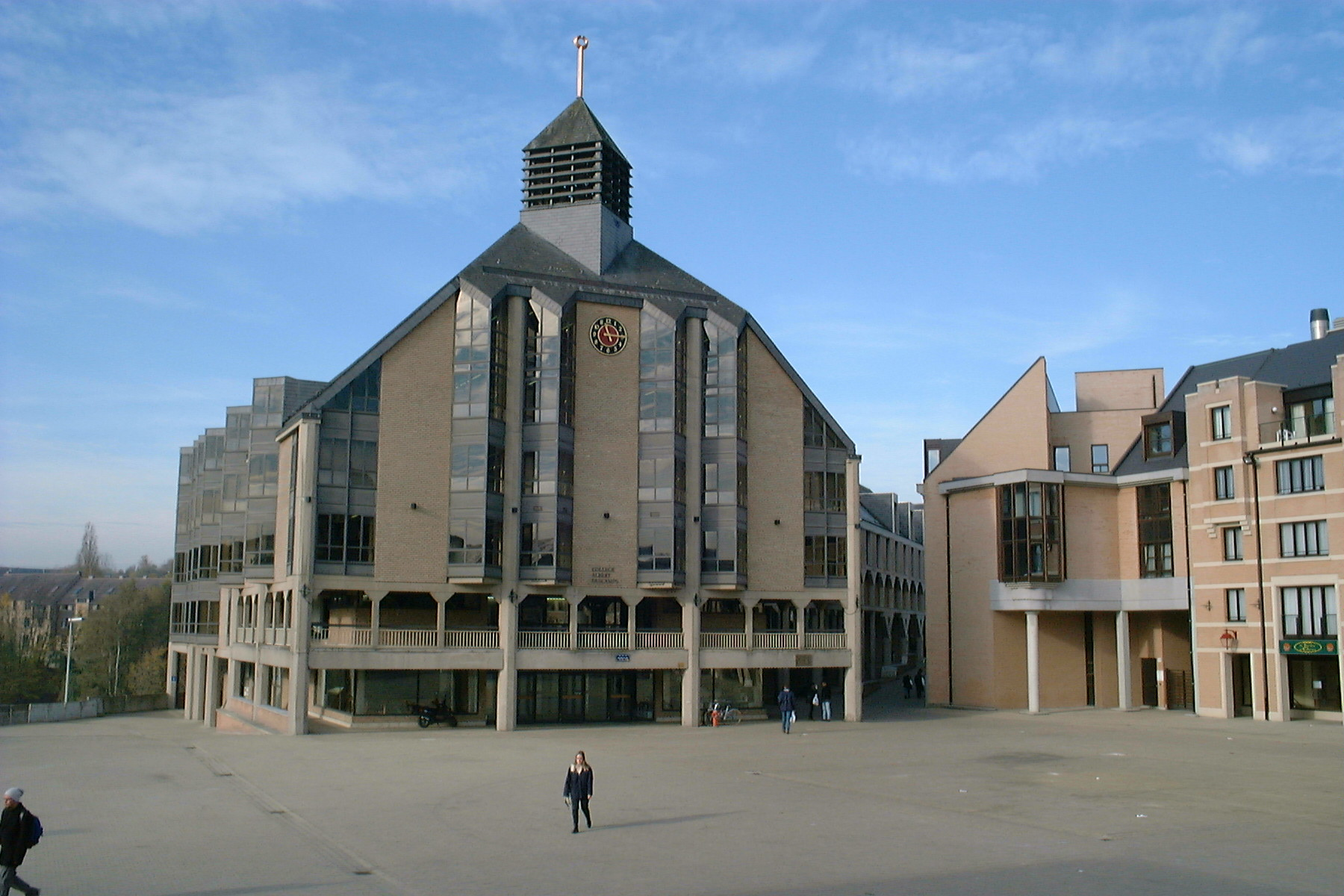
View of Louvain-la-Neuve, a planned town built after 1971 to accommodate the French section of the university

Work on the construction of Louvain-la-Neuve began in 1971. UCL relocated to the town soon afterwards, and it remains there to this day.

The Leuven affair marked the start of a series of institutional splits along linguistic lines. The Free University of Brussels, founded in 1834, split along linguistic lines in 1969, creating the Université libre de Bruxelles (ULB) and Vrije Universiteit Brussel (VUB). In politics, the Leuven affair revealed a split between French- and Dutch-speaking factions within the Christian Social Party, especially in the 1968 elections where both factions had campaigned on different manifestos. The split was formalised in 1972 when the old party split along linguistic lines into the Parti social chrétien and Christelijke Volkspartij. Similar trends were reflected in other major parties, including the Liberal Party which had divided in 1961 and formally split in 1972. The Belgian Socialist Party survived intact until 1978 when it also split. The Leuven crisis also led to the rapid rise of regionalist political parties, such as the Volksunie in Flanders and the Front Démocratique des Francophones in Brussels.

In 1970, the Eyskens government passed the first state reform marking the start of Belgium's move towards a federal state. The reforms created three autonomous "communities" with responsibility for cultural issues such as public broadcasting.

== See also ==
- Second School War (1950–59), a Belgian political crisis over the issue of religion in education.
- Belgian general strike of 1960–61
- Congo Crisis (1960–65)
- List of split up universities
- October Crisis
