= Palace of National Industry =

Exhibition hall in Brussels, Belgium

- Palais de l'Industrie nationale (French); Paleis van de Nationale Industrie (Dutch)
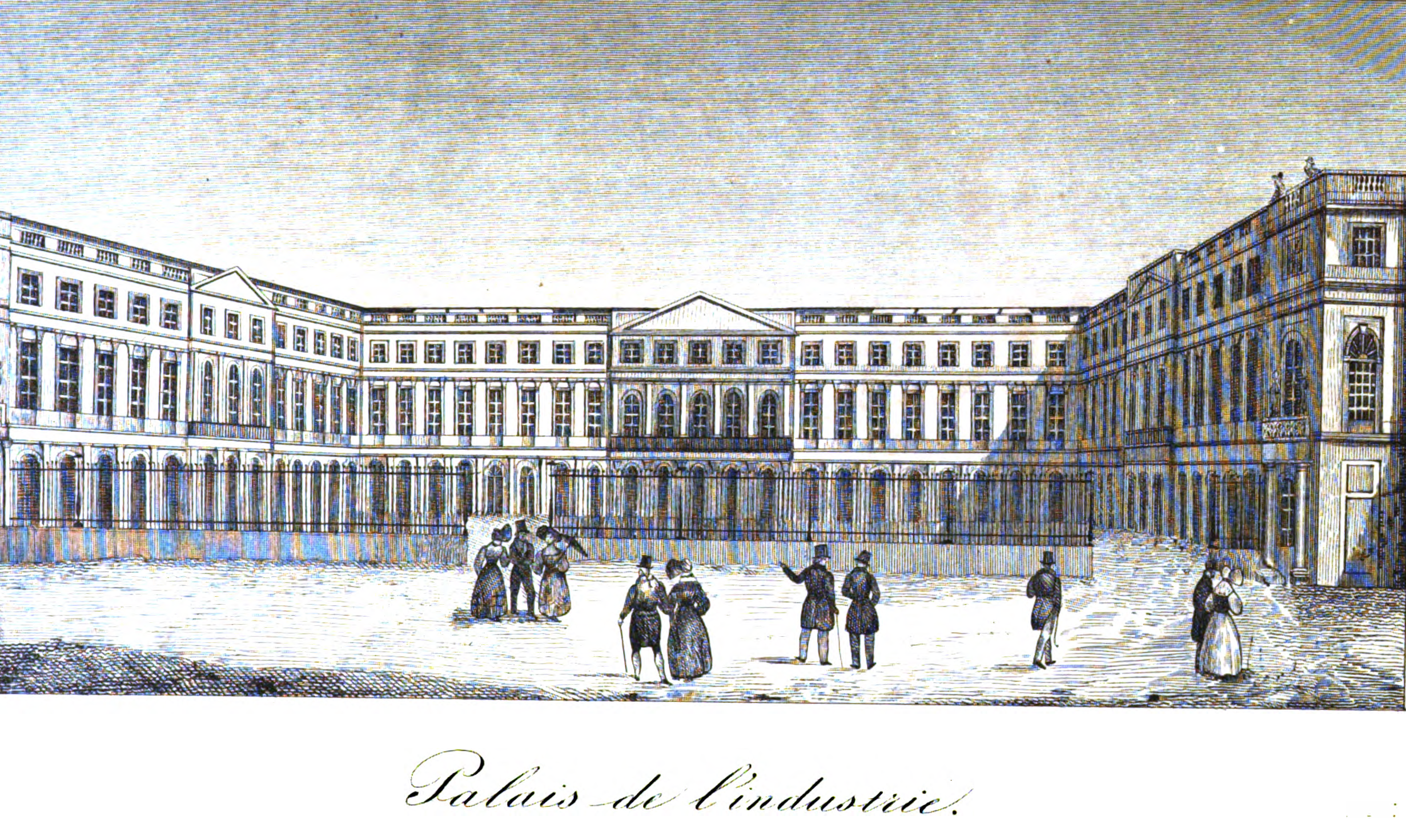
- Interactive map of the Palace of National Industry area
- Alternative names: Palace of the Products of National Industry Exhibition; Palace of Industry

General information
- Type: Exhibition space
- Architectural style: Neoclassical
- Location: 1000 City of Brussels, Brussels-Capital Region, Belgium
- Coordinates: 50.8423°N 4.3567°E
- Year built: 1825–1829
- Inaugurated: 1830

Design and construction
- Architect: Nicolas Roget

The Palace of National Industry (French: Palais de l'Industrie nationale; Dutch: Paleis van de Nationale Industrie), also known as the Palace of the Products of National Industry Exhibition (Note: French: Palais de l'exposition des produits de l'industrie nationale; Dutch: Paleis van de Producten van de Nationale Industrie Tentoonstelling) or simply the Palace of Industry, (Note: French: Palais de l'Industrie; Dutch: Paleis van de Industrie) was an exhibition hall located in Brussels, Belgium, which was established for industrial exhibitions in the 1820s.

== History ==
Situated in Brussels' Royal Quarter in the Rue du Musée/Museumstraat, the Palace of National Industry was adjacent to the Royal Museums of Fine Arts of Belgium. Before the Palace of Industry, the site was a former botanical garden that was originally the old garden of the Nassau Palace. By the mid-1750s, a neoclassical wing for Prince Charles Alexander of Lorraine, Governor-General of the Austrian Netherlands (now Belgium), was built at the site of the Nassau Palace during its conversion into the Palace of Charles of Lorraine. In the mid-1820s, another wing, created by architect Nicolas Roget, was attached to accommodate industrial exhibitions sponsored by King William I of the Netherlands. It was an extensive building featuring two wings extending outward to create a courtyard facing the street, separated from the roadway by a railing. On the east, opposite of the Palace of Industry was the site of the former Coudenberg Palace and Church of St. James on Coudenberg. The Place Royale/Koningsplein led to the Palace of Industry, dedicated in 1829, for industry and arts.

The Palace of Industry exhibited a collection of all improved tools and machines in agriculture, commerce, and science, where visitors could view the newest patents along with many intriguing models. The Palace of Industry was designed to complement the Royal Museums by providing a venue for exhibitions that highlighted technological progress and artistic achievements. The Palace of Industry was inaugurated in 1830 for the country's national industrial exhibition, Exhibition of Products of Belgian Industry but the activities were interrupted by the Belgian Revolution.

The Royal Academy of Fine Arts was transferred to the basement of the Palace of Industry in 1835, facing numerous closures due to the impacts of various wars. In addition to the school, the Royal Library of Belgium was eventually housed in one of the wings of the Palace of Industry in 1837, opened to the public on 21 May 1839.

By 1845, several rooms were utilized by the Conservatory of Arts and Trades. During this period, the complex also housed the public library, the Gallery of Paintings, the Gallery of Natural History, and the Cabinet of Natural Philosophy.

== See also ==
- History of Brussels
- Belgium in the long nineteenth century
