= Auguste-Donat De Hemptinne =

Belgian pharmacist (1781-1854)

Auguste De Hemptinne
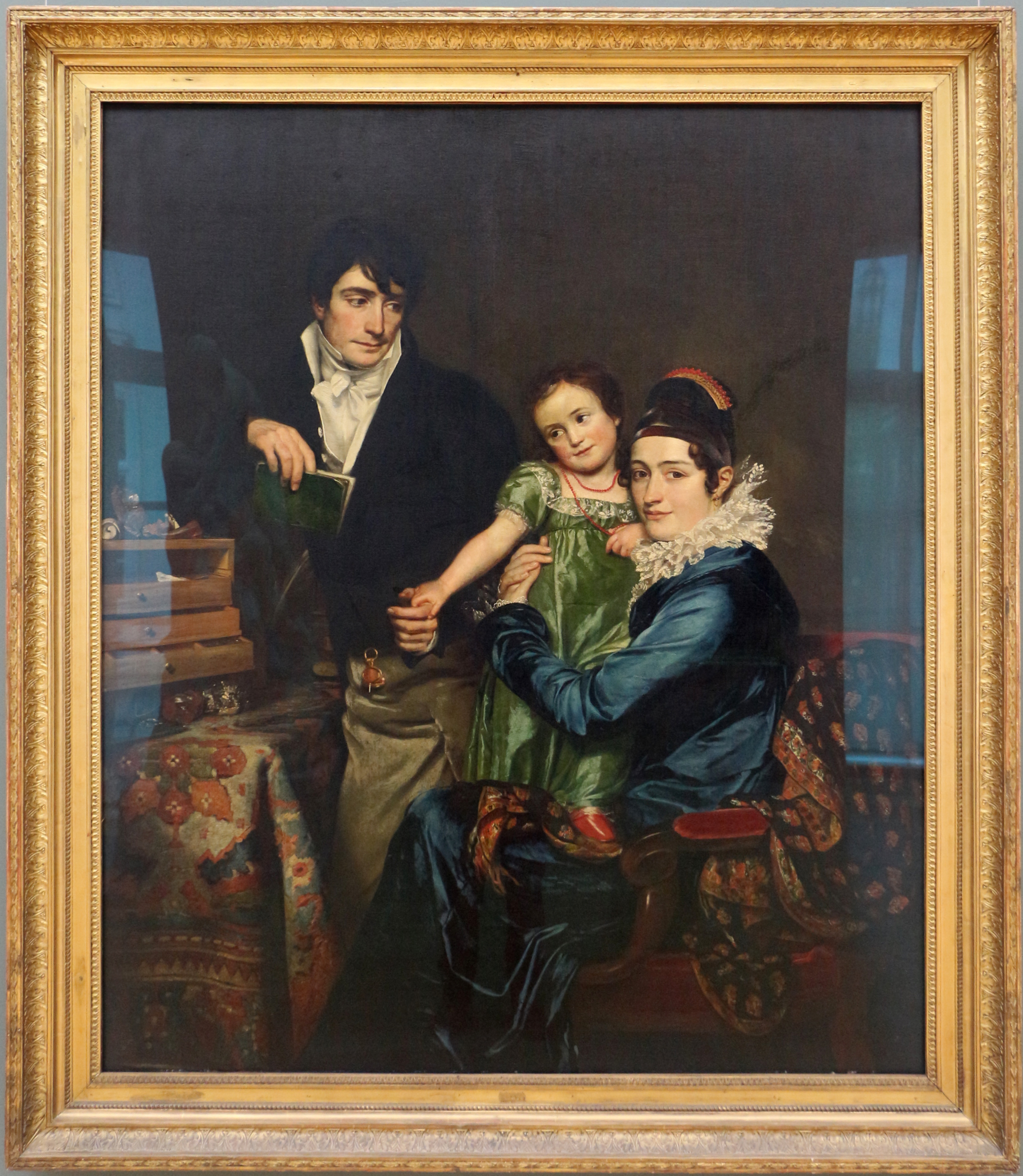
- Born: Auguste-Donat De Hemptinne; August 15, 1781; Orp-Jauche, Duchy of Brabant, Austrian Netherlands, Habsburg monarchy
- Died: 5 January 1854 (aged 72); City of Brussels, Kingdom of Belgium
- Occupations: Pharmacist; Industrialist
- Relatives: Auguste-Ferdinand de Hemptinne (son)
- Awards: Order of Leopold

Auguste De Hemptinne (August 15, 1781 – January 5, 1854) was a Belgian pharmacist and industrialist.

== Biography ==
=== Early life and education ===
Auguste-Donat De Hemptinne was born in Orp-Jauche, Brabant, Austrian Netherlands (now Belgium) on August 15, 1781. Son of Jean Lambert De Hemptinne and Jeanne Françoise Drouin, his father acted as a notary and chief mayor of the barony of Jauche and seven neighboring communes during the time of Joseph II, the French Revolution, and the First French Empire.

=== Career ===
As of 1806, De Hemptinne held the position of pharmacist. After his practical training as a pharmacist in Paris under Louis Nicolas Vauquelin, he opened his pharmacy in Brussels.

Starting in 1809 and continuing until 1852, he was often the subject of portraits by his brother-in-law and Belgian painter François-Joseph Navez.

De Hemptinne took an active part in the development of the branches of industry in Belgium. He helped introduce the production of neatsfoot oil in 1814.

De Hemptinne split his time between pharmacy care and studying chemistry, technology, and public hygiene. In 1816, the Academy of Marie Thérèse, reestablished by the King of the Netherlands, announced a competition for Belgian factories on the uses of water vapor as a heating method. His work, crowned and published in 1818, was the first memoir from the State University of Leuven's science section established by Jean-Baptiste Van Mons in 1819.

He founded a chemical products factory in Molenbeek-Saint-Jean in 1822. King William I rewarded his contributions to the chemical industry by giving him the royal appointment of court pharmacist in 1827.

De Hemptinne, Poelman-Hamelinck, and Frédéric Basse introduced the guilloché lathe for printing rollers in 1826. De Hemptinne and Frédéric Basse also imported a wheel engraving system from England in 1827, comprising machinery for raising, dividing, and applying the wheel to the roller. That same year, De Hemptinne patented a machine for simultaneously beating and rinsing cotton canvas, but its need for frequent repairs led to its abandonment. He was appointed to the steering committee of the 1830 Exposition des produits de l'industrie belge in the wake of the Belgian Revolution. He sent both factory products and his inventions for display. He also served on the steering committees for the 1835, 1841, and 1847 Exhibitions in Brussels. He often experimented with applying colors to cotton canvases. De Hemptinne, Poelman-Hamelinck, Eugène Prévinaire, and Seny introduced the perrotine printing machine to Belgium in 1834, allowing three colors to be applied at once, replacing the wooden board. De Hemptinne was admitted to the Royal Academy of Science, Letters and Fine Arts of Belgium on May 7, 1834. After exhibiting his products at the 1835 Belgian Industrial Exhibition, he was awarded the Cross of the Order of Leopold, becoming a knight in October 1836. In 1841, he participated in the organizing committee of the Exposition des produits de l'industrie belge.

He was one of the first members of the Royal Academy of Medicine of Belgium established by King Leopold I of Belgium in 1841. At that time, he was the sole representative of the country's pharmaceutical section within the Royal Academy. He organized and became director of the school of pharmacy at the Free University of Brussels in 1842. Auguste de Hemptinne presented his invention, a device for inhaling ether, to the Royal Academy of Medicine of Belgium in February 1847.

De Hemptinne was the lead author of the first pharmacopoeia of the independent Belgian kingdom, Pharmacopoea Belgica Nova (1854).

De Hemptinne became treasurer of Belgium's Royal Academy of Science, Letters and Fine Arts in 1850 and president in 1851.

== Death ==
Auguste-Donat De Hemptinne died in the City of Brussels, Belgium on January 5, 1854. He was later buried in Laeken.

== Family ==
De Hemptinne married Marie Antoinette de Lathuy on July 2, 1812. This marriage produced three children—two sons and a daughter. Auguste-Ferdinand de Hemptinne, the eldest child born in 1819, eventually took over the chemical products factory in Molenbeek. He was the brother-in-law of Belgian painter François-Joseph Navez.
