= Place Rouppe =

Square in Brussels, Belgium

Place Rouppe (French); Rouppeplein (Dutch)
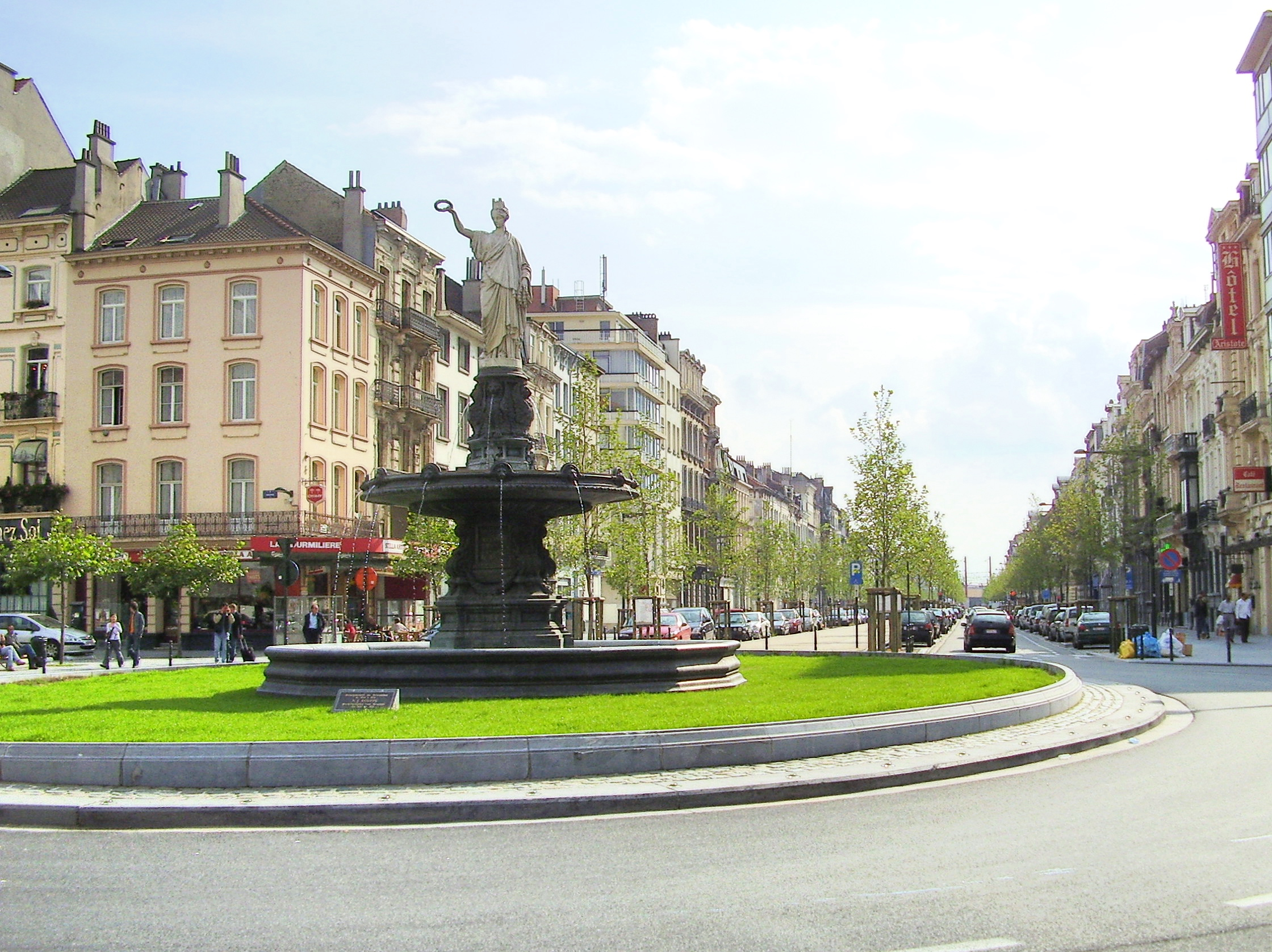
- The Place Rouppe/Rouppeplein and Avenue de Stalingrad/Stalingradlaan in Brussels

- Location within Brussels Location within Belgium
- Type: Square
- Location: City of Brussels, Brussels-Capital Region, Belgium
- Quarter: Midi–Lemonnier or Stalingrad Quarter
- Postal code: 1000
- Coordinates: 50°50′34″N 04°20′45″E

Construction
- Inauguration: 1841

Other
- Designer: Victor Jamaer

The Place Rouppe (French, pronounced [plas ʁup]) or Rouppeplein (Dutch, pronounced [ˈrupəˌplɛin]) is a square in central Brussels, Belgium. It is named in honour of Nicolas-Jean Rouppe, the first mayor of the City of Brussels following the Belgian Revolution of 1830. Rectangular and symmetrical in shape, it is located in the Midi–Lemonnier or Stalingrad Quarter (southern part of the City of Brussels), between the Rue du Midi/Zuidstraat and the Avenue de Stalingrad/Stalingradlaan.

== History ==
The Place Rouppe was inaugurated on 26 September 1841 as a forecourt for Bogards' railway station, Brussels' first South Station, so-called for the former cloister of the Bogards' convent whose site it was built on, and to which the Rue des Bogards/Bogaardenstraat is nowadays the only reference. The former presence of a station at this location also explains the unusual width of the current Avenue de Stalingrad/Stalingradlaan, which goes from the square to the Small Ring (Brussels' inner ring road), a reminder of the train tracks that used to run in its middle.

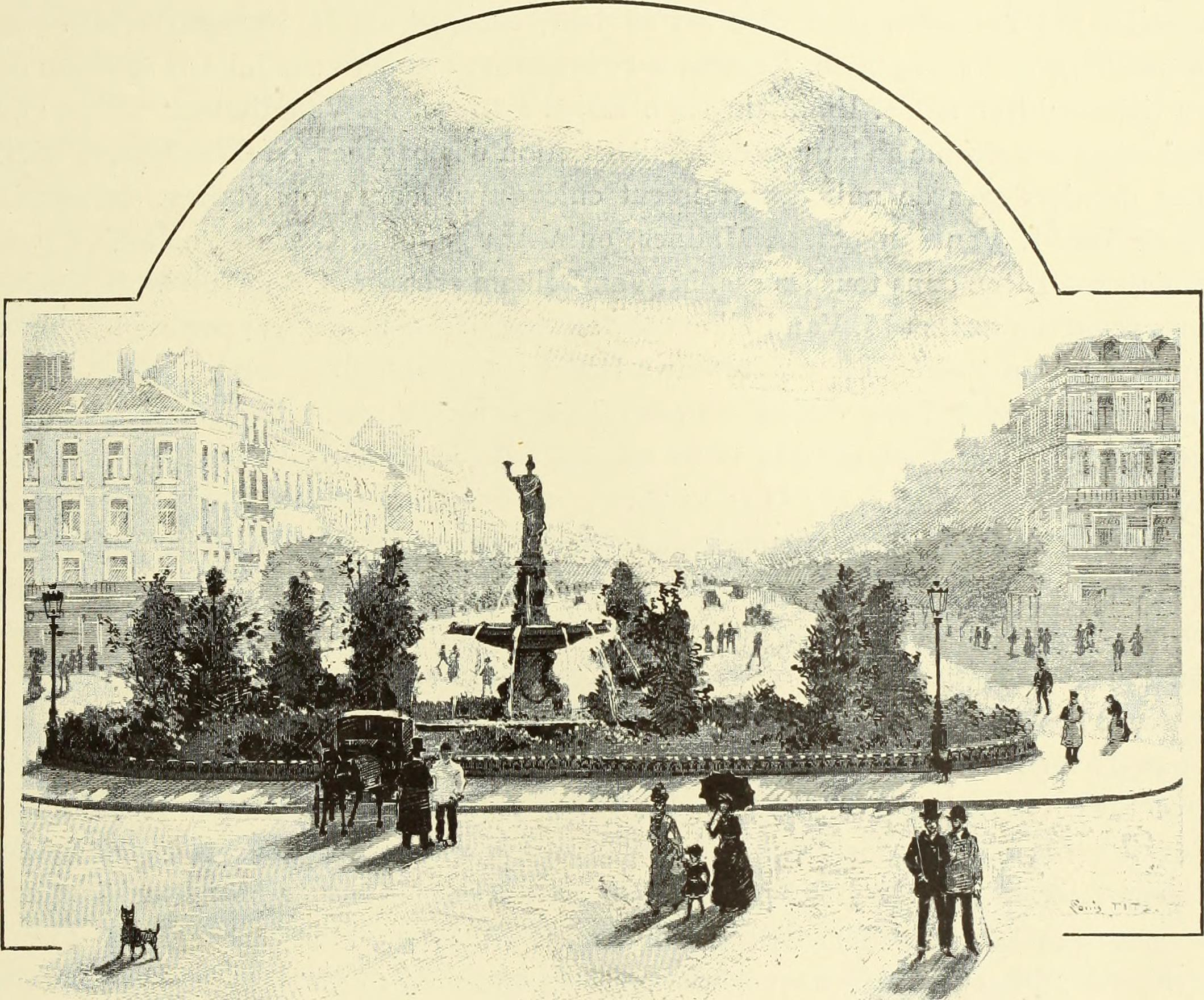
The Place Rouppe/Rouppeplein in 1884 from Bruxelles à travers les âges

In 1848, the Rouppe Fountain was inaugurated in the middle of the square. It was designed by the architect Joseph Poelaert and the sculptor Charles-Auguste Fraikin. In 1869, a new South Station was built on the site of the current Brussels-South Station, because Bogards' station had already become too small. The current layout, a central square surrounded by a cast iron gate and rows of trees, dates from 1884 and was designed by the city's architect Victor Jamaer.

== Rouppe Fountain ==
Since 1844, the centre of square has been occupied by a monumental fountain known as the Rouppe Fountain. This monument, the work of Joseph Poelaert, and originally bearing a medallion bust of Rouppe, was inaugurated in 1848. It was inspired by the fountains of the Champs-Élysées in Paris.

The fountain is made up of two basins; the water from the upper bronze basin flows into the lower blue stone basin through twelve lion mouths. At the request of the City of Brussels, the sculptor Fraikin, a former student of the Royal Academy of Fine Arts in Brussels, replaced the original medallion with an allegorical white marble statue representing the City of Brussels. She holds a laurel wreath in one hand and wears a reproduction of the Cathedral of St. Michael and St. Gudula on her head.

== See also ==
- Neoclassical architecture in Belgium
- History of Brussels
- Belgium in the long nineteenth century
