= Guillaume Van Volxem =

Belgian liberal politician and mayor of Brussels (1791–1868)

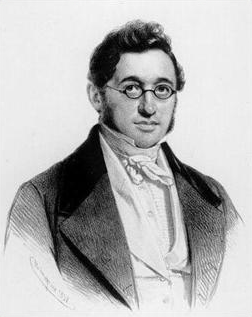
- Van Volxem in 1838

Minister of Justice
- In office 13 April 1841 – 14 December 1842
- Prime Minister: Jean-Baptiste Nothomb
- Preceded by: Mathieu Leclercq
- Succeeded by: Jean-Baptiste Nothomb

Mayor of Brussels
- In office 13 September 1838 – 13 April 1841
- Preceded by: Nicolas-Jean Rouppe
- Succeeded by: François-Jean Wyns de Raucour

Personal details
- Born: Guillaume-Hippolyte Van Volxem; 13 February 1791 Brussels, Austrian Netherlands
- Died: 17 April 1868 (aged 77) Brussels, Belgium
- Occupation: Politician, lawyer

Guillaume-Hippolyte Van Volxem (13 February 1791 – 17 April 1868) was a Belgian lawyer, liberal politician and mayor of the City of Brussels.

== Life and career ==
Coat of arms of the Van Volxem family

Van Volxem was born and died in Brussels. As a graduate of the École de droit de Bruxelles, he became a lawyer at the Bar Association of Brussels. He began his political career in 1830, when he was designated as temporary member of the National Congress. In the same year, he was elected as alderman in Brussels and he was re-elected in 1836. Later, he became a member of the provincial council of Brabant and a member of the Belgian Chamber of Representatives (1837–1845).

After the death of Nicolas-Jean Rouppe in 1838, he became the second burgomaster of the Belgian capital after the country's independence in 1830, as the municipal council designated him on 13 September 1838 to fulfill the functions of burgomaster of Brussels (1838–1841). He resigned as burgomaster when, on 13 April 1841, he became Minister for Justice (1841–1842) in the cabinet of Jean-Baptiste Nothomb, who succeeded on that day the liberal Joseph Lebeau, who had resigned. But van Volxem only stayed minister for twenty months, because Nothomb on 14 December 1842, took on its own account the position of Minister for Justice, in addition to that of Prime Minister. On 16 April 1843, the Catholic Jules d'Anethan became Minister for Justice after the Belgian elections in the spring of that year.

In 1845, at 54 years of age, Guillaume van Volxem withdrew from political life. Married to Adélaïde Willems, then to Félicité Marischal (daughter of the very wealthy lawyer Jacques-Herman Marischal, administrator of the department of the Dyle, and aunt of Félix Paul Tiberghien and Arthur Warocqué), he was the father of Jules Van Volxem.

== See also ==
- List of mayors of the City of Brussels

== Sources ==
- Du Bois, A., Les Bourgmestres de Bruxelles, in : Revue de Belgique, April 1896, p. 365-396.
- De Paepe, Jean-Luc, Raindorf-Gérard, Christiane (red), Le Parlement Belge 1831–1894. Données Biographiques, Brussel, Académie Royale de Belgique, 1996, p. 593-594.
