= Free University of Brussels (1834–1969) =

Bilingual university, now split into two

- Université libre de Bruxelles (French); Vrije Universiteit Brussel (Dutch)
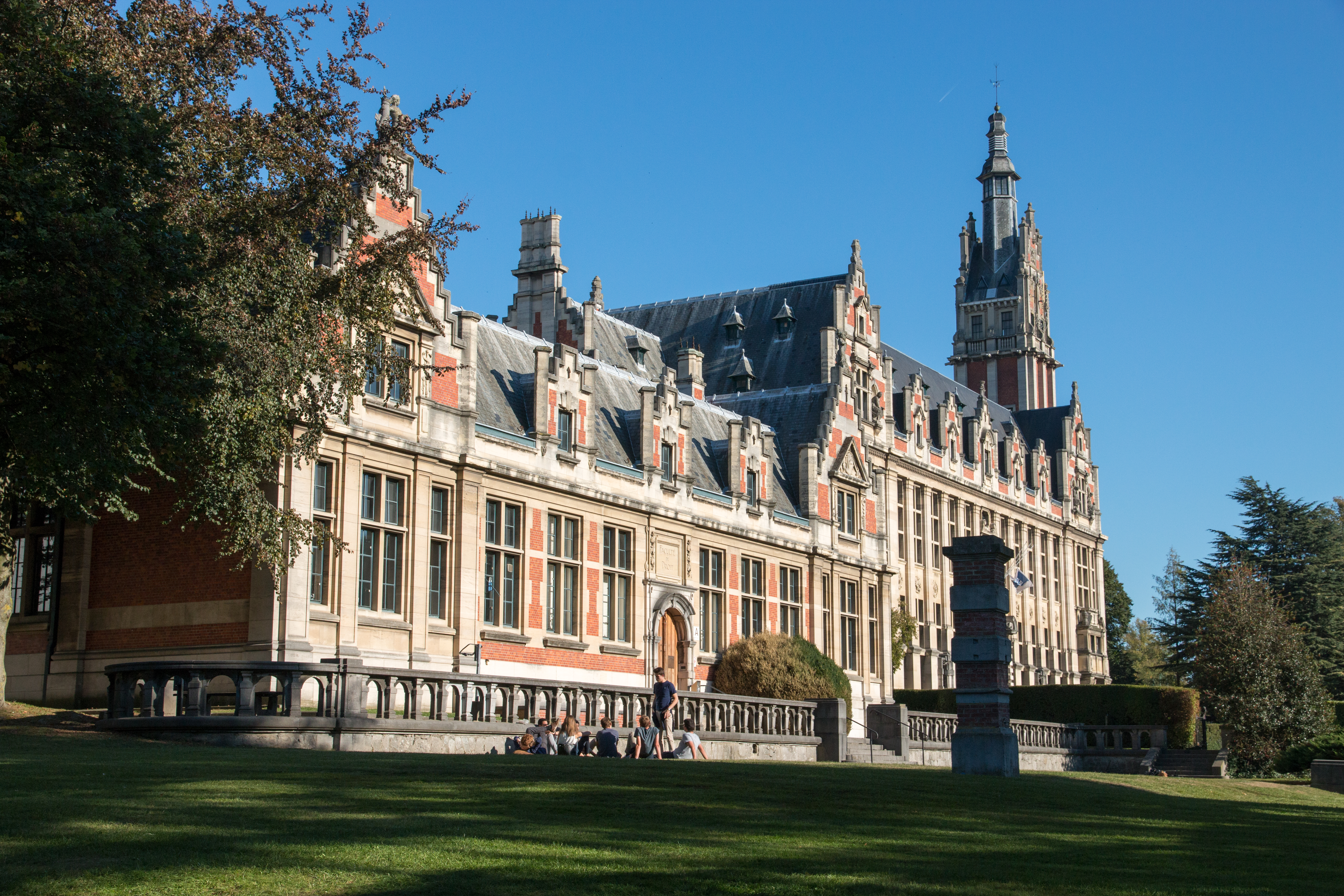
- The main building of the Solbosch/Solbos campus, built in the 1920s. It now houses the Université libre de Bruxelles (ULB).
- Motto: Scientia vincere tenebras (Latin)
- Motto in English: Conquering darkness through science
- Type: Private university
- Active: 20 November 1834–1 October 1969
- Founder: Pierre-Théodore Verhaegen
- Location: Brussels, Brabant, Belgium
- Language: French; Also: Dutch (from 1935)
- Successors: Université libre de Bruxelles; Vrije Universiteit Brussel

The Free University of Brussels (French: Université libre de Bruxelles or ULB; Dutch: Vrije Hogeschool te Brussel, later Vrije Universiteit Brussel), also known simply as the University of Brussels, was a private university in Brussels, Belgium. It existed between 1834 and 1969 when it split along linguistic lines.

Founded in 1834 on the principle of "free inquiry" (French: libre examen), its founders envisaged the institution as a freethinker reaction to the traditional dominance of Catholicism in the country's education system. It was avowedly secular and particularly associated with political liberalism during the era of pillarisation. The Free University was one of Belgium's major universities, together with the Catholic University of Leuven and the state universities of Liège and Ghent.

The "Linguistic Wars" affected the Free University, which split along language lines in 1969 in the aftermath of student unrest at Leuven the previous year. Today, two institutions carry the "Free University of Brussels" name: the French-speaking Université libre de Bruxelles (ULB) and the Dutch-speaking Vrije Universiteit Brussel (VUB). Although separate, both institutions continue to collaborate under the auspices of an umbrella organisation known as Brussels University Alliance since 2013.

== History ==
=== Establishment of a university in Brussels ===
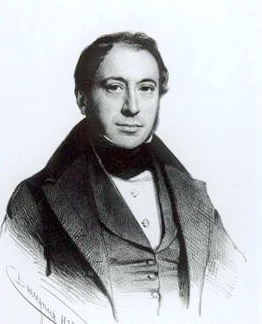
Pierre-Théodore Verhaegen, founder of the Free University of Brussels

The Free University of Brussels was founded as the Free University of Belgium (Université libre de Belgique) on 20 November 1834 in the aftermath of Belgium's independence in 1830. Belgium had possessed three state universities at Leuven, Ghent, and Liège under Dutch rule. Still, teaching had been extensively disrupted by the revolution and continued hostilities with the Dutch. As early as 1831, Belgian freemasons of the Les Amis philanthropes lodge had considered founding a new private university.

News of the imminent creation of the Catholic University of Mechelen revived the initiative among those with anti-clerical ideas, especially freemasons, liberals, and other freethinkers. Pierre-Théodore Verhaegen and Auguste Baron led the fundraising for the new institution from April 1834. It was officially founded on 20 November 1834 in the former Palace of Charles of Lorraine in Brussels with the help of the liberal mayor Nicolas-Jean Rouppe. The date of its establishment is still commemorated annually, by students of its successor institutions, as a holiday called Saint Verhaegen (often shortened to St V) for Pierre-Théodore Verhaegen.

The motivating principle behind the new institution was "free inquiry" (French: libre examen) which denoted freethinking ideas inherited from the European Enlightenment. This hostility to political and religious authority led to hostility from the Catholic Church and Catholic Party politicians, increasingly associated with the Mechelen university's successor, the Catholic University of Leuven founded in 1835. Under the system of pillarisation, the Free University became one of the principle institutions in the Liberal "pillar". It was renamed the Université libre de Bruxelles ("Free University of Brussels") in 1842.

After its establishment, the Free University faced difficult times, since it received no subsidies or grants from the government; yearly fundraising events and tuition fees provided the only financial means. Verhaegen, who became a professor and later head of the new university, gave it a mission statement which he summarised in a speech to King Leopold I: "the principle of free inquiry and academic freedom uninfluenced by any political or religious authority." In 1858, the Catholic Church established the Saint-Louis Institute in the city, which subsequently expanded into a university in its own right.

=== Growth and internal tensions ===
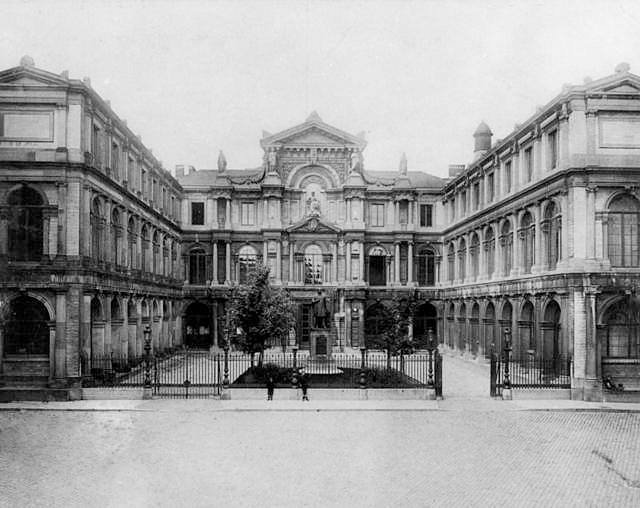
The Free University, then housed in the Granvelle Palace, c. 1900

The Free University grew significantly over the following decades. In 1842, it moved to the Granvelle Palace, which it occupied until 1928. It expanded the number of subjects taught and, in 1880, became one of the first institutions in Belgium to allow female students to study in some faculties. In 1893, it received large grants from Ernest and Alfred Solvay as well as Raoul Warocqué to open new faculties in Brussels. A disagreement over an invitation to the anarchist geographer Élisée Reclus to speak at the university in 1893 from the rector Hector Denis led to some of the liberal and socialist faculty splitting away from the Free University to form the New University of Brussels (Université nouvelle de Bruxelles) in 1894. However, the radical institution failed to displace the Free University and closed definitively in 1919.

In 1900, the Free University's football team won the bronze medal at the Summer Olympics. After Racing Club de Bruxelles declined to participate, a student selection with players from the university was sent by the Federation. The team was reenforced with a few non-students.

The Solvay Institute of Sociology was founded in 1902. It was joined, in 1904, by an early business school in the form of the Solvay School of Commerce which would later become the Solvay Brussels School of Economics and Management (part of ULB) and VUB Solvay Business School (part of VUB). In 1911, the university obtained its legal personality under the name Université libre de Bruxelles - Vrije Hogeschool te Brussel.

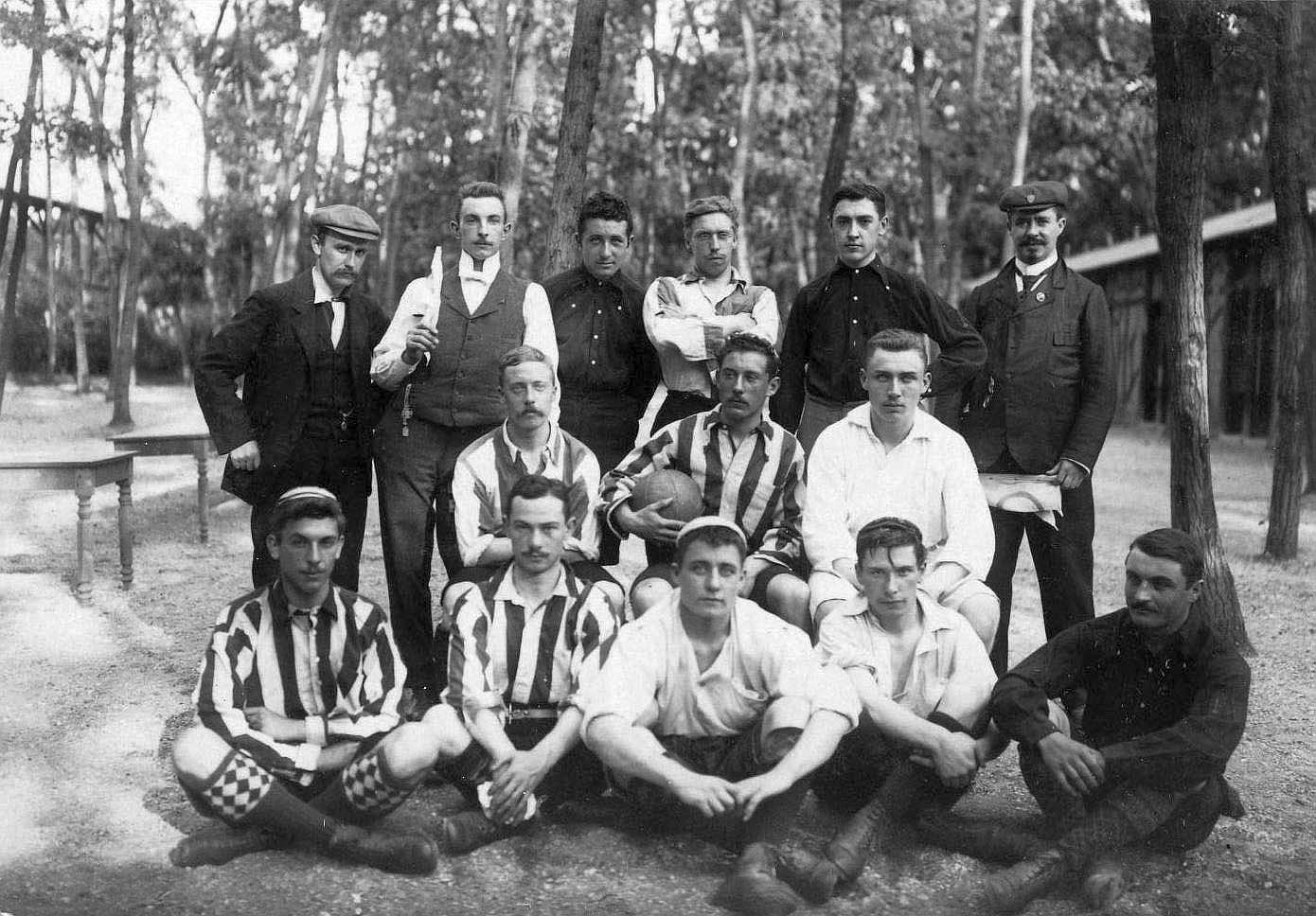
The university's football team that won the bronze medal at the 1900 Olympic Games

=== German occupation and move ===
The German occupation during World War I led to the suspension of classes for four years in 1914–1918. In the aftermath of the war, the Free University moved its principal activities to the Solbosch/Solbos in the southern municipality of Ixelles, and a purpose-built university campus was created, funded by the Belgian American Educational Foundation.

During the second occupation of World War II, the university protested the two anti-Jewish ordinances of 28 October 1940, but nevertheless collaborated for the expulsion of Jewish professors and students. However, the university ceased its collaboration when it came to accepting Flemish professors of the New Order. Thus, the university was again closed by the German authorities on 25 November 1941, and some of its students were involved in the Belgian Resistance, establishing the sabotage-orientated network Groupe G.

=== Splitting of the university ===
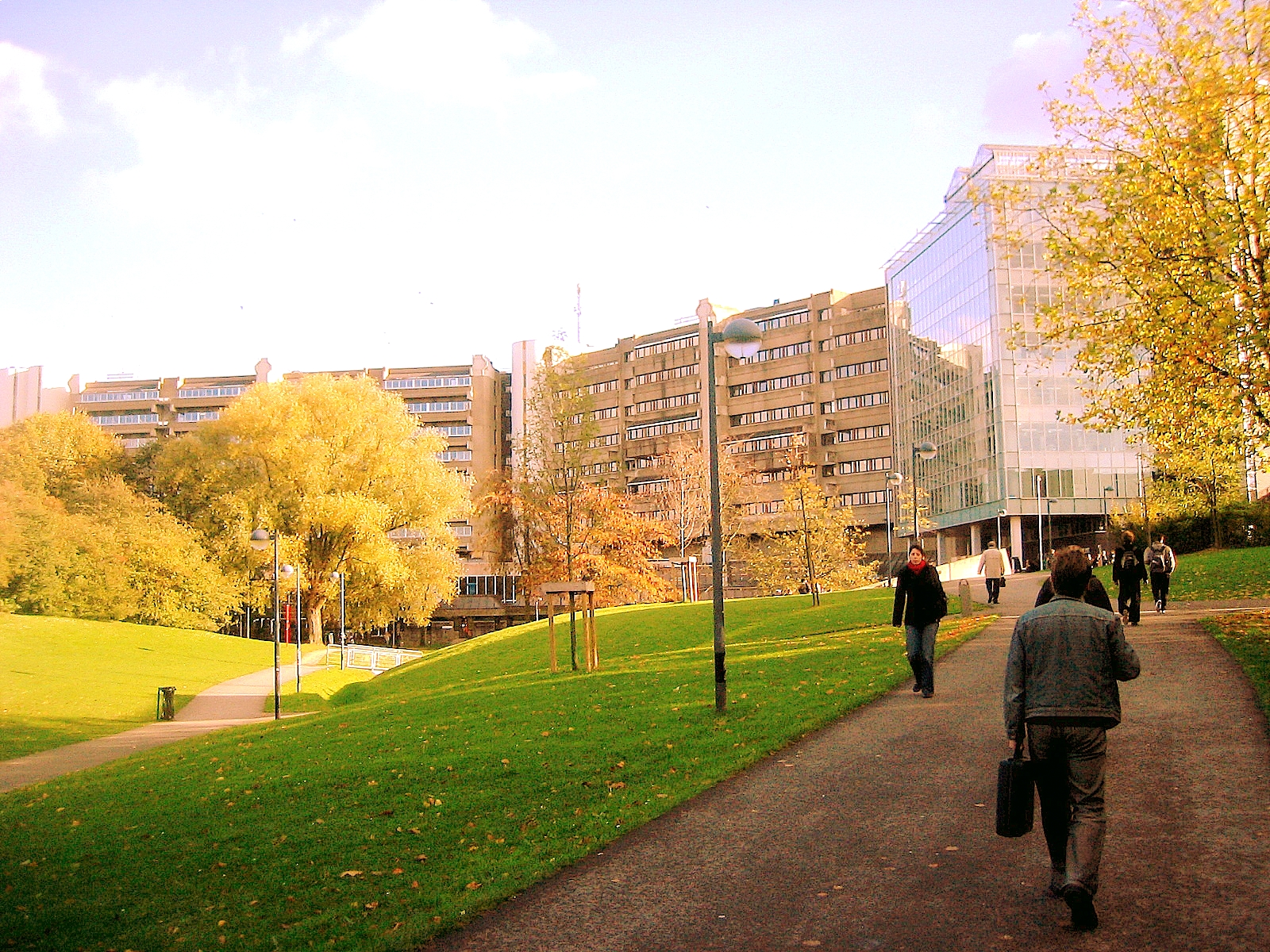
The Dutch-language Vrije Universiteit Brussel (VUB) moved to a new campus as a result of the split.

Courses at the Free University were taught exclusively in French until the early 20th century. After Belgian independence, French was widely accepted as the language of the bourgeoisie and upper classes and was the only medium in law and academia. As the Flemish Movement gained prominence among the Dutch-speaking majority in Flanders over the late 19th century, the lack of provision for Dutch speakers in higher education became a major source of political contention. Ghent University became the first institution in 1930 to teach exclusively in Dutch.

Some Free University's Faculty of Law courses began being taught in French and Dutch as early as 1935. Nevertheless, it was not until 1963 that all faculties offered their courses in both languages. Tensions between French- and Dutch-speaking students in the country came to a head in 1968 when the Catholic University of Leuven split along linguistic lines, becoming the first of several national institutions to do so.

On 1 October 1969, the French and Dutch entities of the Free University separated into two distinct sister universities. This splitting was officialised in the act of 28 May 1970, of the Belgian Parliament, by which the French-speaking Université libre de Bruxelles (ULB) and the Dutch-speaking Vrije Universiteit Brussel (VUB) officially became two separate legal, administrative and scientific entities.

== Notable people ==
=== Notable faculty ===
- Henri La Fontaine (1854–1943): Nobel Peace Prize in 1913
- Jules Bordet (1870–1961): Nobel Prize in Physiology or Medicine in 1919

=== Notable alumni ===
- Amir-Abbas Hoveyda (1919–1979), Prime Minister of Iran
- René Sheridan (1873–1928), lawyer who served as a judge in the Congo and Siam

== Honours ==
=== International ===
- Olympic Games
  - Bronze medalists (1): 1900

== See also ==
- List of modern universities in Europe (1801–1945)
- Category:Free University of Brussels (1834–1969) alumni
- First School War
- List of split up universities
