= Nicolas-Jean Rouppe =

Belgian liberal politician and mayor of Brussels (1768–1838)

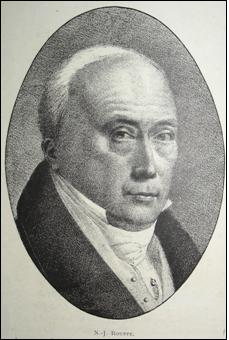

Mayor of Brussels
- In office 22 October 1830 – 3 August 1838
- Preceded by: Louis de Wellens
- Succeeded by: Guillaume Van Volxem

Personal details
- Born: 17 April 1768 Rotterdam, Dutch Republic
- Died: 3 August 1838 (aged 70) Brussels, Belgium

Nicolas-Jean Rouppe (French pronunciation: [nikɔla ʒɑ̃ ʁup]; Dutch: Nikolaus Joannes Rouppe; baptised 17 April 1768 – 3 August 1838) was a Belgian liberal politician. He was the first mayor of the City of Brussels after Belgian independence in 1830.

== Life and career ==
Nicolas-Jean Rouppe was born in Rotterdam, and became a sub-deacon of the order of the Carmelites, but he broke radically with his faith in 1792, the day after Battle of Jemappes between the French Revolutionary and Austrian armies on 6 November 1792. That year, he also provoked a riot by destroying the cross in Leuven's Town Hall. Under the French regime, he became commissioner of the department of the Dyle. On 21 July 1803, he received Napoleon at the Palace of Laeken.

After the Belgian Revolution in 1830, he was a member of the National Congress. Later, he became a member of the Belgian Chamber of Representatives. From 1830 up to 1838, he was burgomaster of Brussels. As burgomaster, he also received the new king Leopold I of Belgium at the Palace of Laeken on 21 July 1831, the day Leopold swore allegiance to the Constitution of Belgium. Together with Pierre-Théodore Verhaegen, Nicolas-Jean Rouppe is also one of the initiators of the Free University of Brussels.

Rouppe died in Brussels, and is buried in Laeken Cemetery. A square in central Brussels, the Place Rouppe/Rouppeplein, is named after him.

== See also ==
- List of mayors of the City of Brussels

== Sources ==
- Du Bois, A., Les bourgmestres de Bruxelles, in : Revue de Belgique, April 1896, p. 365-396.
- Spreutels, J.-P., Une bonne action de Nicolas Rouppe sous l'occupation française, in : Cahiers Bruxellois, XIX, 1974, p. 84-85.
