= Louis Prosper Gachard =

Belgian archivist (1800–1885)

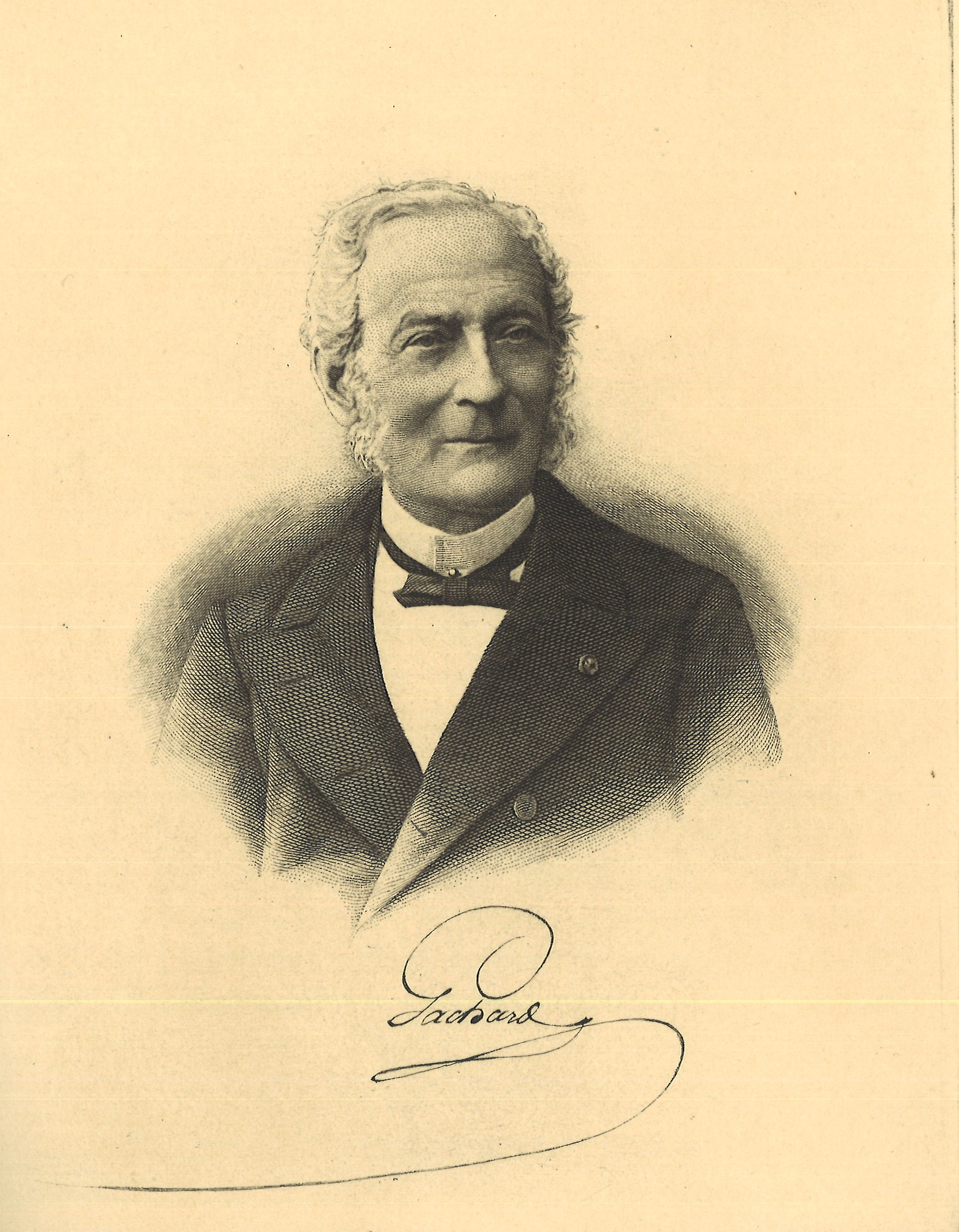
- Born: 12 March 1800; Paris, France
- Died: 24 December 1885 (aged 85); Brussels, Belgium
- Occupations: archivist and writer

Louis Prosper Gachard (12 March 1800 – 24 December 1885), Belgian man of letters, was born in Paris.

He entered the administration of the national archives in 1826, and was appointed director-general in 1831, a post which he held for fifty-five years. During this long period he reorganized the service, added to the records by copies taken in other European collections, travelled for purposes of study, and carried on a wide correspondence with other keepers of records, and with historical scholars.

He also edited and published many valuable collections of state papers; a full list of his various publications was printed in the Annuaire de l'Académie royale de Belgique by Ch. Piot in 1888, pp. 220–236. It includes 246 entries.

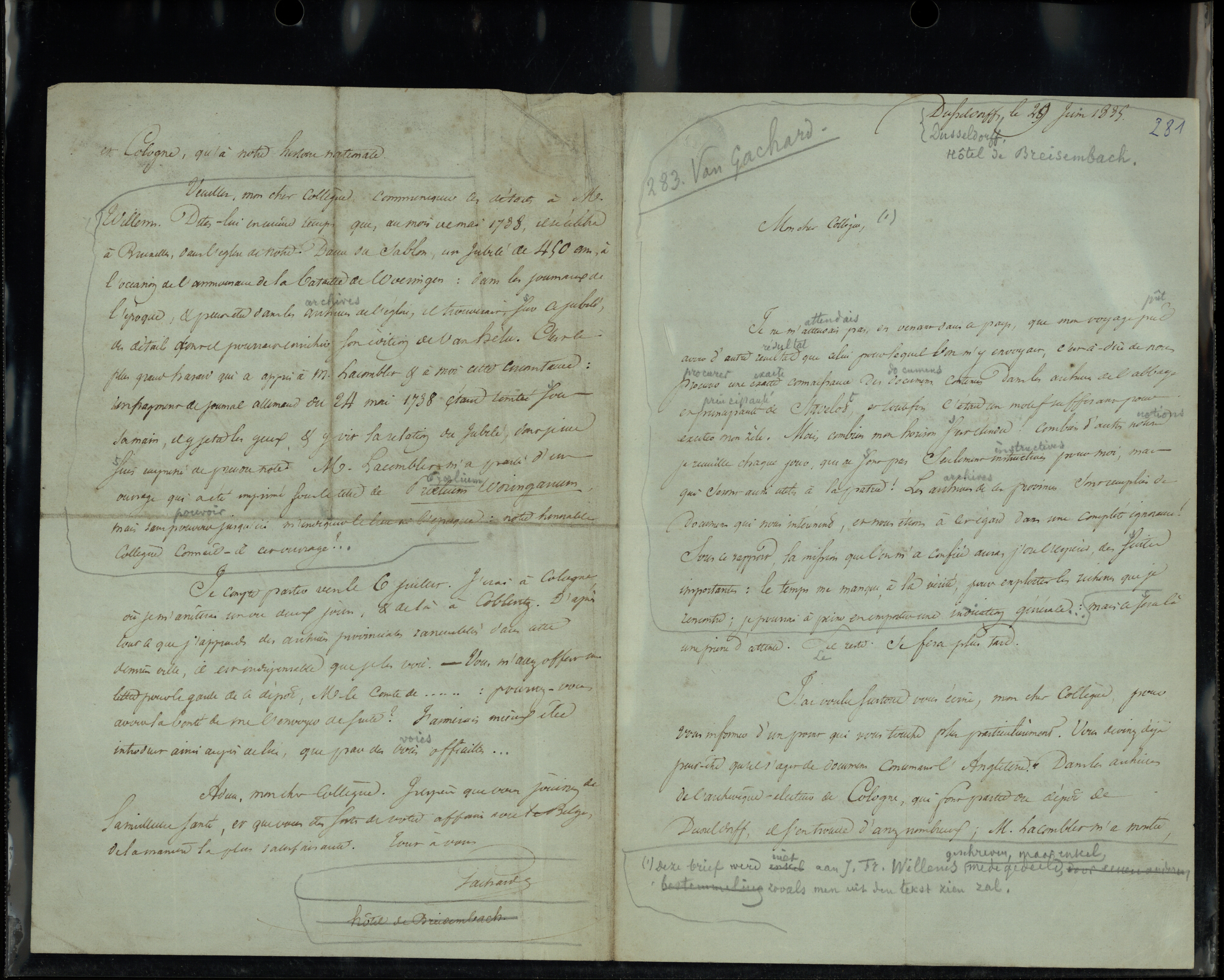
Letter by Gachard to Warnkönig (1835)

He was the author of several historical writings, of which the best known are Don Carlos et Philippe II (1863), Études et notices historiques concernant l'histoire des Pays-Bas (1863), Histoire de la Belgique au commencement du XVIIIème siècle (1880), Histoire politique et diplomatique de P. P. Rubens (1877), all published at Brussels.

His chief editorial works are the Actes des États généraux des Pays-Bas 1576–1585 (Brussels, 1861–1866), Collection de documens inédits concernant l'histoire de la Belgique (Brussels, 1833 1835), and the Relations des ambassadeurs vénitiens sur Charles V et Philippe II (Brussels, 1855). Gachard died in Brussels on 24 December 1885.
