= François-Jean Wyns de Raucour =

Belgian liberal politician and mayor of Brussels (1779–1857)

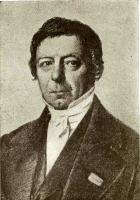

Mayor of Brussels
- In office 14 April 1841 – 4 October 1848
- Preceded by: Guillaume Van Volxem
- Succeeded by: Charles de Brouckère

Personal details
- Born: 6 November 1779 Brussels, Austrian Netherlands
- Died: 4 January 1857 (aged 77) Brussels, Belgium
- Occupation: Politician

François-Jean Wyns de Raucour (or Raucourt), knight (6 November 1779 – 4 January 1857), was a Belgian liberal politician and mayor of the City of Brussels.

He was a lawyer and became alderman and mayor of Brussels (1840–1848). He was also a member of the provincial council of Brabant and a member of the Belgian Senate.

== Honours ==
- Knight in the Order of Leopold.
- Knight of the Legion of Honour.

== See also ==
- List of mayors of the City of Brussels

== Sources ==
- Du Bois, A., "Les Bourgmestres de Bruxelles", in : Revue de Belgique, April 1896, pp. 365–396.
- De Paepe, Jean-Luc, Raindorf-Gérard, Christiane (red), Le Parlement Belge 1831-1894. Données Biographiques, Brussels, Académie Royale de Belgique, 1996, pp. 626–627.
- Pergameni, Ch., in : Biographie Nationale, Brussels, Académie Royale des Sciences, des Lettres et des Beaux Arts, 1866–1986, XXVII, 1936–1938, col. 422–424.
