= List of people from Brussels =

This is a list of notable people from Brussels, Belgium.

== Patroness of Brussels ==
- Saint Gudula, patron saint of the city and national saint of Belgium

== Political leaders in Brussels ==
=== Belgian monarchs ===
The Belgian monarchs reside in Brussels, the capital of Belgium. They were all born in Brussels (except for Leopold I).

- Leopold I (1790–1865), the first King of the Belgians
- Leopold II (1835–1909), the second King of the Belgians
- Albert I (1875–1934), the third King of the Belgians
- Leopold III (1901–1983), the fourth King of the Belgians
- Baudouin (1930–1993), the fifth King of the Belgians
- Albert II (born 1934; abdicated 2013), the sixth King of the Belgians
- Philippe (born 1960), the seventh King of the Belgians

=== Minister-Presidents of Brussels ===
- Charles Picqué (PS) (1989–1999)
- Jacques Simonet (MR) (1999–2000)
- François-Xavier de Donnéa (MR) (2000–2003)
- Daniel Ducarme (MR) (2003–2004)
- Jacques Simonet (MR) (2004) (replaced Daniel Ducarme who resigned)
- Charles Picqué (PS) (2004–2013)
- Rudi Vervoort (PS) (2013–2026)
- Boris Dilliès (MR) (2026–present)

=== Governors of Brussels ===
- André Degroeve (1995–1998)
- Raymonde Dury (1998) (resigned)
- Véronique Paulus de Châtelet (1998–2009)
- Hugo Nys (2009–2010) (acting)
- Jean Clément (2010–2014) (acting)

=== Mayors of Brussels ===
- Joseph Van De Meulebroeck (lib.) (1939–1956)
- Lucien Cooremans (lib.) (1956–1975)
- Pierre Van Halteren (lib.) (1975–1983)
- Hervé Brouhon (PS) (1983–1993) (died in office)
- Michel Demaret (PSC–CVP) (1993–1994)
- Freddy Thielemans (PS) (1994–1995)
- François-Xavier de Donnéa (MR) (1995–2000)
- Freddy Thielemans (PS) (2001–2013)
- Yvan Mayeur (PS) (2013–2017)
- Philippe Close (PS) (2017–present)

== Born in Brussels ==
Following notable people were born in the area today known as the Brussels-Capital Region.

=== Royals ===
- Mary of Burgundy (1457–1482), Duchess of Burgundy from 1477–1482
- Charles VII (1697–1745), Holy Roman Emperor
- Charles Eugene (1728–1793), Duke of Württemberg
- Princess Joséphine-Charlotte of Belgium (1927–2005), Grand Duchess of Luxembourg
- Princess Luisa Maria at Clinique Saint Jean in 1995
- Princess Laetitia Maria at Clinique Saint Jean in 2003

=== Politicians ===
- Paul Deschanel (1855–1922), president of France (1920)
- Antoine Duquesne (1941–2010), Belgian MP and Senator, Member of the European Parliament
- Pierre Harmel (1911–2009), Prime Minister of Belgium (1965–1966)
- Marie Janson (1873–1960), politician
- Paul-Emile Janson (1872–1944), Prime Minister of Belgium (1937–1938)
- Philippe Lamberts (born 1963), politician
- Adolphe Max (1869–1939), politician and Mayor of Brussels from 1909 until 1939
- Amal mint Maouloud (born 1983), Mauritanian engineer and politician
- Annemie Neyts (born 1944), politician, former president of the Liberal International, president of the European Liberal Democrat and Reform Party
- Charles-Ferdinand Nothomb (1936–2023), politician
- Étienne Pinte (born 1939), French MP and mayor of Versailles
- Paul-Henri Spaak (1899–1972), Prime Minister of Belgium (1938–1939, 1946 and 1947–1949), President of the United Nations General Assembly (1946–1957), Secretary-General of NATO (1957–1961)
- Emile Vandervelde (1866–1938), President from 1900 of the Second International

=== Artists ===
==== Cinema ====
- Chantal Akerman (1950–2015), filmmaker and director
- Patrick Bauchau (born 1938), actor
- Gérard Corbiau (born 1941), film director
- Thierry De Mey (born 1956), film director and composer
- Jacques Feyder (1885–1948), screenwriter and international film director, one of the founders of poetic realism in French cinema
- Fernand Gravey (1904–1970), also known as Fernand Gravet, film actor
- Audrey Hepburn (1929–1993), Anglo-Dutch actress, fashion model, and humanitarian
- Helena Noguerra (born 1969), actress, singer and television presenter
- Raymond Rouleau (1904–1981), actor and film director
- Jean-Claude Van Damme (born 1960), actor, nicknamed "The Muscles from Brussels"
- Jaco Van Dormael (born 1957 in Ixelles), film director
- Alexandra Vandernoot (born 1965), actress
- Agnès Varda (1928–2019), French film director

==== Performance / dance ====
- Akarova (Marguerite Acarin, 1904–1991), dancer, choreographer and artist
- Jan De Cock (born 1976), visual artist
- Clémentine de Vère (1888–1973), magician and illusionist
- Hilda Madsen (1910–1981), British-American artist and dog breeder

==== Music ====
- Stromae (Paul van Haver) (born 1985) musician
- Plastic Bertrand (Roger Jouret) (born 1958), rock musician
- Jacques Brel (1929–1978), singer-songwriter and actor
- Jean-Luc De Meyer (born 1963), musician, lead singer of Front 242
- Lara Fabian (born Lara Crokaert, 1970), singer
- Richard Jonckheere (born 1965), musician, member of Front 242
- Magali Luyten (born 1978), singer
- Victor-Charles Mahillon (1841–1924), musician and writer on musical topics
- Brian Molko (born 1972), songwriter, lead vocalist and guitarist of the band Placebo
- Pierre Rapsat (1948–2002), singer and musician
- The Singing Nun (Jeanine Deckers) (1933–1985), member of a Dominican Convent, famous for her song "Dominique"
- Edna Stern (born 1977), pianist
- Toots Thielemans (1922–2016), jazz musician
- Tonia (born Arlette Antoine Dominicus, 1947), singer
- Angèle Van Laeken (born 1995), singer-songwriter
- Ghalia Volt (born 1982), blues rock musician and songwriter
- Régine Zylberberg (1929–2022), pioneer of the modern nightclub
- Penelope Antena (born 1987), musician

==== Painting / sculpture / architecture / other ====
- Pierre Alechinsky (born 1927), artist
- Richard Aurili, (1864–1943), sculptor
- Colijn de Coter (c. 1446–1538), Renaissance painter
- Lodewijk de Vadder (1605–1655), landscape painter
- Francois Duquesnoy (1597–1643), sculptor
- Alfred Jonniaux (1882–1974), portrait painter
- Constantin Meunier (1831–1905), painter and sculptor
- Joseph Noiret (1927–2012), painter, writer and poet
- Joseph Poelaert (1817–1879), architect, author of the Palace of Justice
- Hugo Puttaert (born 1960), graphic designer
- Paul Saintenoy (1862–1952), architect
- Jean Henri Simon (1752–1834), engraver and soldier
- Jean Stevo (1914–1974), painter and engraver
- Arnt van der Dussen, medieval tapestry maker
- Juliette Wytsman (1866–1925), painter
- Sophie Alouf-Bertot (born 1945), painter and graphic designer

==== Fashion ====
- Liz Claiborne (1929–2007), fashion designer
- Diane von Fürstenberg (born 1946), Belgian-American fashion designer
- Stella Maxwell (born 1990), Belgian born British fashion model

=== Literature / cartoon ===
- Julio Cortázar (1914–1984), Argentine novelist and poet
- Jacques Danois (1927–2008), actor, journalist, writer
- Michel De Ghelderode (1898–1962), dramatist
- André Fontainas (1865–1948), Symbolist poet and critic
- André Franquin (1924–1997), cartoonist
- Jacqueline Harpman (1929–2012), novelist
- Hergé (Georges Remi) (1907–1983), Belgian cartoonist, creator of The Adventures of Tintin
- Edgar P. Jacobs (1904–1987), comics writer, created the series that made him famous, Blake and Mortimer
- Auguste Jouhaud (1805–1888), writer and playwright
- Camille Lemonnier (1844–1913), writer
- Pierre Mertens (born 1939), writer, director of the Centre de sociologie de la littérature at the Université libre de Bruxelles
- Henri Horace Meyer (1801–1870), French dramatist and novelist
- Jeanine Moulin (1912–1998), poet and literary scholar
- Paul Nougé (1895–1967), surrealist poet and philosopher
- Hubert Nyssen (1925–2011), Belgian-French writer
- Peyo (Pierre Culliford) (1928–1992), illustrator and creator of The Smurfs
- Edmond Picard (1836–1924), jurist and writer
- François Schuiten (born 1956), comics artist
- Benoît Sokal (1954–2021), Belgian comic artist and video game developer
- Charles Spaak (1903–1975), screenwriter
- Philippe Tome (Philippe Vandevelde) (1957–2019), comic strip writer
- Jean-Philippe Toussaint (born 1957), writer, Prix Médicis 2005
- Jean Van Hamme (born 1939), novelist and scenario writer of comic books
- Geert van Istendael (born 1947), writer
- François Weyergans (1941–2019), writer, Prix Goncourt 2005
- Marguerite Yourcenar (1903–1987), French writer and first female member of the Académie française

=== Scientists ===
- Jean-Jacques Cassiman (1943–2022), researcher and professor of human genetics
- François d'Aguilon or Aguilonius (1546–1617), mathematician and physicist
- Pierre Deligne (born 1944), mathematician
- François Englert (1932–2026), Nobel Prize in Physics 2013
- Robert Goldschmidt (1877–1935), chemist and physician
- Éliane Gubin (born 1942), Belgian historian, researcher and professor
- Friedrich Moritz Hartogs (1874–1943), German-Jewish mathematician
- Jean Jeener (1931–2023), physical chemist and physicist
- Claude Lévi-Strauss (1908–2009), French anthropologist
- Joseph Plateau (1801–1883), physicist; invented an early stroboscopic device, the phenakistiscope
- Jacques Tits (1930–2021), Belgian-French mathematician
- Jan Baptist van Helmont (1579–1644), chemist, physiologist and physician
- Pierre François Verhulst (1804–1849), mathematician
- Andreas Vesalius (1514–1564), anatomist and author of the first complete textbook on human anatomy, De Humani Corporis Fabrica (On the Workings of the Human Body)
- Daniel Zajfman (born 1959), Israeli physicist; president of the Weizmann Institute

=== Intellectuals / religion ===
- Victor Amédée Jacques Marie Coremans (1802–1872), archivist, journalist, and historian
- Pieter Crockaert (1470–1514), philosopher and theologian of the Southern Netherlands
- Henri La Fontaine (1854–1943), lawyer and president of the International Peace Bureau, Nobel Peace Prize in 1913
- Henri Kichka (1926–2020), writer and Holocaust survivor
- Xavier de Mérode (1820–1874), prelate, archbishop and statesman of the Papal states
- Victor Serge (1890–1947), Russian revolutionary
- Pascal Vanderveeren (born 1946), lawyer and president of the International Criminal Bar
- Louise van den Plas (1877–1968), suffragist, activist

=== Sports ===
- Henri Anspach (1882–1979), épée (Olympic champion) and foil fencer
- Paul Anspach (1882–1991), épée and foil fencer, two-time Olympic champion
- Thierry Boutsen (born 1957), Formula One driver
- Raymond Goethals (1921–2004), (national) soccer trainer; his team Olympique de Marseille won the 1993 European Cup
- Georges Grün (born 1962), football (soccer) defender
- Jacky Ickx (born 1945), racing driver
- Aaron Leya Iseka (born 1997), footballer
- Manu Lecomte (born 1995), basketball player in the Israeli Basketball Premier League
- Paul Loicq (1888–1953), president of the International Ice Hockey Federation
- Vincent Kompany (born 1986), football (soccer) player
- Axel Merckx (born 1972), son of Eddy Merckx, professional road bicycle racer, bronze medal Olympic road race 2004
- Noah Sadiki (born 2004), footballer
- Tarec Saffiedine (born 1986), martial artist
- Philippe Thys (1890–1971), cyclist and three-time winner of the Tour de France
- Ivo Van Damme (1954–1976), middle distance runner, silver medals at the 1976 Summer Olympics, in both the 800m and 1500m; Memorial van Damme in Brussels, one of the major track and field meets of the season, named in his honour
- Constant Vanden Stock (1914–2008), president and player of Brussels football club RSC Anderlecht
- Franky Vercauteren (born 1956), football left winger in RSC Anderlecht and R.W.D. Molenbeek, football manager in RSC Anderlecht and national soccer trainer
- Nafissatou Thiam (born 1994), athlete, three-time Olympic champion

=== Miscellaneous ===
- Augustine De Rothmaler (1859–1942), pedagogue, feminist
- Marc Dutroux (born 1956), serial criminal
- Maxime Weygand (1867–1965), French military commander
- Claude Frédéric t'Serclaes, Count of Tilly (1648–1723), Dutch States Army commander

== Life and work in Brussels ==
Following notable people lived or worked in Brussels at least during a certain period of their life.

- Jean Absil (1893–1974), composer, organist, and professor at the Brussels Conservatory
- Nicolas Ancion (born 1971), writer, lived and worked 1994–2000 in Brussels
- Henryk Arctowski (1871–1958), scientist and Arctic explorer, worked at the Royal Observatory of Belgium from 1903 to 1909
- Arno (1949–2022), rock artist from Ostend, lived a while in Brussels
- Maurice Béjart (1927–2007), French choreographer; founded the Ballet du XXe Siècle in 1960 and the Mudra School in 1970, both in Brussels
- Jules Bordet (1870–1961), immunologist and microbiologist; founded the Pasteur Institute in Brussels; inner of the 1919 Nobel Prize in Medicine
- Jeroen Brouwers (1940–2022), Dutch author, lived from 1964 until 1976 in Brussels
- Pieter Brueghel the Elder (c. 1525–1569), painter
- Jan Bucquoy (born 1945), filmmaker and director
- Gerald Bull (1928–1990), Canadian engineer, lived and assassinated in Uccle
- Hendrik Conscience (1812–1883), writer
- Alexandra David-Néel (1868–1969), explorer and writer
- Anne Teresa de Keersmaeker (born 1960), choreographer; founded the dance company Rosas in 1983 and the dance school P.A.R.T.S. in 1995 in Brussels
- Marc Didden (born 1949) film director, made Brussels By Night (1983)
- Adil El Arbi (born 1988), film director
- Desiderius Erasmus (c. 1466–1536), humanist and theologian; lived in Anderlecht (Erasmus House) from 31 May until 28 October 1521
- M. C. Escher (1898–1972), Dutch graphic designer, lived in Uccle from 1937 to 1971
- François-Joseph Fétis (1784–1871), musicologist, composer, critic and teacher, one of the most influential music critics of the 19th century; became director of the conservatory of Brussels and the chapelmaster of King Leopold I
- Jan Greshoff (1888–1971), Dutch writer, lived from 1927 until 1939 in Schaerbeek on the August Reyerslaan 130
- Ania Guédroïtz (born 1949), Belgian actress
- Willem Frederik Hermans (1921–1995), Dutch author.
- Victor Horta (1861–1947), architect, one of the most influential European Art Nouveau architects
- Enver Hoxha (1908–1985), Albanian dictator, worked as secretary at the Albanian consulate in Brussels from 1934 to 1936
- Nicholas Lens (born 1957), author, composer
- René Magritte (1898–1967), surrealist artist
- Ian McCulloch (born 1959), singer of the English rock band Echo & the Bunnymen
- Eddy Merckx (born 1945), considered by many to be the greatest cyclist of all-time; spent youth and adolescence in Brussels
- Jef Mermans (1922–1996), nicknamed "The Bomber", football striker who played much of his career at RSC Anderlecht
- Edward Mosberg (1926–2022), Polish-American Holocaust survivor, educator, and philanthropist
- Eugene Nida (1914–2011), linguist, developer of the dynamic-equivalence Bible-translation theory
- Amélie Nothomb (born 1967), novelist, writing in French
- Emma Orczy (1865–1947), Hungarian-British novelist, spent part of her childhood in Brussels (1868 to 1873)
- Marius Petipa (1818–1910), French ballet choreographer, lived in Brussels from 1824 to 1834 and studied at the Royal Conservatory
- Ilya Prigogine (1917–2003), physicist and chemist; studied chemistry in Brussels and was appointed in 1959 director of the International Solvay Institute in Brussels; awarded the 1977 Nobel Prize in Chemistry
- Adolphe Quetelet (1796–1874), astronomer, mathematician, statistician and sociologist; founded and directed the Brussels Observatory; inventor of the body mass index
- Vini Reilly (Vincent Reilly, born 1953), rock musician, guitarist of the English band The Durutti Column; performed on Morrissey's first solo album in 1988
- Jan van Ruysbroeck (also known as Jan van den Berghe), architect of the 15th century; amongst his work is the belfry of Brussels' Town Hall
- John of Ruysbroeck (or Jan, Jean, Johannes) (c. 1293–1381), "mystic", priest in Brussels and Groenendaal
- Jan Zygmunt Skrzynecki (1787–1860), Polish general, high-ranking officer of the Belgian army from 1832 to 1839
- Ernest Solvay (1838–1922), chemist, industrialist and philanthropist; founded institutes and the Solvay Business School in Brussels
- Nicolas de Staël (born Nikolai Vladimirovich Stael von Holstein, 1914–1955), Russian-French abstract painter; lived in Uccle from 1922 to the early 1930; studied at the Royal Academy of Fine Arts
- Olivier Strelli (born Nissim Israël, 1946), fashion designer
- Pieter Coecke van Aelst (1502–1550), painter
- Rogier van der Weyden (c. 1399–1464), painter
- Emond van Dynter (c. 1370–1449), writer
- Vincent van Gogh (1853–1890), Dutch painter, studied at the Royal Academy of Fine Arts in Brussels from 1880 to 1881
- Paul Van Himst (born 1943), nicknamed Polle Gazon, football player, four-times winner of the Belgian Golden Shoe award, eight-times winner of the Belgian championship with RSC Anderlecht
- Bernaert van Orley (c. 1488–1541), Renaissance painter
- Johan Verminnen (born 1951), singer-songwriter
- George Washington (1871–1946), inventor and first commercial producer of instant coffee, grew up in Brussels
- Henryk Wieniawski (1835–1880), violinist and composer, taught at the Royal Conservatory of Brussels from 1874 to 1877
- Antoine Wiertz (1806–1865), painter and sculptor
- Jan Yoors (1922–1977), Flemish artist, studied at La Cambre from 1941 to 1942

== Died in Brussels ==
=== Politicians ===
- Everard t'Serclaes (c. 1320–1388), Brabantian magistrate and folk hero

== Brussels as a safe harbor ==
Brussels was known to be a safe harbor for artists and thinkers facing political (or simply criminal) persecution. This was particularly true during the 19th century, although it was a cause of some debate, and policies were prone to change (e.g. the case of Karl Marx and Friedrich Engels, who were expelled from the city in 1848).

- Charles Baudelaire (1821–1867), French poet
- Louis Blanc (1811–1882), French poet, French politician and historian
- Georges Boulanger (1837–1891), French general and politician
- Jacques-Louis David (1748–1825), French painter
- José de San Martin (1824–1830), Argentine General and 1st President of Peru
- Alexandre Dumas, père (1802–1870), French author, known for his historical novels
- Friedrich Engels (1820–1895), German social scientist and political philosopher, co-author of The Communist Manifesto
- Willem Frederik Hermans (1921–1995), Dutch writer
- Victor Hugo (1802–1885), one of the most influential French writers of the 19th century; completed Les Misérables in Brussels
- Joachim Lelewel (1786–1861), Polish historian and politician, associate of Karl Marx, lived in Brussels from 1833 to 1861
- Karl Marx (1818–1883), German political philosopher, wrote The Communist Manifesto in Brussels
- Multatuli (Eduard Douwes Dekker) (1820–1887), Dutch author, wrote his masterpiece Max Havelaar in 1859 in Brussels
- Cyprian Norwid (1821–1883), Polish poet, stayed in Brussels from August 1846 to January 1847 after his expulsion from Prussia
- Pierre-Joseph Proudhon (1809–1865), French philosopher, the first individual to call himself an "anarchist"
- Auguste Rodin (1840–1917), French sculptor
- Paul Verlaine (1844–1896), French poet; was joined briefly by the French poet Arthur Rimbaud
