= Pelizzari =

Surname list

Pelizzari is a surname. Notable people with the surname include:

- Denis Pelizzari (born 1960), French cyclist
- Federico Pelizzari (born 2000), Italian para alpine skier
- Umberto Pelizzari (born 1965), Italian freediver

== See also ==
- Pellizzari (disambiguation)
