= The Greeks and the Trojans Fighting over the Body of Patroclus =

1836 and 1844 paintings by Antoine Wiertz

- Les Grecs et les Troyens se disputant le corps de Patrocle and Grieken en Trojanen vechten om het lijk van Patroclus (French)
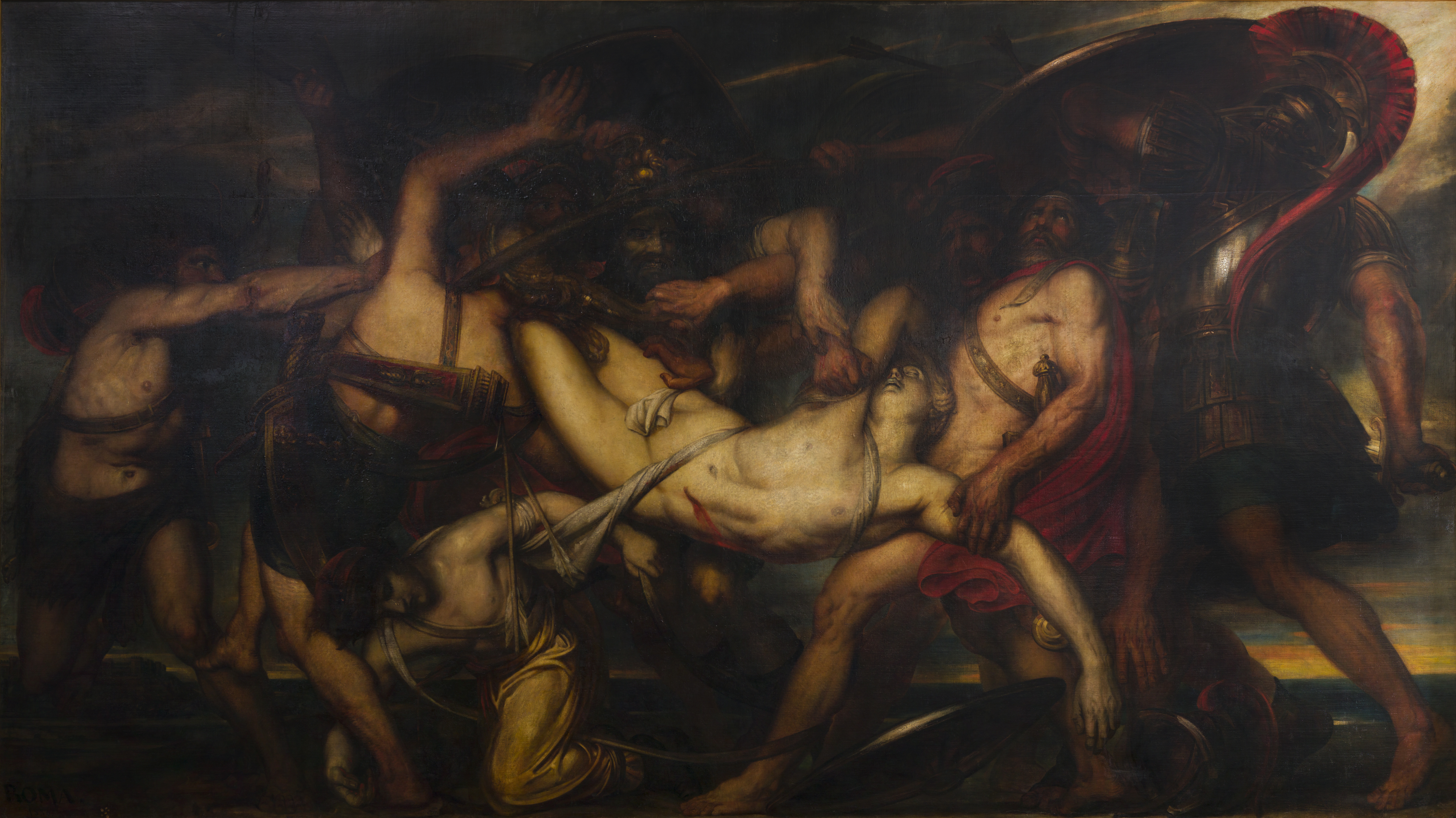
- Artist: Antoine Wiertz
- Year: 1836
- Medium: oil on canvas
- Dimensions: 395 cm × 703 cm (156 in × 277 in)
- Location: Musée des beaux-arts de Liège; Liège

The Greeks and the Trojans Fighting over the Body of Patroclus is an oil painting by Antoine Wiertz. Several versions of the painting exist. The first was made in year 1836 (Musée des beaux-arts de Liège).

== Description ==
The painting's dimensions are 395 x 703 centimeters. It is in the collection of the Wiertz Museum, one of the Royal Museums of Fine Arts of Belgium.

== Gallery ==
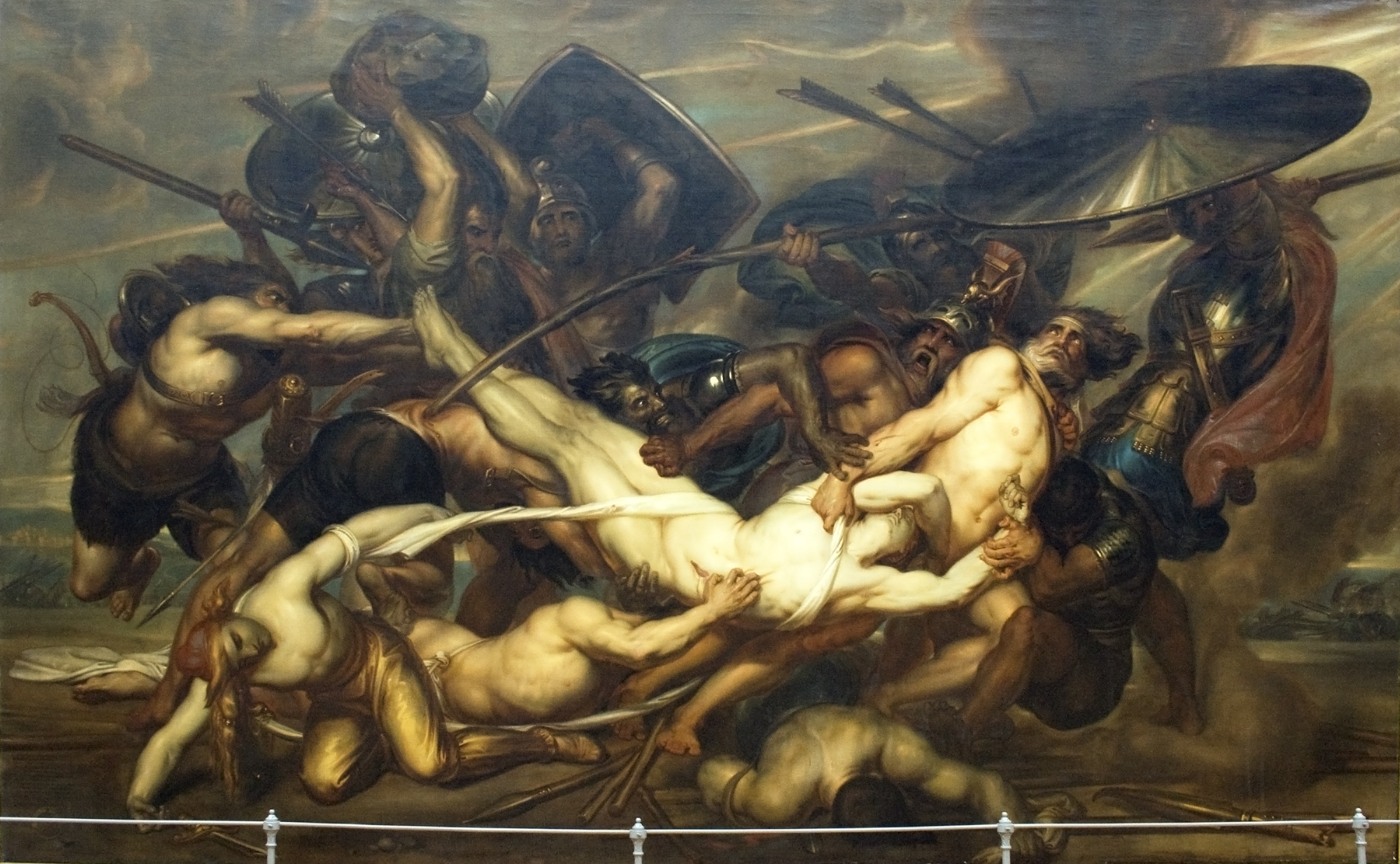
From Wiertz Museum (1844)

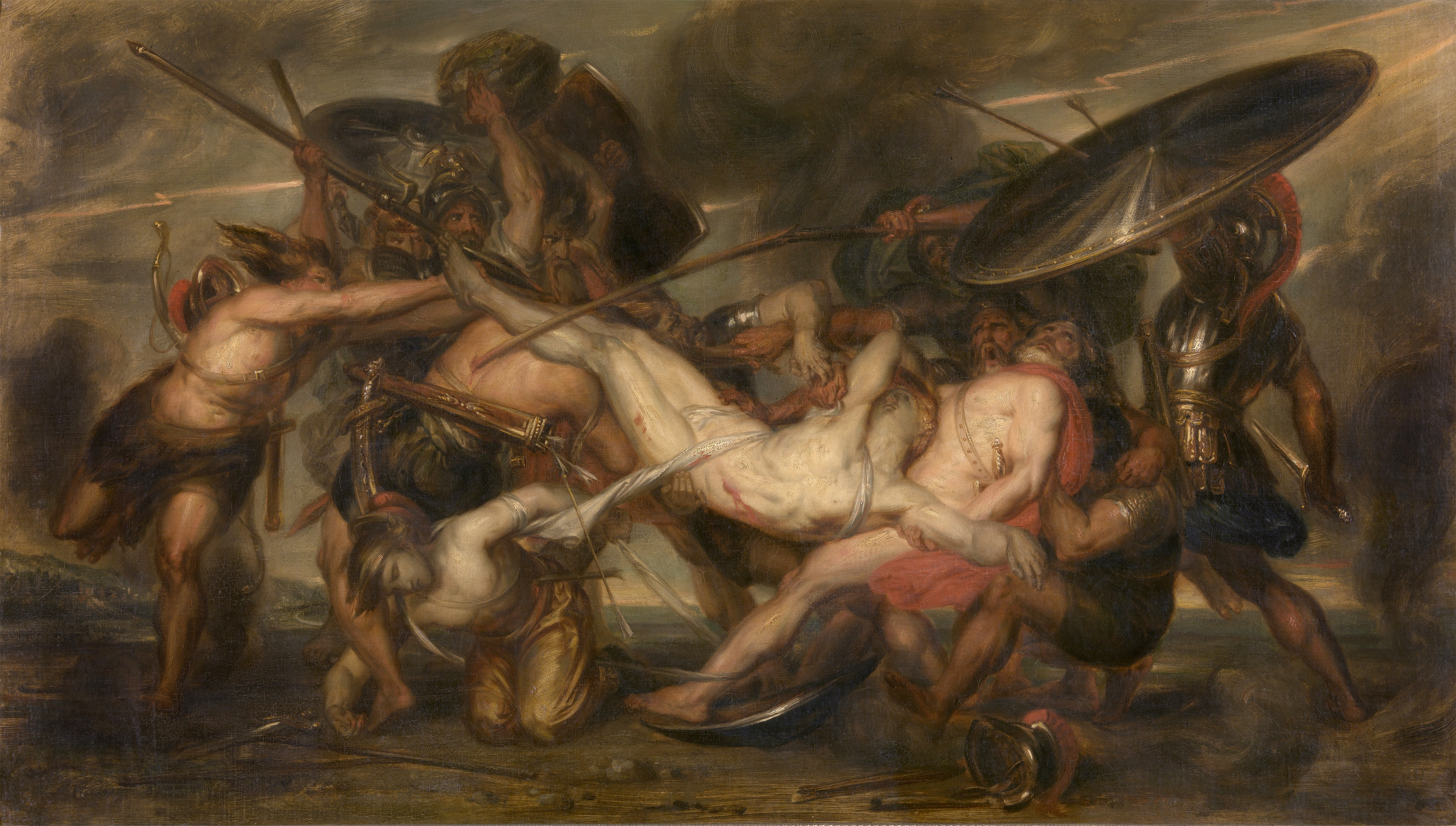
Smaller copy in KMSKA
