= Pellizzari (surname) =

Pelizzari is an Italian surname ultimately derived from the occupation of furrier: pellicia means 'fur'. Notable people with the surname include:

- Bruno Pellizzari (1907–1991), Italian cyclist
- Juan Masferrer Pellizzari (1940–2017), Chilean politician
- Paolo Pellizzari (born 1956), Italian photographer
- Pellizzari reaction, a chemical reaction between an amide and a hydrazide
- Umberto Pelizzari (born 1965), Italian freediver
- Stefano Pellizzari (born 1997), Italian footballer
- Giulio Pellizzari (born 2003), Italian cyclist
