= Paolo Pellizzari =

Italian photographer (born 1956)

Paolo Pellizzari (born 7 February 1956), is an Italian-born photographer living in Brussels, Belgium. Pellizzari teaches author photography at La Cambre School of Art in Brussels and is a guest teacher at the International Center for Photography in New York City.

== Eaely life and education ==
Paolo Pellizzari was born on 7 February 1956.

He studied architecture at the Université catholique de Louvain and business at INSEAD (Fontainebleau campus).

== Career ==
Pellizzari's photographic work finds its roots in the German school of photography. His panoramic pictures featuring crowds and human landscapes makes his work distinctive among others. His work is shown in museums and art galleries.

=== Pre-photography ===
Before being a photographer, Pellizzari worked in the business world, starting in 1981.

From 1981 to 1984, he worked as a consultant at the Boston Consulting Group in France.

From 1984 to 1989, Pellizzari was the founder and general manager of the Kiel Corporation in New Hampshire. There, he designed hand-held computers with a touchscreen and a built-in modem. Ultimately, the company was sold to the Japanese company Murata Manufacturing.

From 1989 to 1992, he worked as an executive director of Neuhaus-Mondose in Belgium, overseeing the manufacturing of luxury chocolates.

From 1992 to 1999, Pellizzari was the owner of Inducolor SA in Belgium and worked with the venture-capital arm of Li & Fung. After eight years of management, he sold Inducolor SA and quit the business world.

=== Photography ===
Starting in 1999, Pellizzari dedicated all his time to photography.and became an independent photographer.

His first exhibition was in Brussels with Moving Art. He was awarded first prize for Grand Prix d’auteur Couleur de France. He followed with an exhibition in Paris entitled Around the World and other group exhibitions on the same theme.

In 2000, Pellizzari published a book entitled La France du Tour and in 2005, The Tours of the World. This book was awarded the 2006 Best Sport Book of the year.

In 2001, he had a solo exhibition at the Museum of Modern Art in Hasselt and entered into an agreement to cover the Tour de France for the French newspaper Libération.

In 2002, Pellizzari had two group exhibitions with the Museum of Photography in Charleroi and Recyclart. He published l'Equipe, Vélo Magazine and was photographer for Libération at the FIFA World Cup.

Later, he had other exhibits at Couleur Café, at the Queen Galleries in Brussels for his work entitled One Billion Indians, at Young Gallery in Brussels, Husson, le Musée de la photographie in Charleroi and the Château d'Eau in Toulouse.

In 2008, Pellizzari worked on "Extrattitude.com", an initiative to promote as a photographer extraordinary people around the world.

In 2008 and 2009, he directed two films, Inspirations and The Proof of the Sun, respectively.

In 2010, Pellizzari produced a book with his body of work called The Broad Way and exhibited at the Italian Pavilion at the World Expo in Shanghai.

In 2011, after some time spent in Puerta del Sol in Madrid with the Indignados, he sponsored an initiative to create a dialogue web site called www.eskutcha.com.

In 2013, Pellizzari's work was shown in New York City at Anastasia Photo Gallery.

Pellizzari teaches author photography at the International Center of Photography (ICP) in New York City and at the l'Ecole Nationale d'Art de Lacambre in Brussels.

His work for the press is distributed by Agence Vu in Paris and Contact Press Images in New York City.

== Publications ==
- 2001 – La France du Tour (Editions Catleya)
- 2003 – One Billion Indians (Editions 5 Continents Milan)
- 2005 – Tours of the World (Editions 5 Continents Milan)
- 2006 – Family Shops (Editions 5 Continents Milan)
- 2007 – Paris Metro (Editions Michel Husson Brussels)
- 2009 – 9*20 (Editions Edern Brussels )
- 2011 – The Broad Way (Eyetopic and Petercam )

== See also ==
- List of Italian artists
- List of people from Brussels
- List of photographers
