= LUCA School of Arts =

Art college in Belgium

Coordinates: 50°51′41.38″N 4°22′00.38″E

- Hogeschool Sint-Lukas Brussel
- Type: Art school
- Established: 1880; 146 years ago
- Students: 4,000
- Location: Schaerbeek, Brussels, Belgium
- Website: www.sintlukas.be

Hogeschool Sint-Lukas Brussel (the "LUCA School of Arts") is an independent Flemish art school based in the Schaerbeek municipality of Brussels, Belgium. It is a predominantly Dutch-speaking institution located on the Rue des Palais/Paleizenstraat, and at another site, within reachable distance of Brussels-North railway station.

The Hogeschool provides exclusively art-related university-level higher education, hence the name. It houses around 4,000 students across its academic provision, and can trace its roots back to the first foundation of a Sint-Lukas art school in 1880. The school offers master programmes (four years) across the disciplines of audio-visual arts, graphic and publicity design, photography and fine art and bachelor programmes in interior design and construction. It also organizes Transmedia, a postgraduate programme for art students.

The Hogeschool actively encourages student mobility, and maintains several links with art schools across the continent through the Socrates programme and the Erasmus programme, with language of instruction to exchange students being English in the appropriate circumstances.

It is closely associated with the Sint-Lukas gallery in the city, showcasing contemporary art and its documentation.

== Name ==
The name "LUCA School of Arts" is a reference to Sint-Lukas (Saint Luke), the name given a number of schools of the Saint-Luc Institutes and Schools of Art (Instituts Saint-Luc or Sint-Lucas instituten), of which part of the Flemish institutes merged to create LUCA. Originally, however, the name "LUCA" was created as an acronym of "Leuven University College of Arts", as a result of the strengthening partnership between LUCA's preceding institutions and the Katholieke Universiteit te Leuven, through the KU Leuven Association and the transfer of the architecture departments to KU Leuven.

== Alumni ==
- Hugo Puttaert
- Miel Vandepitte

== See also ==
- Institut Saint-Luc, the independent French-speaking equivalent in Brussels with the same name
