= Wiertz Museum =

Art museum in Brussels, Belgium

- Musée Wiertz (French); Wiertz Museum (Dutch)
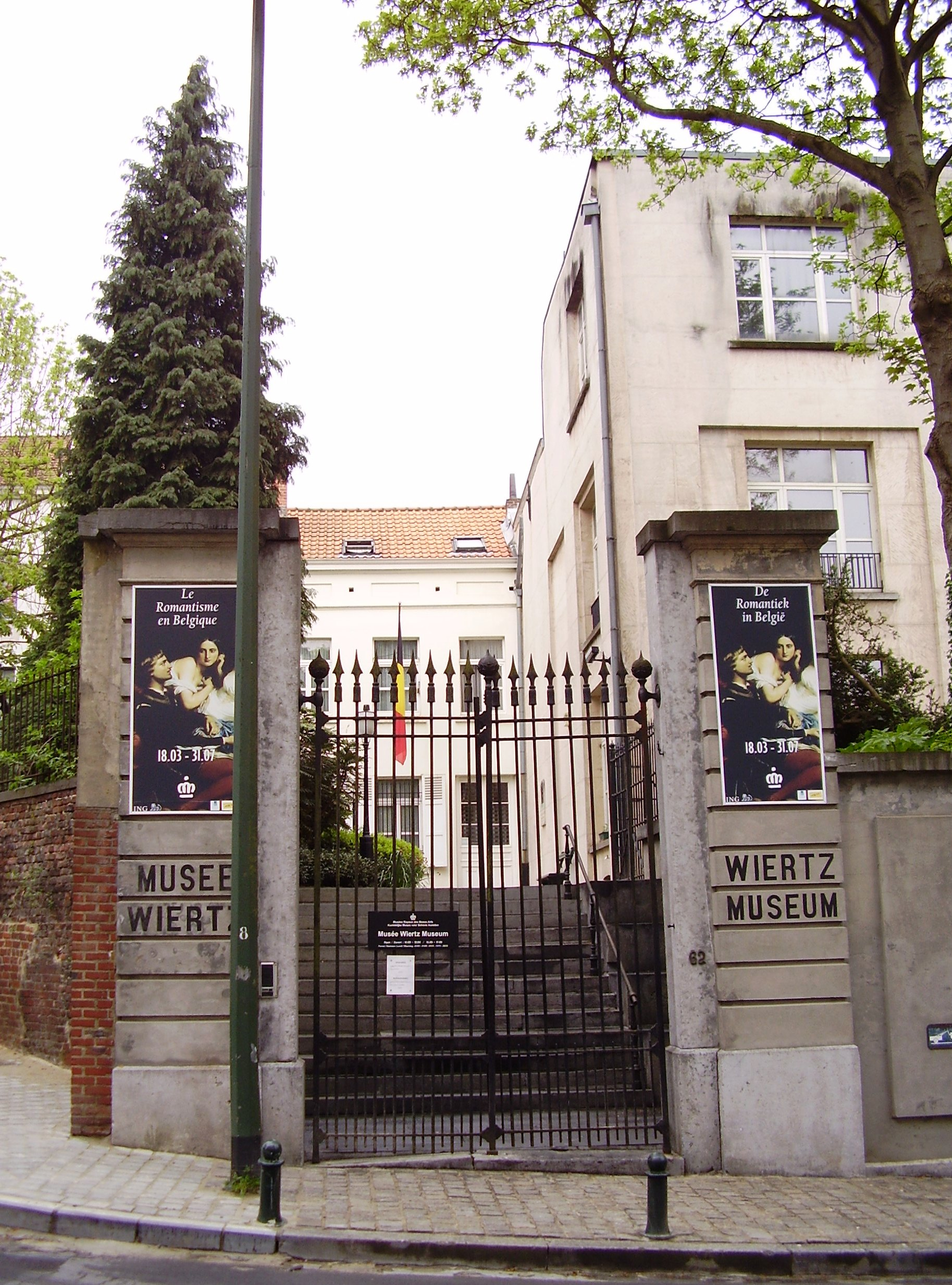
- Entrance to the museum
- Interactive fullscreen map
- Former name: Antoine Wiertz Museum
- Location: Rue Vautier / Vautierstraat 62, 1050 Ixelles, Brussels-Capital Region, Belgium
- Coordinates: 50°50′14″N 4°22′33″E
- Type: Art museum
- Website: www.fine-arts-museum.be/en/museums/musee-wiertz-museum

The Wiertz Museum (French: Musée Wiertz; Dutch: Wiertz Museum), formerly the Antoine Wiertz Museum (French: Musée Antoine Wiertz; Dutch: Antoine Wiertz Museum), is an art museum in Ixelles, a municipality of Brussels, Belgium, dedicated to the work of the romantic painter and sculptor Antoine Wiertz. It is one of the constituent museums of the Royal Museums of Fine Arts of Belgium.

== Description ==
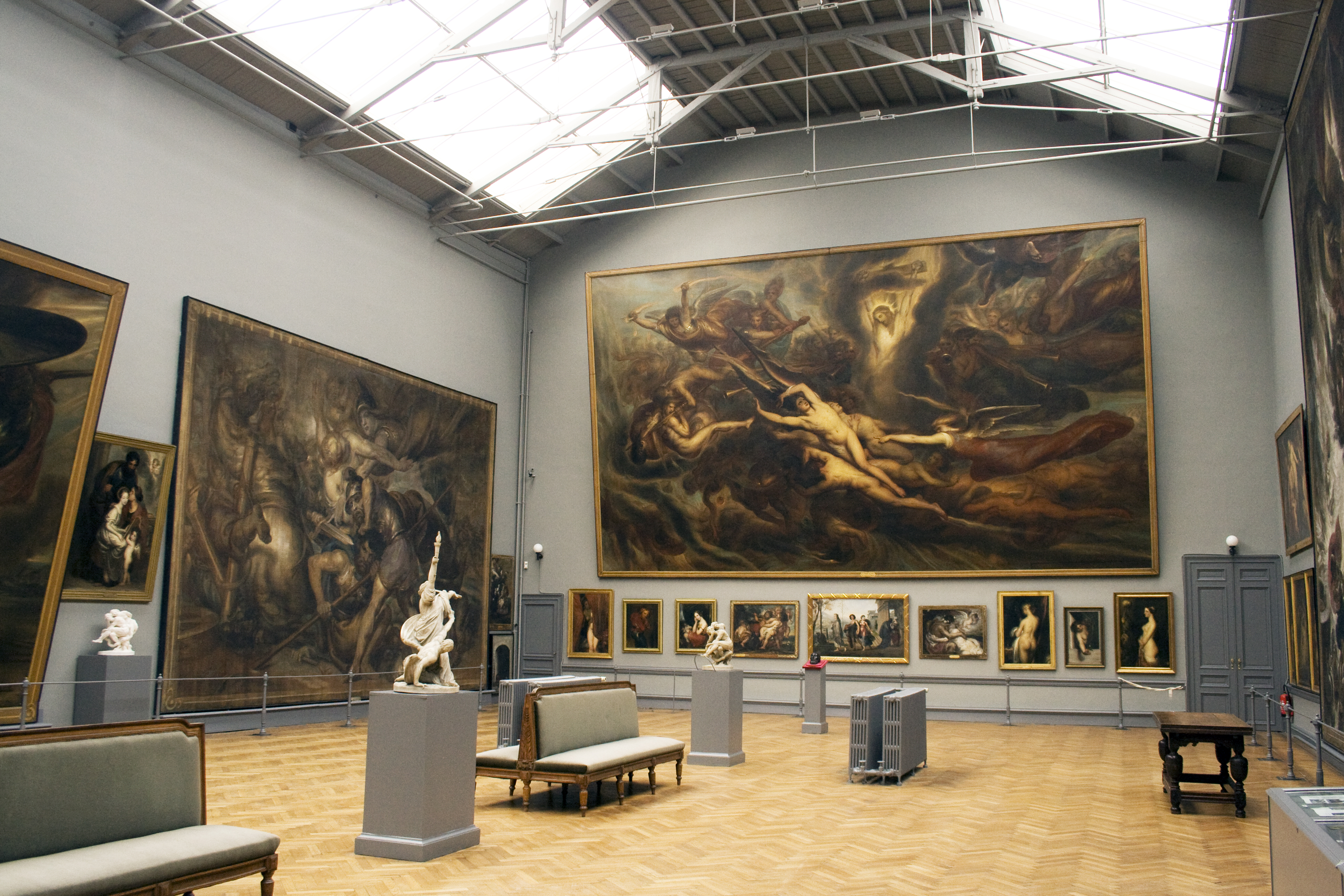
Main hall

The life and work of Antoine Wiertz are honoured in the artist's former studio at 62, rue Vautier/Vautierstraat, in the southern municipality of Ixelles. This museum offers a view of the monumental paintings, statues and sketches marked by the Belgian romantic movement. The construction of this workshop-museum was agreed in 1850 between Wiertz and the Belgian government. During the year following the artist's death, the entire collection of works then in his studio was bequeathed to the Belgian state. Since 1868, the Wiertz Museum has been part of the Royal Museums of Fine Arts of Belgium.

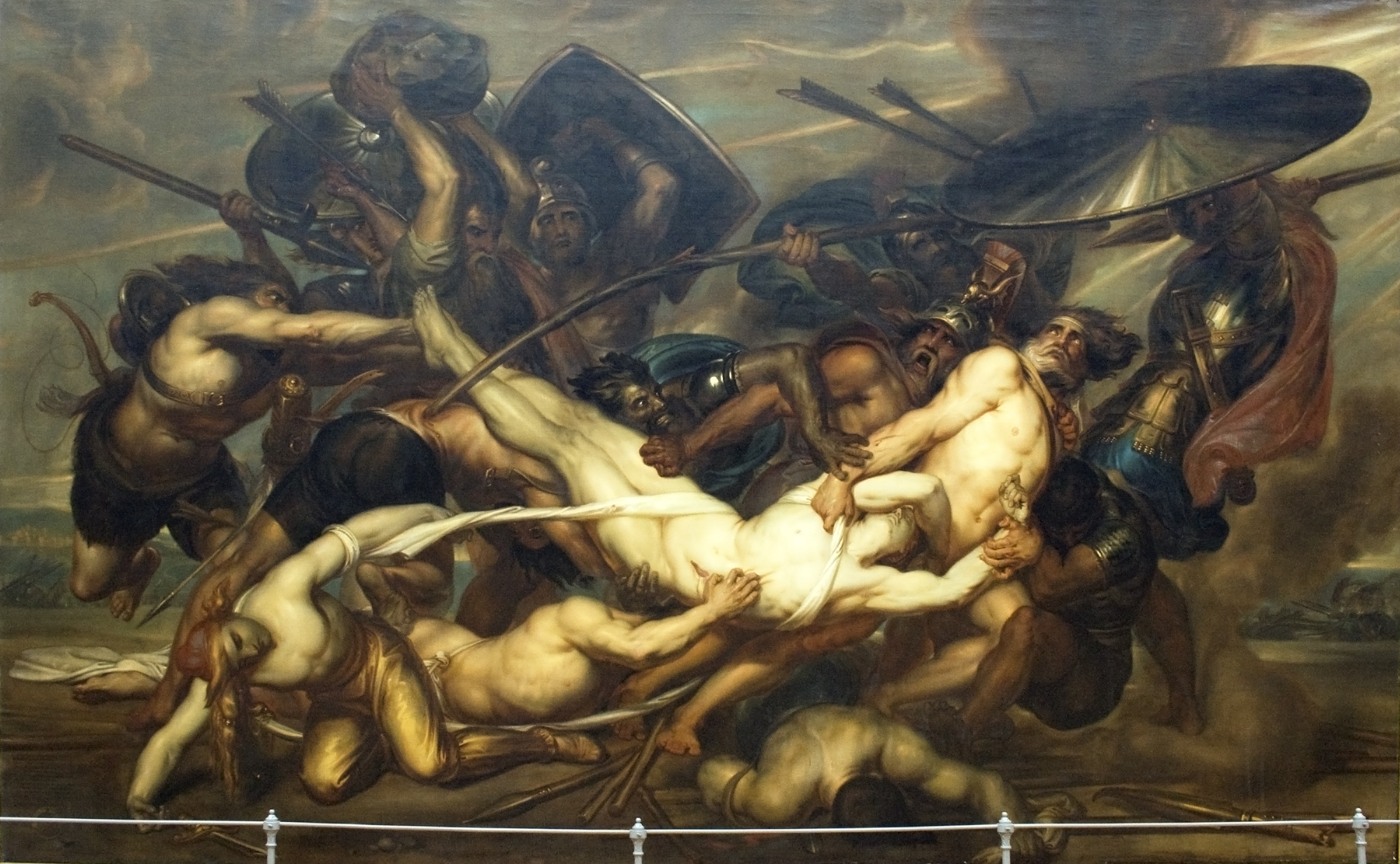
The Greeks and the Trojans Fighting over the Body of Patroclus

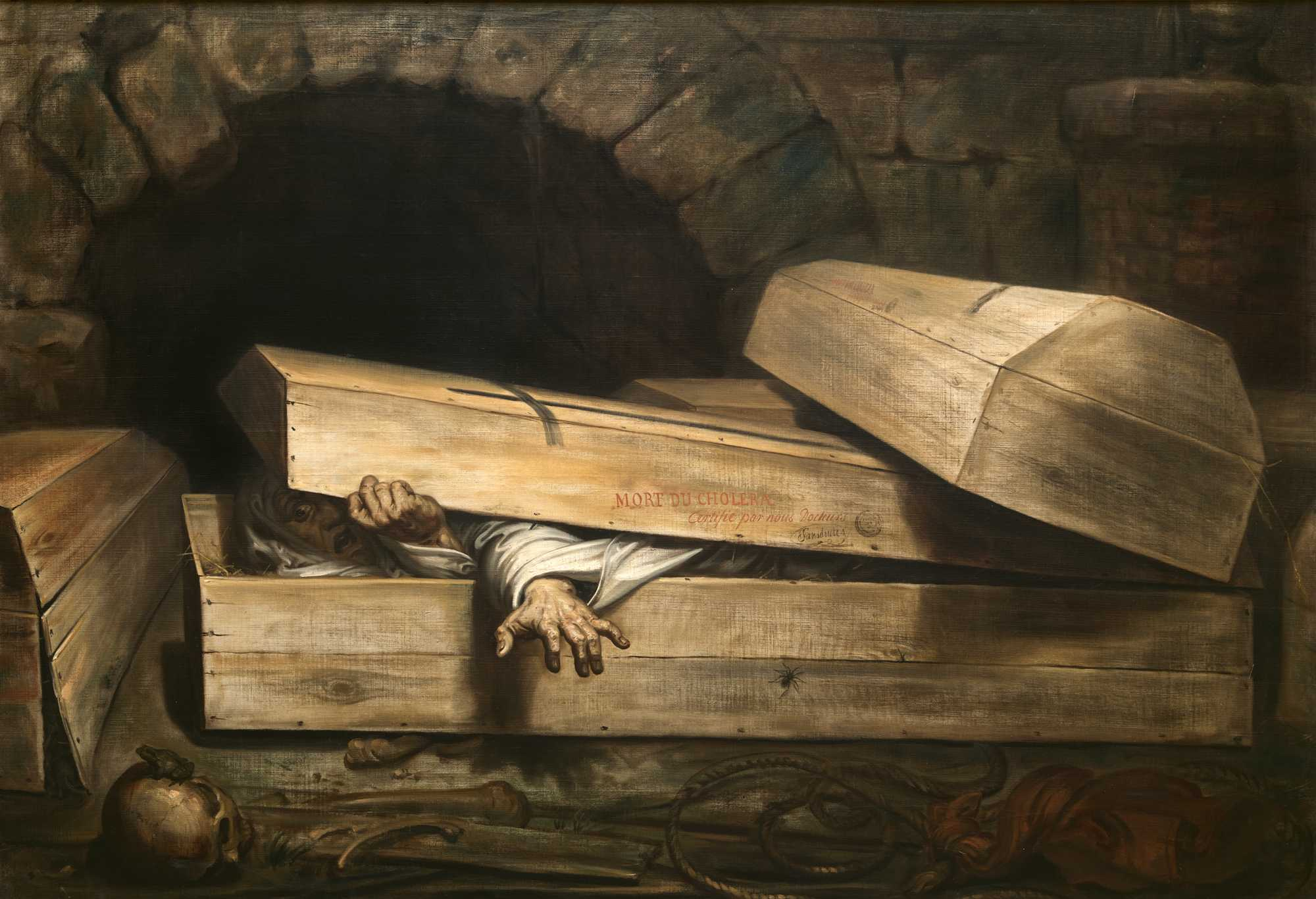
The Premature Burial

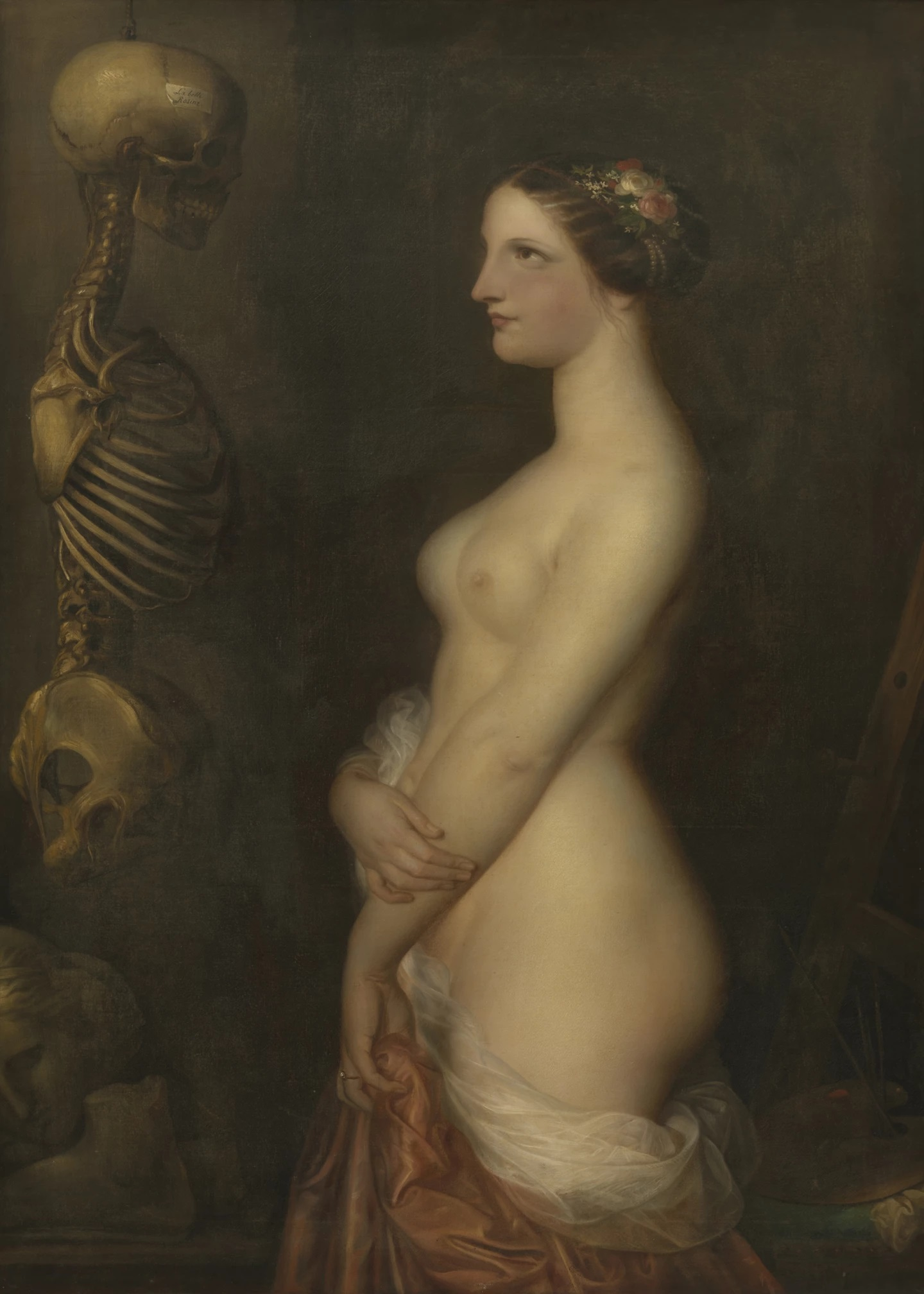
Two Young Girls (or The Beautiful Rosine)

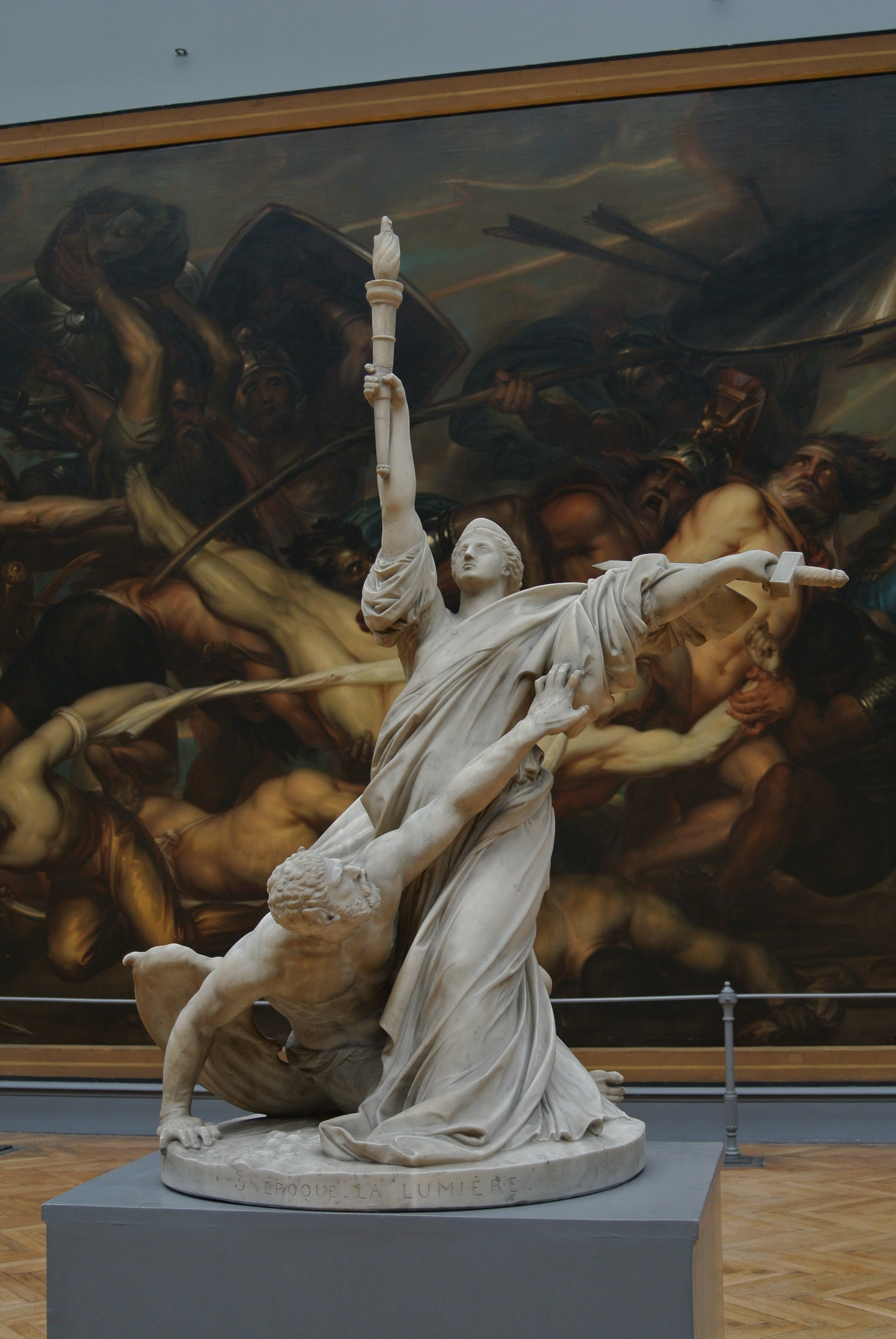
The Triumph of Light

== See also ==
- List of museums in Brussels
- List of single-artist museums
- Culture of Belgium
- Belgium in the long nineteenth century
