= Penelope Antena =

Franco-Belgian singer and songwriter

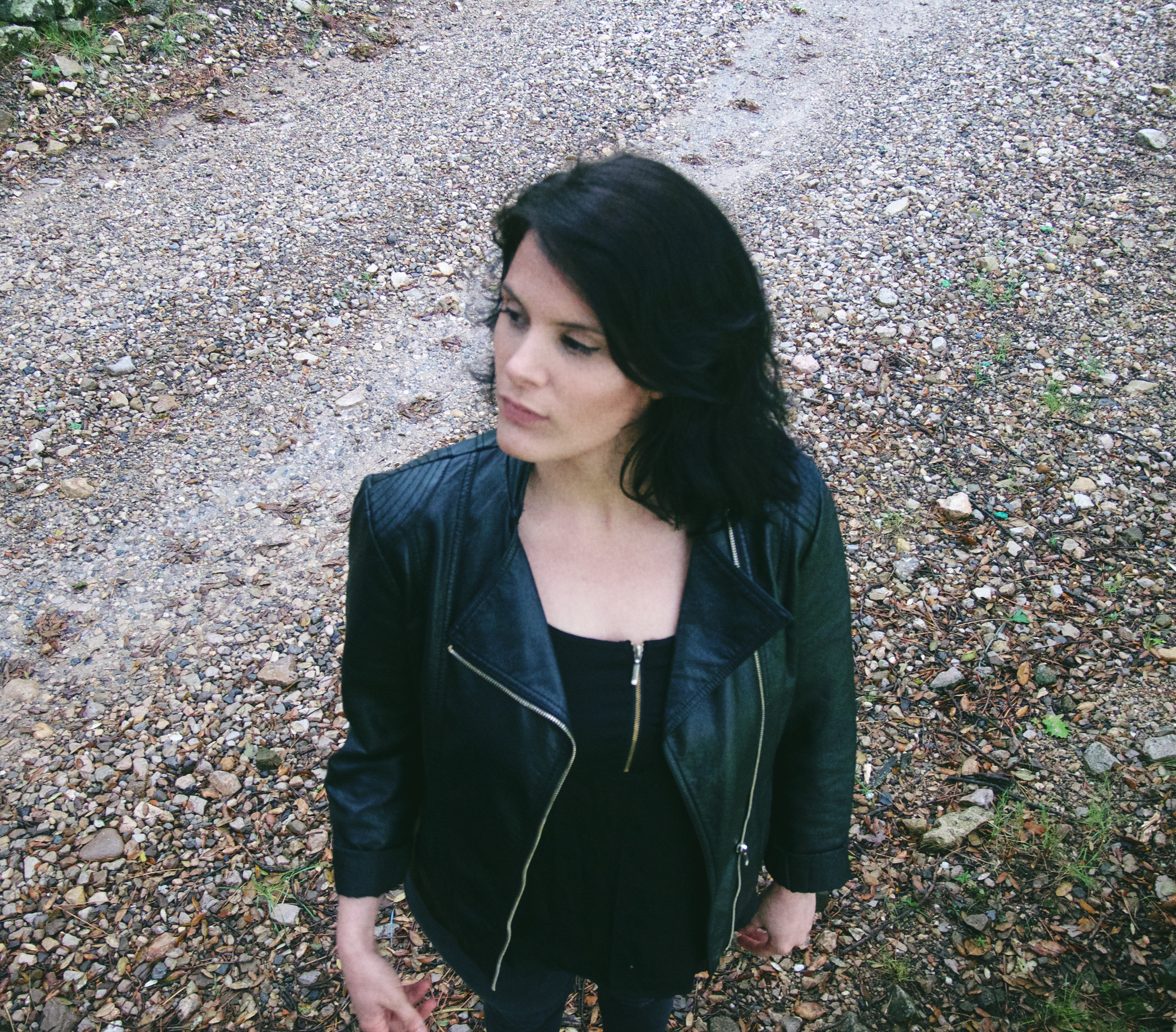
Penelope Antena

Penelope Antena (born Penelope Moulin; 2 September 1987 in Brussels) is a Franco-Belgian singer and songwriter.

Her parents set up a recording studio named Cedars Studio in the Cévennes. She taught herself to play the guitar, piano, and bass.

In 2022, she moved to Brest, France.

== Discography ==
- Antelope. Kowtow Records, 2019 (album).
- Honey Drips. Inner Ocean Records, 2021 (EP).
- James & June. Parapente Records, 2023 (album).
