= Jean Stevo =

Belgian painter and engraver

- Born: Justin Van Stynvoort; 28 May 1914; Brussels (Belgium)
- Died: 7 November 1974 (aged 60); Brussels (Belgium)
- Known for: Painting

Jean Stevo (28 May 1914 – 7 November 1974) was a Belgian painter and engraver.

== Biography ==
Born in Brussels in 1914, Stevo became active in European artistic life with his first exhibition in 1936. Among his friends and associates may be counted figures such as James Ensor, Félix Labisse, Jean Cocteau, René Magritte, Paul Delvaux, and Max Ernst. Jean Cassou, the Director of the National Museum of Modern Art in Paris commented on Stevo's work: "In his varied activities, Jean Stevo has devoted himself to a lyrical effusion, to the fantastic of the imagination, to the shadows of human destiny. the clear structure of his work clings to the page and, at the same time, animates it like a poem always vibrant with life." Jean Stevo was invited to participate in the Venice Biennal (Biennale di Venezia), both in 1954 and 1962. In 1969, at the invitation of John Hersey, he had a solo show at Yale University (April 27- May 27), followed by another show in 1972 at the Athena gallery (New Haven, Ct). A retrospective of Stevo'art work took place in 1975 under the auspices of the Maison française at Columbia University.

The paintings, drawings, and graphic works of Jean Stevo have been exhibited throughout the world. He was asked to exhibit at the Salon des Réalités Nouvelles at the Museum of Modern Art in Paris, the Biennale of Engraving at Lugano (1960), and the Biennale delle Regioni at Ancona (1968.) Stevo received wide critical acclaim, from the Prize in Engraving (Art Jeune, 1942) to the Critics Mendal of "La Nuova Critica Europea" (1969.) His works now figure in the principal museums and collections of Europe, including the Cabinet des Estampes of the Bibliothèque Nationale in Paris, the Rijksmuseum and Stedelijk Museum in Amsterdam, the National Museum of Cracow, Poland, the Royal Belgian Academy in Brussels, and the Harvard Art Center.

Stevo is also known for his poetry, short stories, and other writings. In 1973 the Académie royale de langue et de littérature françaises de Belgique awarded Jean Stevo the Léopold Rosy Prize for his book on Michel de Ghelderode.

=== Selected works ===
- La Chanson Grise, Paris, 1966
- La Nuit de Hollande, Paris,
- America-America, Paris,1969 (illustrations by Marie-Rose Mabille)
- Haute Solitude
- Lettres de Nulle Part, 1971 (poetry & etchings)
- James Ensor, Editions Germinal, 1947
- Marie Howet, Monographies de l'Art Belge, 1954
- Paul Maas, Monographies de l'Art Belge, 1961
- Hommage à James Ensor, Brepols, 1960
- Office des Ténèbres pour Michel de Ghelderode, 1972
- Cinematography: Le simple bonheur d'Edgard Tytgat, 1953 (with Steppé & Lovrix)
