= Antoine Wiertz =

Belgian artist (1806–1865)

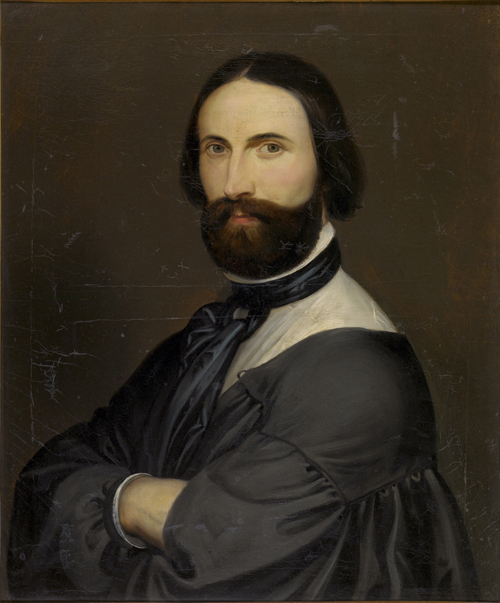
- Self-portrait of the artist in his studio attire, c. 1855
- Born: 22 February 1806; Dinant
- Died: 18 June 1865 (aged 59); Brussels
- Known for: Painting
- Movement: Romanticism, Realism, Symbolism

Antoine Joseph Wiertz (22 February 1806 – 18 June 1865) was a Belgian painter, sculptor, lithographer and art writer. He is known for his religious, historical, allegorical works, and portraits. An eccentric figure, he was originally much influenced by the works of Peter Paul Rubens and Michelangelo.

Some of his works are erotic and macabre and presage Belgian symbolism. While snubbed by contemporary art critics, he enjoyed the support of the new Belgian state, which, in return for his paintings, assisted him in building his personal studio and home in Brussels (now the Wiertz Museum), where the artist worked on his art and writings as a recluse.

== Early life ==
He was born in Dinant as the son of Louis-François Wiertz (born in Rocroi in 1782) and Catherine Disière, a daily wage earner (born in Leffe 1768-1844). His father had previously been a soldier in Napoleon I's army and was, from 1814 until his death in 1822, a brigadier in the military police of the United Kingdom of the Netherlands, His father reportedly instilled in him the ambition to become a great man. At an early age, he showed a talent for drawing, modelling and woodcarving.

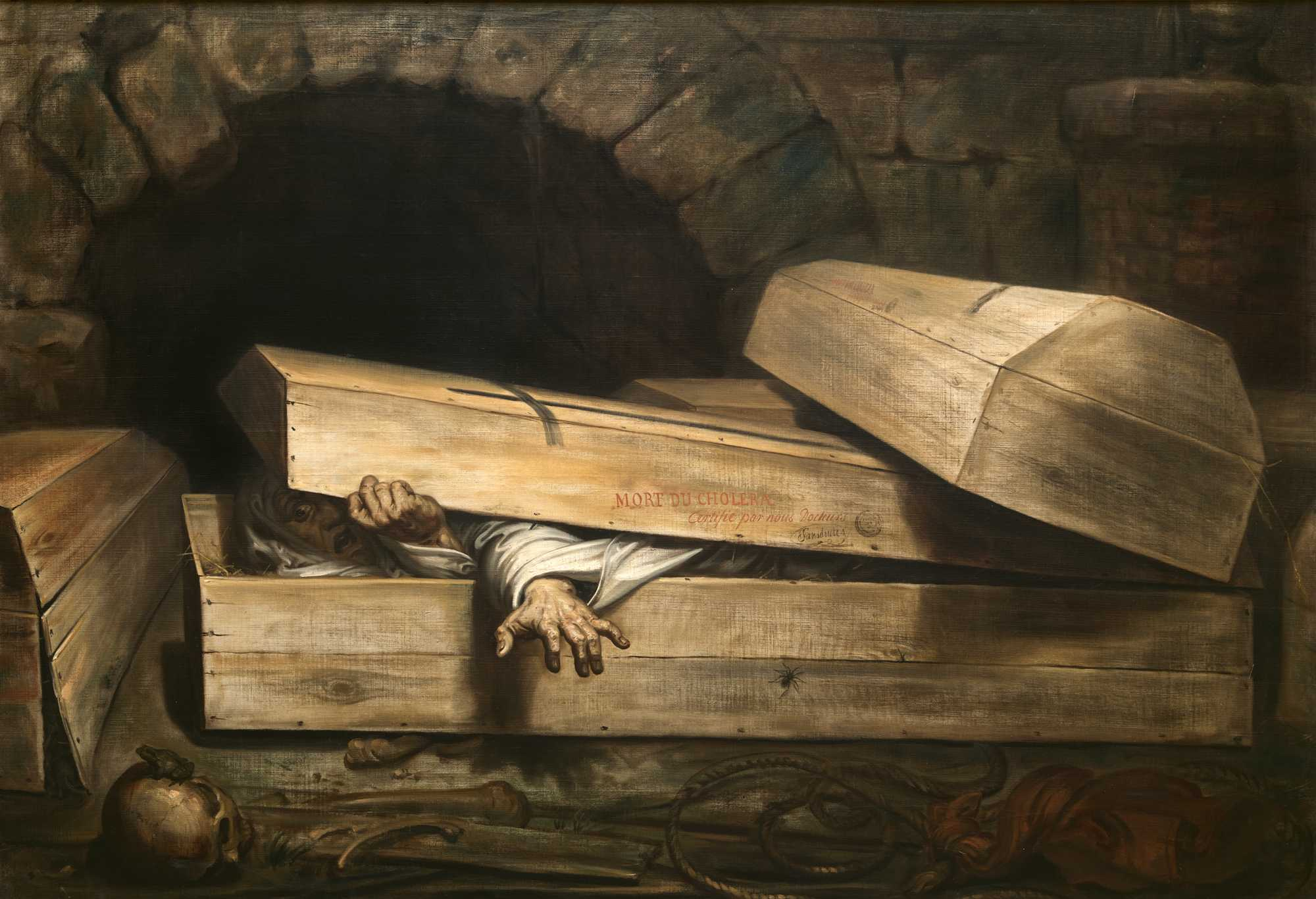
The Premature Burial, 1854

Paul de Maibe, member of the Lower House of the States General for the Province of Namur and owner of ironworks in Wiertz's native town Dinant, noticed the young Wiertz's talent for the plastic arts, took him under his wing. He helped him secure a place at the Antwerp art academy in 1820, when he was only 14 years old.

Thanks to his protector, de Maibe, king William I of the Netherlands awarded him an annual stipend from 1821 onwards. Wiertz's artistic mentors at the academy, Mattheus Ignatius van Bree (1773–1839) and Willem Jacob Herreyns (1743–1827), further stimulated his love for Flemish painting and particularly for the work of Peter Paul Rubens. Herreyns was, in fact, the last follower of Rubens in the 18th century, when interest in the painter had been superseded by neoclassicism. From that moment on, the oeuvre of Rubens would remain for Wiertz a shining example to be emulated.

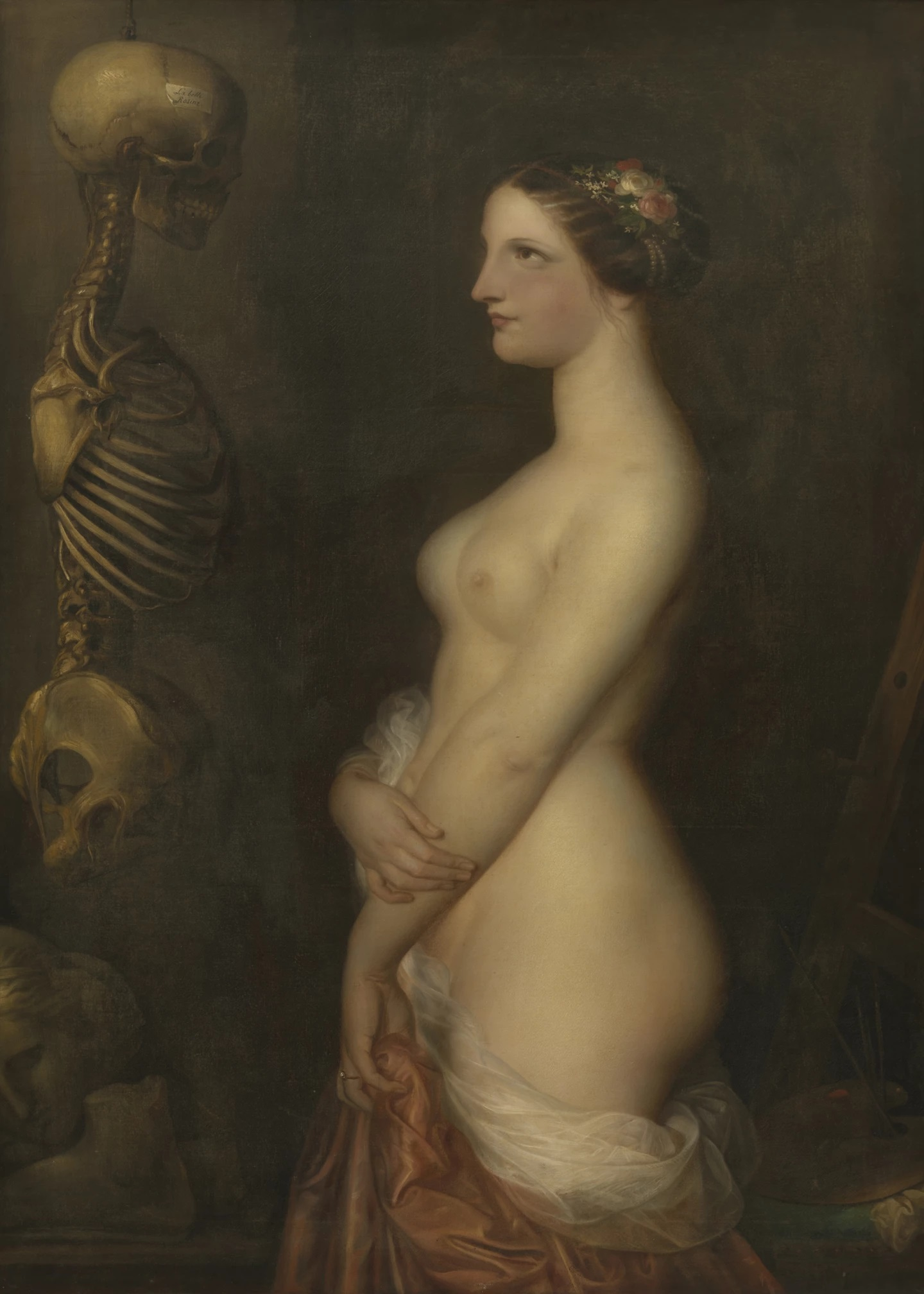
Two Young Girls (also known as The Beautiful Rosine), Oil on canvas, 1847

In 1828, Wiertz was awarded second prize in the competition for the prestigious Prix de Rome of the United Kingdom of the Netherlands. Between November 1829 and May 1832, he stayed in Paris, where he made a living painting portraits. He studied the old masters at the Louvre where he admired Rubens' works but turned his nose up at contemporary French masters such as David, Géricault and Girodet, all three of whom had died a few years earlier.

After the independence of Belgium he won the inaugural Prix de Rome of Belgium) in 1832. The 10.000 frank prize enabled him to travel to Rome to further his studies. He joined the French Academy at Rome in Rome, where he resided from May 1834 until February 1837. Upon his return, he established himself in Liège with his mother.

During his stay in Rome, Wiertz worked on his first great work, "Greeks and Trojans fighting for the body of Patroclus" (finished in 1836), on a subject borrowed from book XVII of Homer's Iliad. It was admired during his stay in Rome and exhibited in Antwerp in 1837, where it met with some success. Wiertz submitted the work for the Paris Salon of 1838, but it arrived too late and was refused.

== Mature works ==
At the Paris Salon of 1839, Wiertz showed not only his Patrocles, but also three other works: Madame Laetitia Bonaparte on her deathbed, The fable of the three wishes — Man's insatiability and Christ entombed. Badly hung and lit, his entry elicited indifference on the part of the public, and provoked sarcasm among the critics. Charles Baudelaire described Wiertz as '...that infamous poseur, […] a charlatan, idiot, thief […] who does not know how to draw and whose stupidity is as massive as his giants'. Baudelaire's criticism would set the tone for Wiertz's reception in the twentieth century.

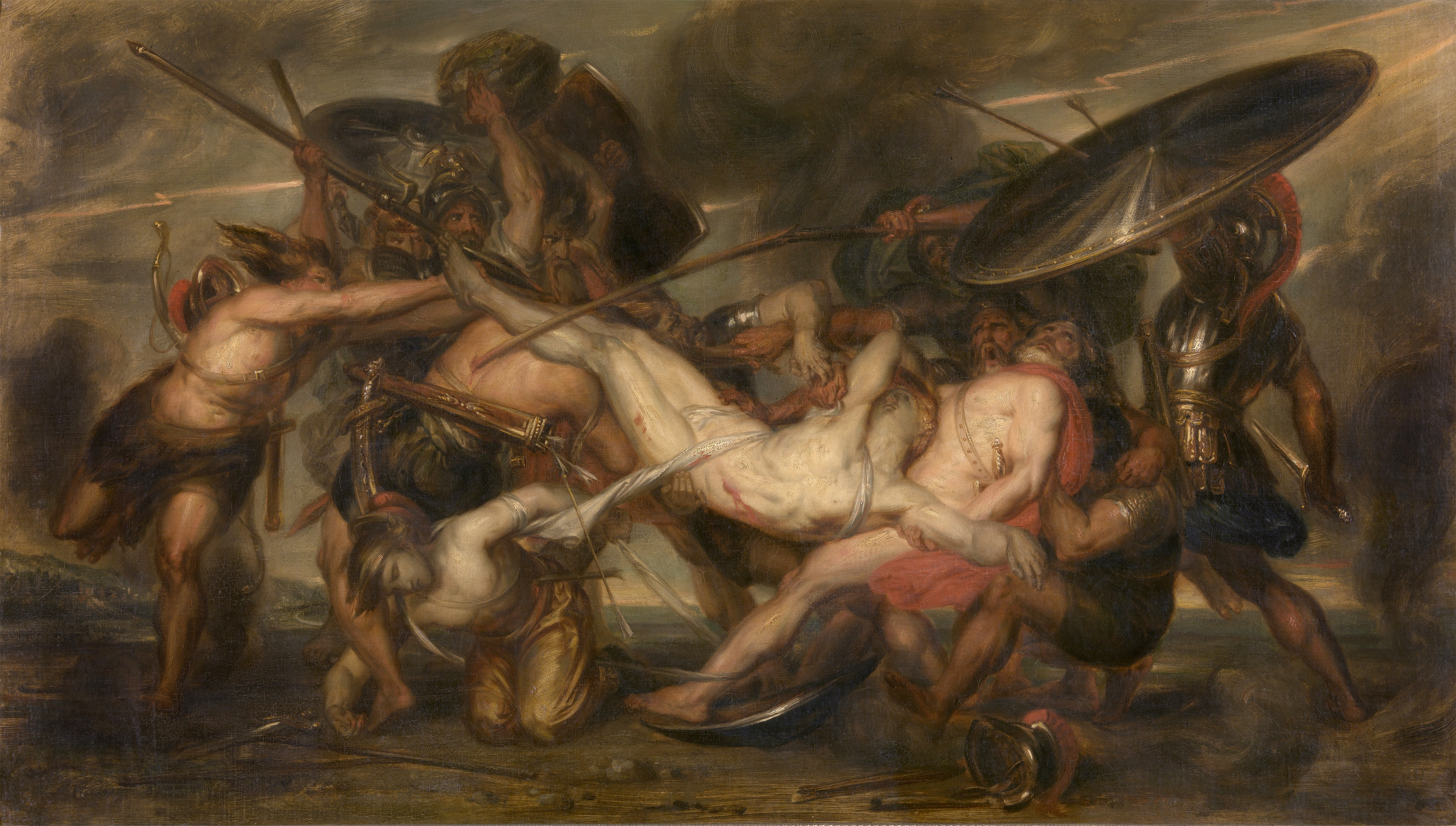
The Greeks and the Trojans Fighting over the Body of Patroclus

His humiliation at the Paris salon of 1839 led to a profound rancour against art critics and against Paris, as expressed in his virulent pamphlet Bruxelles capitale, Paris province. In 1844, Wiertz painted a second version of his Patrocles on an even bigger scale than the first (the 1836 version measures 3.85 by 7.03 meters, the 1844 version 5.20 by 8.52 meter). The 1836 version is now in the Museum of Walloon Art in Liège, the 1844 in the Wiertz Museum in Brussels.

After the Paris disaster, Wiertz veered increasingly towards the excessive. A fine example is the monumental The Fall of the rebellious Angels, 1841, painted on an arched canvas of 11.53 by 7.93 meter. He received national recognition in his home country and was made Knight of the Order of Leopold.

The death of his mother in 1844 was a terrible blow to the artist. He left Liège in 1845 to settle in Brussels for good. During this period he painted a confrontation of Beauty and Death, Two young girls (The beautiful Rosine) (1847), which remains perhaps his most famous work.

Dissatisfied with the shiny effect of oil painting in particular in large canvases, he developed a new technique combining the smoothness of oil painting with the speed of execution and the dullness of painting in fresco. This technique of mat painting entailed the use of a mixture of colours, turpentine and petrol on holland. The Homeric battle (1853) was the first big-scale painting executed in this technique. However, the components used in this technique are responsible for the slow decay of the works produced with it and have impacted on the critical reception of the artist's work. The use of the chemicals may also have contributed to the artist's early death after suffering from ill health for a long time.

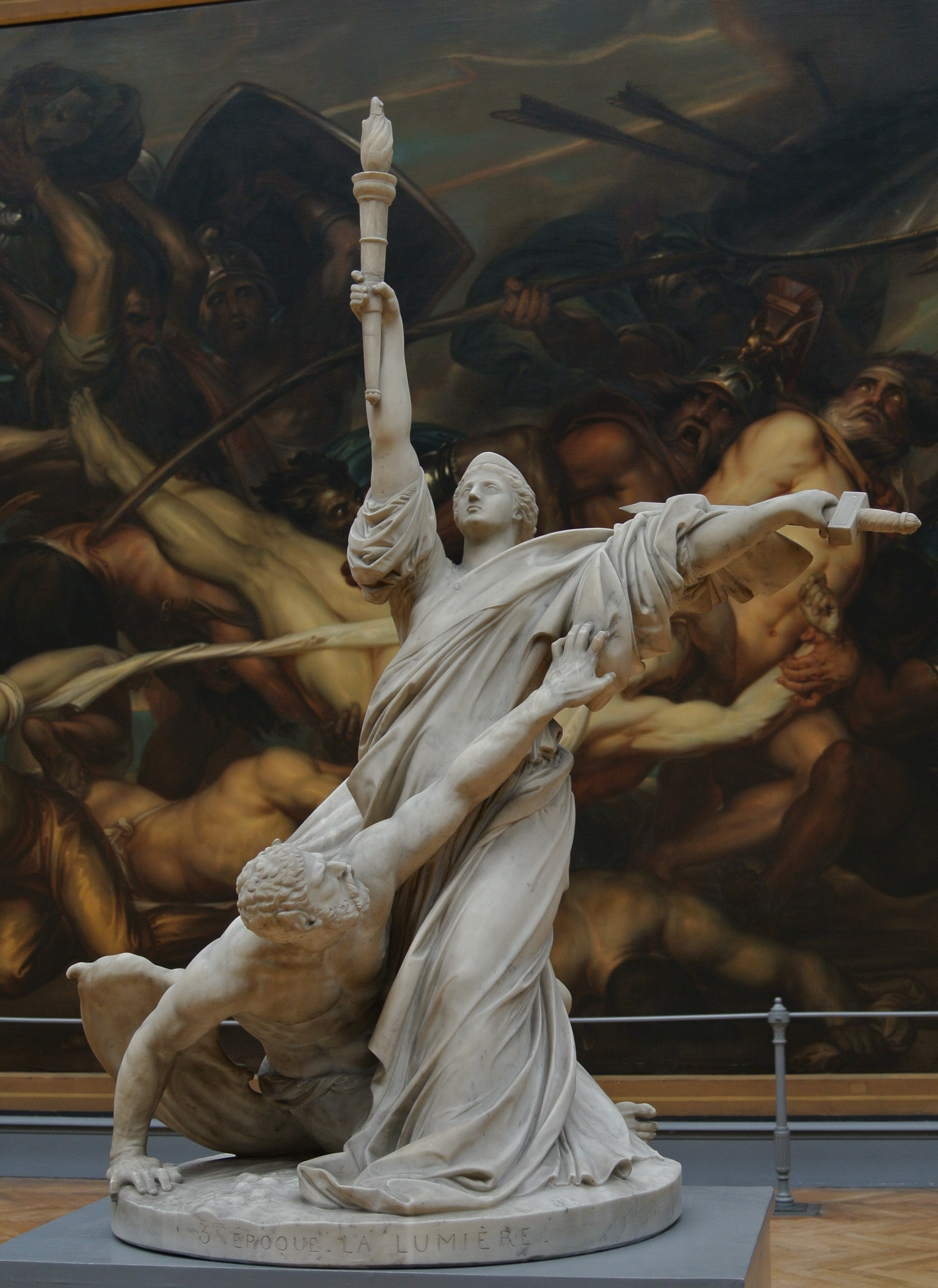
The Triumph of Light

Many of his works from the 1850s have a social or philosophical message, often translated in delirious imagery, like Hunger, Madness and Crime (1853), The Reader of Novels (1853), Suicide (1854), The premature burial (1854) and The last gun (1855).

Wiertz was also a fine portrait painter, who made self-portraits at various ages. As a sculptor, he produced his most important project towards the end of his life: a series of plasters representing The Four Ages of Man (1860–1862), reproduced in marble for the Wiertz museum by Auguste Franck.

Influenced mainly by Rubens and the late Michelangelo, Wiertz' monumental painting often moves between classical academism and lurid romanticism, between the grandiose and the ridiculous. Although his work was often derided as art pompier (firefighter art), his pictorial language nevertheless presage Symbolism and a certain kind of Surrealism, two currents that would play an important role in Belgian painting.

== Later life ==
After difficult negotiations with the Belgian government, Wiertz was able to realize his dream to turn his last studio into a museum for his works. The Belgian state bought a piece of land and funded the construction of a huge hall to accommodate the painter's monumental works. In exchange, Wiertz donated all his works to the Belgian state, with the express proviso that they should remain in his studio both during and after his lifetime.

Wiertz died in his studio. His remains were embalmed in accordance with Ancient Egyptian burial rites and buried in a vault in the municipal cemetery of Ixelles.

A copy of one of Antoine Wiertz's works, the statue of The Triumph of Light was once prominently located high on San Francisco's Mount Olympus between the Haight-Ashbury and Corona Heights. It had been presented to the city of San Francisco by Adolph Sutro in 1887. Over the years due to lack of care and maintenance the statue fell into disrepair. By the late 1930s, even the history and origins of the statue were no longer common knowledge in San Francisco, and by the mid-1950s, the statue disappeared. All that remains today is the pedestal and base of the monument.

== Gallery ==
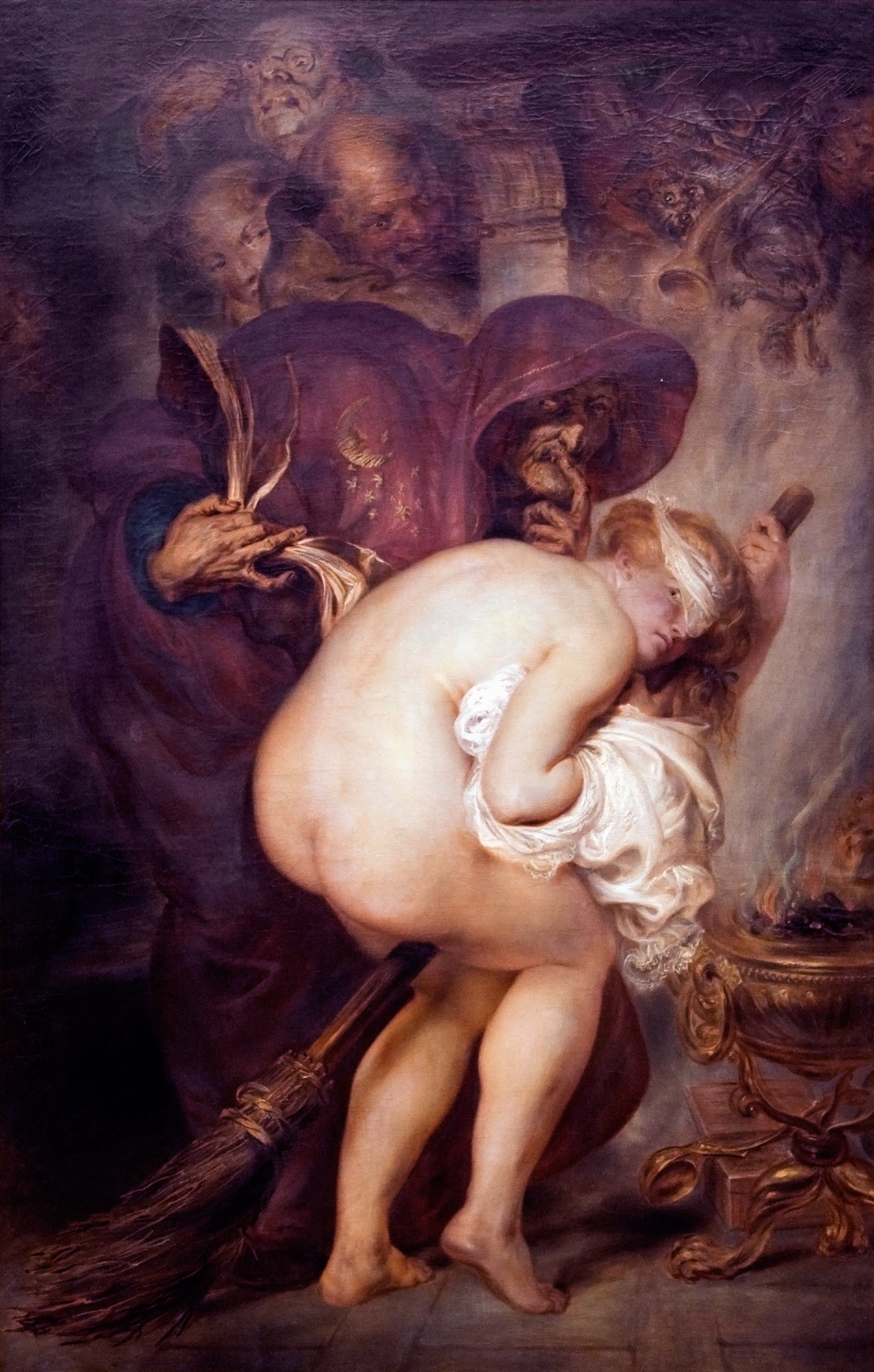
The Young Sorceress

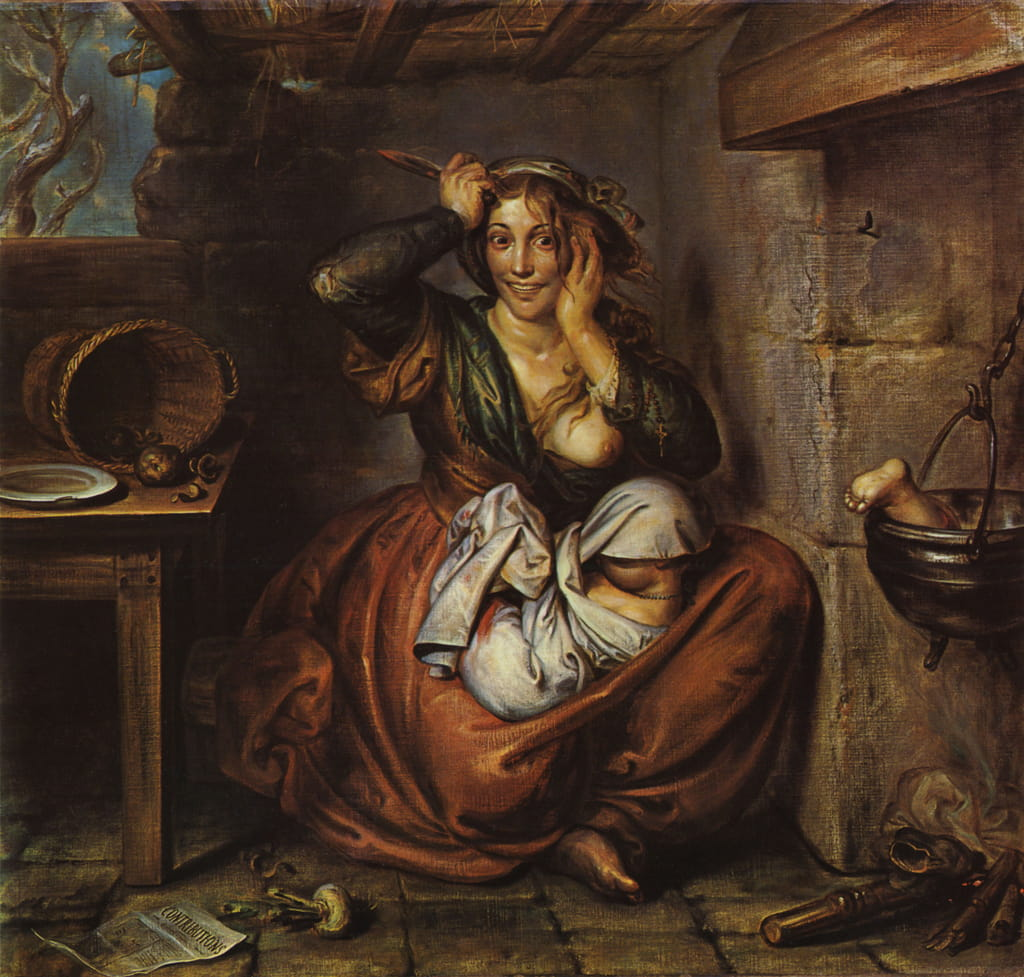
Hunger, Madness, Crime, 1853

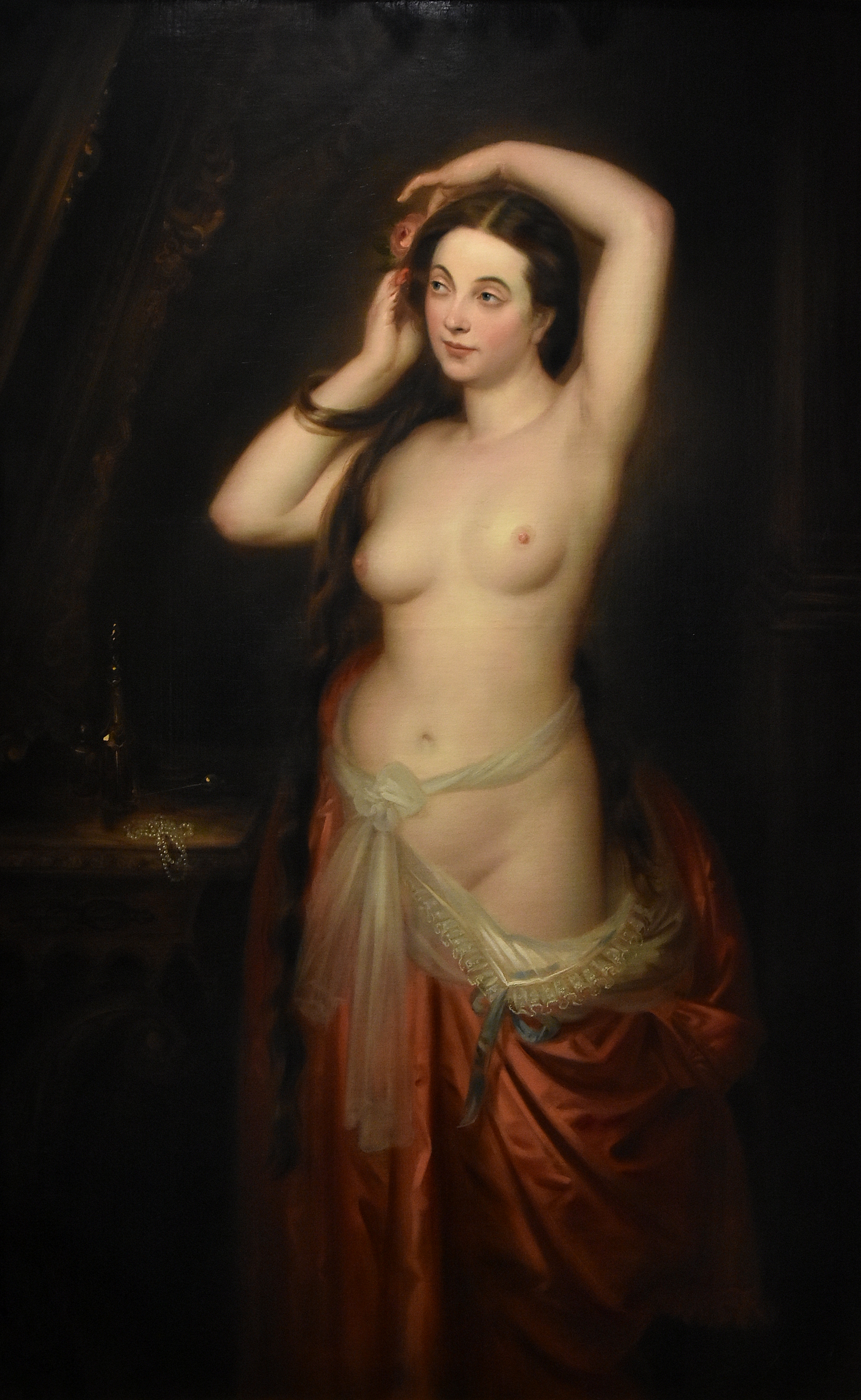
Rosine à sa toilette

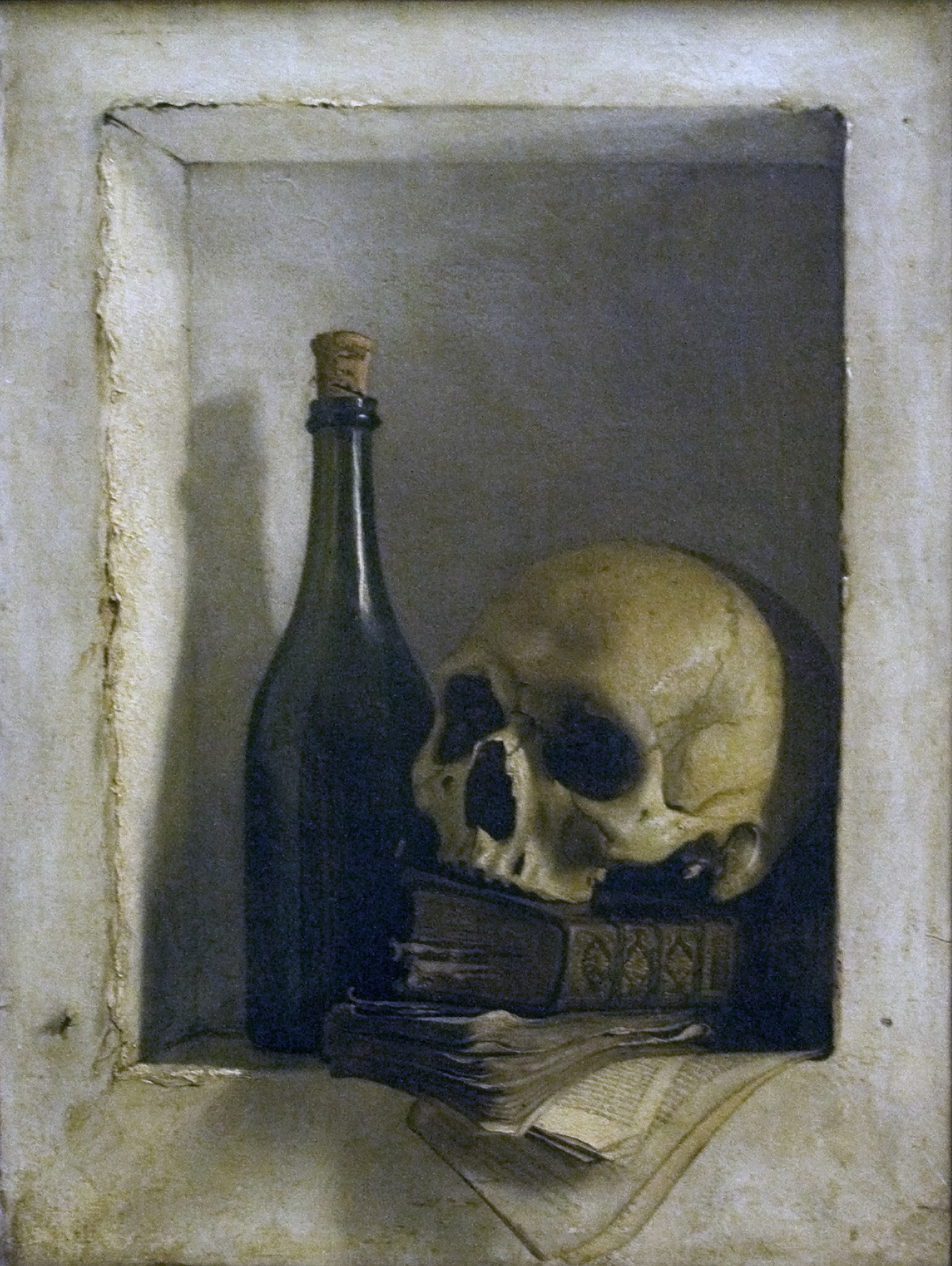
Allegory with Skull

== Wiertz Museum ==
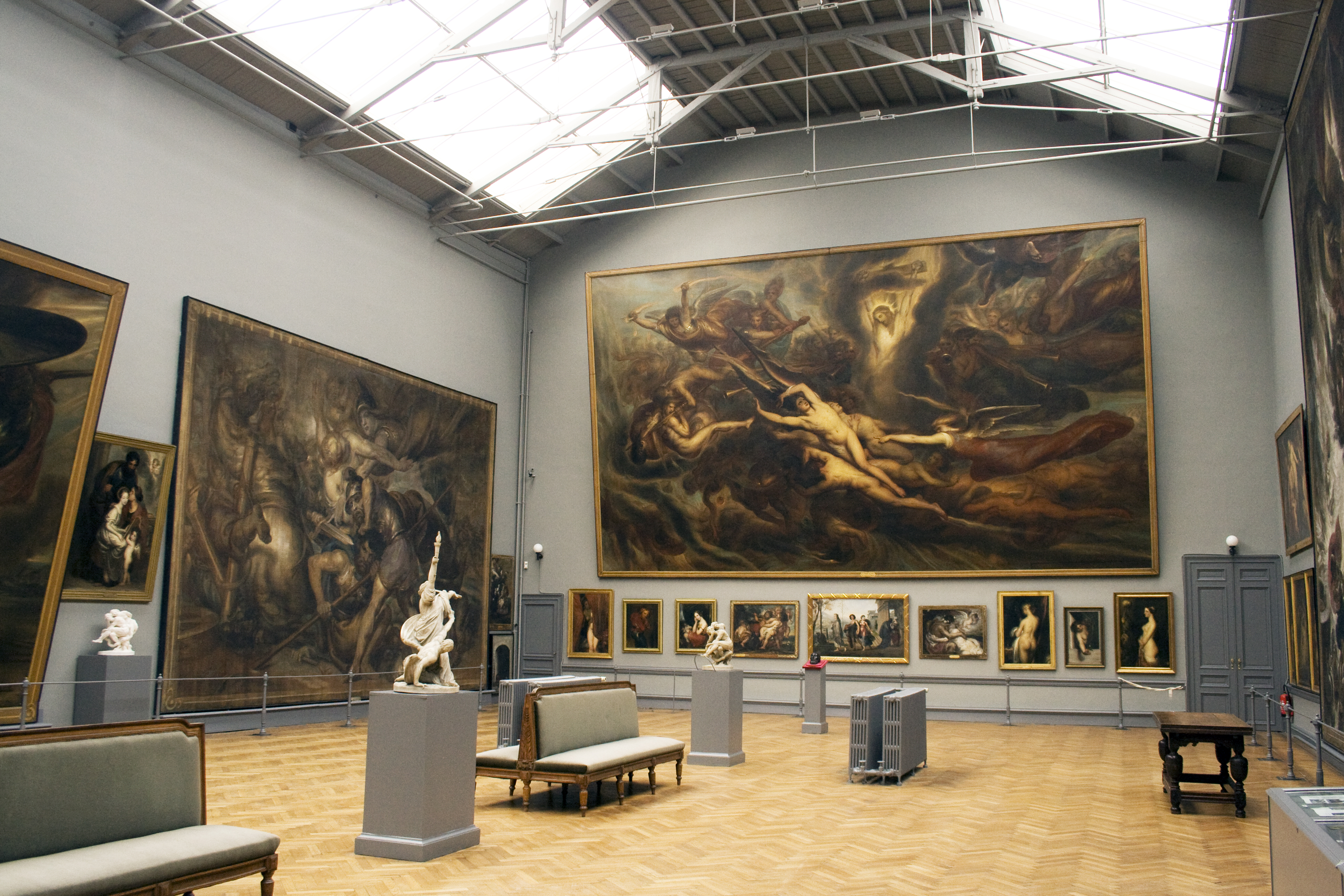
Main hall of the Wiertz Museum, Brussels

The Wiertz Museum is now one of the Royal Museums of Fine Arts of Belgium. It is located at 62, rue Vautier/Vautierstraat in Ixelles, in the heart of the Leopold Quarter, near Brussels-Luxembourg railway station. The Rue Wiertz runs from the museum through the European Parliament complex, in an unintended echo of Wiertz' call for Brussels to become the capital of Europe.
