= Hugo Puttaert =

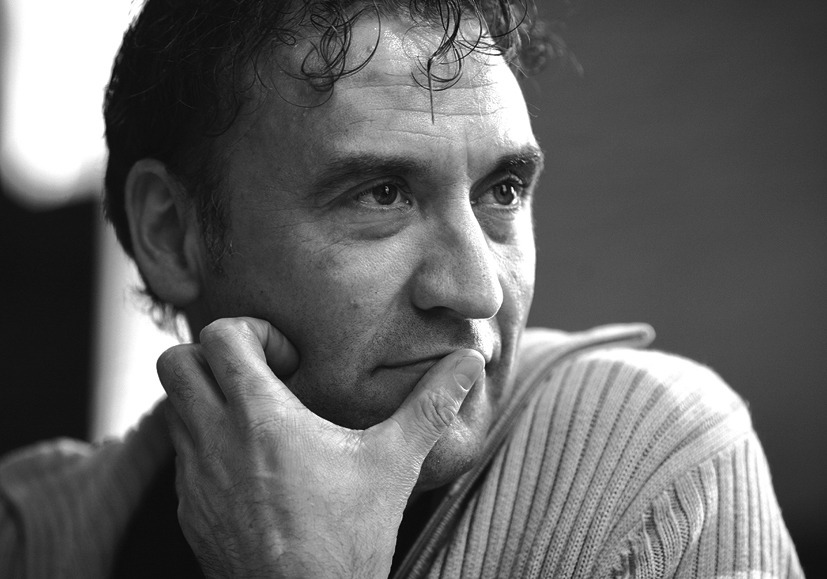
Hugo Puttaert

Hugo Puttaert (Brussels, 3 April 1960) is a graphic designer, organizer, teacher and editor based in the greater Brussels area, Belgium.

== Biography ==
=== Studies and early career ===
Puttaert studied fine arts (printmaking) at Sint-Lukas Brussel and did his teacher training at Sint-Lucas Gent. Soon after graduating in 1981 he began teaching at the Fine Arts Academy in Halle.

During his studies already and in the early 1980s after his graduation, he exhibited his graphic work, his artwork and installations in various cultural centres and galleries in Belgium and abroad. In time he combined traditional graphic techniques with digital technologies and began making more applied graphic work (posters, brochures and house styles). Thanks to his work for IT company Dolmen he was able to experience the emergence of desktop publishing in Belgium from a privileged position. His attention to free and applied graphic design continued to the end of the 1980s, when he chose to focus on graphic design.

=== Design studio ===
Puttaert set up his own graphic design studio Visionandfactory in 1990, its staff reaching up to 12 people. Hugo Puttaert and visionandfactory have worked as designers and consultants for a wide range of businesses and cultural organisations.

Work by Hugo Puttaert and Visionandfactory has been published in design magazines and yearbooks including Package & Design (China), Print European Design Annual (USA), Emigre magazine (USA), Novum, world of graphic design (Germany), Graphis Yearbooks (Switzerland, USA) and Graphics International (London, UK) and many more. Their work received several nominations at Belgium's Henry van de Velde design prize, and was shortlisted in the New York Art Director's Club's annual competition (V&F corporate identity).

=== Additional functions ===
He teaches at St Lucas University College of Art and Design in Antwerp, the art and design department of the Karel de Grote-Hogeschool, where he was from 2012 till 2018 head of the Graphic Design department and coordinated the YellowPress publication research platform. He regularly appears as a guest lecturer in Belgium and abroad.

He was moreover (till 2019)the organizer of the bi-annual international conference Integrated, of which the first edition took place in November 2007 at the international art campus deSingel in Antwerp, Belgium.

He is also a publisher and editor. He has written various texts on graphic design and related subjects. Since 2005, he has been the editor-in-chief and creative director of Addmagazine.be, a Belgian magazine that focuses on graphic design from Belgium and elsewhere, and published by Papyrus.

In 2024, he founded Not.Yet Publishers, an independent, non-profit publishing house that aims to deepen the canon of graphic design by publishing books on graphic design, practice-based research in art and design courses, and hybrid collaborations in which the graphic designer acts as initiator and curator.

== Think in Colour ==
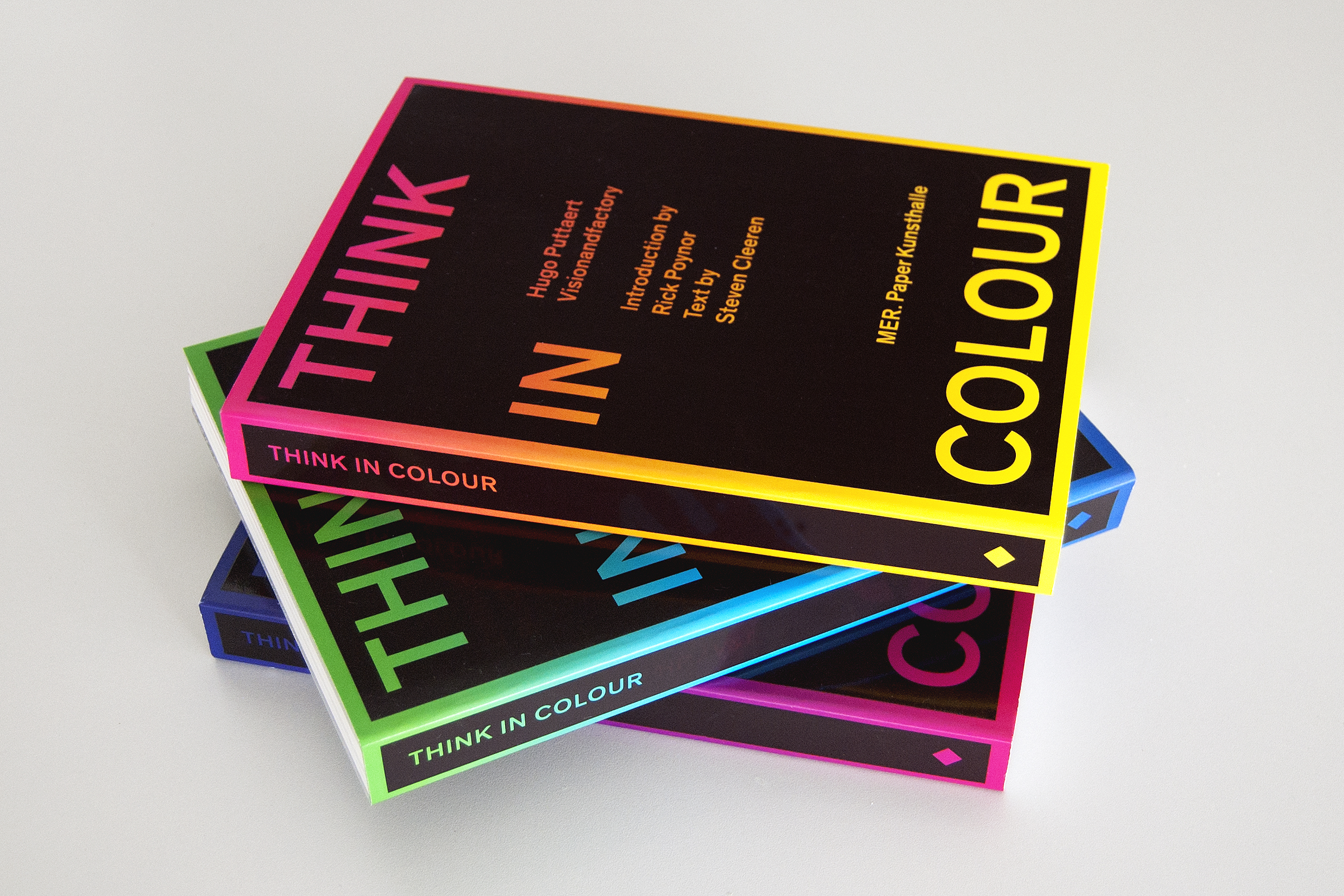
Think in Colour

In 2014 Publisher MER Paper Kunsthalle published a book on his work, Think in Colour. the introduction was written by publicist and critic Rick Poynor. An accompanying website provides more detailed information on the purpose of the book and its creation. The book has a technical specificity: heating the cover will reveal the underlying colour and text.

== Geometrically Speaking ==
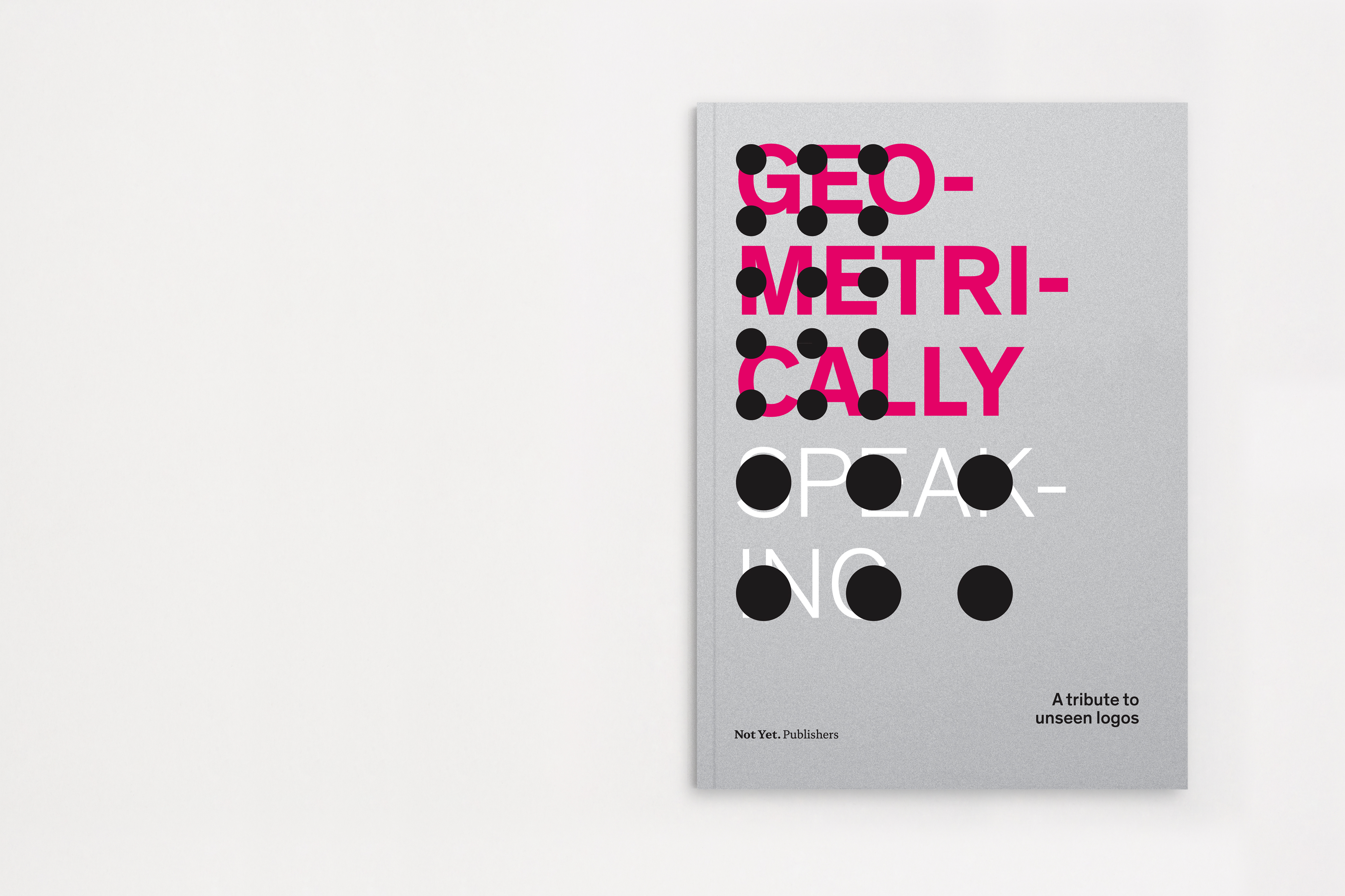
Geometrically Speaking

Not Yet. Publishers published the book Geometrically Speaking in 2014. The book showcases nearly a thousand logo designs by Hugo Puttaert and his studio visionandfactory, spanning 30 years. The foreword was written by Thomas Crombez. Puttaert wrote the critical essay The beneficial effect of ‘no’.

== Work in public space ==
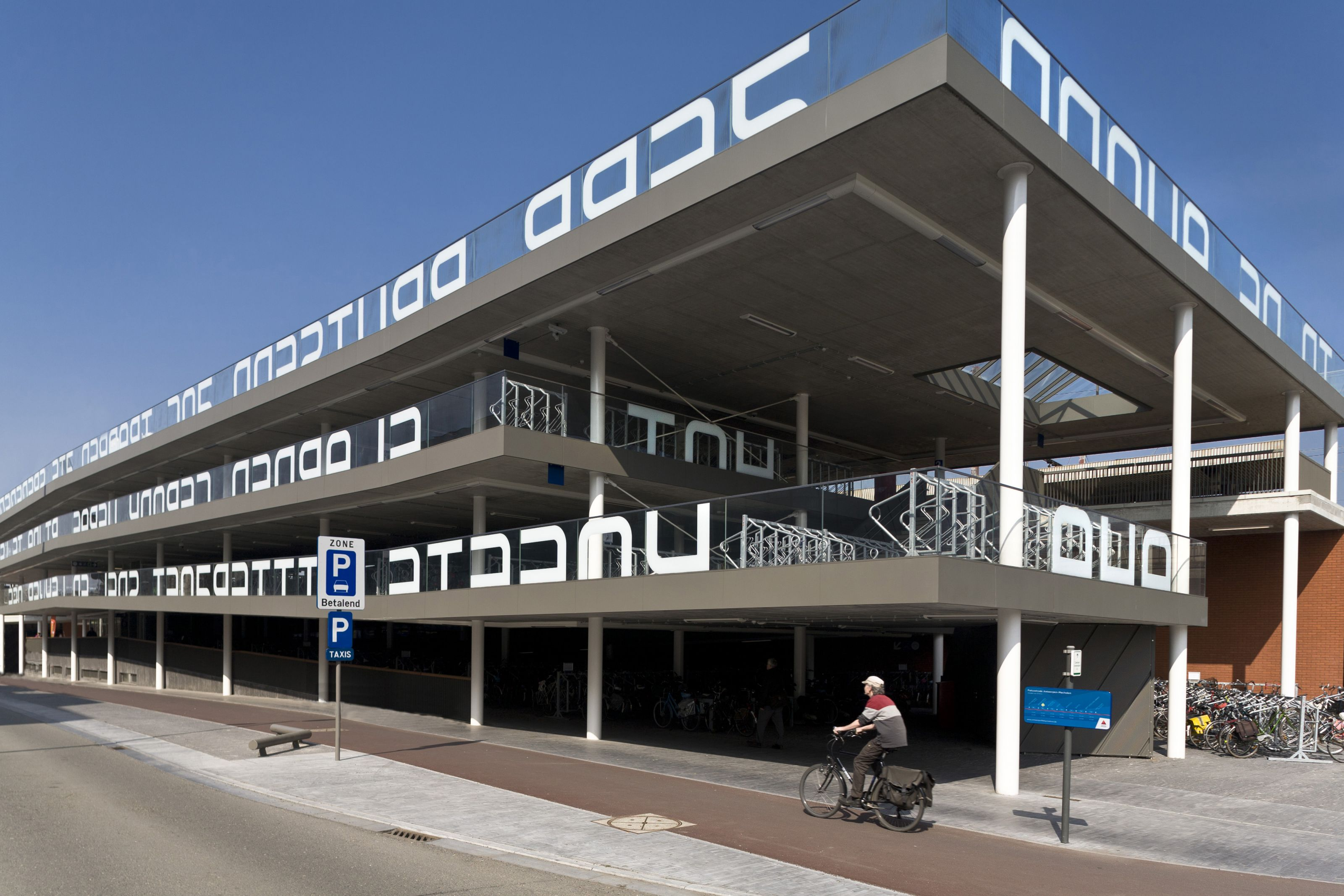
Berchem Folded Sans

In 2015, a new bicycle shed was inaugurated at Antwerp-Berchem station. Commissioned by NMBS and in collaboration with designer Jelle Maréchal, Puttaert realised a typographic intervention in the building. The concept of this intervention subtly plays with the user's experience of the bicycle parking building. Only inside the building are the letters legible, as the lower part of each letter is painted on the floor of the building. Outside, passers-by and drivers see only abstract signs. For this commission, Hugo Puttaert and Jelle Maréchal designed a monospace font, Berchem Folded Sans.
