= Heysel Stadium disaster =

Fatal spectator riot in Brussels, Belgium in 1985

- Photograph of Section X during the disaster.
- Date: 29 May 1985; 41 years ago
- Venue: Heysel Stadium
- Location: Brussels, Belgium; 50°53′45″N 4°20′3″E
- Cause: Football hooliganism; dilapidated stadium; negligent administration; poor policing
- Filmed by: European Broadcasting Union
- Participants: Supporters of Liverpool and Juventus
- Outcome: English clubs banned from European competition for five years; Liverpool for six years
- Deaths: 39
- Injuries: 600
- Arrests: 34
- Convicted: Police captain Johan Mahieu, and 14 Liverpool fans convicted of manslaughter

The Heysel Stadium disaster was a crowd disaster that occurred on 29 May 1985 when Juventus fans were escaping from an attack by Liverpool fans while they were pressed against a wall in the Heysel Stadium in Brussels, Belgium, before the start of the 1985 European Cup final. The stadium was in need of maintenance and had not been adequately updated. It had failed inspections prior to the disaster, and the wall collapsed under the force. 39 spectators—mostly Italians and Juventus fans—were killed in the subsequent crush, while 600 more were injured.

Approximately an hour before the Juventus-Liverpool final was due to kick off, incidents of aggression between the two sets of supporters were taking place across the flimsy divide between the Liverpool section and what was intended to have been the "neutral" section, populated by those who had purchased tickets in Belgium. The throwing of objects back and forth led to larger scale physical altercations, and the chicken wire fence was soon ripped down. After initial fighting, the (largely Juventus) fans in the neutral section began to run away from the Liverpool fans who had become involved, initially towards the pitch (where Belgian police would not allow them to go) and the exit (where they were not permitted to leave), and then in the direction of the decrepit wall. Fans already standing near the wall were crushed; eventually the wall collapsed, providing an escape route for some while contributing to the fatalities. Many people climbed over to safety, but many others died or were badly injured. The game was played despite the pre-match incidents by authorities and organisers' joint decision for public policy doctrine reasons after a state of siege was declared in the city, with Juventus winning 1–0.

The tragedy resulted in all English football clubs being placed under an indefinite ban by Union of European Football Associations (UEFA) from all European competitions (lifted in 1990–91), with Liverpool being excluded for an additional three years, later reduced to one, and 14 Liverpool fans were found guilty of manslaughter and sentenced to six years' imprisonment, with the Belgian authorities also being blamed, including police captain Johan Mahieu, who had been in charge of security, found guilty of manslaughter. The disaster was later described as "the darkest hour in the history of the UEFA competitions".

== Background ==
In May 1985, Liverpool were the defending European Champions' Cup winners, having won the competition after defeating Roma on penalties in the previous season's final. Again, they would face Italian opposition, Juventus, which had won unbeaten the 1983–84 Cup Winners' Cup. Juventus had a team of many of Italy's 1982 World Cup winning team, which played for Juventus for many years, and its playmaker, Michel Platini, was considered the best footballer in Europe and was named Footballer of The Year by the magazine France Football for the second year in a row in December 1984. Both teams were placed in the two first positions in the UEFA club ranking at the end of the previous season and were regarded by the specialist press as the two best teams on the continent. Both teams had contested the 1984 European Super Cup four months earlier, with a 2–0 victory for the Italian team.

Despite its status as Belgium's national stadium, Heysel Stadium was in a poor state of repair by the 1985 European Cup final. The 55-year-old stadium had not been sufficiently maintained for several years, and large parts of the facility were literally crumbling. For example, the outer wall had been made of cinder block, and Liverpool fans who did not have tickets were seen kicking holes in the wall to get in. In some areas of the stadium, there was only one turnstile, and some fans attending the game claimed that they were never searched or asked for their tickets.

Liverpool players and fans reportedly expressed surprise at the stadium's condition, despite reports from Arsenal fans that the ground was a "dump" when Arsenal had played there a few years earlier. They were also surprised that Heysel was chosen despite its poor condition, especially since Barcelona's Camp Nou and Madrid's Santiago Bernabéu were both available. Juventus President Giampiero Boniperti and Liverpool CEO Peter Robinson urged the Union of European Football Associations (UEFA) to choose another venue and claimed that Heysel was not in any condition to host a European Cup final, especially one involving two prominent European clubs. However, UEFA refused to consider a move. It was later discovered that UEFA's inspection of the stadium had lasted just thirty minutes.

The stadium was crammed with 58,000 to 60,000 supporters, with more than 25,000 for each team. The two ends behind the goals comprised all-standing terraces, each end split into three zones. The Juventus end was O, N, and M, and the Liverpool end was X, Y, and Z, as deemed by the Belgian court after the disaster. However, the tickets for the Z section were reserved for neutral Belgian fans in addition to the rest of the stadium. The idea of the large neutral area was opposed by both Liverpool and Juventus, as it would provide an opportunity for fans of both clubs to obtain tickets from agencies or from ticket touts outside the ground and thereby create a dangerous mix of fans.

At the time, Belgium already had a large Italian community; many expatriate Juventus fans from Brussels, Liège and Charleroi bought Section Z tickets. Also, many tickets were bought up and sold by travel agents, mainly to Juventus fans. That meant the Juventus fans had more sections than the Liverpool fans with the Z section, which was nominally reserved for neutrals. Reportedly, Liverpool fans were still smarting from being attacked by Roma ultras at the 1984 European Cup final and placed next to what amounted to another Juventus section heightened tensions before the match. A small percentage of the tickets ended up in the hands of Liverpool fans.

== Confrontation ==
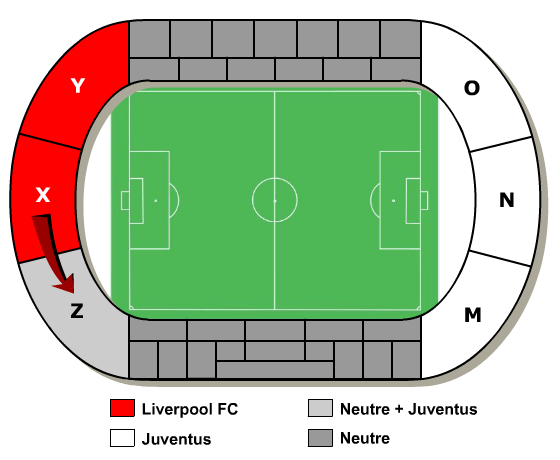
Heysel Stadium by section

At approximately 7:00 p.m. local time, an hour before kickoff, the initial disturbance started. The Liverpool and Sections X and the mixed, but largely Juventus, supporters in Section Z (a supposedly neutral section for which tickets had been sold locally in Belgium) stood merely metres apart. The boundary between the two was marked by temporary chain link fencing and a central thinly-policed no man's land. Hooligans began to throw flares, bottles and stones across the divide and picked up stones from the crumbling terraces beneath them.

As kickoff approached, the exchange of objects increased. Eventually angry Liverpool fans charged towards the Juventus fans, the boundary between Section X and Z broke down, and the few police officers stationed at the divide were overpowered. The largely Juventus fans started fleeing, initially towards the pitch (but the Belgian police would not allow them to go there) and the exit (where the officials would not open the gate to allow them to leave) and then towards the decrepit concrete wall at the perimeter of Section Z. Fans standing near the wall were crushed, and as the pressure mounted the entire lower portion of the wall collapsed, burying fans underneath it as it fell. Some fans managed to climb over to safety, but many others died or were badly injured.

In retaliation for the events in Section Z, many Juventus fans advanced down the stadium running track to help other Juventus supporters, but police intervention stopped the advance. A large group of Juventus fans fought the police with rocks, bottles and stones for two hours. One Juventus fan was also seen firing a starting gun at Belgian police.

== Match ==
It was decided that the match should eventually start for public policy doctrine reasons because abandoning the match would have risked inciting further disturbances. This decision was jointly made by UEFA officials, the Italian, English and Belgian national associations, the country's Ministry of Interior led by local Premier Wilfried Martens, Brussels Mayor Hervé Brouhon, and the city's police force, despite the scale of the disaster, the state of siege in the City of Brussels consequently declared by the Belgian government and Juventus expressed concerns about the match proceeding. After the captains of both sides spoke to the crowd and appealed for calm, the players took the field knowing that people had died. Years later, Liverpool captain Phil Neal said that in hindsight, it would have been "a better decision" to call off the game.

Juventus won the match 1–0 thanks to a penalty scored by Platini, which was awarded by the Swiss referee, Daina, for a foul against Zbigniew Boniek.

At the end of the game, the trophy was given in front of the stadium's Honor Stand by UEFA President Jacques Georges to Juventus Captain Gaetano Scirea. The chants of fans of both teams in the stands and the massive invasion of the pitch by journalists and fans at the end of the match generated the collective hysteria. Some of the Italian club players celebrated the title in the middle of the pitch in front of their fans in the M section, and some of the Liverpool players applauded their fans between the X and Z sections.

Liverpool players only realised the extent of the tragedy when they boarded their bus at a Brussels hotel to go to the airport, when a crowd of Juventus supporters surrounded the bus. Police had to escort the bus out of the lot. The police allowed Liverpool's bus to drive directly onto the tarmac at Brussels Airport to prevent potential disturbances at the terminal.

== Victims ==
Of the 39 people killed, 32 were Italian (including two minors), four Belgian, two French, and one from Northern Ireland.

- (Italy) Rocco Acerra, 29
- (Italy) Bruno Balli, 50
- (Belgium) Alfons Bos, 35
- (Italy) Giancarlo Bruschera, 21
- (Italy) Andrea Casula, 11
- (Italy) Giovanni Casula, 44
- (Italy) Nino Cerullo, 24
- (Belgium) Willy Chielens, 41
- (Italy) Giuseppina Conti, 17
- (Belgium) Dirk Daeninckx, 38
- (Italy) Dionisio Fabbro, 51
- (France) Jacques François, 45
- (Italy) Eugenio Gagliano, 35
- (Italy) Francesco Galli, 24
- (Italy) Giancarlo Gonnelli, 20
- (Italy) Alberto Guarini, 21
- (Italy) Giovacchino Landini, 50
- (Italy) Roberto Lorentini, 31
- (Italy) Barbara Lusci, 58
- (Italy) Franco Martelli, 22
- (Italy) Loris Messore, 28
- (Italy) Gianni Mastroiaco, 20
- (Italy) Sergio Bastino Mazzino, 38
- (Italy) Luciano Rocco Papaluca, 38
- (Italy) Luigi Pidone, 31
- (Italy) Benito Pistolato, 50
- (Northern Ireland) Patrick Radcliffe, 38
- (Italy) Domenico Ragazzi, 44
- (Italy) Antonio Ragnanese, 49
- (France) Claude Robert, 27
- (Italy) Mario Ronchi, 43
- (Italy) Domenico Russo, 28
- (Italy) Tarcisio Salvi, 49
- (Italy) Gianfranco Sarto, 47
- (Italy) Amedeo Giuseppe Spolaore, 55
- (Italy) Mario Spanu, 41
- (Italy) Tarcisio Venturin, 23
- (Belgium) Jean Michel Walla, 32
- (Italy) Claudio Zavaroni, 28

== Investigation ==
The investigation focused initially on the actions of Liverpool fans. On 30 May, official UEFA observer Gunter Schneider said, "Only the English fans were responsible. Of that there is no doubt." UEFA, the organiser of the event, the owners of Heysel Stadium and the Belgian police were investigated for culpability. After an eighteen-month investigation, the dossier of leading Belgian judge Marina Coppieters was finally published. The investigation concluded that blame should not rest solely with the fans, and some culpability lay also with the police and authorities. Several top officials were incriminated by her findings, including police captain Johan Mahieu, who had been in charge of security. He was subsequently charged with involuntary manslaughter. According to Bill Sergeant, then detective chief inspector of Merseyside Police who was in the Liverpool section with his son and led the investigation into who was involved: "In my opinion, the tragedy resulted from a drink-fuelled aggressive response by Liverpool 'fans' to what they felt was unacceptable behaviour by Juventus supporters. They did not believe the Belgian police were protecting them."

=== Effect on stadiums ===
After Heysel, English clubs began to impose stricter rules intended to make it easier to prevent troublemakers from attending domestic games, with legal provision to exclude troublemakers for three months introduced in 1986, and the Football Spectators Act 1989 introduced in 1991.

Serious progress on legal banning orders preventing foreign travel to matches was arguably not made until the violence involving England fans (allegedly mainly involving neo-Nazi groups, such as Combat 18) at a match against Ireland on 15 February 1995 and violent scenes at the 1998 FIFA World Cup. Rioting at UEFA Euro 2000 saw the introduction of new legislation and wider use of police powers—by 2004, 2,000 banning orders were in place, compared to fewer than 100 before Euro 2000.

The main reforms to English stadiums came after the Taylor Report into the Hillsborough disaster in April 1989, which ultimately resulted in the death of 97 Liverpool fans. All-seater stadiums became a requirement for clubs in the top two divisions while pitch-side fencing was removed and closed-circuit cameras became widespread. Fans who misbehave can have their tickets revoked and be legally barred from attending games at any English stadium.

The Heysel Stadium itself continued to be used for some matches of the Belgium national team until 1990, when UEFA banned Belgium from hosting a European final for a minimum of 10 years. In 1994, the stadium was almost completely rebuilt as the King Baudouin Stadium. On 28 August 1995 the new stadium welcomed the return of football to Heysel in the form of a friendly match between Belgium and Germany. It then hosted a major European final again on 8 May 1996 when Paris Saint-Germain defeated Rapid Vienna 1–0 to win the Cup Winners' Cup.

== Litigation ==
British police undertook a thorough investigation to bring the perpetrators to justice. Some seventeen minutes of film and many still photographs were examined. TV Eye produced an hour-long programme featuring the footage while British newspapers published the photographs.

A total of 34 people were arrested and questioned with 26 Liverpool fans being charged with manslaughter—the only extraditable offence applicable to events at Heysel. An extradition hearing in London in February–March 1987 ruled all 26 were to be extradited to stand trial in Belgium for the death of Juventus fan Mario Ronchi. In September 1987 they were extradited and formally charged with manslaughter applying to all 39 deaths and further charges of assault. Initially, all were held at a Belgian prison, but, over the subsequent months, judges permitted their release as the start of the trial was further delayed.

The trial eventually began in October 1988, with three Belgians also standing trial for their role in the disaster: Albert Roosens, the head of the Belgian Football Association, for allowing tickets for the Liverpool section of the stadium to be sold to Juventus fans; and two police chiefs—Michel Kensier and Johan Mahieu—who were in charge of policing at the stadium that night. Two of the 26 Liverpool fans were in custody in Britain at the time and stood trial later. In April 1989, fourteen fans were convicted and given three-year sentences, half of which were suspended for five years, allowing them to return to the UK. One man who was acquitted was Ronnie Jepson, who would go on to make 414 appearances over a thirteen-year career in the English Football League.

== Aftermath ==
=== English club ban ===
Pressure mounted to ban English clubs from European competition. On 31 May 1985, British Prime Minister Margaret Thatcher asked The Football Association (the FA) to withdraw English clubs from European competition before they were banned, but two days later, UEFA banned English clubs for "an indeterminate period of time". On 6 June, the International Federation of Association Football (FIFA) extended this ban to all worldwide matches, but this was modified a week later to allow friendly matches outside Europe to take place. In December 1985, FIFA announced that English clubs were also free to play friendly games in Europe, though the Belgian government banned any English clubs from playing in their country.

Though the England national team was not subjected to any bans, English club sides were banned indefinitely from European club competitions, with Liverpool being provisionally subject to a further three years' suspension as well. In April 1989, following years of campaigning from the English football authorities, UEFA confirmed the reintroduction of English clubs (with the exception of Liverpool) into its competitions from the 1990–91 season onward effective from 11 July 1990. In April 1991 UEFA's executive committee voted to allow Liverpool back into European competition from the 1991–92 season onward, a year later than their compatriots, but two years earlier than initially foreseen. In the end, all English clubs served a five-year-ban, while Liverpool were excluded for six years.

According to former Liverpool striker Ian Rush, who signed with Juventus a year later, he saw pronounced improvement in the institutional relationships between both the clubs and their fans during his career in Italy.

==== England's UEFA coefficient ====
Prior to the introduction of the ban, England were ranked first in the UEFA coefficient ranking due to the performance of English clubs in European competition in the previous five seasons. Throughout the ban, England's points were kept in the ranking until they would have naturally been replaced.

The places vacated by English clubs in the UEFA Cup were reallocated to the best countries who would usually only have two spots in the competition—countries ranked between ninth and twenty-first. For the 1985–86 UEFA Cup, the Soviet Union, France, Czechoslovakia, and the Netherlands were granted an additional spot each, while in 1986–87, Yugoslavia, Czechoslovakia, France, and East Germany were the recipients. The 1987–88 season saw Portugal, Austria, and Sweden gain an additional place, with Sweden and Yugoslavia gaining the places for the 1988–89 competition. The final year of the English ban, 1989–90 saw Austria receive a spot, while a play-off round was played between a French and a Yugoslav side for the final space—due to the two countries having the same number of points in the ranking.

England was removed from the rankings in 1990 due to having no points. England did not return to the top of the coefficient rankings until 2008.

==== Banned clubs ====
The following clubs were denied entry to European competitions during this period:

Seasons	European Cup	European Cup Winners' Cup	UEFA Cup
1985–86	Everton	Manchester United (4th)	Liverpool (2nd); Tottenham Hotspur (3rd); Southampton (5th); Norwich City (League Cup winners; 20th)
1986–87	Liverpool	Everton (2nd)	West Ham United (3rd); Manchester United (4th); Sheffield Wednesday (5th); Oxford United (League Cup winners; 18th)
1987–88	Everton	Coventry City (10th)	Liverpool (2nd); Tottenham Hotspur (3rd); Arsenal (4th, League Cup winners); Norwich City (5th)
1988–89	Liverpool	Wimbledon (6th)	Manchester United (2nd); Nottingham Forest (3rd); Everton (4th); Luton Town (League Cup winners; 9th)
1989–90	Arsenal	Liverpool (2nd)	Nottingham Forest (3rd, League Cup winners); Norwich City (4th); Derby County (5th); Tottenham Hotspur (6th)
1990–91	Liverpool		

The number of places available to English clubs in the UEFA Cup would however have been reduced had English teams been eliminated early in the competition. By the time of the re-admittance of all English clubs except Liverpool in 1990–91, England was only granted one UEFA Cup entrant (awarded to the league runners-up); prior to the ban, they had four entry slots, a number not awarded to England again under regular means.

Welsh clubs playing in the English league system, who could qualify for the European Cup Winners' Cup via the Welsh Cup, were unaffected by the ban. Bangor City (1985–86), (Note: Bangor City finished runners-up of the 1984–85 Welsh Cup to English side Shrewsbury Town; however, English teams cannot qualify for the European Cup Winners' Cup through the Welsh Cup.) Wrexham (1986–87), Merthyr Tydfil (1987–88), Cardiff City (1988–89), and Swansea City (1989–90) all competed in the Cup Winners' Cup during the ban on English clubs, despite playing in the English league system.

In the meantime, many other clubs missed out on a place in the UEFA Cup due to the return of English clubs to European competitions only being gradual—in 1990, the league had no UEFA coefficient points used to calculate the number of teams, and even though Manchester United won the Cup Winners' Cup in the first season of returning in 1990–91, it took several more years for England to win back the points to the previous level, due to the coefficient being calculated over a five-year period and there being a one-year delay between the publication of the rankings and their impact on club allocation.

Liverpool's additional year of exclusion from Europe meant that there was no English representation in the 1990–91 European Cup, as they were 1989–90 Football League First Division champions.

==== Repercussions on UEFA Cup qualification ====
Due to the weak coefficient, Football League Cup winners Nottingham Forest also missed out on UEFA Cup places in 1990–91, along with Tottenham Hotspur and Arsenal. The teams who missed out on the 1991–92 UEFA Cup, for the same reason were Sheffield Wednesday, Crystal Palace, and Leeds United. Arsenal and Manchester City were unable to take part for the 1992–93 competition. For 1993–94, Blackburn Rovers and Queens Park Rangers would have qualified.

Leeds United missed out in 1994–95 and initially 1995–96, though they qualified for the latter via the new UEFA Fair Play ranking, which at the time gave their three top-ranking associations' highest-placed team who've not already qualified for Europe a UEFA Cup spot. Remaining outside the top three of the coefficient rankings, England retained its three UEFA Cup berths instead of four. Sixth-placed Everton lost a Fair Play berth for 1996–97 by UEFA, as punishment for the FA due to Tottenham Hotspur and Wimbledon fielding weakened teams in the 1995 UEFA Intertoto Cup.

By this point, while England's coefficient was no longer directly affected by the ban due to its being outside the five-year window, their coefficient continued to be affected by years of under-representation in the competition. As a result, Aston Villa missed out via their league position for 1997–98 and 1998–99 but qualified for both through Fair Play. Restructuring of UEFA competitions for 1999–2000 gave the top six associations of the coefficient ranking three UEFA Cup berths (the top three gained four Champions League berths, whilst 4–6 got three), which England now reached, whilst associations ranked seventh and eighth were given four berths for the competition.

== Commemorations ==
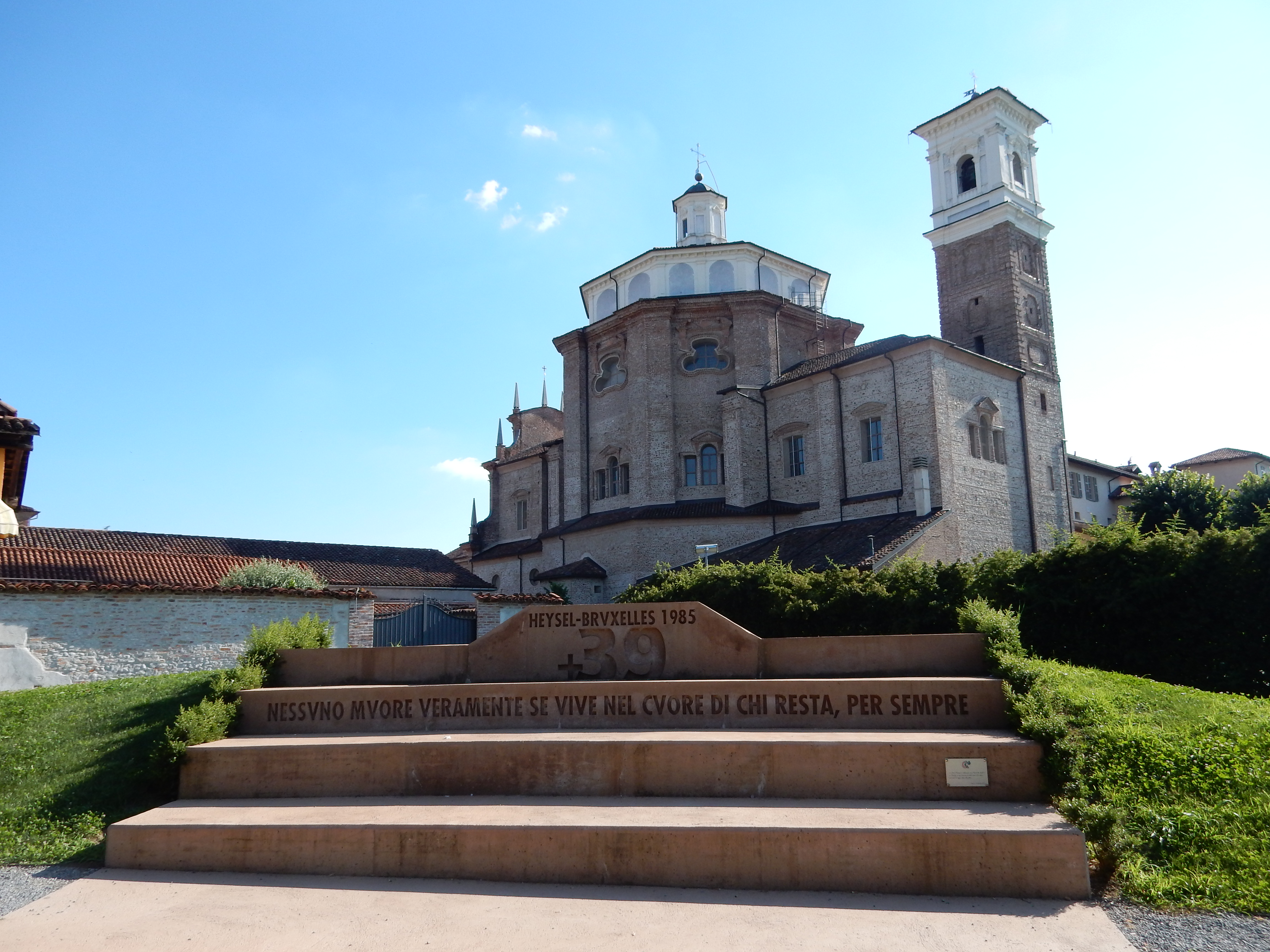
Monument at Cherasco, Italy

In 1985, a memorial was presented to the victims at the Juventus headquarters in Piazza Crimea, Turin. The monument includes an epitaph written by Torinese journalist Giovanni Arpino. Since 2001 to 2017, it has been situated in front of the club's headquarters in Corso Galileo Ferraris, and since then in Juventus Headquarter.

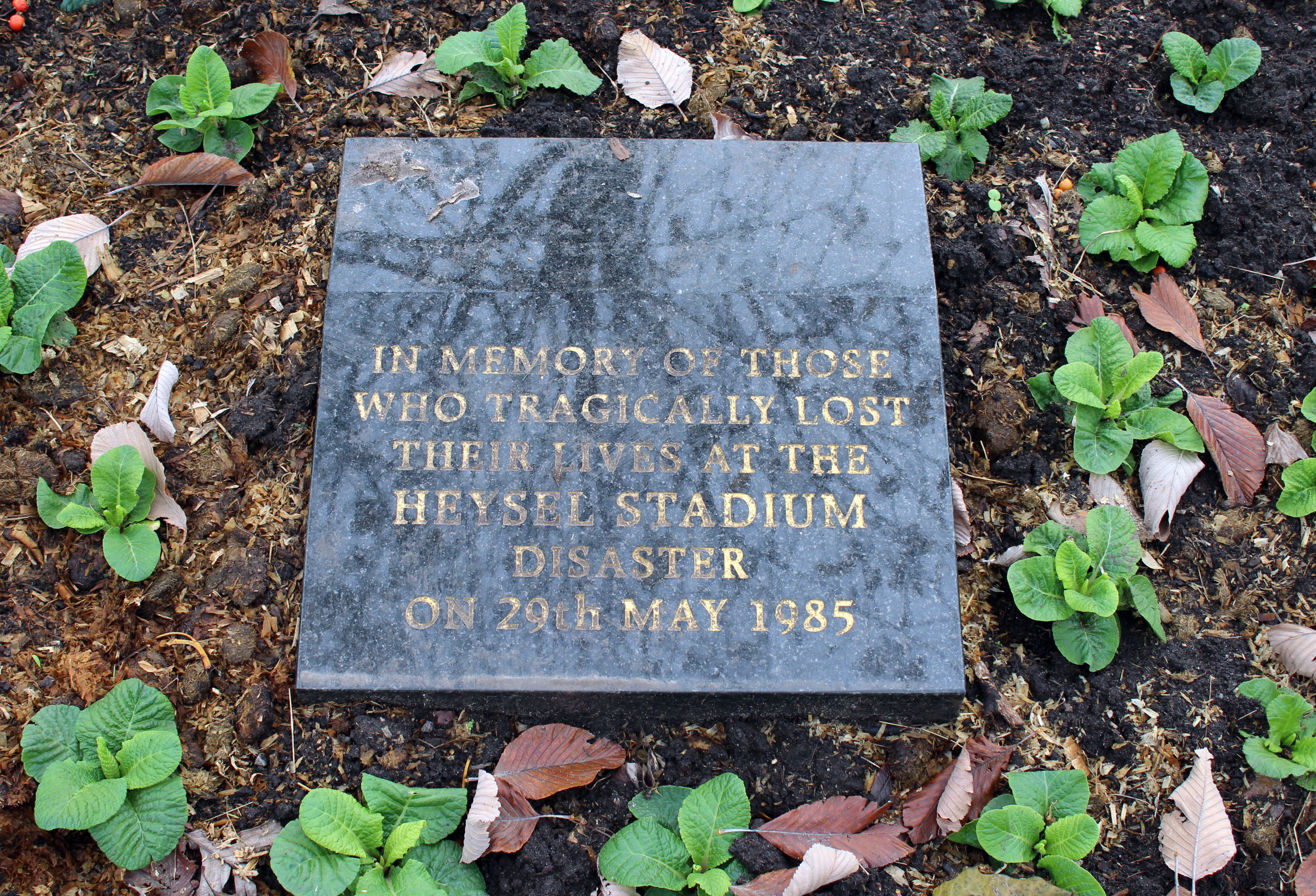
Memorial in St John's Gardens, Liverpool

In 1991, another memorial monument for the 39 victims of the disaster, was inaugurated in Reggio Emilia, the hometown of the victim Claudio Zavaroni, in front of Stadio Mirabello: every year the committee "Per non dimenticare Heysel" (In order not to forget Heysel) holds a ceremony on 29 May with relatives of the victims, representatives of Juventus, survivors and various supporters clubs from various football clubs, including Inter Milan, AC Milan, Reggiana and Torino. During Euro 2000, members of the Italian team left flowers on the site in honour of the victims.

On 29 May 2005, a £140,000 sculpture was unveiled at the new Heysel stadium, to commemorate the disaster. The monument is a sundial designed by French artist Patrick Rimoux and includes Italian and Belgian stone and the poem "Funeral Blues" by Englishman W. H. Auden to symbolise the sorrow of the three countries. 39 lights shine, one for each who died that night.

On Wednesday 26 May 2010, a permanent plaque was unveiled on the Centenary Stand at Anfield to honour the Juventus fans who died 25 years earlier. This plaque is one of two permanent memorials to be found at Anfield, along with one for the 97 fans killed in the Hillsborough disaster in 1989. In May 2012, a Heysel Memorial was unveiled in the J-Museum at Turin. There is also a tribute to the disaster's victims in the club's Walk of Fame in front of the Juventus Stadium. Two years later, Juventus' officials announced a memorial in the Continassa headquarter. In February 2014, an exhibition in Turin was dedicated both to the Heysel tragedy and Superga air disaster. The name of the exhibition was "Settanta angeli in un unico cielo – Superga e Heysel tragedie sorelle" (70 angels in the one same heaven – Superga and Heysel sister tragedies) and gathered material from 4 May 1949 and 29 May 1985.

On 12 November 2015, the Italian Football Federation (FIGC), Juventus' representatives led by Mariella Scirea and J-Museum president Paolo Garimberti and members of the Italian victims association held a ceremony in front of the Heysel monument in King Baudouin Stadium for the 30th anniversary of the event. The following day, FIGC president Carlo Tavecchio announced the retirement of Squadra Azzurra's number 39 shirt prior to the friendly match between Italy and Belgium.

=== At games ===
A memorial service for those killed in the disaster was held before Liverpool's match with Arsenal at Anfield on 18 August 1985, their first fixture after the disaster. However, according to The Sydney Morning Herald, it was "drowned out" by chanting.

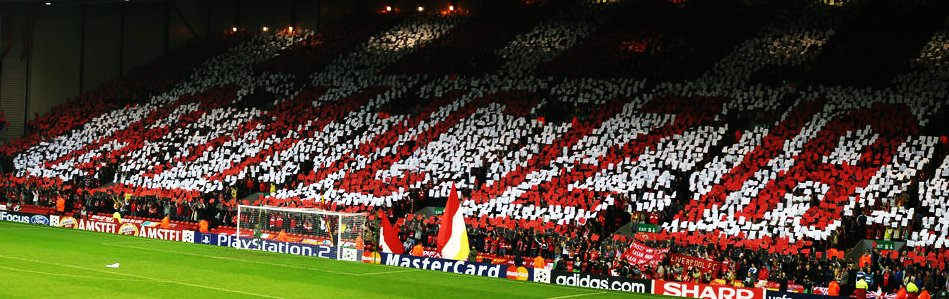
The Kop creates a mosaic saying "Amicizia" ("Friendship") before Liverpool played Juventus at Anfield in April 2005

Juventus and Liverpool were drawn together in the quarter-finals of the 2004–05 Champions League, their first meeting since Heysel. Before the first leg at Anfield, Liverpool fans held up placards to form a banner saying "amicizia" ("friendship" in Italian). The gesture was met with a mixed reaction from Juventus fans, with some applauding and others choosing to turn their backs on it. In the return leg in Turin, Juventus fans displayed banners reading "Easy to speak, difficult to pardon: Murders", "15–4–89. Sheffield" and "God exists", the latter a reference to the Hillsborough disaster, in which 97 Liverpool fans were killed in a crush. A number of Liverpool fans were attacked in the city by Juventus ultras.

In May 2015, during a Serie A match between Juventus and Napoli at Turin, Juventus fans held up placards to form a banner saying "+39 Rispetto" ("respect +39" in Italian), including the names of the victims of the disaster.

In an interview with Planet Football, Liverpool footballer Mark Lawrenson spoke about his experience in the immediate aftermath of the Heysel Stadium disaster, describing it as a "surreal, ugly night" and "a horrific chain of events."

== See also ==
- Crowd control
- Crowd control barrier
- Crowd manipulation
- Hillsborough disaster
- English football clubs in international competitions
- Football hooliganism in the United Kingdom
- Juventus F.C. in international football
- Liverpool F.C. in international football
- 2017 Turin stampede
- Kanjuruhan Stadium disaster
