= Murder of Jeanne Van Calck =

Unsolved Belgian child murder

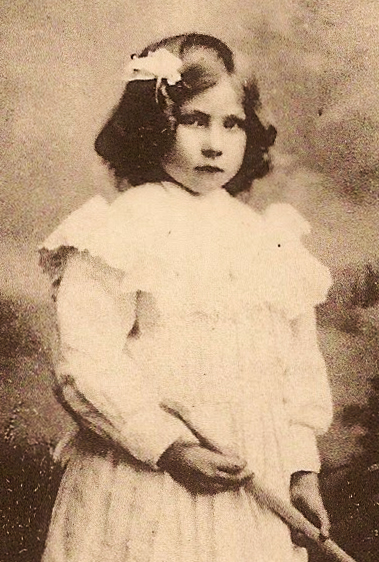
- Born: 17 September 1897; Brussels, Belgium
- Died: 7 February 1906 (aged 8); Brussels, Belgium

Jeanne Van Calck (17 September 1897 – 7 February 1906), also known as Joanna, was a Belgian child murder victim whose case became a symbol for childhood innocence. Her dismembered body was found on the evening of 7 February 1906, at 22, rue des Hirondelles/Zwaluwenstraat in Brussels. The murder, now known as the Murder of the Rue des Hirondelles, was never solved.

== The Murder of the Rue des Hirondelles ==
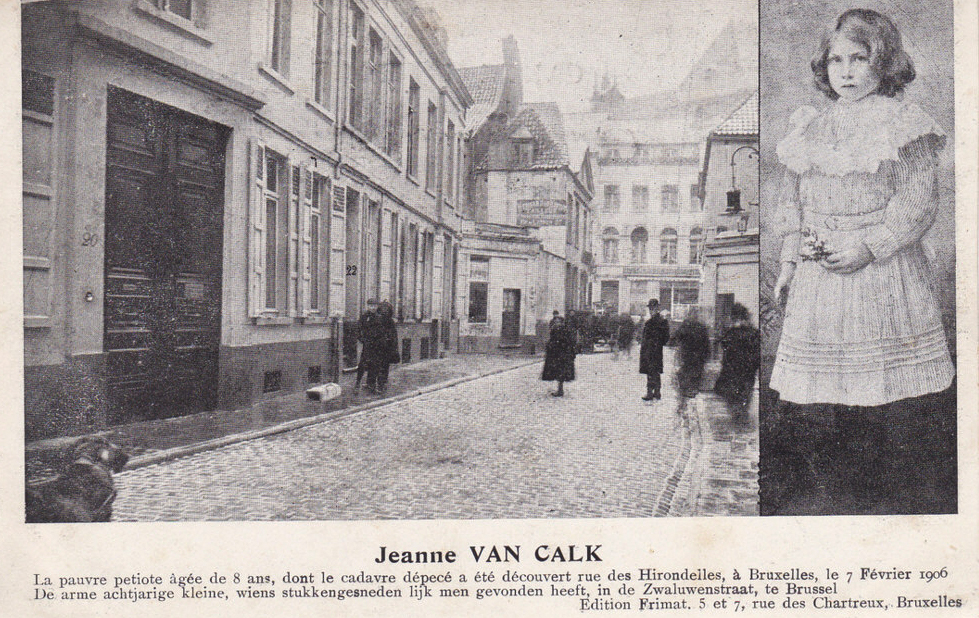
Jeanne's corpse was discovered at 22, rue des Hirondelles/Zwaluwenstraat

Jeanne Van Calck lived with her grandparents in Brussels but habitually visited her mother, Françoise Van Calck, for an hour or two each evening, generally accompanied by her grandfather. Her father was a typographer working for the Le Soir newspaper, who had abandoned the family and never knew his daughter. At 18:30 on the evening of 7 February 1906, Jeanne left her grandparents' home as usual, but for the first time was allowed to go alone, as her grandfather was working. She never arrived at her mother's home on the corner of the Boulevard Baudouin/Boudewijnlaan.

Around 23:45, a machinist from the Théâtre de l'Alhambra, Joseph Eylenbosch, and his son discovered a suspicious package outside the door of 22, rue des Hirondelles/Zwaluwenstraat (a house that was demolished in 1965). A policeman, Gustave Vandamme, was called to inspect it. He was joined by a colleague, Pierre Noël, who helped carry the package to the police station on the Place du Nouveau Marché aux Grains/Nieuwe Graanmarkt. The Department Chief, Desmedt, inspected the curious package and asked Noël to open it. The first thing they saw was a blue pea coat and a checkered dress, and after taking a closer look, they found frozen blood. The still-warm corpse of a little girl, which had been dismembered and wrapped up in thick paper, tied with a hemp cord, fell to the ground. The child's legs had also been amputated and were not present.

Messengers were sent to awaken the commissioner, and the public prosecutor and the press were immediately informed. When two men arrived at the police station to report Jeanne's disappearance, it was found that the clothes she had been wearing corresponded to those discovered. The next day, a huge crowd gathered in front of 22, rue des Hirondelles. Françoise Van Calck was present, and upon hearing the news of her daughter's death, she fainted.

=== Investigation, funeral and popular discontent ===
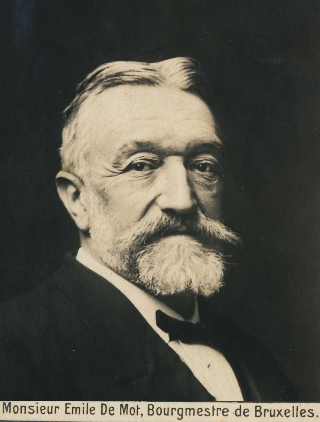
Emile De Mot

The coroner who examined the body was categorical that the murder had been carried out by somebody with specialist knowledge, probably a doctor or a butcher. The cause of death was quickly established: Jeanne had died of suffocation from violent vomiting after being forced to drink a large quantity of alcohol, in addition to violent abuse. The time of death was fixed between 20:00 and 21:00.

The funeral was held on 11 February, with over ten thousand people in attendance. The burgomaster, Emile De Mot, presided over the collection of the body from Saint-Pierre Hospital's mortuary and accompanied the funeral procession. The police guarded the coffin, while the crowd shouted in anger. Jeanne was taken to Brussels Cemetery in Evere, where she was buried and remains to this day.

The police began searching for the little girl's killer, dragging the canals to find her legs, which were still missing. On 16 February, a gardener by the name of Buelens found two packages about 40 cm in length in the park of the royal Stuyvenbergh farm. The day before, Jeanne's boots had been found close by. The Belgian government offered a reward of 20,000 Belgian francs to anyone who could identify the murderer and even offered leniency with regard to any person indirectly involved who incriminated themselves.

A police dog, Folette, and her handler, Agent Librechts, were dispatched to the crime scene. The dog stopped at 22, rue des Hirondelles, then another house and barked at length in front of the grandparents' house. Later, a Spaniard and an Algerian were remanded in custody, but both were released without charge. Jean Many, a butcher's apprentice who begged in the streets, was similarly arrested but released. Sometime later, a bloody shirt was found on the Chaussée de Wavre/Waversesteenweg. A Dr Nyssens was considered a person of interest, but no convincing leads were uncovered.

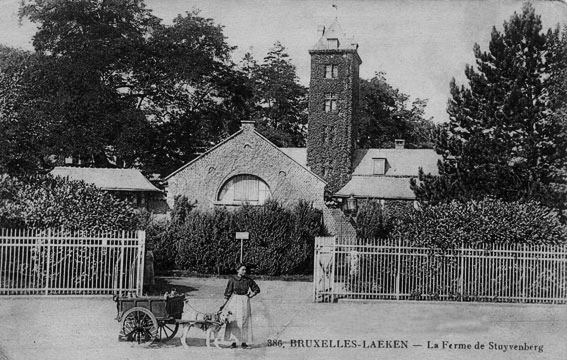
The Stuyvenbergh farm, c. 1900

The newspapers of the time criticised the carelessness and incompetence of the authorities, who never managed to solve the crime. A Parisian lawyer, Louis Frank, gained access to the files and listed 29 failures in the investigation, publishing his findings in 1909. Some leads had never been followed up because they came from a little girl. She reported seeing her friend around 7 p.m. on the night of her murder near her grandparents' house, accompanied by a man she seemed to trust, but heading in the opposite direction from her mother's home.

Émile Rossel, the owner of Le Soir at the time, opened a subscription service to fund a white marble monument in homage to the "Little Angel of the Rue des Hirondelles". The following year, another child, Annette Bellot, was found dead in Anderlecht, under similar circumstances. Her killer, like Jeanne's, was never found.

== See also ==
- List of unsolved murders (1900–1979)
- History of Brussels
- Belgium in the long nineteenth century
