= Charles Lemonnier =

Belgian politician (1860–1930)

Baron Charles Lemonnier GBE
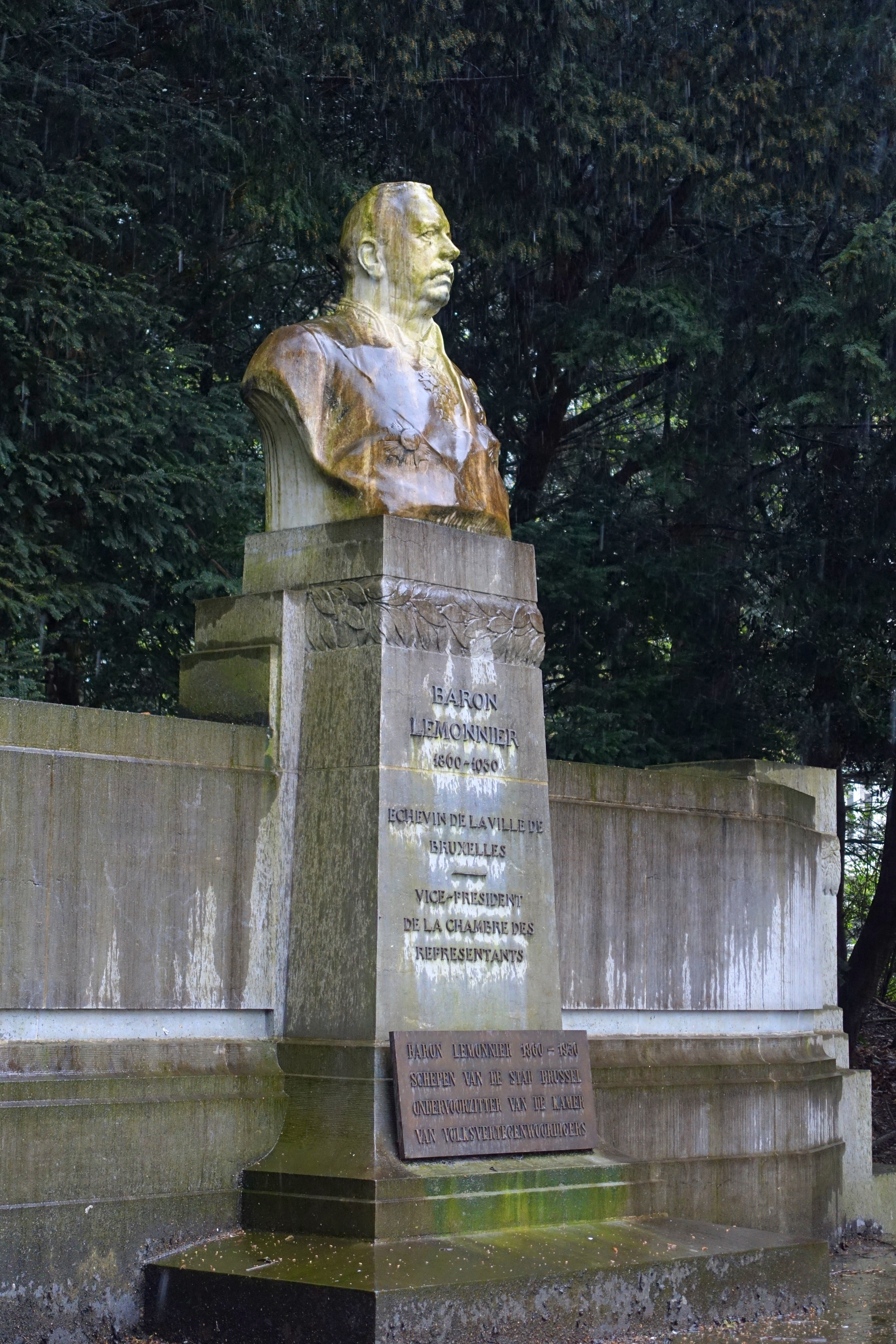
- Monument to Baron Lemonnier by Frans Huygelen, after a model by Thomas Vinçotte
- Born: Charles Jean Maurice Lemonnier; 12 January 1860; Mons, Belgium
- Died: 11 September 1930 (aged 70); Brussels, Belgium
- Occupation: politician
- Title: Baron

Baron Charles Jean Maurice Lemonnier (12 January 1860 – 11 September 1930) was a Belgian liberal politician and mayor of the City of Brussels.

Charles Lemonnier was a lawyer, mining engineer and as a politician he was alderman ad-interim burgomaster of Brussels. He was also a member of parliament. During World War I he took over as burgomaster of Brussels, while Adolphe Max was held in captivity by the Germans.

== Honours ==
- Grand Officer in the Order of Leopold (Belgium) - 1919
- Grand Cross in the Order of the Crown (Belgium) - 1921
- Honorary Knight Grand Cross in the Order of the British Empire (United Kingdom)
- Grand Officer in the Legion of Honour (France)

== See also ==
- List of mayors of the City of Brussels
