= Benelux Fountain =

Monument in Brussels, Belgium

- Fontaine Benelux (French); Beneluxfontein (Dutch)
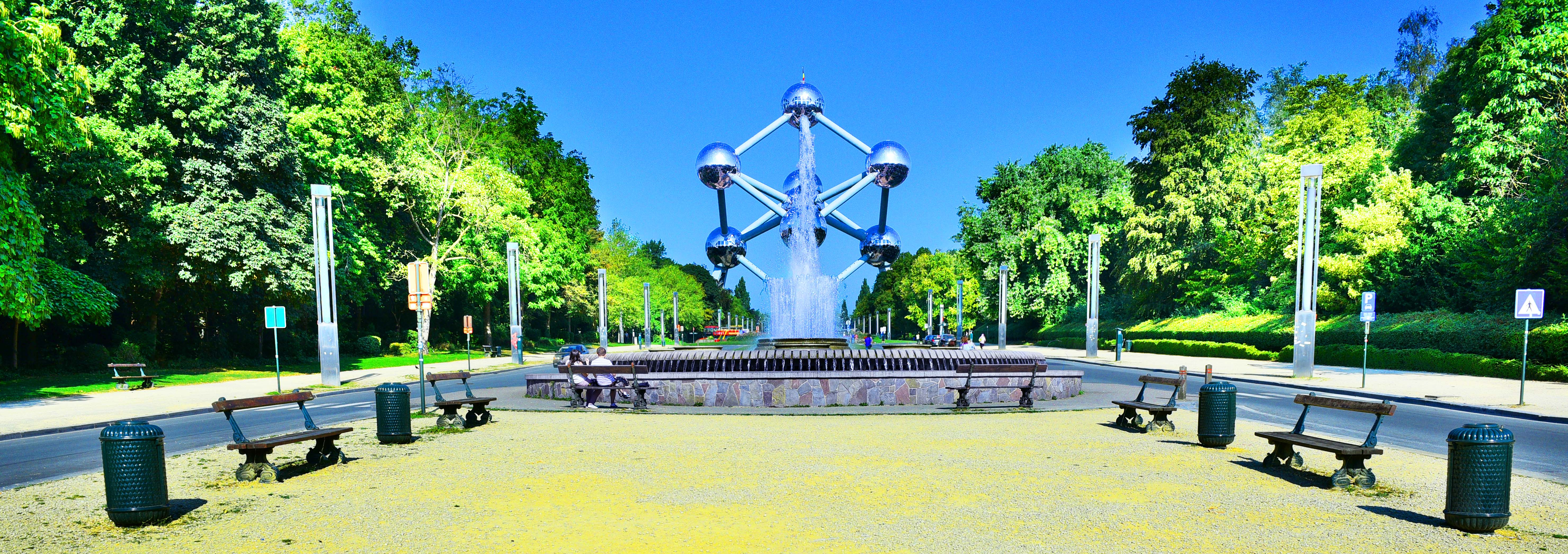
- Interactive map of Benelux Fountain
- Location: Place du Benelux / Beneluxplein; 1020, Laeken, City of Brussels, Brussels-Capital Region, Belgium
- Coordinates: 50°53′29.65″N 4°20′40.31″E
- Type: Fountain
- Material: Rubble masonry
- Inauguration date: 17 April 1958
- Restored date: 2008
- Dedicated to: Benelux

The Benelux Fountain (French: Fontaine Benelux; Dutch: Beneluxfontein) is a public fountain located on the Boulevard du Centenaire/Eeuwfeestlaan in Laeken, Brussels, Belgium. It was designed by the Groupe Pyjama architectural firm for the 1958 Brussels World's Fair (Expo 58), and represents the cooperation between the Benelux countries: Belgium, the Netherlands, and Luxembourg.

The fountain is an example of post-war modernist architecture, featuring geometric forms and the use of exposed concrete. In 2021, the surrounding area was redeveloped and renamed the Place du Benelux/Beneluxplein, and in 2024, the fountain was listed on the Inventory of Architectural Heritage of the Brussels-Capital Region.

== History ==
=== Origins and Expo 58 ===
The Benelux Fountain was constructed as part of the architectural and urban developments for Expo 58. Located on the central green area at the foot of the Boulevard du Centenaire/Eeuwfeestlaan, the fountain was a round concrete structure designed to be one of the fair's focal points. It was positioned opposite the Benelux Gate, which served as the southern entrance to the exhibition.

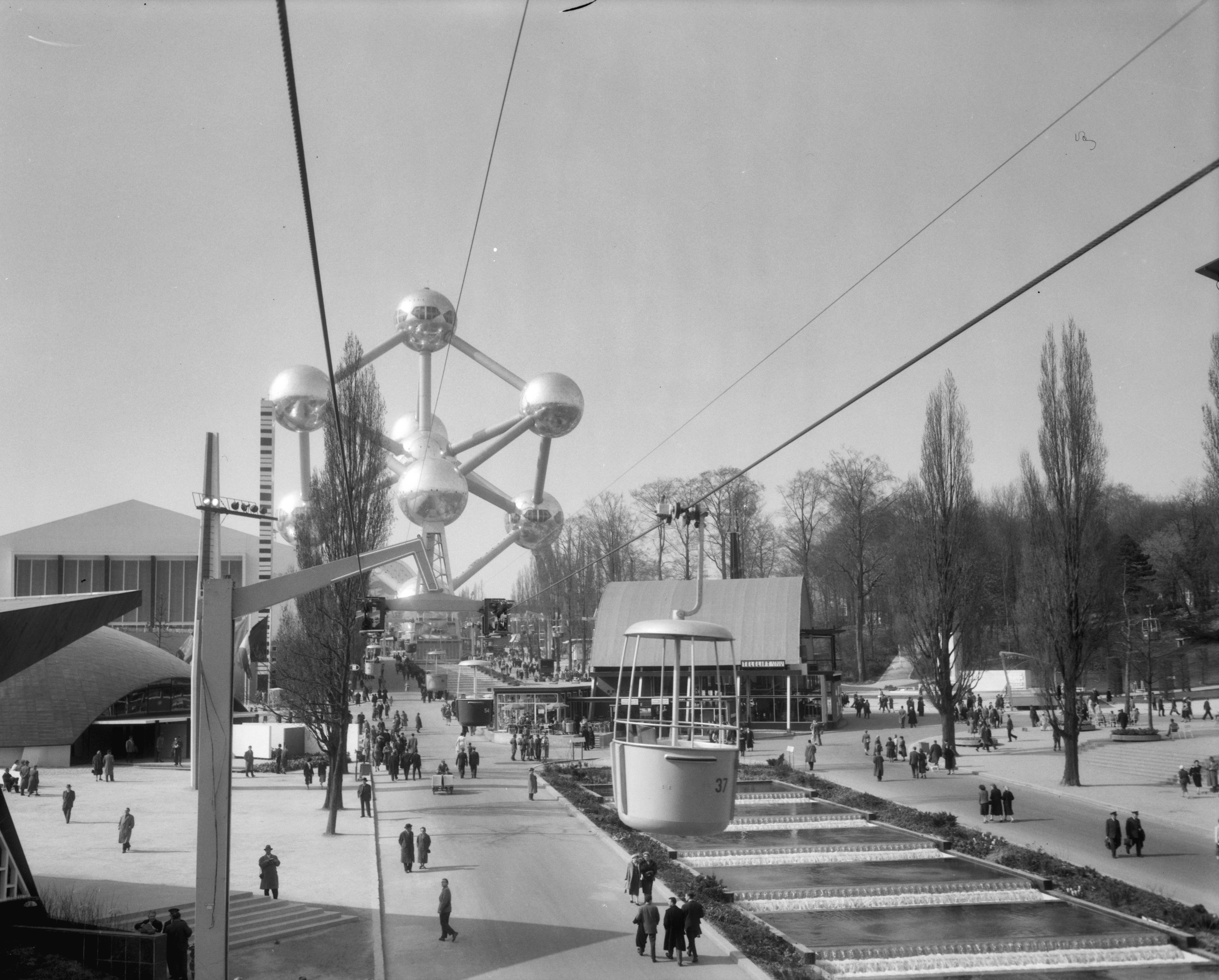
The 450-metre-long (1,480 ft) water staircase during Expo 58

The fountain was the culmination of a 450-metre-long (1,480 ft) water staircase that ran along the avenue's median strip, starting from the Place de Belgique/Belgiëplein. At night, the movements and lighting of the water jets were synchronised with music, creating a dynamic and captivating spectacle. The design symbolised the cooperation among the Benelux countries, which signed the Treaty Establishing the Benelux Economic Union in 1958, the same year as Expo 58.

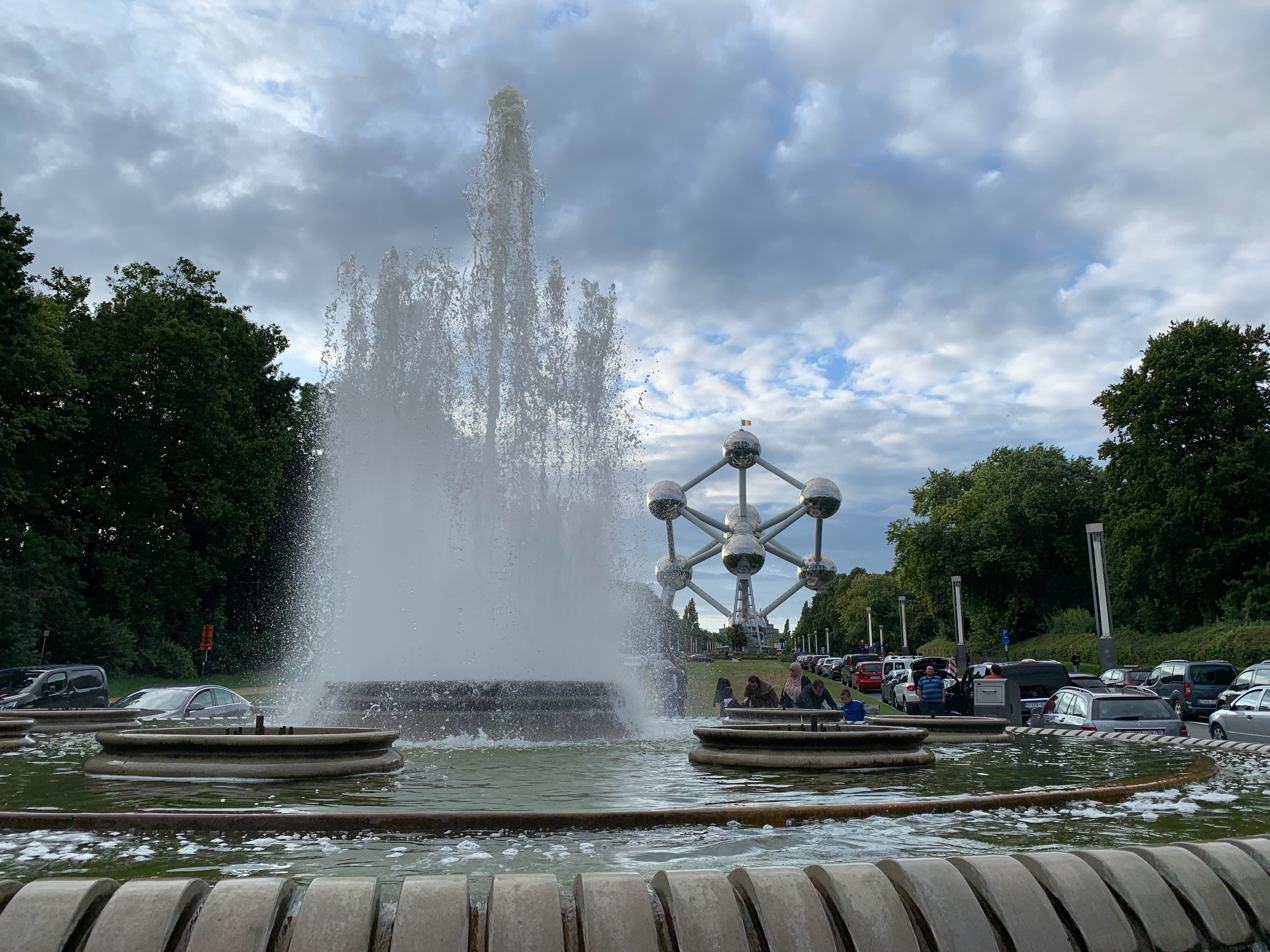
The Place du Benelux in 2021 with the Atomium in the background

=== Renovation and inauguration of the Place du Benelux ===
In 1978–79, the fountain's technical equipment was updated. Later, in 2008, to mark the 50th anniversary of Expo 58, the fountain underwent a major renovation. The work was carried out by Urbastyle, a manufacturer of prefabricated concrete, which reproduced the fountain's decorative elements to match the original design. This restoration aimed to preserve the fountain's historical significance while updating it to modern standards.

In 2021, the City of Brussels undertook a project to redevelop the area around the fountain, transforming it into a pedestrian-friendly square with landscaping, lighting, and urban furniture. On 14 September 2021, the square was officially inaugurated as the Place du Benelux/Beneluxplein.

The inauguration ceremony was attended by Mayor Philippe Close, Alderwoman for Urban Planning Ans Persoons, Minister of Foreign Affairs Sophie Wilmès, and Secretary-General of the Benelux Union Alain de Muyser. During the ceremony, Minister Wilmès highlighted the ongoing role of the Benelux Union in European integration, particularly in areas such as free trade and data exchange.

On 19 August 2024, the Benelux Fountain was officially added to the Inventory of Architectural Heritage of the Brussels-Capital Region.

== Description ==
The Benelux Fountain features a modernist design, characterised by its geometric shapes and use of exposed concrete, which was common in mid-20th-century public architecture. The fountain consists of a central pool with sculptural water features that are arranged in a minimalist manner.

The fountain is located at the foot of the Atomium, within the Heysel/Heizel area. The surrounding Place du Benelux includes green spaces and open areas, designed to complement the fountain's modernist style. The square is accessible to pedestrians and provides a setting that allows the public to engage with the fountain in its contemporary urban context.

As a public monument, the Benelux Fountain serves as a reminder of the post-war period and the Benelux Union, symbolising the cooperation and shared interests between the three founding countries.

== See also ==
- Sculpture in Brussels
- History of Brussels
