= Joseph Van De Meulebroeck =

Belgian liberal politician and mayor of Brussels (1876–1958)

Baron Joseph Van de Meulebroeck
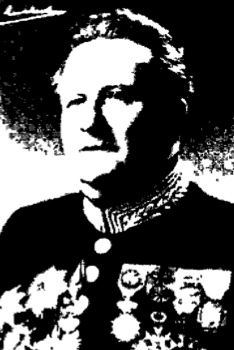

Mayor of Brussels
- In office 28 November 1939 – 13 February 1956 (Note: Temporarily succeeded by Jules Coelst and disputed with Jan Grauls from 30 June 1941 to 3 September 1944, during the German occupation of Belgium during World War II.)
- Preceded by: Adolphe Max
- Succeeded by: Lucien Cooremans

Personal details
- Born: Frédéric Joseph Vandemeulebroek; 17 November 1876; Laeken, Belgium
- Died: 14 December 1958 (aged 82); Brussels, Belgium
- Political party: Liberal Party
- Occupation: Politician

Baron Frédéric Joseph Vandemeulebroek (often spelled Van de Meulebroeck; 17 November 1876 – 14 December 1958) was a Belgian liberal politician and mayor of the City of Brussels between 1939 and 1942 and again between 1944 and 1956.

== Personal life and family ==
Jef Vandemeulebroek was the son of Franciscus-Xaverius Vandemeulebroek, a travelling salesman, and Anna Maria Ludovica Bosmans. After receiving a degree in Medicine from the Free University of Brussels in 1901, he set up a practice in Laeken. On his death-bed in October 1958, he married his long-term companion Louisa Degueldre (1898–1985), with whom he had had a son, Jacques, who had been born in Ixelles in 1932.

Throughout his life, he encountered repeated problems with the accepted spelling of his name. Although his official name was "Vandemeulebroek", even many official papers dating to his period as mayor are erroneously spelled "Van de Meulebroeck".

== Political career ==
Vandemeulebroek became a communal councilor in 1907, and in 1912 became alderman of Public Instruction in Laeken. During World War I, he volunteered as a military doctor and served as part of the 6th Regiment of Artillery. When the commune of Laeken was annexed by the City of Brussels in 1921, he became a communal councilor in Brussels and, from 1930 until 1939, alderman of Public Works. As vice-president of the Brussels International Exposition of 1935, he continued his work promoting public works, and the Centenary Palace and reordering of the Heysel/Heizel Plateau date to this period.

From 17 November 1932 to 1936, he served as deputy for the Liberal Party for the region of Brussels. From 28 November 1939, he succeeded the late Adolphe Max as mayor of Brussels.

=== World War II ===
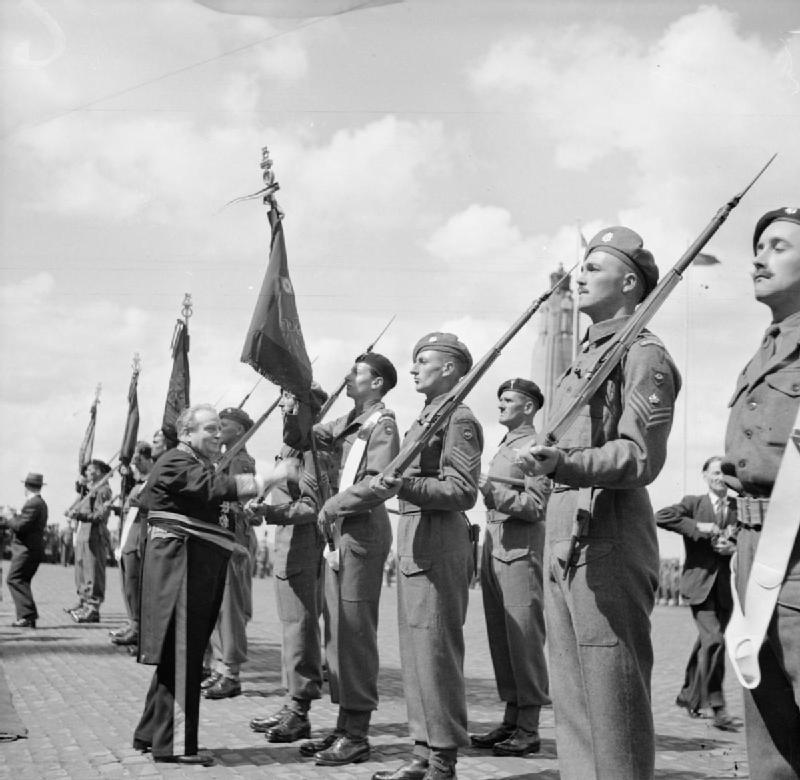
Joseph Van de Meulebroeck presents colours to the British Guards Armoured Division at the victory parade in Brussels in 1945

After the German occupation of Belgium in 1940, it became clear that Vandemeulebroek's patriotic stance would not be tolerated for long by the Germans. The pretext offered for his removal was an Amtsverbot order fixing an age limit of 60 on officials in public office; at the time, Vandemeulebroek was aged 65. Ironically, his designated successor, Jules Coelst, was six years older.

Even before his dismissal, however, he was arrested on 30 June 1941 and deported to Germany. He addressed the population in a "Proclamation" poster, which stated that "Contrary to what has been said, I have neither abandoned my post nor submitted my resignation. I am, I remain and I will remain the legitimate mayor of Brussels." Coelst did not remain in the position long, and on 24 September 1942, the City of Brussels was joined with its largely Flemish-speaking suburbs to form the new region of Groß-Brüssel ("Greater Brussels"), in which the Flamingant Jan Grauls was named mayor.

=== After the Liberation ===
When the city was liberated at the beginning of September 1944, Joseph Vandemeulebroek was reinstated as mayor. Returning to his office in the town hall, he opened the window and symbolically threw his cushion, sullied by the previous occupant, onto the Grand-Place. He later received Winston Churchill, Dwight Eisenhower, Bernard Montgomery and Charles de Gaulle.

As a result of his declining health, Joseph Vandemeulebroek submitted his resignation of the position of mayor which was accepted on 13 February 1956. He was succeeded by Lucien Cooremans. Vandemeulebroek was given the title of Baron by King Baudouin in 1953.

== Notes ==
Political offices
Preceded by Adolphe Max	Mayor of Brussels; 1939–1956	Succeeded by Lucien Cooremans
