= Philippe Close =

Belgian politician (born 1971)

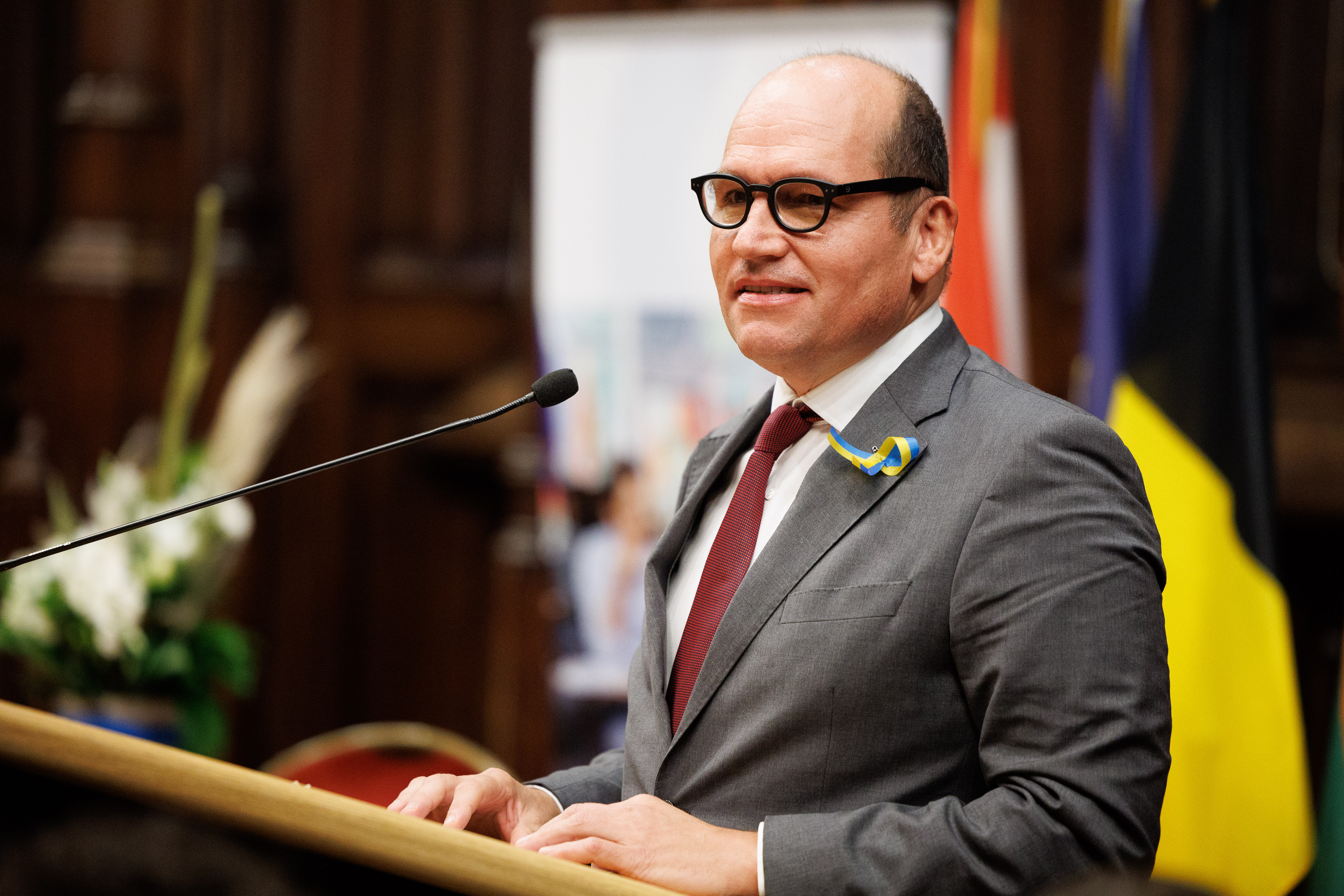
- Close in 2022

Mayor of Brussels
- Incumbent
- Assumed office 9 June 2017
- Preceded by: Yvan Mayeur

Personal details
- Born: 18 March 1971 (age 54) Namur, Belgium
- Party: Socialist Party

Philippe Close (born 18 March 1971) is a Belgian politician from the Socialist Party who has served as mayor of the City of Brussels since 2017.

== Biography ==
Close has a law degree from Université libre de Bruxelles. In 2000, he became Elio Di Rupo's spokesman before joining the City of Brussels in 2001, as the chief of staff of Mayor Freddy Thielemans.

In 2006, he was elected to the Brussels City Council, after which he became alderman.

In 2009, he was elected as member of the Brussels Parliament.

In 2013, he was considered as successor to Brussels Mayor Freddy Thielemans (PS), but the office went to Yvan Mayeur (PS). Following financial scandals in 2017, Mayeur resigned and was succeeded by Close.
