= Yvan Mayeur =

Belgian politician (born 1960)

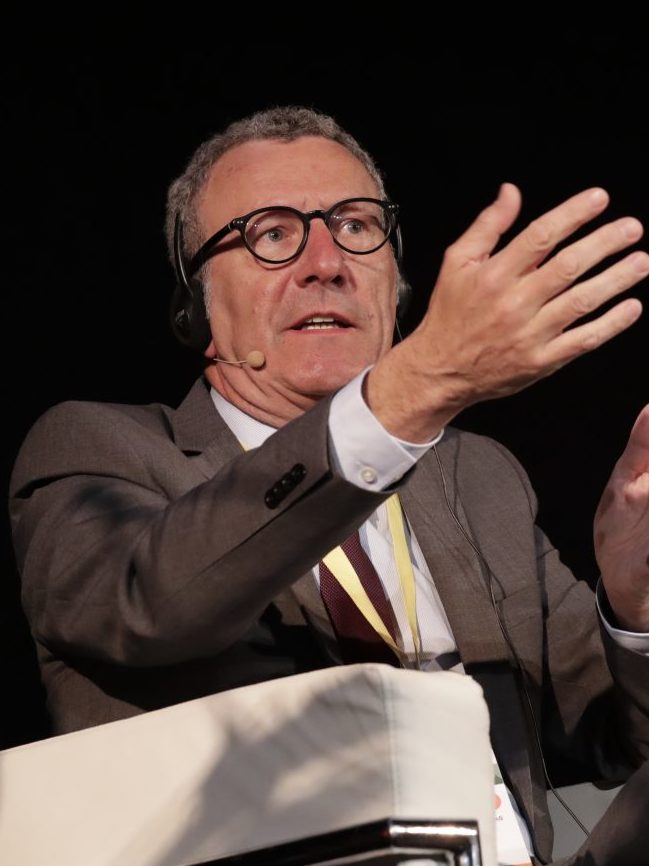
- Mayeur in 2017

Mayor of Brussels
- In office 13 December 2013 – 8 June 2017
- Preceded by: Freddy Thielemans
- Succeeded by: Philippe Close

Personal details
- Born: 24 January 1960 (age 65); Etterbeek, Belgium
- Political party: Socialist Party

Yvan Mayeur (born 24 January 1960) is a former Belgian politician from the Socialist Party who served as mayor of the City of Brussels from 2013 to 2017.

Nationally, Mayeur was a member of the Chamber of Representatives since 1999, and previously from 1989 to 1995.

Locally, Mayeur is elected city councillor of Brussels since 1995 and the chairperson of the CPAS/OCMW of Brussels until he took office as mayor of Brussels on 13 December 2013, succeeding Freddy Thielemans who resigned due to his age. In 2017, Majeur was forced to offer his resignation as mayor of Brussels after it had become apparent that he had stolen from Samusocial, a municipal humanitarian emergency service for the homeless in Brussels. He was entitled to receive a fee for each meeting, but the number of meetings had been increased tremendously, with many of them not even having taken place.

Mayeur quit the Socialist Party on 30 June 2017, days before the party leadership would deliberate about his membership. He was succeeded as mayor of Brussels by Philippe Close (PS).
