= Lucien Cooremans =

Belgian liberal politician and mayor of Brussels (1899–1985)

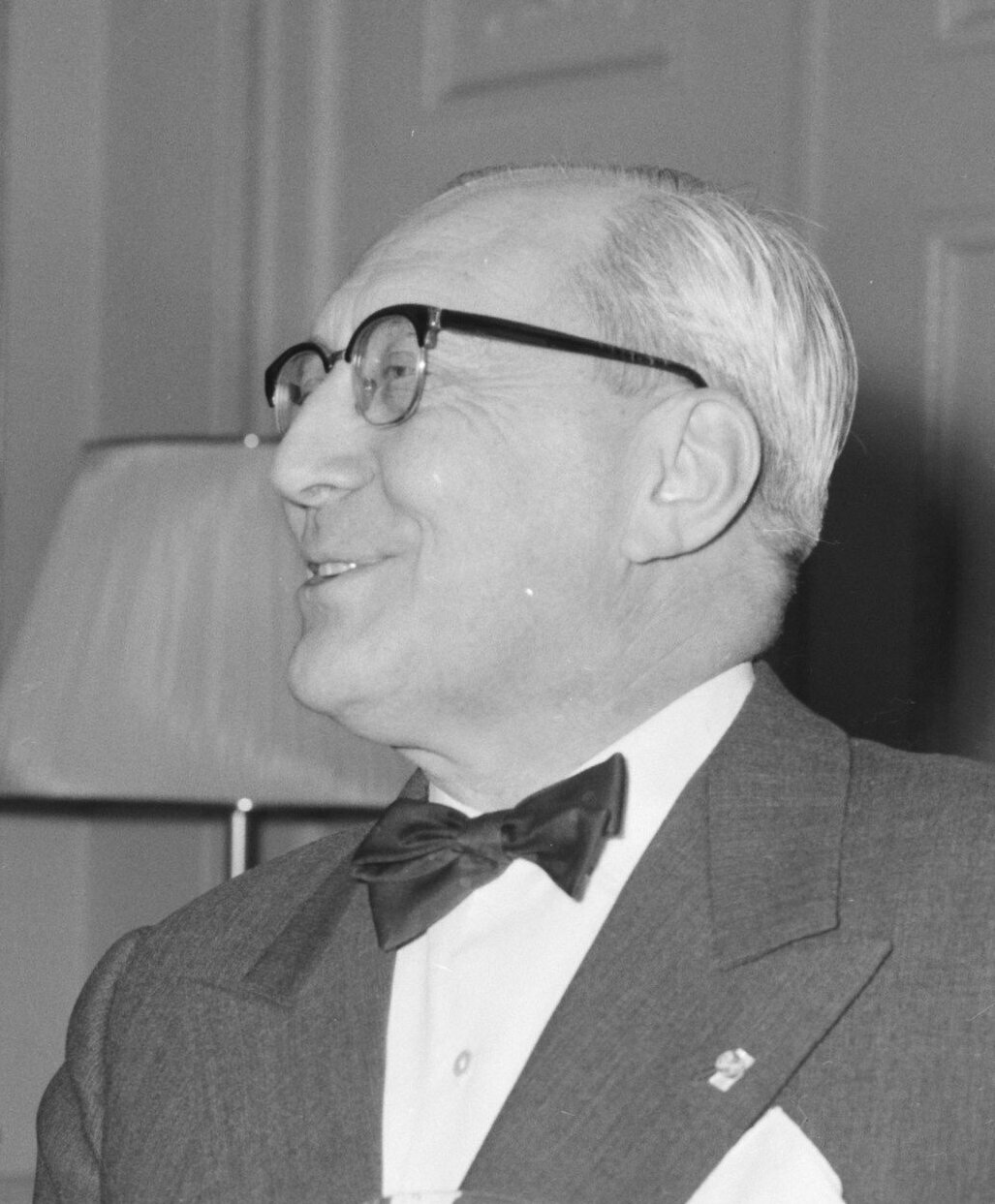
- Cooremans in 1961

Mayor of Brussels
- In office 14 February 1956 – 29 August 1975
- Preceded by: Joseph Van De Meulebroeck
- Succeeded by: Pierre Van Halteren

Personal details
- Born: Lucien Georges François Philippe Cooremans; 1 September 1899 Saint-Gilles, Belgium
- Died: 22 February 1985 (aged 85) Brussels, Belgium
- Occupation: Politician, lawyer, journalist, professor

Lucien Georges François Philippe Cooremans (1 September 1899 – 22 February 1985) was a Belgian liberal politician and mayor of the City of Brussels from 1956 to 1975.

He was a lawyer, journalist and professor at the Université libre de Bruxelles. As a politician, he was a member of parliament, alderman and mayor of Brussels from 1956 until 1975. He was the leading figure of the 1958 Brussels World's Fair (Expo 58). He was responsible for the destruction of the Maison du Peuple/Volkshuis. In 1958, he was awarded the Order of Saint Agatha by the Republic of San Marino.

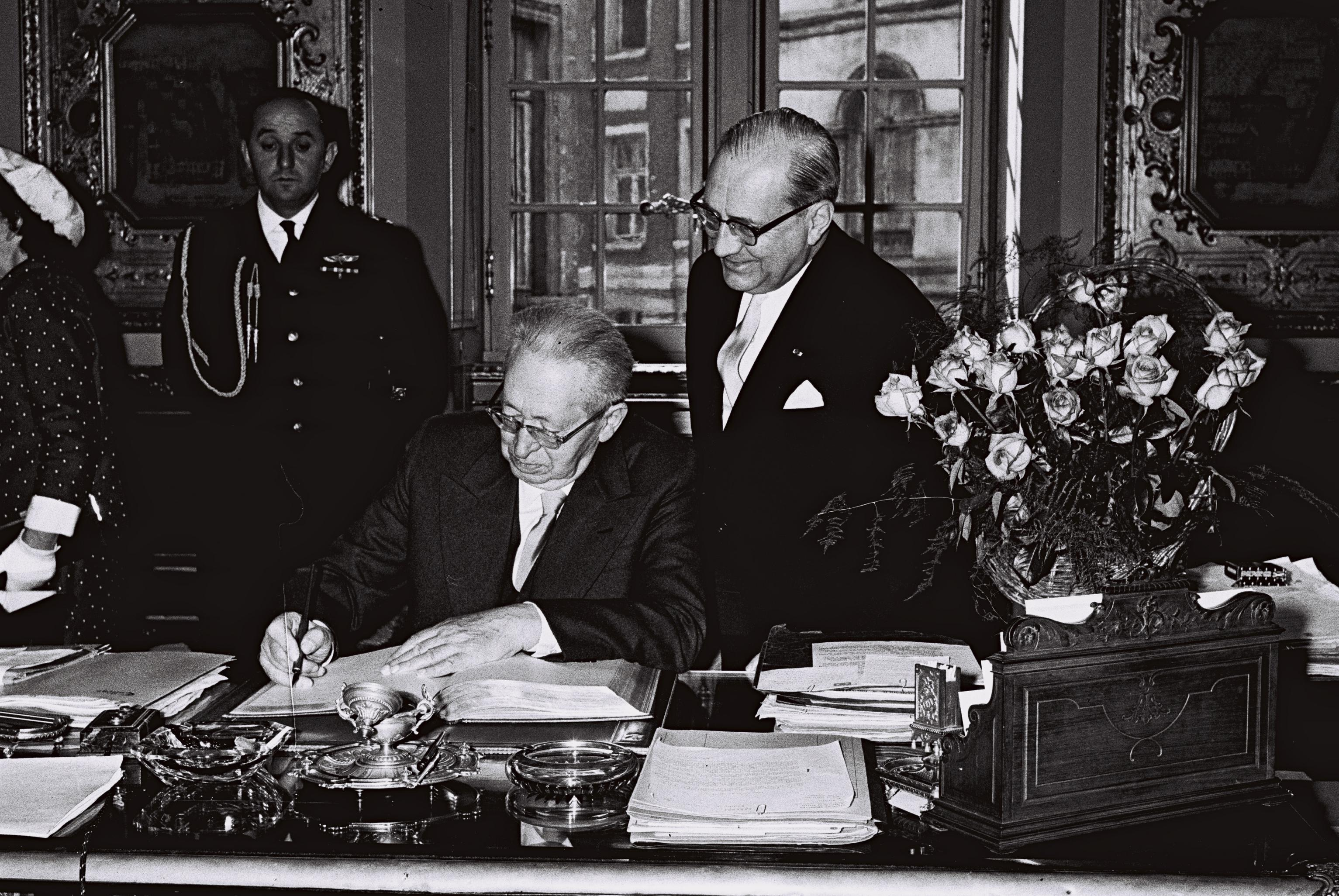
Lucien Cooremans standing by the President of Israel, Yitzhak Ben-Zvi as he signs the visitors book at Brussels Town Hall

== See also ==
- List of mayors of the City of Brussels

== Sources ==
- Van Molle, P., Het Belgisch parlement 1894–1969, Gent, Erasmus, 1969, p. 48.
- Le Livre Bleu. Recueil biographique, Brussel, Maison Ferd. Larcier, 1950, p. 93.
- Brussels (Municipality, Region of Brussels-Capital, Belgium)
- Lettre de Lucien Cooremans au baron Snoy et d'Oppuers (9 novembre 1957)

Political offices
| Preceded by Joseph Van De Meulebroeck | Mayor of Brussels; 1956–1975 | Succeeded by Pierre Van Halteren |
