= Adolphe Max =

Belgian liberal politician and mayor of Brussels (1869-1939)

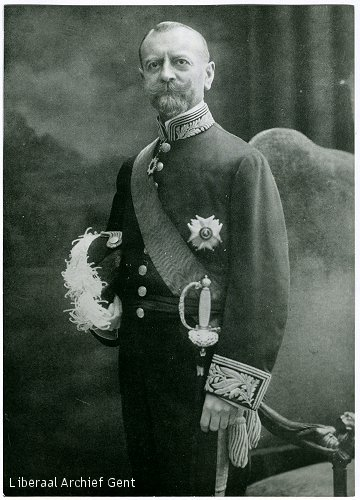

Mayor of Brussels
- In office 6 December 1909 – 6 November 1939 (Note: Temporarily replaced by Charles Lemonnier from September 1914 to 13 November 1918 during the German occupation of Belgium.)
- Preceded by: Emile De Mot
- Succeeded by: Joseph Van De Meulebroeck

Personal details
- Born: Adolphe Eugène Jean Henri Max; 30 December 1869 Brussels, Belgium
- Died: 6 November 1939 (aged 69)
- Party: Liberal Party
- Occupation: Politician, lawyer

Adolphe Eugène Jean Henri Max (30 December 1869 – 6 November 1939) was a Belgian liberal politician and mayor of the City of Brussels from 1909 until his death. He was also an irregular freemason, an honorary Minister of State and a member of the Institut de France.

== Life ==
Max graduated in law at the Free University of Brussels, and entered the legal profession, besides doing journalistic work. When he was 25 years old, he was elected a province councillor for Brabant, and was elected a city councillor in 1903. After he had worked as a magistrate, he was appointed mayor of Brussels on 6 December 1909.

Under the German occupation of Brussels during the First World War, Max refused to cooperate with the occupying forces. As a result, he was arrested and held in captivity, first at Namur, and then at Glatz (Poland) and Goslar (Germany), until he escaped on 13 November 1918. Charles Lemonnier was acting mayor during his captivity. On his return to Brussels, he was greeted as a hero. In 1919, he was elected to the Belgian Chamber of Representatives, where he campaigned for universal adult suffrage, a goal not achieved until after his death.

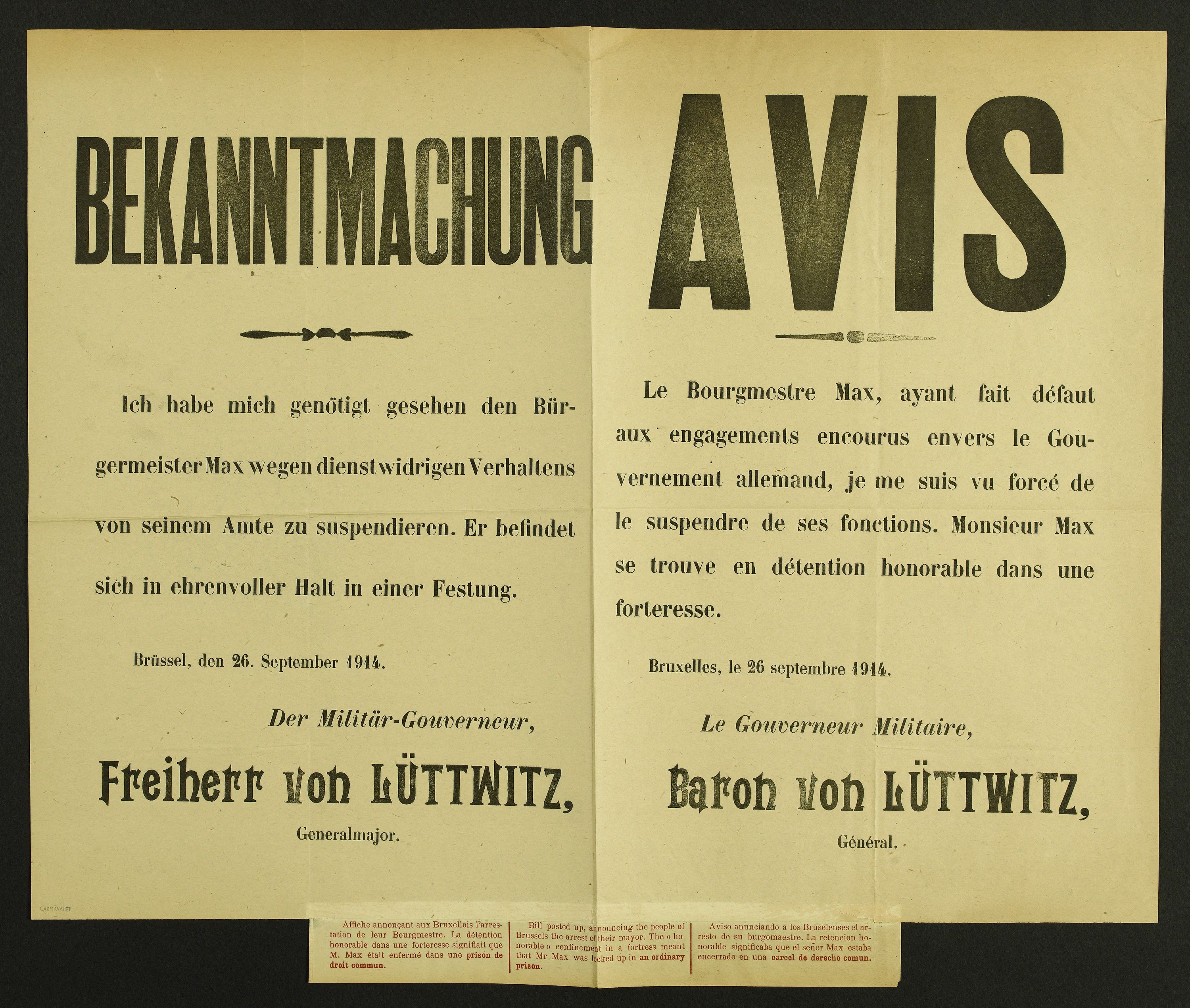
Proclamation poster from the German occupation administration in Brussels in September 1914 announcing Max's deposition from his role as mayor and his imprisonment

== Legacy ==
Among the monuments from Max's time in office as mayor of Brussels are parts of the Royal Museums of Fine Arts of Belgium and the Heysel/Heizel exhibition park built for the Brussels International Exposition of 1935. The Boulevard Adolphe Max/Adolphe Maxlaan, a central boulevard of the City of Brussels, is named after him, as are primary and secondary schools near Square Ambiorix. There is also a Place Adolphe Max in the 9th arrondissement of Paris which was named in his honour in January 1940, shortly after his death.

A street in the 5th arrondissement of Lyon France is named in his honour as Avenue Adolphe Max.

== Honours ==
- 1910: Knight Grand cross in the Order of the Crown of Prussia.
- 1918: Grand Officer in the Order of Leopold.
- 1932: Grand Cordon in the Order of Leopold.
- 1938: Grand Cross of the Order of the White Lion
- Member of the Royal Academies for Science and the Arts of Belgium.

== Sources ==
- Grojean, O., Adolphe Max, in : Le Flambeau, I, 1918, nr. 6, p. 178.
- Seyl, A., Un grand citoyen : Adolphe Max, in : Revue de Bruxelles, April 1958, p. III.
- Vierset, A., Adolphe Max, in : Cahiers Historiques, Série IV, 1964, nr. 33, p. 83.
- Cooremans, Lucien, Adolphe Max, bourgmestre des heures tragiques et des heures glorieuses, in : De 1830 à 1958. Douze bourgmestres libéraux ont fait de Bruxelles une des plus prestigieuses capitales, s.l., s.n., s.d., s.p.
