= Felix Vanderstraeten =

Belgian liberal politician and mayor of Brussels (1823–1884)

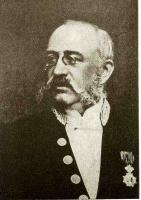

Mayor of Brussels
- In office 20 May 1879 – 21 January 1881
- Preceded by: Jules Anspach
- Succeeded by: Charles Buls

Personal details
- Born: 18 July 1823 Brussels, United Kingdom of the Netherlands
- Died: 29 June 1884 (aged 60) Brussels, Belgium
- Party: Liberal Party
- Occupation: Politician

Felix Vanderstraeten (18 July 1823 – 29 June 1884) was a Belgian liberal politician and mayor of the City of Brussels.

He was a brewer, and became alderman and mayor of Brussels (1879–1881).

== See also ==
- List of mayors of the City of Brussels

== Sources ==
- Cooremans, Lucien, Félix Vanderstraeten proposa déjà, en 1880, de faire participer les communes de l'agglomération aux charges financières de la capitale, in : De 1830 à 1958. Douze bourgmestres libéraux ont fait de Bruxelles une des plus prestigieuses capitales, s.l., s.n., s.d., s.p.
