= Pierre Van Halteren =

Belgian politician (1911–2009)

Mayor of Brussels
- In office 30 August 1975 – 4 March 1983
- Preceded by: Lucien Cooremans
- Succeeded by: Hervé Brouhon

Personal details
- Born: 24 February 1911 Brussels, Belgium
- Died: 23 September 2009 (aged 98)
- Party: Liberal Reformist Party
- Other political affiliations: Liberal Party
- Occupation: Politician

Pierre Van Halteren (24 February 1911 – 23 September 2009) was a Belgian liberal politician who served as mayor of the City of Brussels from 1975 to 1982. In 1979, he was the president of the Brussels francophone liberal party, the Liberal Party until it was dissolved when the Liberals joined the PRLW to form the Liberal Reformist Party.

== See also ==
- List of mayors of the City of Brussels

== Sources ==
- Leaders of Belgium
- Blauw in de grote Vlaamse steden ? (Dutch, liberal archive)

Political offices
Preceded by Lucien Cooremans	Mayor of Brussels; 1975-1982	Succeeded by Hervé Brouhon
