= Charles Buls =

Belgian liberal politician and mayor of Brussels (1837–1914)

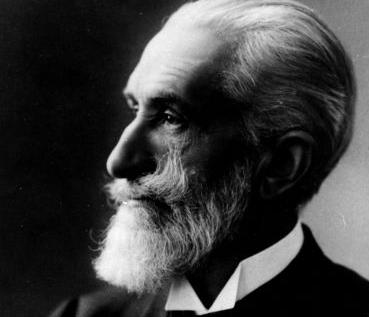

Mayor of Brussels
- In office 17 December 1881 – 16 December 1899
- Preceded by: Felix Vanderstraeten
- Succeeded by: Emile De Mot

Personal details
- Born: Charles François Gommaire Buls; 13 October 1837 Brussels, Belgium
- Died: 13 July 1914 (aged 76) Ixelles, Belgium
- Party: Liberal Party
- Occupation: Politician

Charles François Gommaire Buls (Dutch: Karel Frans Gommaar Buls; 13 October 1837 – 13 July 1914) was a Belgian politician and mayor of the City of Brussels.

== Early life ==
Charles François Gommaire Buls was born in Brussels as the son of a goldsmith from the region of Mechelen. Buls received an artistic education, and spent a year in Paris, and nine months in Italy, studying fine arts. He also learned several languages including English, German, Italian and Latin, besides his mother tongue Dutch. He followed in his father's footsteps and worked as a goldsmith.

In 1862, he became a Freemason in Les vrais amis, and in 1871 joined La libre pensée. At the same time, he was a member of de Veldbloem and Vlamingen vooruit, two Flemish organisations of the Flemish movement. Together with his brother in law, Leo Van der Kindere, the later mayor of Uccle, he became a flamingant.

== Politics ==
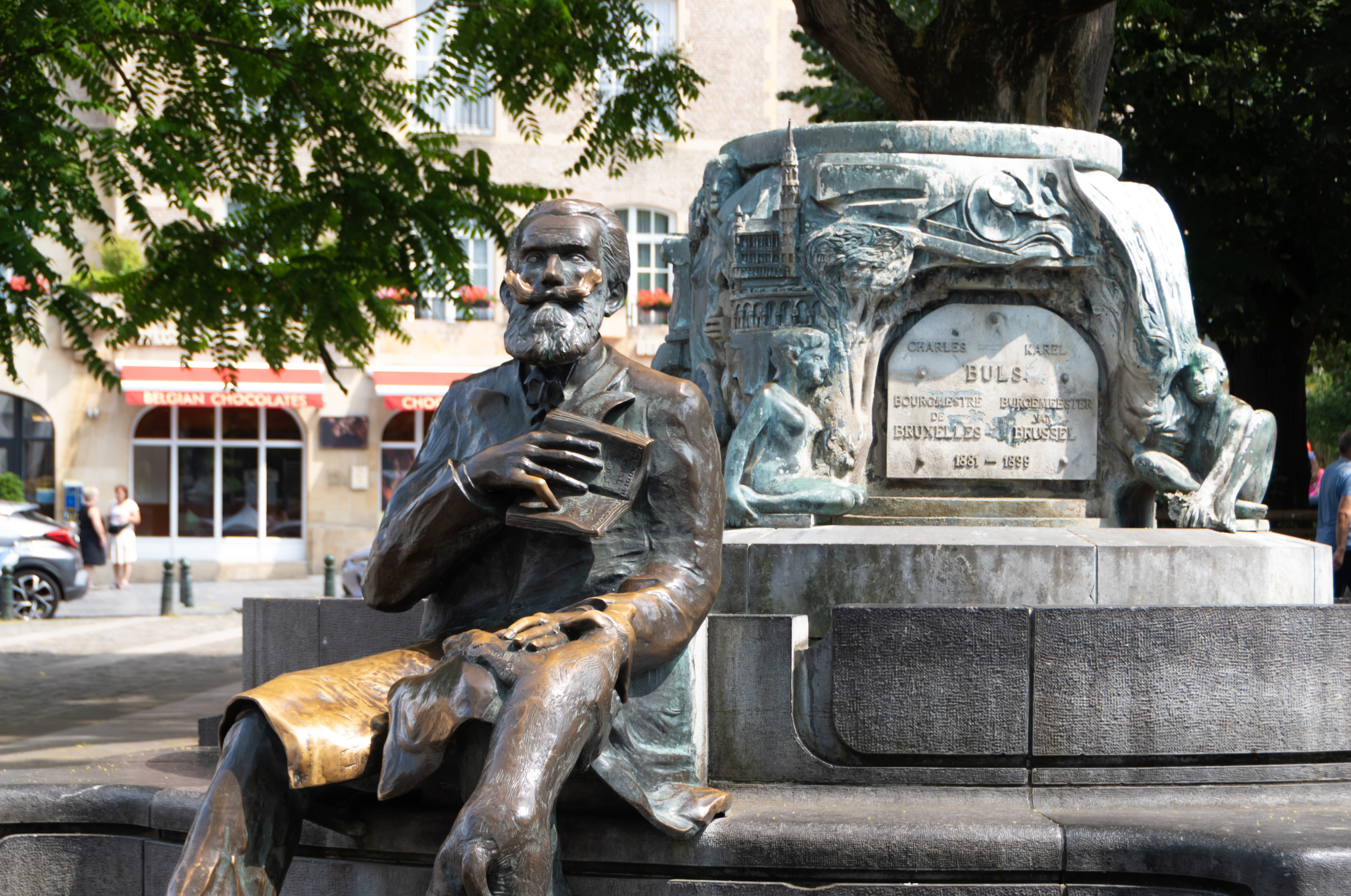
Charles Buls Fountain, Place de l'Agora/Agoraplein, Brussels

Buls entered politics in 1870 as a Flemish candidate on a radical list but he was not elected until 1877, when he was elected to the Brussels City Council on a liberal list. He became schepen or échevin of education in 1879. Buls was a supporter of progressive causes, especially in language issues and education, and the education of women, on which he wrote frequently. He was a supporter of Isabelle Gatti de Gamond's educational reforms. From 1879 on he played an important role in the development of Flemish education in Brussels.

On the national stage, Buls served in the Belgian Chamber of Representatives in 1882, and again from 1886 to 1894.

Buls became mayor of Brussels in 1881 and remained in office until 1899. At his initiative, policemen had to be able to speak both French and Dutch and bilingual signposting was established throughout the city. However, along with these reforms, his most lasting achievement was the result of his opposition to the grandiose architectural schemes of King Leopold II, and the resulting preservation of old parts of Brussels. In particular, Buls was a steadfast defender and admirer of the Mont des Arts/Kunstberg and the Grand-Place/Grote Markt, now a UNESCO World Heritage Site, successfully proposing the 1883 city ordinance protecting the façades of the Grand-Place buildings and providing funds for their restoration, which took place between 1883 and 1923. In 1899, the architects of Brussels who had been involved in this restoration work paid for a memorial commemorating Buls, designed by Victor Horta and executed by Victor Rousseau, to be placed in the rebuilt L'Étoile/De Sterre guildhall on the Grand-Place. At the reopening of the restored Town Hall, Buls greeted Leopold II in Dutch, and the King replied in the same language, which was unusual at the time. In 1999, a new fountain with a larger-than-life-sized seated statue of Buls and his dog was erected at the Place Agoraplein, close to the Grand-Place.

Buls was an accomplished and prolific author, not merely on educational and artistic issues but also publishing accounts of his travels abroad.

== See also ==
- List of mayors of the City of Brussels
