= Freddy Thielemans =

Belgian politician (1944–2022)

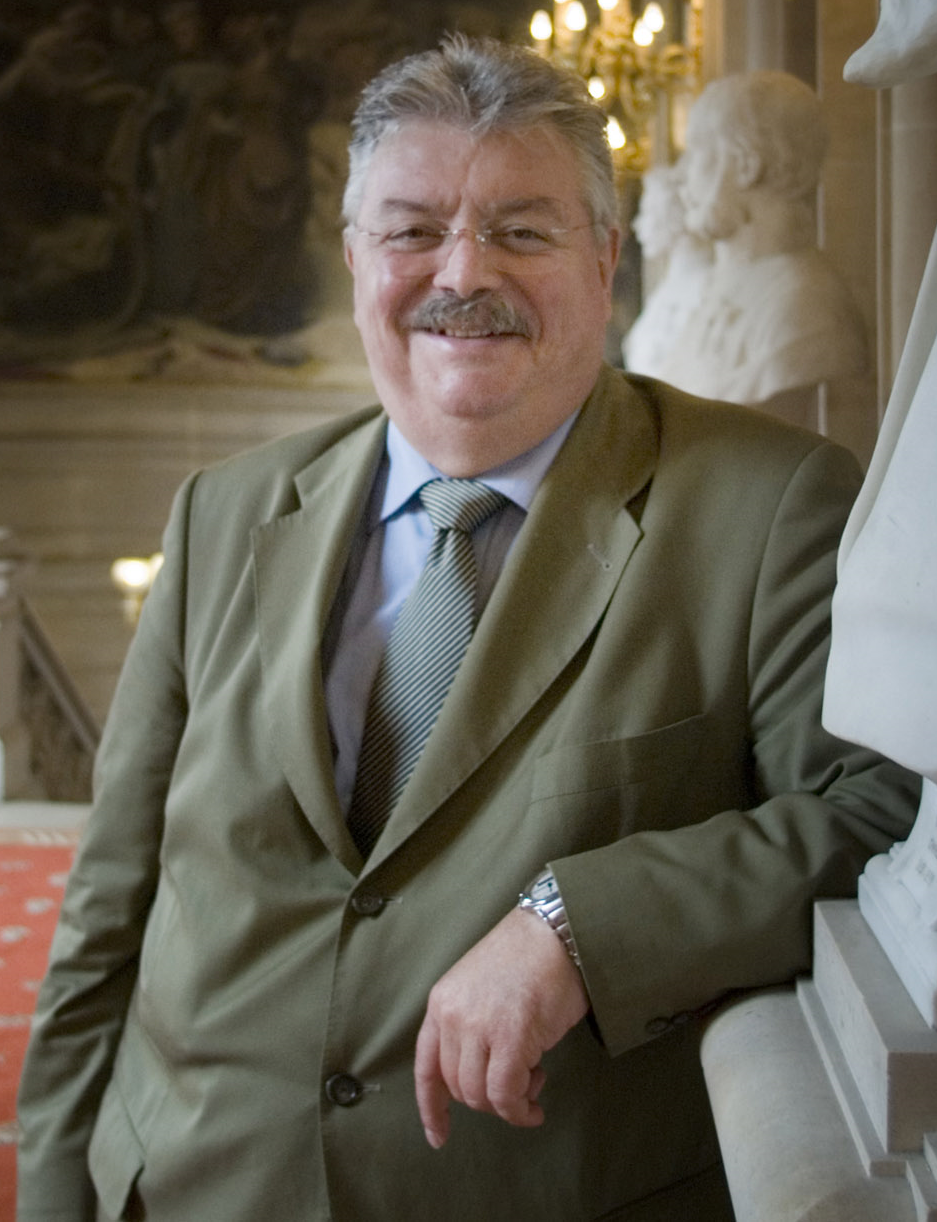
- Thielemans in 2006

Mayor of Brussels
- In office 16 January 2001 – 13 December 2013
- Preceded by: François-Xavier de Donnea
- Succeeded by: Yvan Mayeur
- In office 28 April 1994 – 9 January 1995
- Preceded by: Michel Demaret
- Succeeded by: François-Xavier de Donnea

Personal details
- Born: 11 September 1944 Laeken, Brussels, Belgium
- Died: 29 January 2022 (aged 77)
- Party: Socialist Party
- Spouse: Cécile Charles
- Occupation: Politician, teacher

Freddy Thielemans (11 September 1944 – 29 January 2022) was a Belgian socialist politician who was the mayor of the City of Brussels from 2001 to 2013, and previously also for a period in 1994.

Freddy Thielemans learnt to play rugby with Brussels Barbarians RFC during the late 1970s and early 1980s as a prop, took part in the Vancouver Tour in 1982 and also represented Belgium at Rugby Union.

== Life and career ==
Thielemans graduated in Commercial Sciences before working as a teacher in some high schools in Brussels. His political career started in 1983 when he worked on the cabinet of Hervé Brouhon, then the mayor of Brussels. He became an alderman for the Socialist Party in 1988, and mayor of Brussels between 1994 and 1995. He served in the Brussels Parliament from 1995 until 1999, when he became a member of the European Parliament. After the municipal elections of 2000, he again became the mayor of Brussels from early 2001 on. He resigned in 2013 due to his age, and was succeeded by Yvan Mayeur. Thielemans also had a seat on the board of the Atomium.

He was married to Cécile Charles and had two children, Myra and Camille. In 2016, he suffered a serious fall that led to a brain haemorrhage and a time in a coma. From then on, his health was poorer.

Thielemans died on 29 January 2022, at the age of 77.

== Honours ==
- 2014: Officer in the Legion of Honour
- 2014: Knight in the Order of Leopold

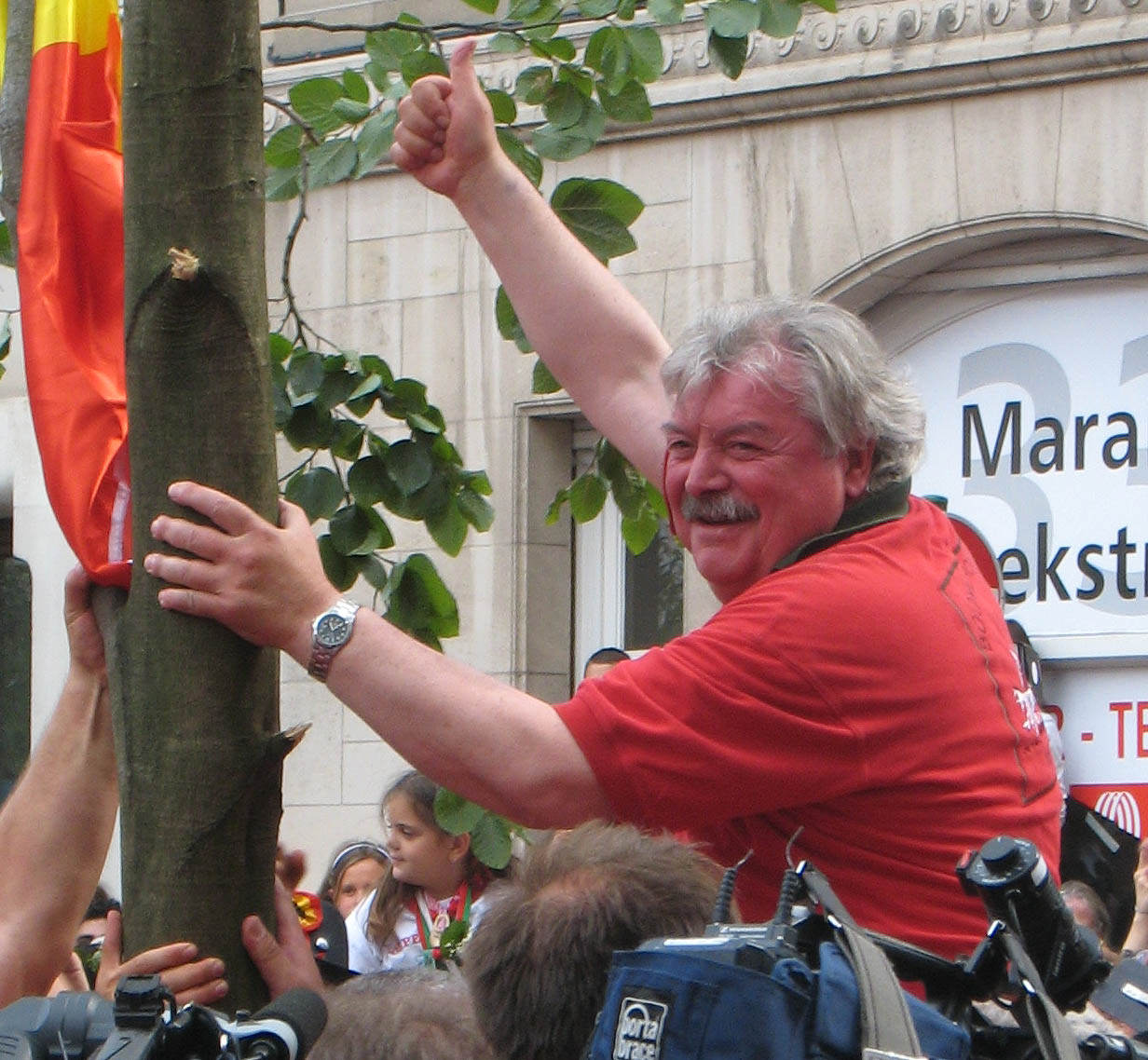
Thielemans in 2009

Political offices
Preceded by Michel Demaret	Mayor of Brussels; 1994	Succeeded by François-Xavier de Donnea
Political offices
Preceded by François-Xavier de Donnea	Mayor of Brussels; 2001–2013	Succeeded by Yvan Mayeur
