= Michel Demaret =

Belgian politician

Mayor of Brussels
- In office 20 July 1993 – 24 March 1994
- Preceded by: Hervé Brouhon
- Succeeded by: Freddy Thielemans

Personal details
- Born: 18 January 1940 Uccle, Belgium
- Died: 9 November 2000 (aged 60) Namur, Belgium
- Party: Humanist Democratic Centre
- Occupation: Politician

Michel Demaret (18 January 1940 – 9 November 2000) was a Belgian politician who briefly served as mayor of the City of Brussels from July 1993 to March 1994.

== Popular TV hero ==
Originally a club bouncer of humble origin from the Marolles neighbourhood, his general attitude and manner of speech made him a target for jokes, but also for popularity among many electors and TV viewers, particularly after the broadcasting of two documentaries about him, at that time still a low level employee at the Retirement Office, by Fait Divers, a famous Belgian television magazine, realized in 1971 and 1972 by Jean-Jacques Péché and Pierre Manuel, Les Fonctionnaires (the Public Servants) and Week-end ou la qualité de la vie (Week end or quality of life). The magazines have been put on the air a lot of times in the next quarter of a century by the Belgian TV, always with a high success. Another documentary, Tel qu'en lui-même enfin (Finally as himself) was made in 1997 by the Strip Tease magazine, filmed at the peak of Demaret's political career.

== Popular politician ==
After the first documentaries, he was recruited by the former Prime Minister Paul Vanden Boeynants for his Belgian Christian Social Party. He became alderman for the Registry Offices (1976–1982), for Registry Offices, Urbanism and Personnel (1982–1988) and for Public Works and Communal Properties (1988–1994), he was also briefly interim Mayor of Brussels from 20 July 1993 to 24 March 1994, after the death of Hervé Brouhon. He was the only Christian Social mayor in the city's political history, as his mentor Vanden Boeynants was under judicial enquiry each time he tried to rise to this function. He was president of the Foyer Laekenois/Lakense Haard social housing association from 1978, a function that made it possible for him to enlarge his clientelist practices. He was also a member of the Parliament of the Brussels-Capital Region (from 12 July 1989 till 1999).

== Controversy ==
A corpulent man, Michel Demaret was popularly known as Dikke Mich (Fat Mike in Dutch), or Monsieur 10% (Mister 10% in French), for his reputation of taking 10% for each contract as alderman for Public Works.

This dubious reputation, also the trading mark of his political godfather Paul Vanden Boeynants, was confirmed fourteen years after his death by a court, but the contractors, his widow Francine Vereecken, his daughter and his son-in-law benefited from the prescription for corruption and whitewashing hitherto attested facts for amounts over €2.5 million. At the trial, his stepson said that "In the early 1990s he entrusted me with envelopes. I had to hide them in my small supermarket. Once I counted the content, there were more than 100 million Belgian francs (€2.5 million). Michel Demaret came back to fetch them.". A few hours before his sudden death, in September 2000, he was controlled in a train from Zürich, the customs officers saw huge banknotes wads sticking out from his pockets, he was slightly drunk and an amount of more than 110,000 euro was found in his suitcase. 30,000 euro were seized and he was notified that he would have to prove that this money had a licit origin to get it back.

== Quotes ==
- The Pope, "who can't use a rubber and put it on his index" (in French, index is the index finger as well as the abbreviation for Index Librorum Prohibitorum) The saying "le Pape qui ne sait pas employer une capote et la met à l'index" was attributed to him after the demolition of the oldest house in Brussels, denounced by architects and historians: "well, now another one is the oldest".

== Sources ==
Political offices
Preceded by Hervé Brouhon	Mayor of Brussels; 1993-1994	Succeeded by Freddy Thielemans
