= Emile De Mot =

Belgian liberal politician and mayor of Brussels (1835–1909)

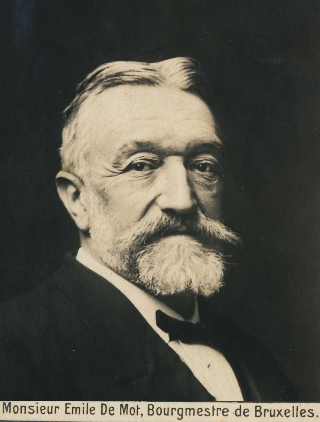

Mayor of Brussels
- In office 16 December 1899 – 6 December 1909
- Preceded by: Charles Buls
- Succeeded by: Adolphe Max

Personal details
- Born: Emile André Jean De Mot; 20 October 1835; Antwerp, Belgium
- Died: 23 November 1909 (aged 74); Brussels, Belgium
- Political party: Liberal Party
- Occupation: Politician

Emile André Jean De Mot (20 October 1835 – 23 November 1909) was a Belgian liberal politician and mayor of the City of Brussels.

He was a lawyer and became alderman and mayor of Brussels (1899–1909). He was also a member of parliament.

== See also ==
- List of mayors of the City of Brussels

== Sources ==
- Emile Jean André DE MOT – Familiekunde Brussel
