= List of mayors of the City of Brussels =

Mayor of the City of Brussels
- French: Bourgmestre de Bruxelles; Dutch: Burgemeester van Brussel

- Incumbent; Philippe Close since 20 July 2017
- Residence: Brussels Town Hall
- Term length: Six years
- Website: Website in English

This is a list of mayors or burgomasters of the City of Brussels.

== Burgundian Netherlands (1384–1482) ==
- 1380: Geert Pipenpoy
- 1381: Geert Pipenpoy and Jacques Stovaert
- 1421: J. Swaeff, J. Cooman
- 1422: Walter Vanden Heetvelde, Petrus van Bolenbeke
- 1423: Guillaume de Kesterbeke, Jan van Muysen
- 1424: Jan van Coundeberg, called Rolibuc, Gielis Daneels,
- 1425: Willem van Herzele, J. de Schore, called de Briedere
- 1426: Wenceslas t'Serclaes, J. Rampaert
- 1427: Jean de Hertoghe, Michel de Mabeert
- 1428: H. Magnus, J. de Broeckhoven
- 1429: Willem van Kesterbeke, Daniel Poelbroot
- 1430: Simon van Ophem, J. de Schore, called de Briedere
- 1431: Walter, son of Gerard Pipenpoy, J. Roypens
- 1432: Wenceslas t'Serclaes, Félix de Hont
- 1433: J. Bernaige, H. de Beringen
- 1434: Jean de Frigidomonte
- 1435: Walter Vandernoot, J. Rampaert
- 1436: Walter Vanden Winckele, Arnout Wellems, said Van Almkercke
- 1437: Henri Taye, J. van Broeckhoven
- 1438: Everard t'Serarnts, Jean Ofhuys
- 1439: Jan de Mol, son of Jan, J. Bogaert
- 1440: Nicolaas Vanden Heetvelde, J. Rampaert
- 1441: Walter, son of Walter Vandernoot, Arnout Wellems, called Van Almkercke
- 1442: Jan de Frigidomonte, God. Taye
- 1443: J. t'Serclaes, J. de Schore
- 1444: Jan, son of Jan de Mol, Gerard Pipenpoy, died on 4 septembre; replaced by J. Vanden Driessche
- 1445: Nicolaas Vanden Heetvelde, H. Vander Straeten, called Meeus
- 1446: Wenceslas T'Serclaes, Martin Wegsken, called Snellaert
- 1447: Antoine Mennen, Arnoul Wellems, called Van Almkercke
- 1448: Walter Vandernoot, Nicolas Vanden Driele
- 1449: Jean Vandernoot, Guill. Utenberge
- 1450: Nicolas Vanden Heetvelde, H. Vander Straeten
- 1451: Amelric Was, J. Cambier
- 1452: Everard T'Serarnts, Joos Westveling
- 1453: J. de Mol, J. de Blare
- 1454: Jan, son of Walter Vandernoot, J. Eggerix
- 1455: Thierry de Mol, Josse de Pape
- 1456: Amelric Was, Guill. Rampaert
- 1457: Walter Vanden Winckele, J. Cambier
- 1458: Philippe Van Nieuwenhove, Albertin Frenier
- 1459: Siger Vanden Heetvelde, J. Eggerix
- 1460: J. de Mol, J. Giellaert
- 1461: Amelric Was,
- 1462: Walter Vanden Winckele, Gerelin de Moor, called in den Sleutel
- 1463: Walter Vandernoot, Joos Westveling
- 1464: Petrus Pipenpoy, Willem de Smeth
- 1465: Jan Schat, J. de Poelke
- 1466: Everard t'Serclaes, Jan Offhuys
- 1467: H. Heenkenshoot, Adam Vandersleehagen
- 1468: Amelric Was, H. de Mol, dit Cooman
- 1469: Walter Vandernoot (lord of Risoir), J. Vander Moelen
- 1470: Antoon Thonys, J. Cambier
- 1471: Conrad Vander Neeren, J. de Poelke
- 1472: J. de Mol, Jacob Vanden Poele, called Poelman
- 1473: H. Heenkenshoot, Adam de Bogaerden, called Jordaens
- 1474: Nicolas Vanden Heetvelde, J. Ofhuys
- 1475: Costin de Limelette, Gerelin de Moor, called in den Sleutel
- 1476: J. Schat, J. Eeckaert
- 1477: J. Vander Meeren, Arnoul Vanden Plassche
- 1478: H. Vander Meeren
- 1479: H. t'Serarnts, God. Wyngaert
- 1480: Roland de Mol, Thierry Ruttens
- 1481: Wenceslas t'Serclaes, Petrus de Jonge

== Habsburg Netherlands (1482–1581) ==
- 1482–1483: J. Bernsige, J. Mosselman
- 1483–1484: J. van Buyssegem, J. de Poelke
- 1484–1485: H. Vander Meeren
- 1485–1496: Roland de Mol, René Van Thienen
- 1486–1487: Pierre Was, Engelbert Vander Moelen
- 1487–1488: H. de Mol, Jacques de Ruwe
- 1488: Adriaan van Assche
- 1488: Willem T'Serclaes
- 1488–1489: J. de Heemvliet, J. de Walsche
- 1489–1490: Willem T'Serclaes, J. de Poelke
- 1490–1491: Hector Vandernoot, René Van Thienen
- 1491–1492: Jan van Catthem, Joos Zegers
- 1492–1493: Adriaan van Droogenbroeck, Petrus Goessens
- 1493–1494: Helegast Vander Meeren, J. Van Zennen
- 1494–1495: Jan Vander Meeren
- 1495–1496: Guill. Van Bitterswyck, J. Moyensoene
- 1496–1497: J. Vanden Heetvelde, Simon Van Doerne
- 1497–1498: Amelric Was, Jacques de Ruwe
- 1498–1499: Gielis Van Aelst, Pierre Goessens
- 1499: Wenceslas T'Serclaes, J. de Walssche
- 1525: Jan Van Nieuwenhove
- 1546: Jan de Locquenghien
- 1556: Jean Pipenpoy
- 1574–1576: Jacob Taye, lord of Gooik
- 1576–1577: Antoon Quarré, Petrus Cuyerman
- 1577–1578: Karel van Brecht, Frans Jacobs
- 1578–1579: Leonard Vandenhecke, Willem de Smet
- 1579–1580: Jacob Taye, Simon de Sailly
- 1580–1581: Leonard Vandenhecke, Adriaan Van Conincxloo

== Spanish and Austrian Netherlands (1581–1794) ==
- 1581–1585: Hendrik de Bloyere
- 1585–1586: Jacques Taye, J. Van Geersmeutere
- 1586–1588: Lancelot II Schets, 2nd Count of Grobbendonck, baron de Wesemale, J. Van Gersmeutere
- 1588–1590: Philippe de Rodoan, lord of Bergeghem
- 1590–1592: Hendrik van Dongelberghe, Gabriel Van Bemmel
- 1592–1594: Gielis de Busleyden, Willem de Vaddere
- 1594–1596: Henri de Dongelberghe, Arnold Addiers
- 1596–1598: François de Senft
- 1598–1599: Hendrik van Dongelberghe, Willem de Vaddere
- 1600–1601: Karel van Lathem, Gérard Mouton
- 1602: J. Duquesnoy, Lord van Steen
- 1603–1604: Hendrik van Dongelberghe, Arnold Addiers
- 1605: Karel van Lathem, Gérard Mouton
- 1606: Hendrik van Dongelberghe, Arnold Addiers
- 1607: Jacques Vandernoot, seigneur de Kiesekem, Gérard Mouton
- 1608–1609: Égide de Busleyden, Guillaume de Smet
- 1609: Charles de Lathem, Simon de Sailly
- 1610–1611: Hendrik van Dongelberghe, Arnold Addiers
- 1620: Englebert de Taye, baron of Wemmel.
- 1646: François de Dongelberghe
- 1688-1689: Henry Pipenpoy
- 1692: Henry Pipenpoy
- 1699: Charles-Léopold Fierlant
- 1700–1702: Roger-Wauthier van der Noot, 1st Baron of Carloo
- 1702–1707: Charles van den Berghen, comte de Limminghe
- 1707–1724: Jean Baptiste Aurelius Walhorn

== French Republic (1794–1804) ==
- 1795–1800: Jean-Baptiste Verlooy
- 1800: Paul Arconati-Visconti, Marquess of Busto
- 1800–1803: Nicolas Rouppe
- 1803–1804: Henri Joseph Van Langenhoven

== First French Empire (1804–1815) ==
- 1804-1805: Louis Devos
- 1805–1809: Charles de Mérode
- 1810–1814: Charles-Joseph, 4th Duke d'Ursel
- 1814-1815: Baron Joseph van der Linden d'Hooghvorst

== Kingdom of the Netherlands (1815–1830) ==
- 1815–1817: Baron Louis de Wellens
- 1817-1820: Vicomte Hyacinthe van der Fosse
- 1820-1830: Baron Louis de Wellens

== Kingdom of Belgium (1830–present) ==
No.	Portrait	Name (Birth–Death)	Term (Election)	Term of office		Political Party
1		Nicolas-Jean Rouppe (1769–1838)	• (Appointed by Monarch)	22 October 1830	3 August 1838 (Died in office)	Independent
2		Guillaume-Hippolyte van Volxem (1791–1868)	• (Appointed by Monarch)	13 September 1838	13 April 1841	Independent
3		François-Jean Wyns de Raucour (1779–1857)	• (Appointed by Monarch)	14 April 1841	4 October 1848	Independent
4		Charles de Brouckère (1796–1860)	• (Appointed by Monarch)	5 October 1848	20 April 1860 (Died in office)	Liberal Party
5		André-Napoléon Fontainas (1807–1863)	• (Appointed by Monarch)	21 April 1860	19 July 1863 (Died in office)	Liberal Party
6		Jules Anspach (1829–1879)	• (Appointed by Monarch)	15 October 1863	19 May 1879 (Died in office)	Liberal Party
7		Felix Vanderstraeten (1823–1884)	• (Appointed by Monarch)	20 May 1879	21 January 1881	Liberal Party
8		Charles Buls (1837–1914)	• (Appointed by Monarch)	17 December 1881	16 December 1899	Liberal Party
9		Emile De Mot (1835–1909)	• (Appointed by Monarch)	16 December 1899	6 December 1909	Liberal Party
10		Adolphe Max (1869–1939)	• (Appointed by Monarch)	6 December 1909	6 November 1939 (Died in office)	Liberal Party
11		Joseph Van De Meulebroeck (1876–1958)	• (Appointed by Monarch)	28 November 1939	13 February 1956	Liberal Party
12		Lucien Cooremans (1889–1985)	• (Appointed by Monarch)	14 February 1956	29 August 1975	Party for Freedom and Progress
13		Pierre Van Halteren (1911–2009)	• (1976)	30 August 1975	4 March 1983	Party for Freedom and Progress
14		Hervé Brouhon (1924–1993)	• (1982)	4 March 1983	10 April 1993 (Died in office)	Socialist Party
15		Michel Demaret (1940–2000)	• (Appointed by City Council)	20 July 1993	24 March 1994	Humanist Democratic Centre
16		Freddy Thielemans (1944–2022)	1st (1994)	28 April 1994	9 January 1995	Socialist Party
17		François-Xavier de Donnea (born in 1941)	• (Appointed by City Council)	21 May 1995	18 October 2000	Reformist Movement
18		Freddy Thielemans (1944–2022)	2nd (2000)	16 January 2001	13 December 2013	Socialist Party
18		Freddy Thielemans (1944–2022)	3rd (2006)	16 January 2001	13 December 2013	Socialist Party
19		Yvan Mayeur (born in 1960)	• (2012)	13 December 2013	8 June 2017	Socialist Party
20		Philippe Close (born in 1971)	• (2018)	9 June 2017	Incumbent	Socialist Party

== See also ==
- Timeline of Brussels

== Notes ==
1. Kwartieren.short notice
2. Letters of Anthonie Heinsius, 1702-1720.short notice
3. Vannoppen, Henri, Everberg, Le village des Princes. article
4. Site Ursel Family. article
