= Hervé Brouhon =

Belgian politician (1924–1993)

Mayor of Brussels
- In office 4 March 1983 – 10 April 1993
- Preceded by: Pierre Van Halteren
- Succeeded by: Michel Demaret

Personal details
- Born: 18 June 1924; Etterbeek, Belgium
- Died: 10 April 1993 (aged 68); Anderlecht, Belgium
- Political party: Socialist Party
- Occupation: Politician, teacher

Hervé Brouhon (18 June 1924 – 10 April 1993) was a Belgian politician for the Belgian Socialist Party.

Brouhon was born in Etterbeek. He became a teacher, he was first elected as a municipal councillor in Brussels in 1950 and became its first socialist mayor from 1983 to 1993. He had also been member of the Belgian Chamber of Representatives from 1958 to 1985, and briefly Minister for Social Welfare in 1965–1966. Brouhon died in Anderlecht in 1993.

Political offices
Preceded by Pierre Van Halteren	Mayor of Brussels; 1983-1993	Succeeded by Michel Demaret
